= List of Germans =

This is a list of notable Germans. Persons of mixed heritage have their respective ancestries credited.

== Architects ==
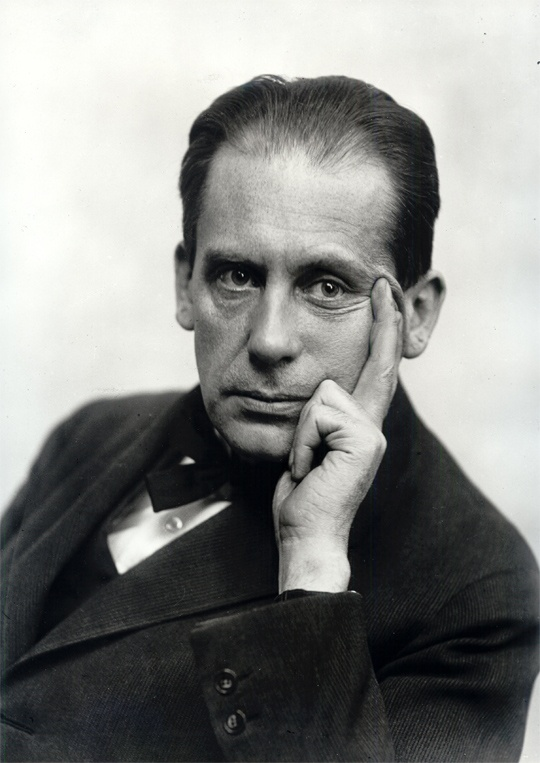
Walter Gropius

- Walter Gropius (1883–1969), architect
- Carl Ludvig Engel (1778–1840), architect
- Leo von Klenze (1784–1864), architect
- Balthasar Neumann (1687–1753), architect and engineer
- Matthäus Daniel Pöppelmann (1662–1736), architect
- Ludwig Mies van der Rohe (1886–1969), architect
- Karl Friedrich Schinkel (1781–1841), architect and painter
- Johann Conrad Schlaun (1695–1773), architect
- Gottfried Semper (1803–1879), architect
- Albert Speer (1905–1981), architect
- Wilhelm Kreis (1873–1955), architect

== Artists ==
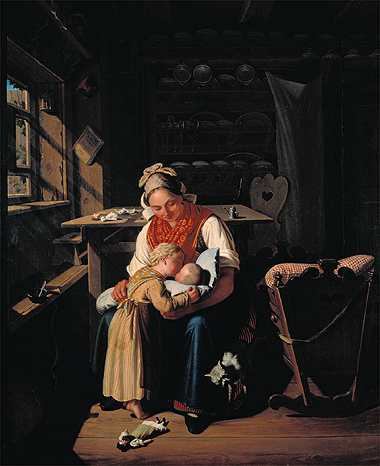
Häusliche Szene by Johann Gottlieb Hantzsch, 1831

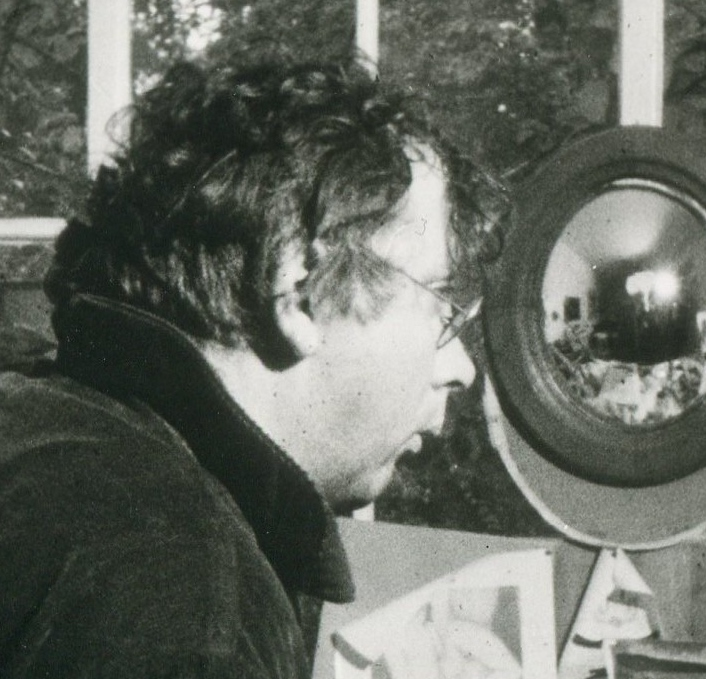
Horst Janssen, 1968

=== A–M ===
- Hans von Aachen (1552–1615), mannerist painter
- Albrecht Altdorfer (1480–1538), painter
- Gertrud Arndt (1903–2000), photographer; pioneering self-portraiture
- Thomas Anders (born 1963), singer, songwriter and producer
- Ernst Barlach (1870–1938), sculptor and writer
- Günther Behnisch (1922–2010), architect
- Peter Behrens (1868–1940), architect
- Sibylle Bergemann (1941–2010), photographer
- Joseph Beuys (1921–1986), artist
- Hermann Biow (1804–1850), photographer
- Elisabeth Böhm (1921–2012), architect
- Gottfried Böhm (1920–2021), architect
- Erwin Bowien (1899-1972), painter
- Arno Breker (1900–1991), sculptor
- Lovis Corinth (1858–1925), painter
- Lucas Cranach the Elder (1472–1553), painter
- Lucas Cranach the Younger (1515–1586), painter
- Yitzhak Danziger (1916–1977), Berlin-born Israeli sculptor
- Otto Dix (1891–1969), painter
- Albrecht Dürer (1471–1528), painter
- Egon Eiermann (1904–1970), architect and designer
- Max Ernst (1891–1976), surrealist painter
- Carl Eytel (1862–1925), painter of desert landscapes in the American Southwest
- Caspar David Friedrich (1774–1840), painter
- Dörte Gatermann (born 1956), architect
- Willi Glasauer (born 1938), artist
- Walter Gropius (1883–1969), architect
- George Grosz (1893–1959), artist
- Matthias Grünewald (c. 1470 – 1528), German Renaissance painter
- Johann Gottlieb Hantzsch (1794–1848), painter (genre works)
- Bettina Heinen-Ayech (1937–2020), painter
- Hannah Höch (1889–1978), artist
- Hans Holbein the Elder (c. 1465 – 1524), painter
- Hans Holbein the Younger (c. 1497 – 1543), illustrator and painter
- Jörg Immendorff (1945–2007), painter
- Helmut Jahn (1940–2021), architect and designer
- Horst Janssen (1929–1995), draftsman, graphic artist, woodcutter, watercolour painter, writer
- Ulli Kampelmann (born 1952), sculptor and painter
- Anselm Kiefer (born 1945), painter
- Martin Kippenberger (1953–1997), painter
- Ernst Ludwig Kirchner (1880–1938), painter
- Leo von Klenze (1784–1864), architect
- Hans Kollhoff (born 1946), architect
- Käthe Kollwitz (1867–1945), painter
- Christian Lemmerz (born 1959), sculptor and scenographer
- Max Liebermann (1847–1935), painter
- Markus Lüpertz (born 1941), painter and sculptor
- August Macke (1887–1914), painter
- Harro Magnussen (1861–1908), sculptor
- Franz Marc (1880–1916), painter
- Hans Memling (c. 1430 – 1494), painter
- Ludwig Mies van der Rohe (1886–1969), architect and designer
- Paula Modersohn-Becker (1876–1907), painter
- Georg Muche (1895–1987), painter, printmaker, architect, author and teacher
- Bill Kaulitz (born 1989), songwriter, composer, singer-songwriter, voice actor, film producer, and lyricist
- Tom Kaulitz (born 1989), songwriter, singer-songwriter, guitarist, pianist, voice actor, film producer, and lyricist
- Georg Listing (born 1987), bassist and pianist
- Gustav Schäfer (born 1988), musician and drummer

=== N–Z ===
- Helmut Newton (1920–2004), photographer
- Frei Otto (1925–2015), architect and research scientist
- Max Pechstein (1881–1955), painter
- Sigmar Polke (1941–2010), painter
- Gerhard Richter (born 1932), painter
- Julius Runge (1843–1922), marine painter
- Karl Friedrich Schinkel, architect and painter
- Oskar Schlemmer (1888–1943), choreographer, painter, sculptor and stage designer
- Eberhard Schlotter (1921–2014), painter
- Karl Schmidt-Rottluff (1884–1976), painter
- Kurt Schwitters, painter and poet
- Fritz Schumacher (1869–1947), architect and urban designer
- Max Slevogt, painter
- Carl Spitzweg (1808–1885), painter
- Birgit Stauch (born 1961), sculptor
- Fritz Stoltenberg (1855–1921), landscape artist and marine painter
- Franz Stuck (1863–1928), painter
- Yigal Tumarkin (1933–2021), Israeli painter and sculptor
- Wolf Vostell (1932–1998), artist
- Bertha Wehnert-Beckmann (1815–1901), pioneering female photographer
- Emilie Winkelmann (1875–1951), architect

== Company founders ==
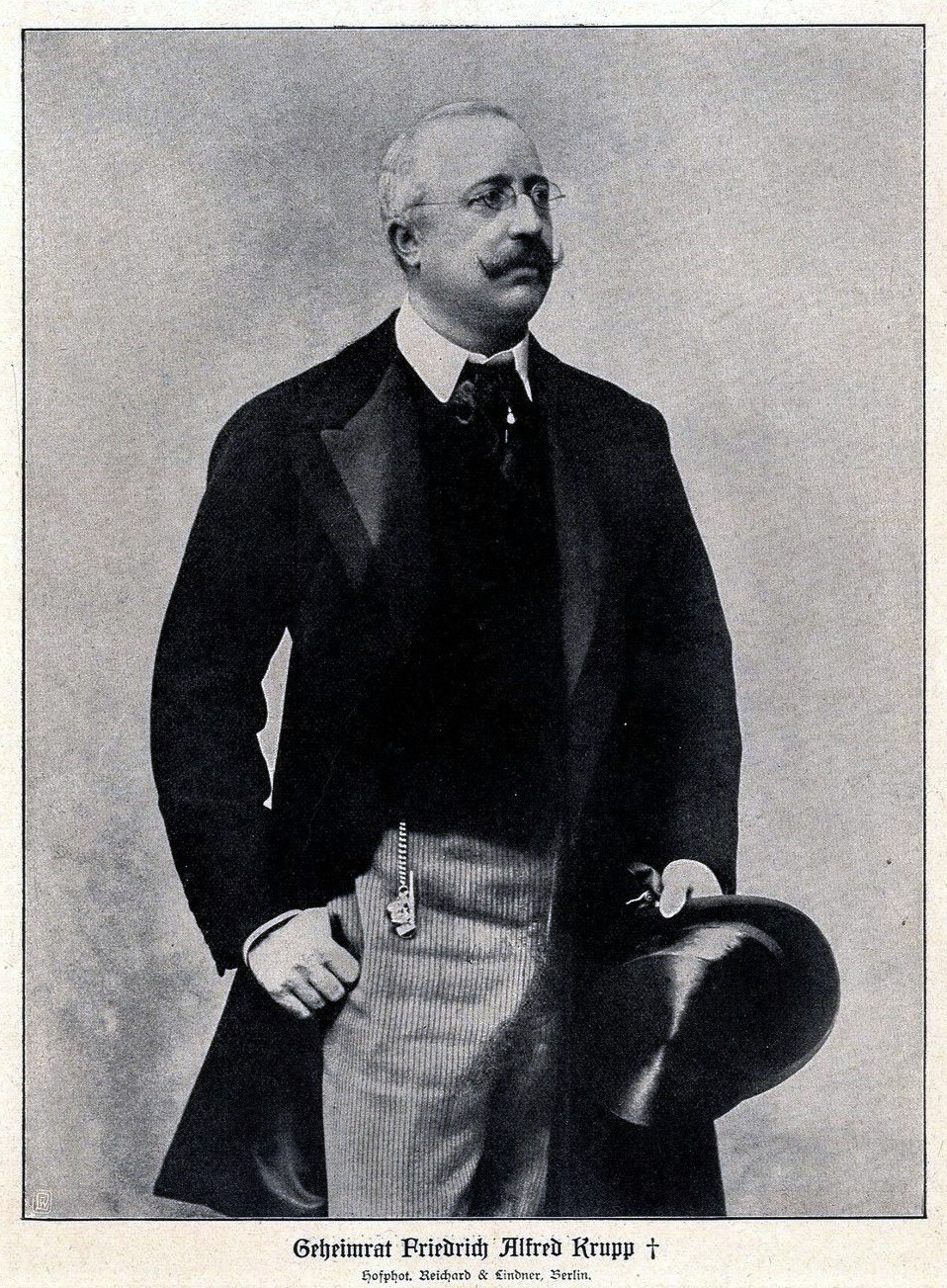
Friedrich Alfred Krupp

=== A–M ===
- Karl Albrecht (1920–2014) and Theo Albrecht (1922–2010), founder of Aldi
- Ludwig Bamberger (1823–1899), co-founder of Deutsche Bank
- John Jacob Bausch (1830–1926), co-founder of Bausch & Lomb, makers of contact lenses and Ray-Ban sunglasses
- Friedrich Bayer (1825–1880), founder of what would become Bayer, chemical and pharmaceutical company
- Hans Beck (1929–2009), founder of Playmobil
- Paul Beiersdorf (1836–1896), founded Beiersdorf AG, manufacturers of Nivea, Eucerin
- Melitta Bentz (1873–1950), invented the coffee filter and started Melitta, manufacturers of coffee, paper coffee filters and coffee makers
- Karl Benz (1844–1929), inventor of the gasoline-powered automobile; co-founder of the automobile manufacturer Mercedes-Benz
- Maximilian Delphinius Berlitz (1852–1921), founder of Berlitz Language Schools
- Carl Bertelsmann (1791–1850), founder of Bertelsmann AG, subsidiaries include Random House and BMG
- Johann Adam Birkenstock, in 1774 founded Birkenstock shoe company
- Hermann Blohm (1848–1930), in 1877, co-founder of Blohm+Voss, manufacturer of ships
- Carl F. W. Borgward (1890–1963), founder of Borgward
- August Borsig (1804–1854), founder of Borsig Werke
- Robert Bosch (1861–1942), industrialist, engineer and inventor; founder of Robert Bosch GmbH
- Hugo Boss (1885–1948), fashion designer, founder of Hugo Boss
- Max Braun, founder of Braun GmbH, makers of personal care appliances, coffee makers and other home appliances
- Adolphus Busch (1839–1913), co-founder of Anheuser-Busch brewing company
- Adolph Coors (1847–1929), founder of the Adolph Coors Company brewery, now part of MillerCoors
- Gottlieb Daimler (1834–1900), inventor and engineer; founder of Daimler Motoren Gesellschaft, now Daimler-Benz AG
- Adolf Dassler (1900–1978), founder of sportswear company Adidas
- Rudolf Dassler (1898–1974), founder of sportwear company Puma
- Adelbert Delbrück (1822–1899), co-founder of Deutsche Bank
- Guido Henckel von Donnersmarck (1830–1916), founder of company Schlesische AG für Bergbau und Zinkhüttenbetrieb
- Claude Dornier (1884–1969), founder of Dornier Flugzeugwerke
- Friedrich Engelhorn (1821–1902), founder of the chemical company BASF
- Kaspar Faber (1730–1784), founder of Faber-Castell, manufacturers of office supplies, art supplies, writing instruments and leather goods
- Günther Fielmann (1939–2024), founder of Fielmann
- Wilhelm von Finck (1848–1924), co-founder of Munich Re and Allianz
- Eduard Fresenius (1874–1946), founder of Fresenius
- Jakob Fugger the Elder (1368–1469), founder of Fugger bank
- Marcus Goldman (1821–1904), co-founder of Goldman Sachs
- Max Grundig (1908–1989), founder of Grundig
- Max Herz (1905–1965), co-founder of Tchibo
- Ernst Heinkel (1888–1958), founder of Heinkel, manufacturer of airplanes
- Richard Hellmann (1876–1971), founder of Hellmann's Mayonnaise
- Friedrich Karl Henkel (1848–1930), founder of Henkel
- J.A. Henckels, manufacturers of kitchen knives, scissors, cookware and flatware
- August Horch (1868–1951), founder of Audi automobile company in 1909
- Helmut Horten (1909–1987), founder of Horten AG
- August Howaldt (1809–1883), founder of Howaldtswerke-Deutsche Werft in 1835
- Hugo Junkers (1859–1935), founder of Junkers, manufacturer of airplanes in 1895
- Rudolph Karstadt (1856–1944), founder of Karstadt
- Ernst Keil (1816–1878), founder and publisher of Die Gartenlaube
- Carl Kellner (1826–1855), founder of Ernst Leitz GmbH, which later became Leica Camera AG, Leica Geosystems AG, and Leica Microsystems AG, producing cameras, geosurvey equipment and microscopes
- Peter Klöckner (1863–1940), founder of Klöckner-Humboldt-Deutz AG and Klöckner & Co
- Carl Heinrich Theodor Knorr (1800–1875) founder of Knorr
- Friedrich Krupp (1787–1826), steel manufacturer and founder of the steel producers ThyssenKrupp
- Heinrich Lanz (1838–1905), founder of Heinrich Lanz AG
- Henry Lehman (1822–1855), Emanuel Lehman (1827–1907) and Mayer Lehman (1830–1897), German-born bankers, co-founders of Lehman Brothers
- Carl von Linde (1842–1934), founder of The Linde Group
- Henry Lomb (1828–1908), co-founder of Bausch & Lomb
- Friedrich Lürssen (1851–1916), founder of Lürssen in 1875, manufacturers of ships
- Oscar Ferdinand Mayer (1859–1955), founder of the processed-meat firm Oscar Mayer
- Joseph Mendelssohn (1770–1848), founder of former bank Mendelssohn & Co.
- Friedrich Jacob Merck (1621–1678), founder of Merck KGaA (Engel-Apotheke in Darmstadt)
- George Merck (1867–1926), founder of Merck & Co.
- Willy Messerschmitt (1875–1978), founder of Messerschmitt, airplane manufacturer
- Heinrich Meyerfreund, founder of Garoto, chocolate company in Brazil
- Carl Miele (1869–1938), founder of Miele, manufacturer of domestic appliances
- Frederick Miller (born as Friedrich Eduard Johannes Müller) (1824–1888), founder of the Miller Brewing Company in 1855

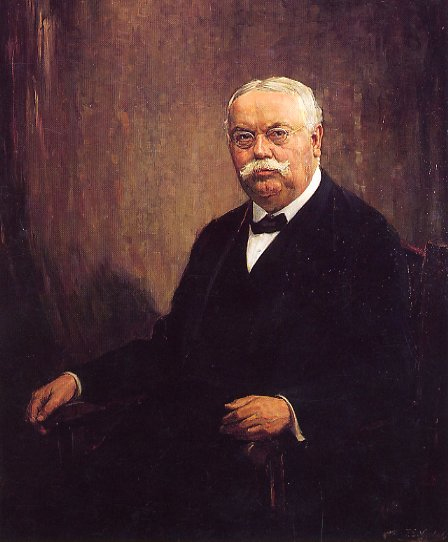
Dr. August Oetker

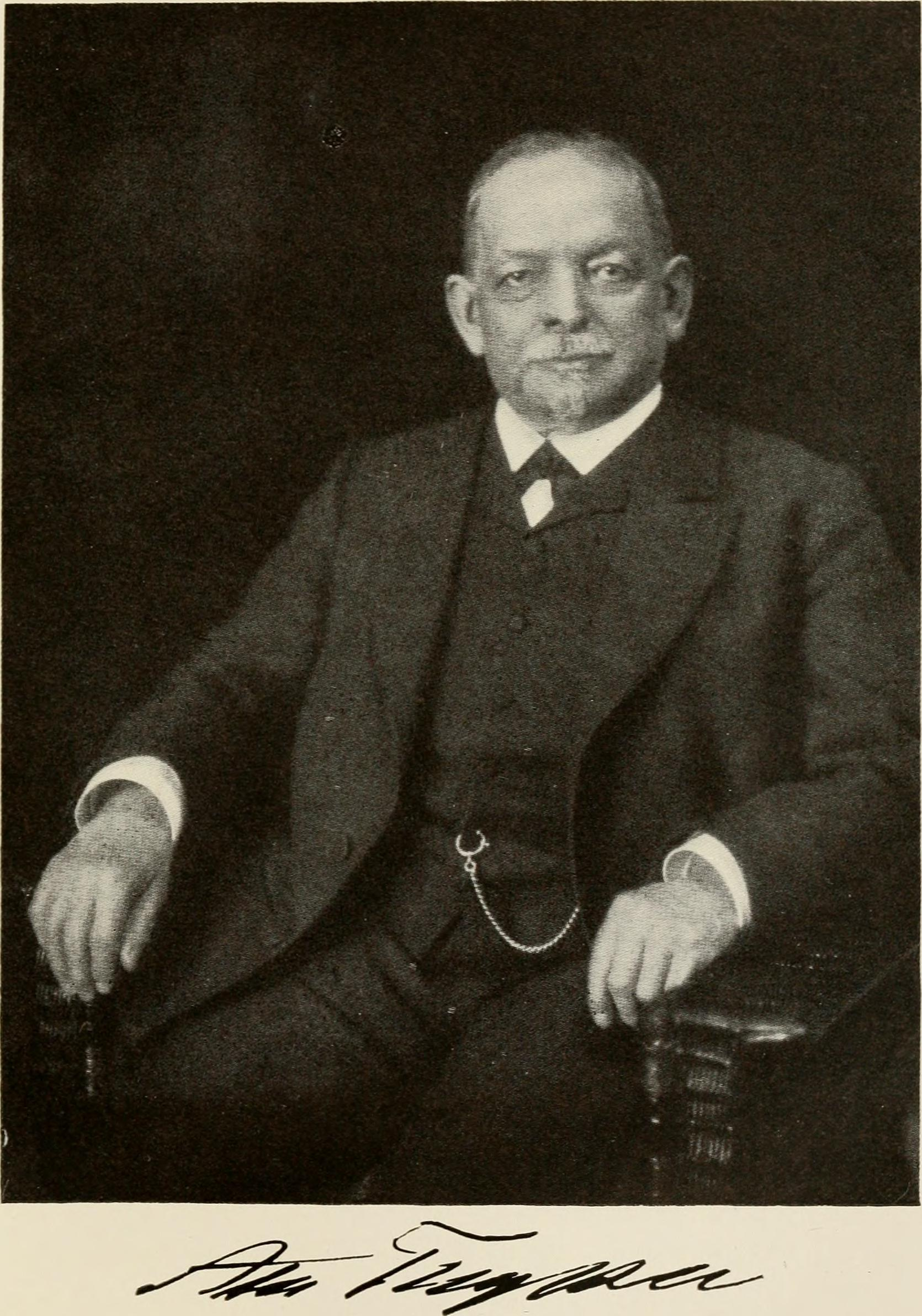
August Thyssen

=== N–Z ===
- Josef Neckermann (1912–1992), founder of the company Neckermann
- August Oetker (1862–1918), founder of the company Dr Oetker
- Adam Opel (1837–1895), founder of the automobile company Opel
- Salomon Oppenheim (1772–1828), founder of bank Sal. Oppenheim
- Ernest Oppenheimer (1880–1957), diamond and gold mining entrepreneur, financier and philanthropist, who controlled De Beers and founded the Anglo American Corporation of South Africa
- Werner Otto (1909–2011), founder of Otto GmbH, now Otto Group, a mail order company
- Ferdinand Porsche (1875–1951), designer and founder of Porsche
- Günther Quandt (1881–1954), industrial, entrepreneur of different companies (today includes BMW and Altana)
- Karl Friedrich Rapp (1882–1962), co-founder of Rapp Motorenwerke GmbH, which later became BMW
- Emil Rathenau (1838–1915), founder of AEG
- Paul Reuter (1816–1899), pioneer of telegraphy and news reporting; founder of Reuters news agency
- Hans Riegel, Sr. (1893–1945), founder of Haribo, manufacturer of gummy and jelly sweets
- Nathan Mayer Rothschild (1777–1836), founder of British company N M Rothschild & Sons
- Hugo Sack (1860–1909), cofounder of Sack & Kiesselbach and founder of Sack, GmbH
- Ernst Christian Friedrich Schering (1824–1889), founder of the pharmaceutical company Schering AG
- Gustav Schickedanz (1895–1977), founder of Quelle
- Anton Schlecker (born 1944), founder of Schlecker
- Ernst Schmidt and Wilhelm Schmidt-Ruthenbeck (1906–1988), founders of Metro AG
- Fritz Sennheiser (1912–2010), founder of Sennheiser Electronic GmbH & Co. KG, specializing in high fidelity products
- Georg von Siemens (1839–1901), co-founder of Deutsche Bank
- Werner von Siemens (1816–1892), inventor, founder of Siemens, electronics and electrical engineering company
- Axel Springer (1912–1985), publisher, founder of Axel Springer SE
- J.S. Staedtler, in 1835 founded Staedtler Mars GmbH & Co. KG, suppliers of writing, artist, and engineering drawing instruments
- Bruno Steinhoff (born 1937), founder of Steinhoff
- Henry E. Steinway (1797–1871), founder of the piano company Steinway & Sons
- Hugo Stinnes (1870–1924), co-founder of Rheinisch-Westfälisches Elektrizitätswerk AG
- August Storck-Oberwelland, in 1903 founder of Werther's Sugar Confectionery Factory, now August Storck AG
- Franz Ströher (born c. 1854–1936), in 1880 founded cosmetics company Wella
- Carl Tchilinghiryan (1910–1987), co-founder of Tchibo
- Carl von Thieme (1844–1924), founder of Allianz, financial services company
- August Thyssen (1842–1926), founder of Walzwerk Thyssen & Co. in Mülheim an der Ruhr
- Friedrich Thyssen (1804–1877), founder of Draht-Fabrik-Compagnie in Aachen
- Hermann Tietz (1837–1907), founder of Hertie, department store
- Leopold Ullstein (1826–1899), founder of publishing company Ullstein Verlag
- Ernst Voss (1842–1920), in 1877, co-founder of Blohm+Voss, manufacturer of ships
- Carl Walther (1858–1915), founder of Walther
- Moses Marcus Warburg (1763–1820) and Gershon Warburg (1765–1826), co-founder of M. M. Warburg & Co., German bank
- Siegmund Warburg, founder of S. G. Warburg & Co., British bank
- Bartholomeus V. Welser (1484–1561), Welser brothers bank
- Georg Wertheim (1857–1939), founder of Wertheim, department store
- Stef Wertheimer (1926–2025), German-born Israeli industrialist, investor, philanthropist, billionaire and Member of the Knesset
- Aloys Wobben (1952–2021), founder of Enercon
- Reinhold Würth (born 1935), company Würth
- Carl Zeiss (1816–1888), founder of Zeiss, maker of optical instruments
- Ferdinand von Zeppelin (1838–1917), inventor of the Zeppelin; founder of the Zeppelin Airship company

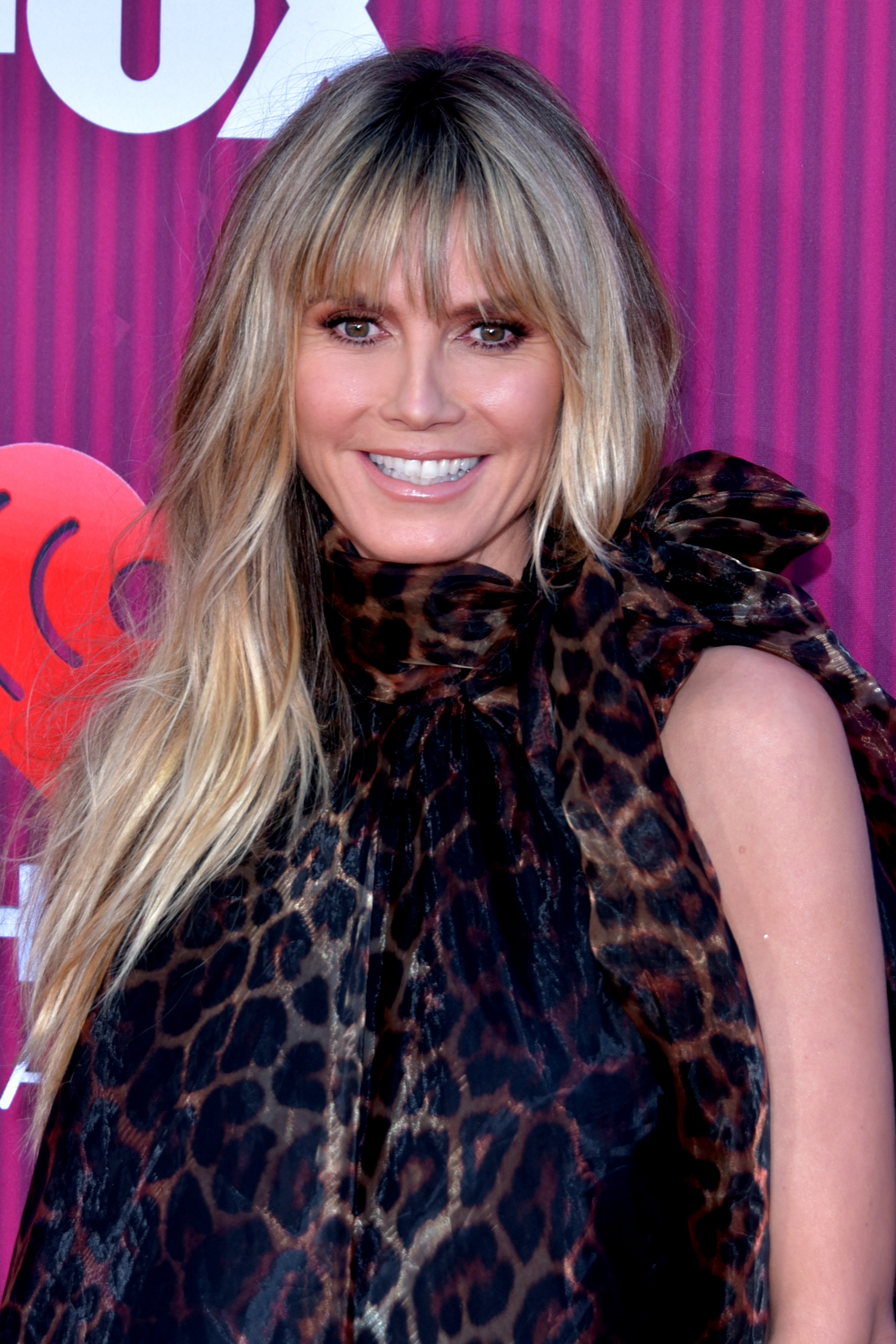
Heidi Klum

== Fashion models ==
- Nadja Auermann (born 1971), supermodel
- Eugen Bauder (born 1986)
- Charlott Cordes (born 1988)
- Toni Garrn (born 1992)
- Lena Gercke (born 1988), winner of 2006 Germany's Next Topmodel
- Stefanie Giesinger (born 1996), model
- Jennifer Hof (born 1991), winner of 2008 Germany's Next Topmodel
- Alexandra Kamp (born 1966)
- Heidi Klum (born 1973), model and host of Project Runway and Germany's Next Topmodel
- Diane Kruger (born 1976), model and actress
- Barbara Meier (born 1986), winner of 2007 Germany's Next Topmodel
- Nico (1938–1988), model, singer and actress
- Uschi Obermaier (born 1946), model and actress
- Eva Padberg (born 1980)
- Tatjana Patitz (1966–2023), supermodel
- Claudia Schiffer (born 1970), supermodel
- Julia Stegner (born 1984)

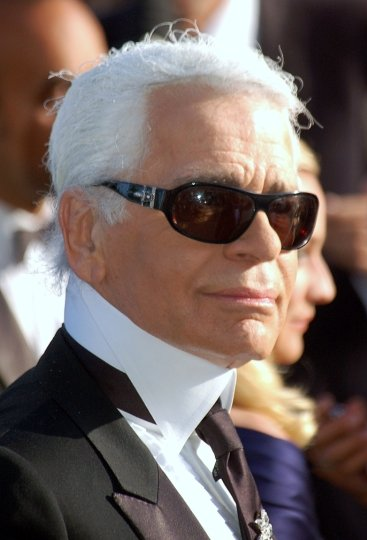
Karl Lagerfeld

== Fashionmakers ==
- Hugo Boss (1885–1948), fashion designer
- Wolfgang Joop (born 1944), fashion designer
- Karl Lagerfeld (1933–2019), fashion designer
- Michael Michalsky (born 1967), fashion designer

== Film and theatre ==
=== Actresses and actors ===
Hanna Maron

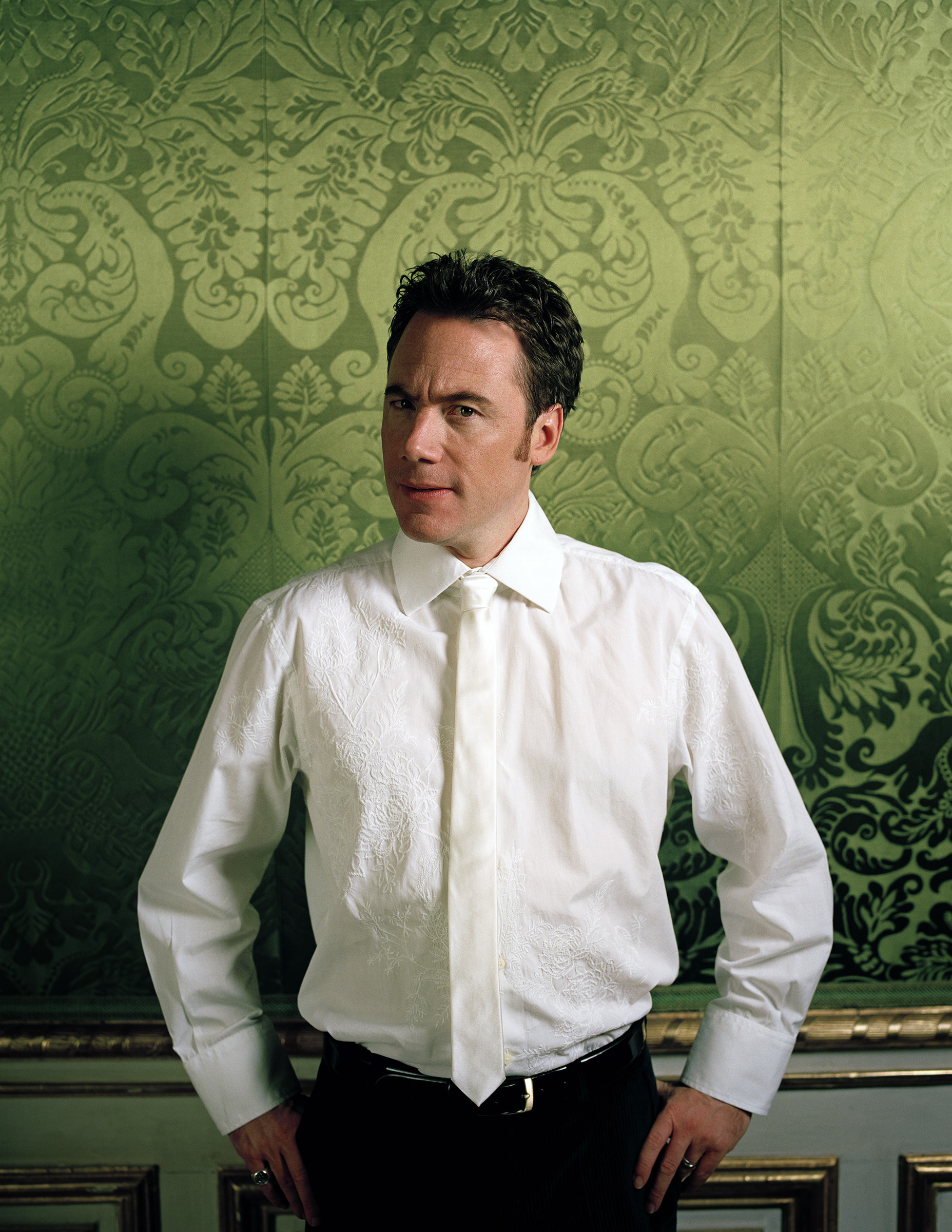
Michael Herbig

==== A–M ====
- Inga Abel (1946–2000), actress
- Mario Adorf (1930–2026), actor and writer
- Hans Albers (1891–1960), actor
- Iris Berben (born 1950), actress
- Moritz Bleibtreu (born 1971), actor
- Grit Boettcher (born 1938), actress
- Eric Braeden (born Hans Gudegast, 1941), actor
- Daniel Brühl (born 1978), actor
- Horst Buchholz (1933–2003), actor
- Vicco von Bülow (also known as Loriot), actor and comedian
- Zazie Beetz (born 1991), German born American actress
- Hans Clarin (1930–2005), actor
- August Diehl (born 1976), actor
- Marlene Dietrich (1901–1992), actress
- George Dzundza (born 1945), actor
- Heinz Erhardt (1909–1979), actor and comedian
- Veronica Ferres (born 1965), actress
- Gert Fröbe (1913–1988), actor
- Cornelia Froboess (born 1943), actress
- Martina Gedeck (born 1961), actress
- Götz George (1938–2016), actor
- Heinrich George (1893–1946), actor
- Gustaf Gründgens (1899–1963), actor
- Eva Habermann (born 1976), actress and model
- Evelyn Hamann (1942–2007), actress
- Brigitte Helm (1908–1996), actress
- Henriette Hendel-Schütz (1772–1849), stage actress, mimoplastic performer
- Michael Herbig (born 1968), actor, director and comedian
- Emil Jannings (1884–1950), actor
- Harald Juhnke (1929–2005), actor and comedian
- Heidi Kabel (1914–2010), actress
- Klaus Kinski (1926–1991), actor; Polish-German father, German mother
- Nastassja Kinski (born 1959), actress; daughter of actor Klaus Kinski
- Heidi Klum (born 1973), model and actress
- Hildegard Knef (1925–2002), actress, singer and writer
- Sebastian Koch (born 1962), actor
- Thomas Kretschmann (born 1962), actor and model
- Diane Kruger (born 1976), actress and model
- Alexandra Maria Lara (born 1978), actress
- Martin Lawrence (born 1965), actor
- Siegfried Lowitz (1914–1999), actor
- Heike Makatsch (born 1971), actress
- Hanna Maron (1923–2014), Israeli actress
- Inge Meysel (1910–2004), actress
- Brigitte Mira (1910–2005), actress
- Willy Millowitsch (1909–1999), actor
- Ulrich Mühe (1953–2007), actor
- Armin Mueller-Stahl (born 1930), actor

==== N–Z ====
- Luise Neumann (1818–1905)
- Uwe Ochsenknecht (born 1956), actor
- Christian Oliver (1972–2024), actor
- Lilli Palmer (1914–1986), actress
- Franka Potente (born 1974), actress
- Jürgen Prochnow (born 1941), actor
- Luise Rainer (1910–2014), actress
- Heinz Rühmann (1902–1994), actor
- Otto Sander (1941–2013), actor
- Claudia Schiffer (born 1970), actress and supermodel
- Romy Schneider (1938–1982), actress
- Jessica Schwarz (born 1977), actress
- Til Schweiger (born 1963), actor
- Matthias Schweighöfer (born 1981), actor
- Hanna Schygulla (born 1943), actress
- Xenia Seeberg (born 1972), actress and model
- Tomer Sisley (born 1974), Israeli humorist, actor, screenwriter, comedian, and film director
- Kristina Söderbaum (1912–2001), actress and photographer
- Günter Strack (1929–1999), actor
- Barbara Sukowa (born 1950), actress
- Horst Tappert (1923–2008), actor
- Katharina Thalbach (born 1954), actress
- Nora Tschirner (born 1981), actress
- Ulrich Tukur (born 1957), actor
- Nadja Uhl (born 1972), actress
- Wolfgang Völz (1930–2018), actor
- Fritz Wepper (1941–2024), actor
- Luise del Zopp (1871–1946), actress, opera singer, screenwriter

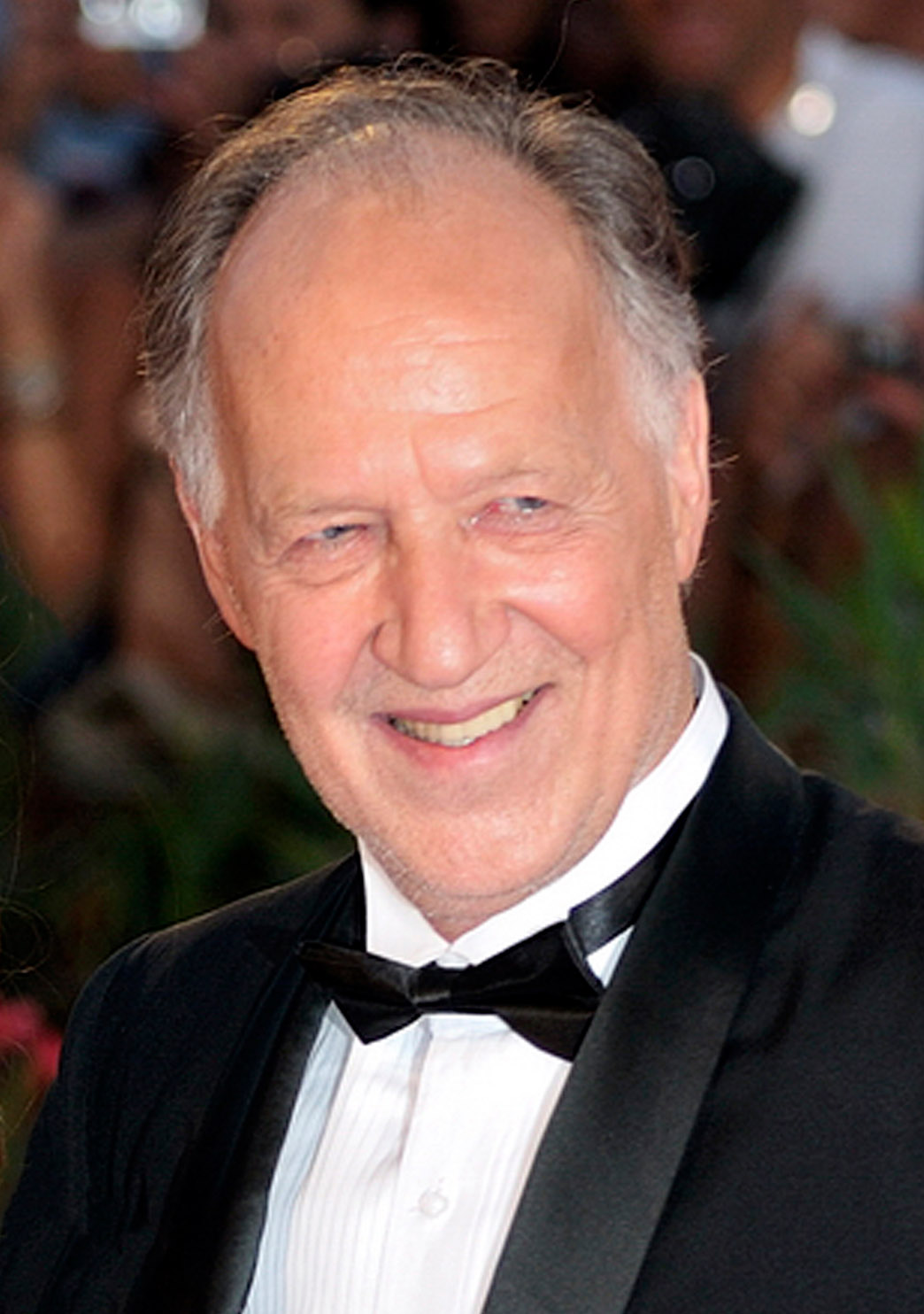
Werner Herzog

=== Filmmakers ===
- Uwe Boll, film director
- Andreas Deja, animator
- Doris Dörrie, female film director
- Bernd Eichinger (1949–2011), film producer
- Roland Emmerich (born 1955), film director (Stargate, Independence Day, Godzilla, The Day After Tomorrow)
- Harun Farocki (1944–2014), film director
- Rainer Werner Fassbinder (1945–1982), film director
- Florian Henckel von Donnersmarck, film director; Academy Award winner
- Werner Herzog (born 1942), film director
- Oliver Hirschbiegel, film director
- Alexander Kluge (born 1932), film director
- Carl Koch (1892–1963), film director and writer
- Fritz Lang (1890–1976), film director
- Ernst Lubitsch (1892–1947), film director
- F.W. Murnau (1888–1931), film director
- Wolfgang Petersen (1941–2022), film director
- Ashwin Raman (born 1946), documentary filmmaker
- Leni Riefenstahl (1902–2003), female film director
- Helma Sanders-Brahms (1940–2014), film director
- Peter Schamoni (1934–2011), film director
- Volker Schlöndorff (born 1939), film director
- Andreas Schnaas (born 1968), film director
- Hans-Jürgen Syberberg (born 1935), film director
- Tom Tykwer (born 1965), film director
- Margarethe von Trotta (born 1942), film director
- Robert Wiene, film director
- Wim Wenders (born 1945), film director
- William Wyler, (1902–1981), film director

== Literature ==
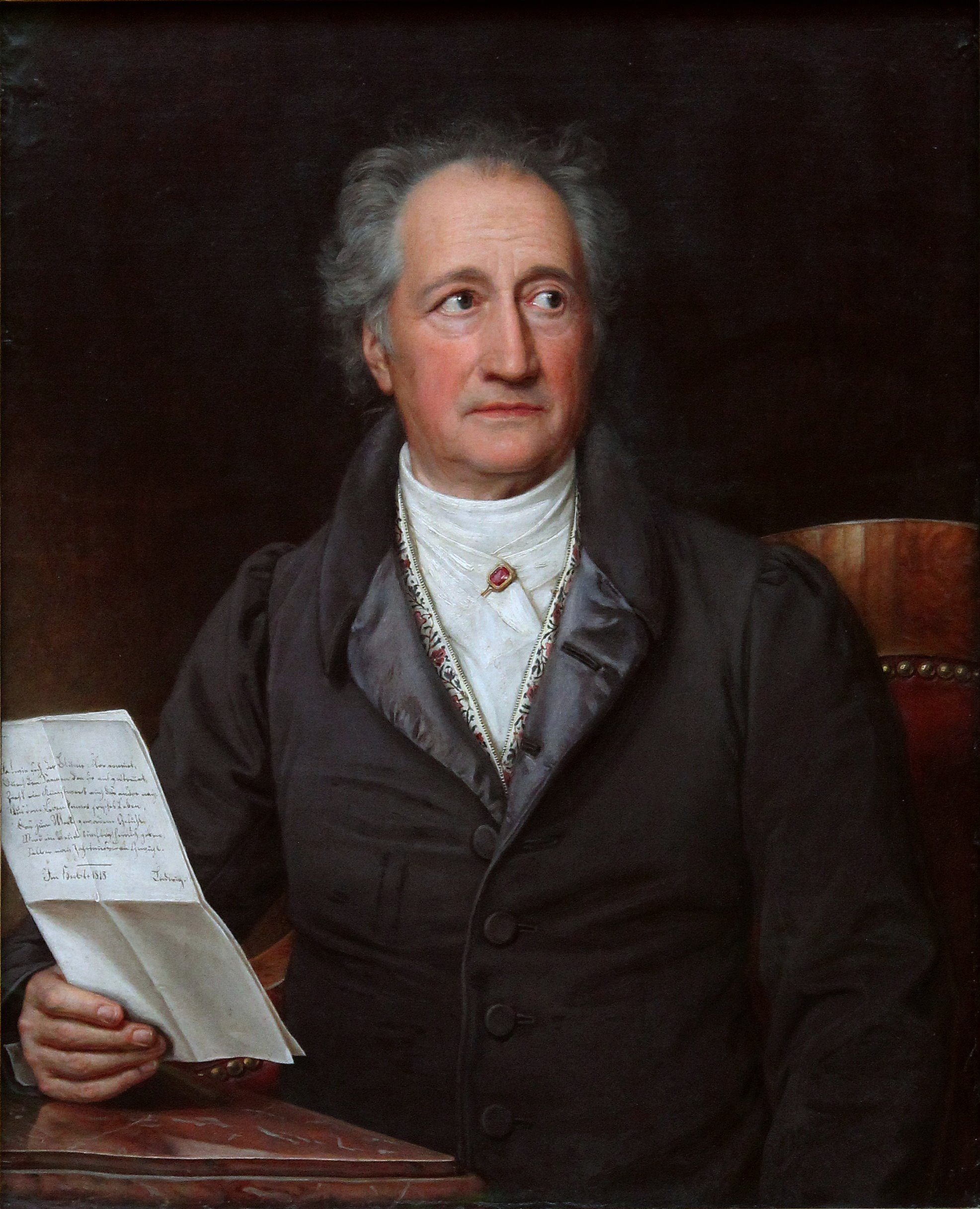
Johann Wolfgang von Goethe

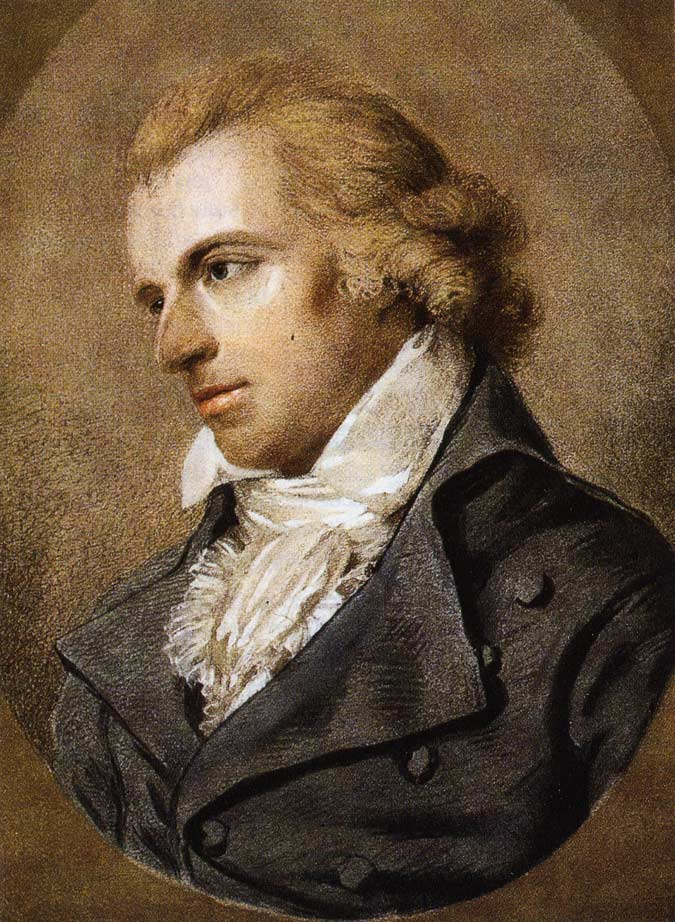
Friedrich Schiller

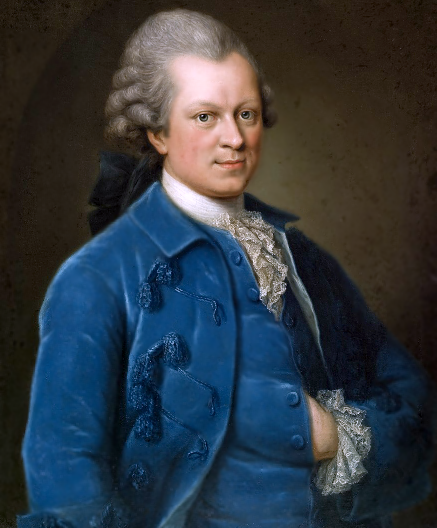
Gotthold Lessing

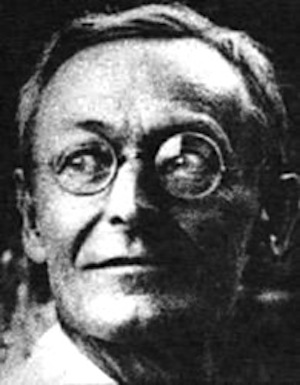
Hermann Hesse

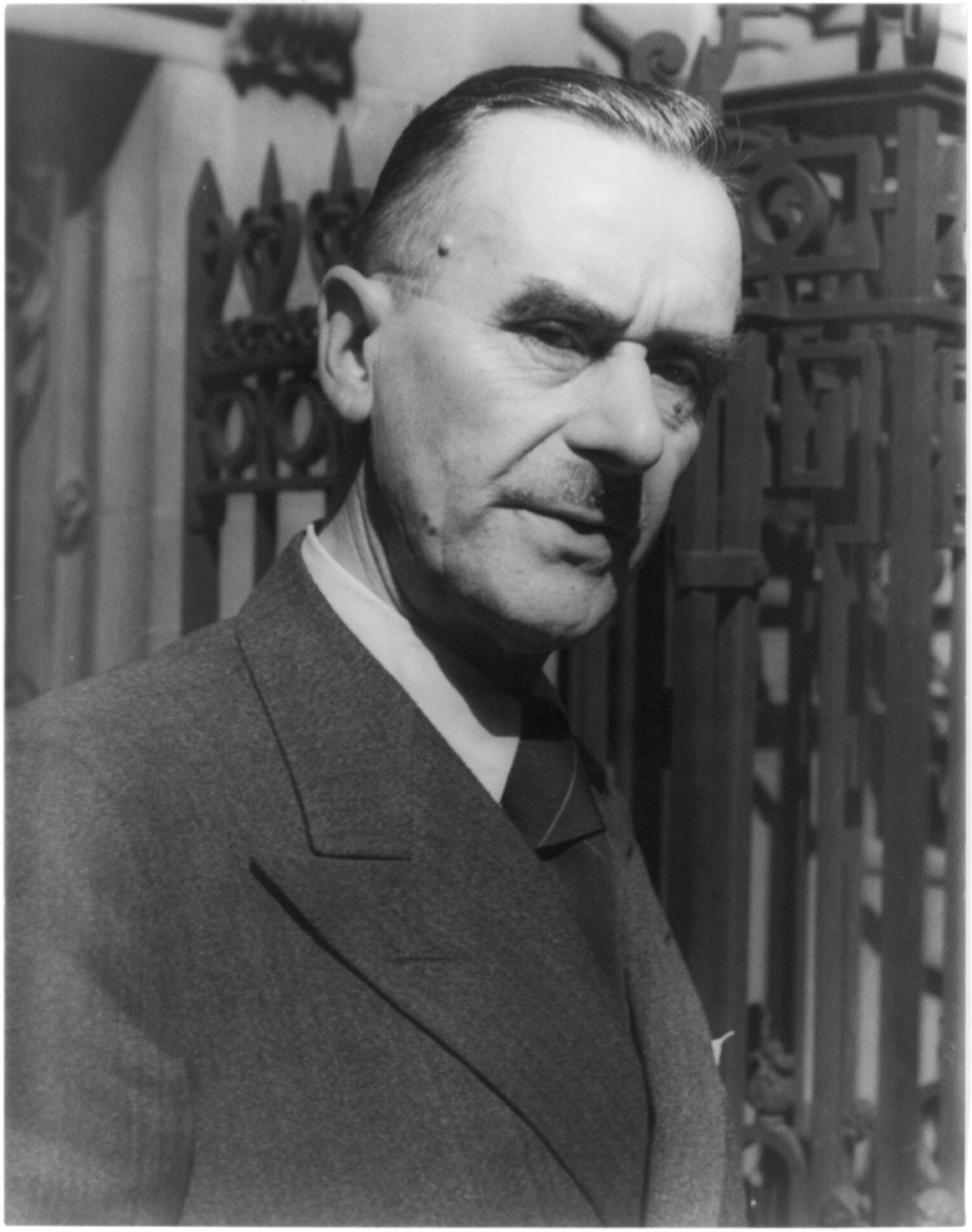
Thomas Mann

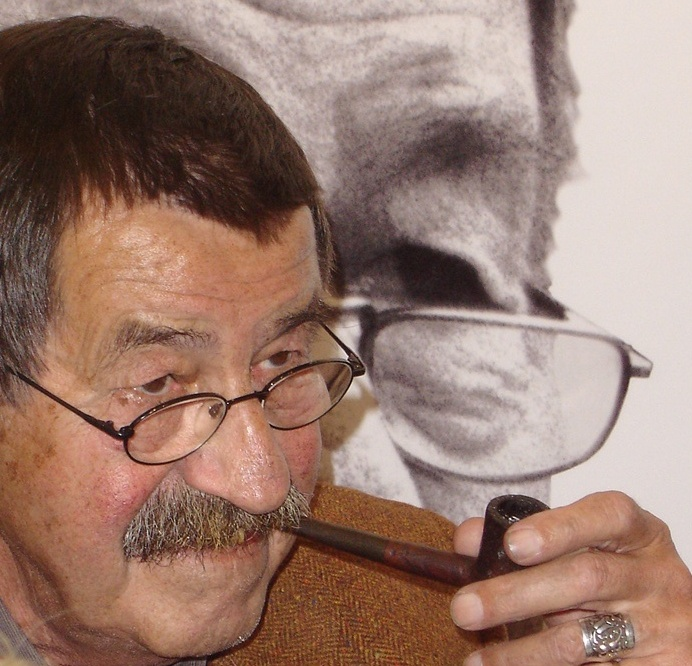
Günter Grass

=== Classic ===
- Adam of Bremen (c. 1050 – c. 1085), medieval chronicler
- Joseph von Auffenberg (1798–1857), dramatist
- Heinrich Böll (1917–1985), author
- Bertolt Brecht (1898–1956), playwright and poet
- Clemens Brentano (1778–1842), poet and novelist
- Georg Büchner, dramatist and author
- Charles Bukowski (1920–1994), German-born American poet, novelist, and short story writer
- Wilhelm Busch (1832–1908), poet and satirist
- Annette von Droste-Hülshoff (1797–1848), poet
- Joseph von Eichendorff (1788–1857), poet
- Theodor Fontane (1819–1898), novelist and poet
- Johann Wolfgang von Goethe (1749–1832), author and poet
- Brothers Grimm, collectors of fairy tales
- Heinrich Heine (1797–1856), poet
- Johann Gottfried Herder (1744–1803), essayist and poet
- Hermann Hesse (1877–1962), author
- E.T.A. Hoffmann (1776–1822), author
- Friedrich Hölderlin (1770–1843), poet
- Ernst Jünger (1895–1998), writer and novelist
- Erich Kästner (1899–1974), novelist
- Heinrich von Kleist (1777–1811), poet, dramatist and novelist
- Gotthold Lessing (1729–1781), writer
- Heinrich Mann (1871–1950), author (brother of Thomas Mann)
- Thomas Mann (1875–1955), author (brother of Heinrich Mann)
- Karl May (1842–1912), author
- Theodor Mommsen (1817–1903), A history of Rome
- Christian Morgenstern (1871–1914), poet
- Novalis (1772–1801), poet and novelist
- Erich Maria Remarque (1898–1970), novelist
- Friedrich Schiller (1759–1805), poet and playwright
- Arno Schmidt (1914–1979), writer
- Theodor Storm (1817–1888), author
- Kurt Tucholsky (1890–1935), writer and satirist
- Walter von der Vogelweide (c. 1170 – c. 1230), poet
- Christa Wolf (1929–2011), novelist and essayist
- Wolfram von Eschenbach (died 1220), poet

=== Major ===
- Yehuda Amichai (born Ludwig Pfeuffer; 1924–2000), German-born Israeli poet
- Ernst Moritz Arndt, poet, songwriter and patriot
- Achim von Arnim (1781–1831), poet
- Bettina von Arnim (1785–1859), writer and novelist
- Ezriel Carlebach (1909–1956), Israeli journalist and editorial writer
- Matthias Claudius (1740–1815), poet and writer
- Michael Ende (1929–1995), author of fantasy novels and children's books
- Erik Erikson (1902–1994), German-American writer, developmental psychologist and psychoanalyst
- Anne Frank (1929–1945), diarist and victim of the Holocaust
- Paul Gerhardt (c. 1606 – 1676), hymn writer
- Leah Goldberg (1911–1970), Israeli poet
- Joseph Görres (1776–1848), essayist
- Wilhelm Hauff (1802–1827), writer
- Paul Heyse (1830–1914), writer and translator
- Janosch (born 1931), author of artist and children's books
- Friedrich Kellner (1885–1970), diarist of My Opposition
- Golo Mann (1909–1994), author and historian (second-oldest son of Thomas Mann)
- Klaus Mann (1906–1949), author (oldest son of Thomas Mann)
- Friedrich de la Motte Fouqué (1777–1843), writer
- Prince Hermann von Pückler-Muskau (1785–1871), writer and landscape gardener
- Otfried Preussler (1923–2013), author of children's books
- Wilhelm Raabe (1831–1910), novelist
- Peter Rühmkorf (1929–2008), poet
- Nelly Sachs (1891–1970), poet
- Leopold Schefer (1784–1861), writer, poet and composer
- August Wilhelm Schlegel (1767–1845), poet and translator
- Ludwig Tieck (1773–1853), poet, editor and novelist
- Ludwig Uhland (1787–1862), poet, writer and playwright
- Gero von Wilpert (1933–2009), essayist

=== Contemporary ===
- Hans Magnus Enzensberger (1929–2022), essayist and poet
- Günter Grass (1927–2015), author; recipient, 1999 Nobel Prize in Literature
- Peter Härtling (1933–2017), author
- Rolf Hochhuth (1931–2020), playwright
- Wladimir Kaminer (born 1967), short story writer
- Daniel Kehlmann (born 1975), novelist
- Siegfried Lenz (1926–2014), author
- Ferdinand von Schirach (born 1964), author, screenwriter and lawyer
- Bernhard Schlink (born 1944), author and professor of law
- Patrick Süskind (born 1949), author and screenwriter
- Rudolf von Waldenfels (born 1965), author
- Martin Walser (1927–2023), playwright and novelist

== Humorists, cabaret performers and comedians ==
- Dieter Hildebrandt (1927–2013), cabaret performer
- Bruno Jonas (born 1952), cabaret performer
- Michael Mittermeier (born 1966), comedian
- Georg Schramm (born 1949), cabaret performer
- Mathias Richling (born 1953), cabaret performer
- Richard Rogler (1949–2024), cabaret performer
- Daniel Tosh (born 1975), comedian

== Journalists ==
- Rudolf Augstein (1923–2002), journalist
- Peter Limbourg (born 1960), journalist
- Marion Dönhoff (1909–2002), journalist
- Günther Jauch (born 1956), journalist
- Sabine Christiansen (born 1957), journalist
- Maybrit Illner (born 1965), journalist
- Anne Will (born 1966), journalist
- Sandra Maischberger (born 1966), journalist

== Mathematicians ==
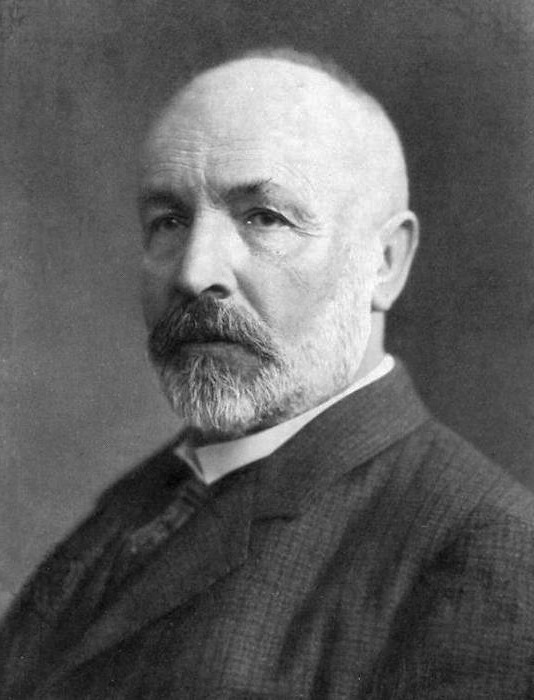
Georg Cantor

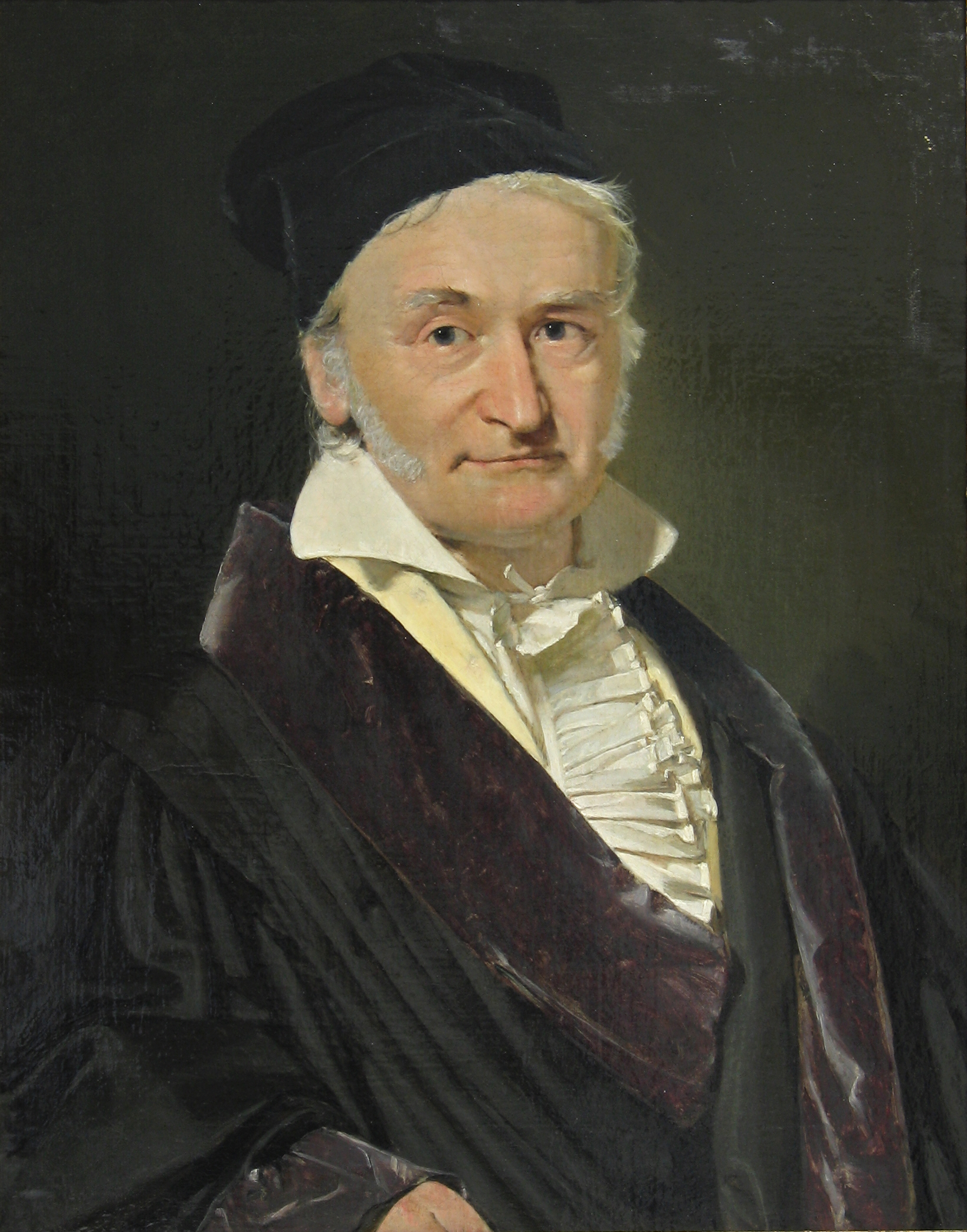
Carl Friedrich Gauss

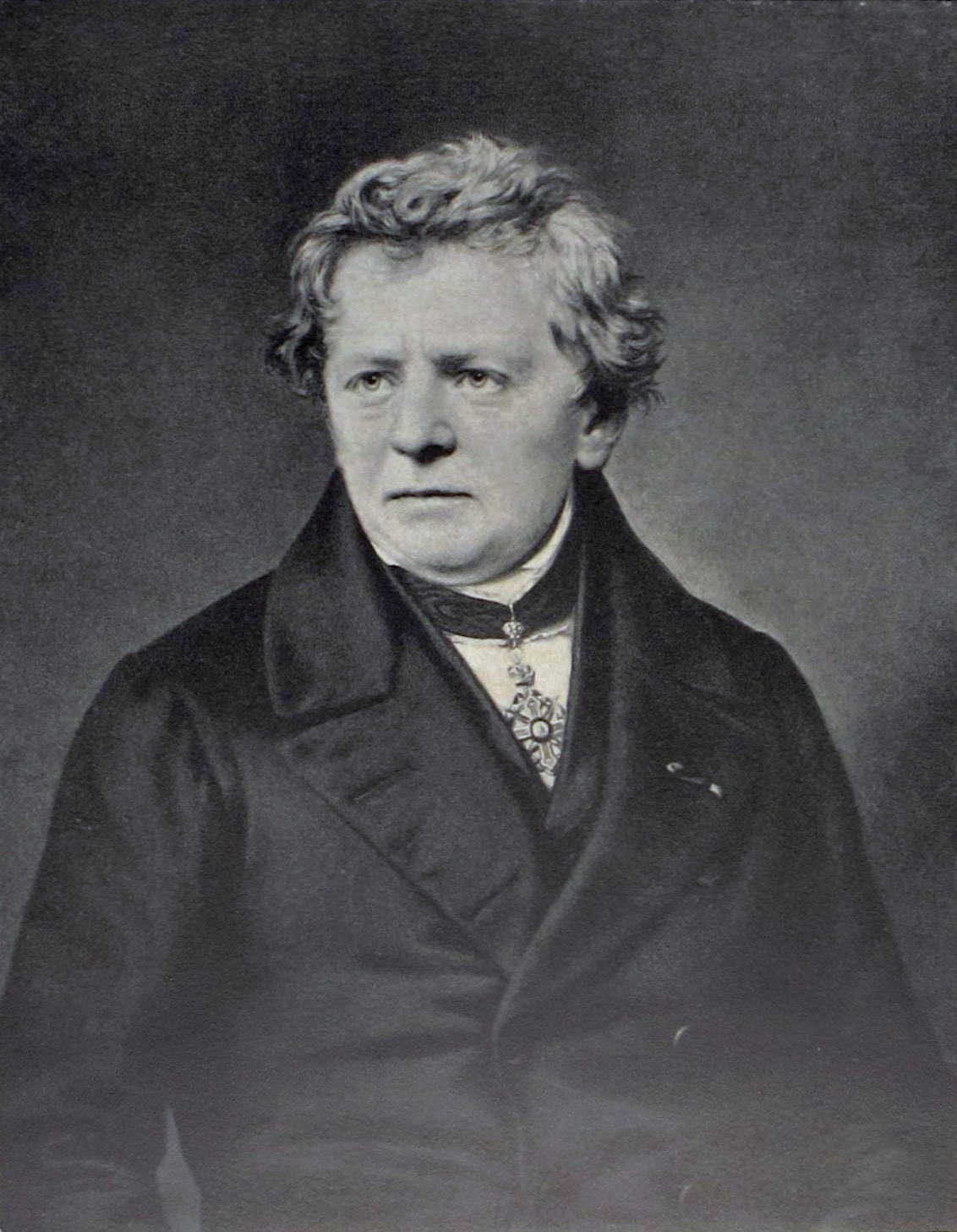
Georg Ohm

- Wilhelm Ackermann (1896–1962), mathematician
- Georg Cantor (1845–1918), mathematician
- Richard Dedekind (1831–1916), mathematician
- Walther von Dyck (1856–1934), mathematician
- Albert Einstein (1879–1955), mathematician, physicist
- Gottlob Frege (1848–1925), mathematician
- Philipp Furtwängler (1869–1940), mathematician
- Carl Friedrich Gauss (1777–1855), mathematician
- Ernst Hellinger (1883–1950), mathematician
- David Hilbert (1862–1943), mathematician
- Carl Gustav Jacob Jacobi (1804–1851), mathematician
- Erich Kähler (1906–2000), mathematician
- Johannes Kepler (1571–1630), mathematician and astronomer
- Felix Christian Klein (1849–1925), mathematician
- Hermann Klaus Hugo Weyl (1885–1955), mathematician
- Gottfried Wilhelm Leibniz (1646–1716), mathematician
- Kurt Mendelssohn (1906–1980), mathematician
- Hermann Minkowski (1864–1909), mathematician
- August Ferdinand Möbius (1790–1868), mathematician, theoretical astronomer
- Carl Neumann (1832–1925), mathematician
- Emmy Noether (1882–1935), mathematician
- Georg Ohm (1789–1854), mathematician
- Carl Adam Petri (1926–2010), mathematician, computer scientist
- Julius Plücker (1801–1868), mathematician
- Bernhard Riemann (1826–1866), mathematician
- Adam Ries (1492–1559), mathematician, physicist, archeologist
- Gustav Roch (1839–1866) mathematician
- Eric Reissner (1913–1996), mathematician, engineer
- Carl David Tolmé Runge (1856–1927), mathematician, physicist, spectroscopist
- Heinrich Scherk (1798–1885), mathematician
- Hermann Schwarz (1843–1921), mathematician
- Carl Ludwig Siegel (1896–1981), mathematician
- Roland Sprague (1894–1967), mathematician
- Heinrich Martin Weber (1842–1913), mathematician
- Karl Weierstrass (1815–1897), mathematician
- Max Zorn (1906–1993), mathematician

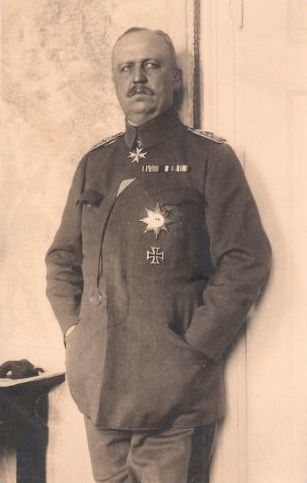
Erich Ludendorff

== Military ==
- Heinrich Bürkle de la Camp (1895–1974), general who specialized as a medic and army doctor
- Carl von Clausewitz (1780–1831), Prussian professional soldier, military historian, and influential military theorist
- Erich von Falkenhayn (1861–1922), general, Prussian Minister of War (1913–1915) and Chief of General Staff (1914–1916)
- August von Gneisenau (1760–1831), Prussian field marshal and chief of the Prussian General Staff (1813–1814)
- Heinz Guderian (1888–1954), military theorist and innovative general (1907–1945)
- Erich Hartmann (1922–1993), fighter pilot and air ace (1941–1970)
- Gotthard Heinrici (1886–1971), Premier Defensive Expert of the Wehrmacht (1905–1945)
- Hermann Hohn (1897–1968), Wehrmacht general
- Alfred Jodl (1890–1946), general, operations chief of the OKW
- Günther von Kluge (1882–1944), field marshal and commander of the Fourth Army (1939–1941) and Army Group Center (1941–43)
- Erich Ludendorff (1865–1937), general and Quartermaster General (1916–1918)
- Erich von Manstein (1887–1973), field marshal and professional soldier (1906–1944)
- Helmuth von Moltke the Elder (1800–1891), field marshal, chief of staff of the Prussian Army for thirty years
- Friedrich Paulus (1890–1957), general and commander of the German Sixth Army, later promoted to Field Marshal (1910–1943)
- Günther Rall (1918–2009), third highest scoring fighter ace in history with 275 confirmed kills while serving as a pilot in the Luftwaffe in World War II
- Manfred von Richthofen, also known as the Red Baron (1892–1918), fighter pilot and air ace
- Erwin Rommel (1891–1944), field marshal and commander of Afrika Korps (1942–1943) and Army Group B (1944)
- Albrecht von Roon (1803–1879), field marshal, Minister of War from (1859–1873)
- Hans-Ulrich Rudel (1916–1982), Stuka dive-bomber pilot and air ace (1936–1945)
- Gerd von Rundstedt (1875–1953), field marshal and commander (1892–1945)
- Alfred von Schlieffen (1833–1913), field marshal, Strategist and Chief of General Staff (1891–1905)
- Gerhard von Scharnhorst (1755–1813), general and Prussian Minister of War (1808–1810)
- Michael Wittmann (1914–1944), SS captain and tank ace (1934–1944)

== Music ==
=== Composers ===
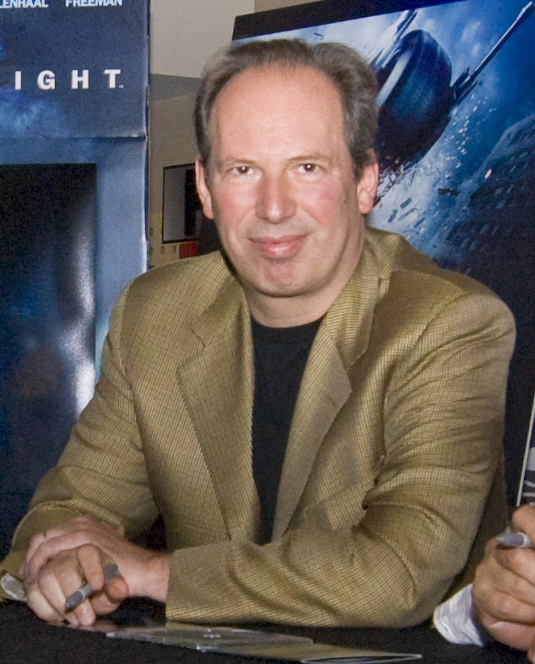
Hans Zimmer

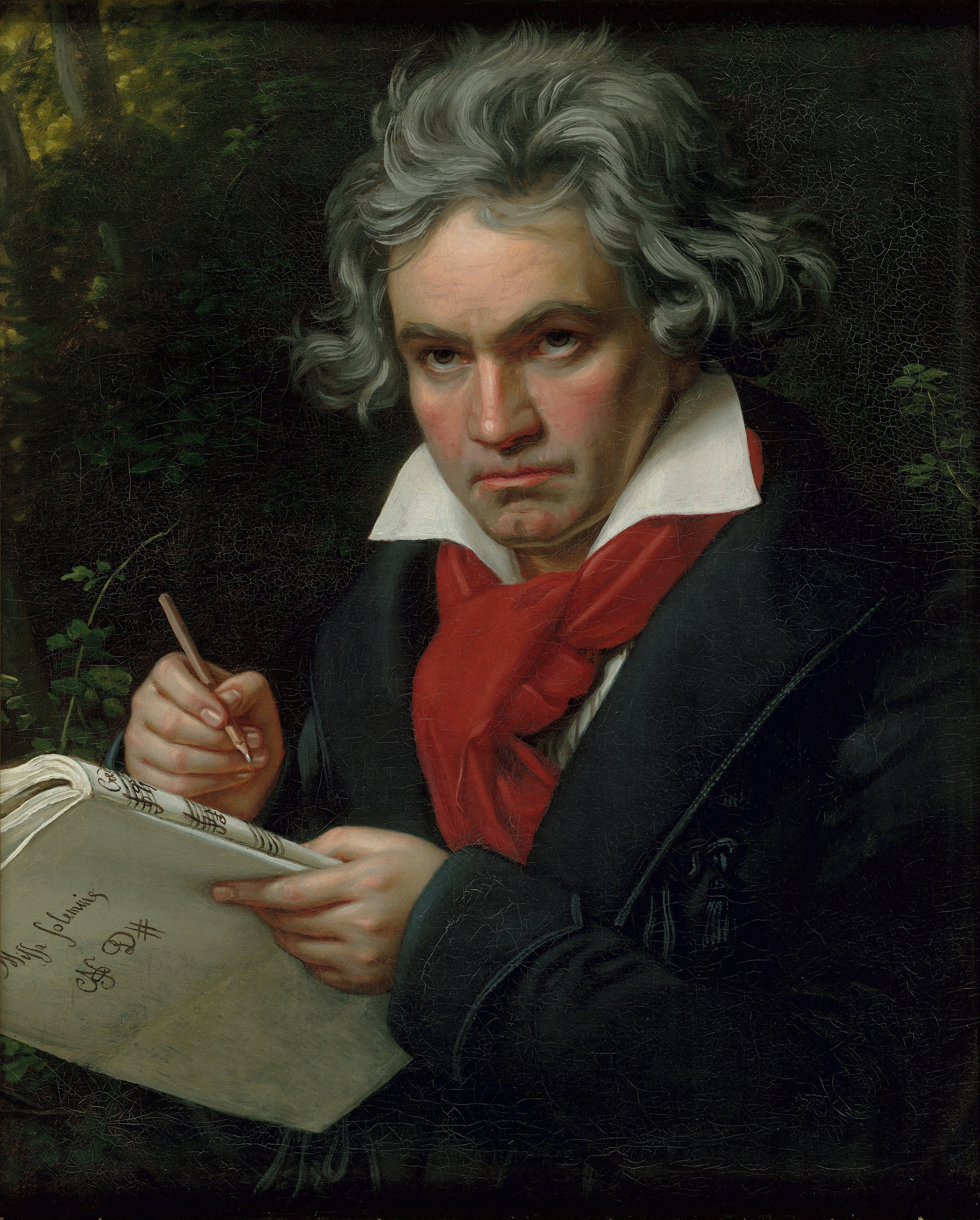
Ludwig van Beethoven

- Carl Friedrich Abel (1725–1787), composer
- Martin Agricola (1466–1506), composer
- Siegfried Alkan (1858–1941), composer
- Carl Philipp Emanuel Bach (1714–1788), composer; son of Johann Sebastian Bach
- Johann Christian Bach (1735–1782), composer; son of Johann Sebastian Bach
- Johann Sebastian Bach (1685–1750), composer
- Klaus Badelt (born 1967), film composer (Pirates of the Caribbean: The Curse of the Black Pearl, Miami Vice, Ultraviolet, 2008 Summer Olympics closing ceremony in Beijing)
- Ludwig van Beethoven (1770–1827), composer
- Martin Böttcher (1927–2019), film composer (Karl May film adaptations)
- Johannes Brahms (1833–1897), composer
- Max Bruch (1838–1920), composer
- Dieterich Buxtehude (c. 1637/39–1707), Danish-German organist and composer of the Baroque period
- Hanns Eisler (1898–1962), composer
- Friedrich von Flotow (1812–1883), composer
- Christoph Willibald Gluck (1714–1787), composer
- Georg Friedrich Händel (1685–1759), composer, opera composer
- Fanny Hensel (1805–1847), composer
- Paul Hindemith (1895–1963), composer
- Engelbert Humperdinck (1854–1921), composer
- Albert Lortzing (1801–1851), composer
- Giacomo Meyerbeer (1791–1864), composer
- Felix Mendelssohn (1809–1847), composer
- Leopold Mozart (1719–1787), composer, conductor, teacher, and violinist; father of Wolfgang Amadeus Mozart
- Jacques Offenbach (1819–1880), composer
- Carl Orff (1895–1982), composer
- Johann Pachelbel (1653–1706), composer
- Hans Pfitzner (1869–1949), composer
- Max Reger (1873–1916), composer
- Wolfgang Rihm (1952–2024), composer
- Leopold Schefer (1784–1862), writer and composer
- Clara Schumann (1819–1896), composer
- Robert Schumann (1810–1856), composer and songwriter
- Heinrich Schütz (1585–1672), composer
- Charlotte Seither (born 1965), classical composer, pianist and music educator
- Karlheinz Stockhausen (1928–2007), modern composer
- Richard Strauss (1864–1949), composer, opera composer
- Georg Philipp Telemann (1681–1767), composer
- Richard Wagner (1813–1883), composer
- Carl Maria von Weber (1786–1826), composer
- Kurt Weill (1900–1950), composer (The Threepenny Opera, "September Song")
- Hans Zimmer (born 1957), film composer (The Lion King, Crimson Tide, Gladiator, The Dark Knight, Inception, Dune)

=== Conductors, instrumentalists and singers ===
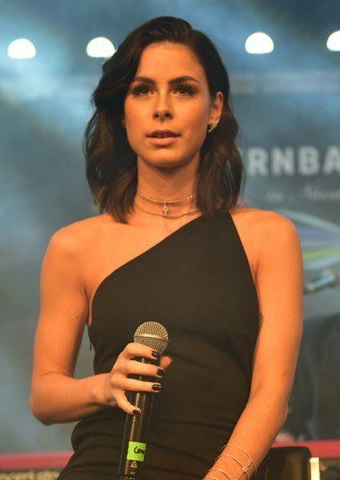
Lena Meyer-Landrut

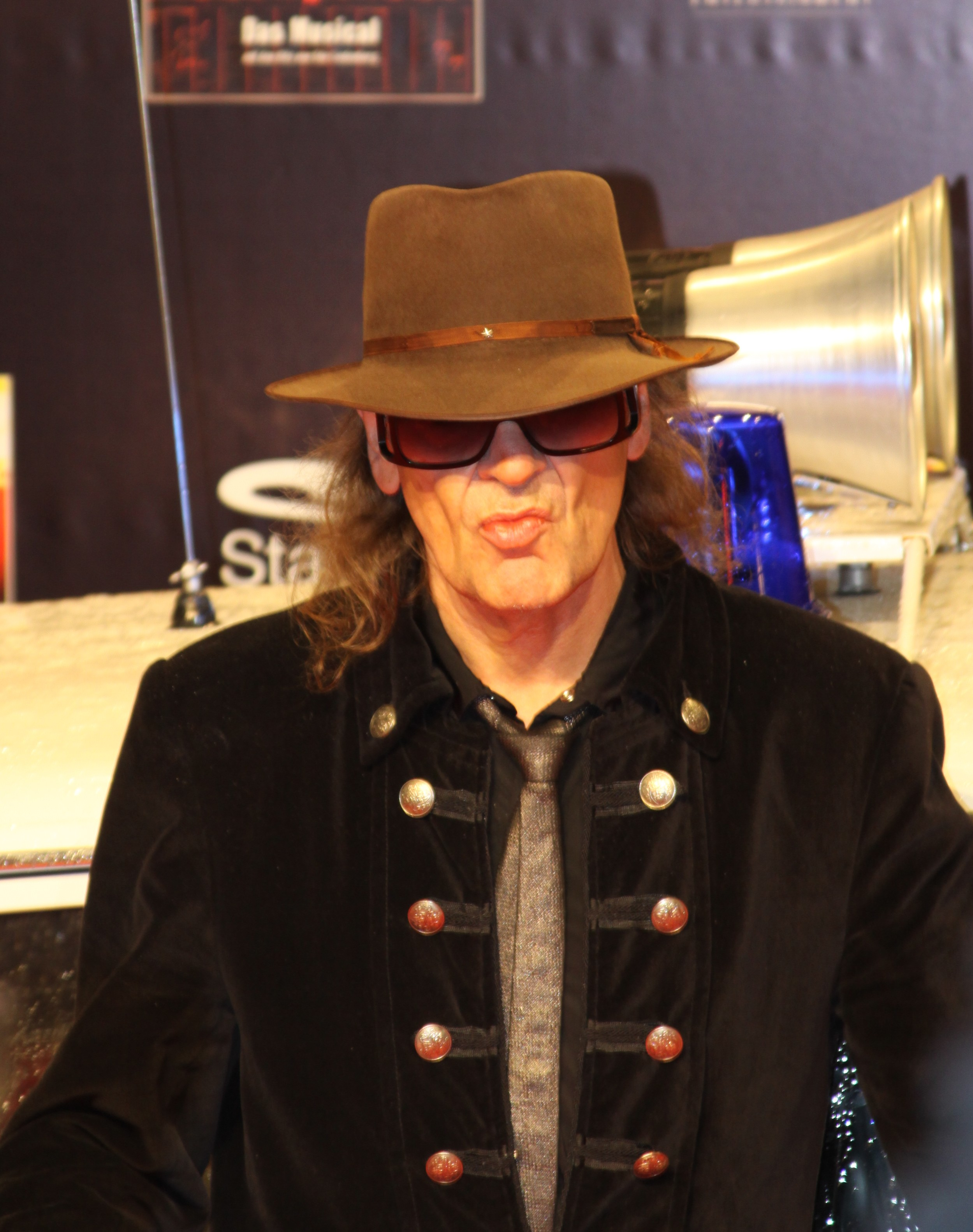
Udo Lindenberg

==== A–M ====
- Hans Albers (1891–1960), singer and actor
- Thomas Anders (born 1963), singer
- Lale Andersen (1905–1972), singer
- Lou Bega (born 1975), singer
- Andrea Berg (born 1966), singer-songwriter
- Wolf Biermann (born 1936), singer-songwriter and East German dissident
- Dieter Bohlen (born 1954), music producer
- Andreas Bourani (born 1983), singer-songwriter
- Hans-Jürgen Buchner (born 1944), founder, composer, songwriter of the band Haindling
- Fritz Busch (1890–1951), conductor
- Bushido (born 1978), rapper
- Campino (born 1962), lead singer of the band Die Toten Hosen
- Yvonne Catterfeld (born 1979), singer
- Sarah Connor (born 1980), pop and soul singer
- Michael (born 1957) and Sandra Cretu (born 1962), founders and performers of the musical project Enigma and the group Sandra
- Diana Damrau (born 1971), coloratura soprano opera singer
- Marlene Dietrich (1901–1992), singer
- Herbert Dreilich (1942–2004), singer of the Band Karat
- Jürgen Drews (born 1945), singer
- Katja Ebstein (born 1945), singer
- Fancy (born 1946), singer
- Frank Farian (1941–2024), German record producer and songwriter
- Helene Fischer (born 1984), singer
- Gertrude Förstel (1880–1950), operatic soprano, voice teacher
- Peter Fox (born 1971), singer
- Thekla Friedländer (1849–?), soprano and social reformer
- Wilhelm Furtwängler (1886–1954), conductor and composer
- Rex Gildo (1936–1999), singer
- Bernd Heinrich Graf, lead singer of the Band Unheilig
- Antye Greie (born 1969), vocalist, musician and composer
- Herbert Grönemeyer (born 1956), singer
- Gudrun Gut (born 1957), electronic musician
- Nina Hagen (born 1955), singer
- Heino (born 1938), pop singer
- Willy Hess (1859–1939), violinist
- Natalie Horler (born 1981), member of the band Cascada
- Torben Holzhausen (unknown-present) Member of the band Abenteuer Wildnis
- Annette Humpe (born 1950), singer of the bands Ideal and Ich + Ich
- Matthias Jabs (born 1955), guitarist of the band Scorpions
- Roland Kaiser (born 1952), singer
- Bill Kaulitz (born 1989), lead singer of the band Tokio Hotel
- John Kay (musician) (born 1944), German–Canadian musician
- Zah1de (born 2010), rapper
- Jonas Kaufmann (born 1969), operatic tenor
- Gershon Kingsley (1922–2019), composer
- Alexander Klaws (born 1983), singer
- Hildegard Knef (1925–2002), singer
- Peter Kraus (born 1939), singer
- Mike Kogel (born 1944), lead singer of the band Los Bravos
- Rolf Köhler (1951–2007), singer, musician and record producer
- Paul Kuhn (1928–2013), band leader and singer
- LaFee (born 1990), singer
- Ute Lemper (born 1963), singer
- Udo Lindenberg (born 1946), singer
- Michail Lifits (born 1982), concert pianist
- Till Lindemann (born 1963), lead singer of the band Rammstein
- Georg Listing, bassist of the band Tokio Hotel
- Frida Lyngstad (born 1945), lead singer of the pop group ABBA
- Peter Maffay (born 1949), singer
- Klaus Meine (born 1948), vocalist of the band Scorpions
- Reinhard Mey (born 1942)
- Lena Meyer-Landrut (born 1991), singer
- Marius Müller-Westernhagen (born 1948), singer
- Karl Münchinger (1915–1990), conductor
- Anne-Sophie Mutter (born 1963), violinist

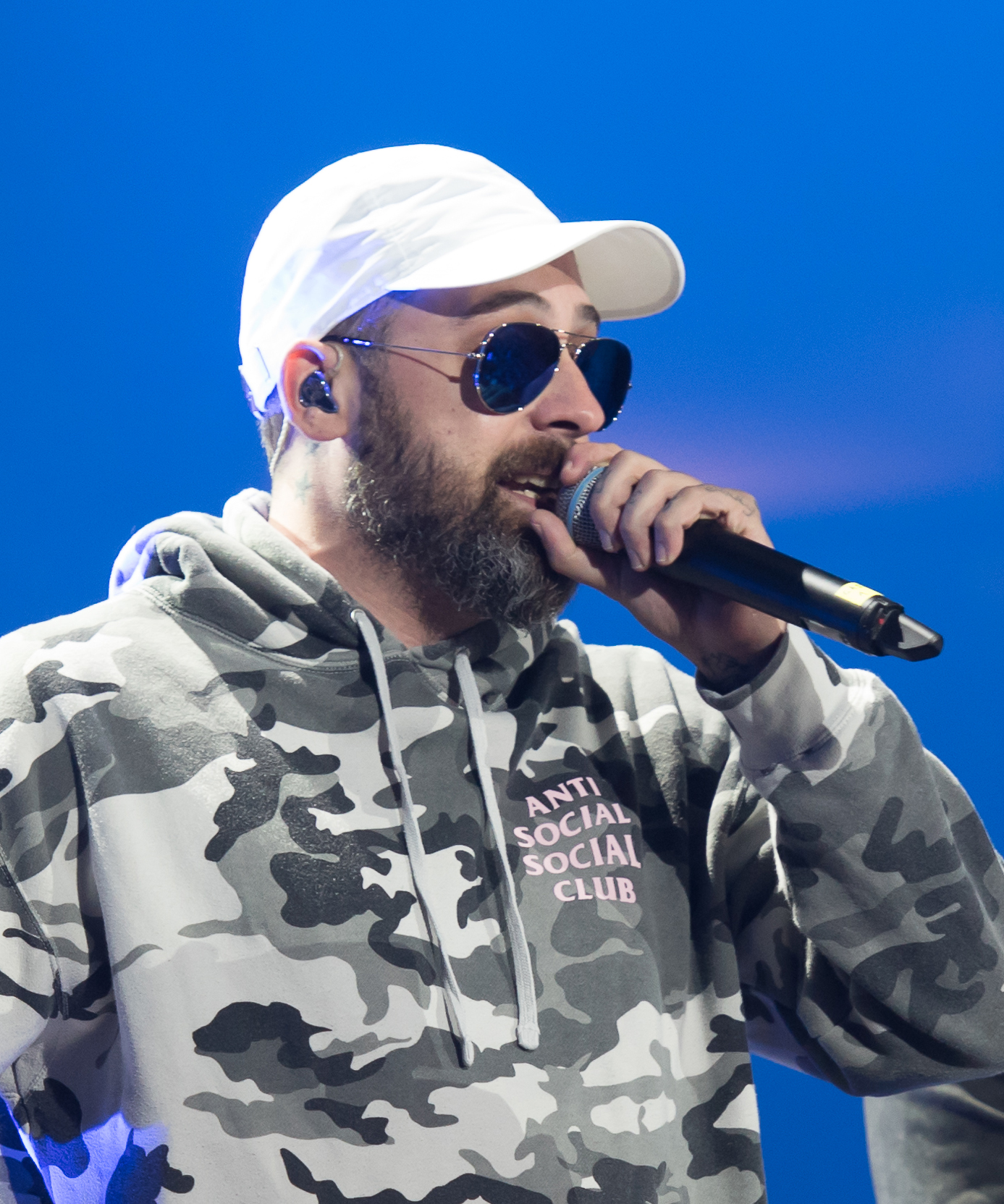
Sido

==== N–Z ====
- Xavier Naidoo (born 1971)
- Meshell Ndegeocello (born 1969), born of American parents in Germany
- Nena (born 1960)
- Nicole (born 1964), singer
- Klaus Nomi (1944–1983)
- Lisa Otto (1919–2013), opera singer
- Hedwig Reicher-Kindermann (1853–1883), opera singer
- Martin Rich (1905–2000), conductor and pianist
- Marianne Rosenberg (born 1955), singer-songwriter
- Anneliese Rothenberger (1924–2010), singer
- Ralph Siegel (born 1945), senior songwriter
- Sandra (born 1962), singer
- Kool Savas (born 1975), half German, half Turkish singer
- Gustav Schäfer, drummer of the band Tokio Hotel
- Michael Schenker (born 1955), guitar player of band UFO and solo career
- Florian Silbereisen (born 1981), singer, tv host
- Rudolf Schenker (born 1948), guitarist of the band Scorpions; brother of Michael Schenker
- Peter Schilling (born 1956), singer
- Sido (born 1980), rapper
- Cassandra Steen (born 1980), German-American singer-songwriter, and voice actress
- Farin Urlaub (born 1963), lead singer of the band Die Ärzte
- Lena Valaitis (born 1943), singer
- Paul van Dyk (born 1971), DJ, musician and record producer
- Hannes Wader (born 1943), singer-songwriter
- Claire Waldoff (1884–1957), singer
- Bruno Walter (1876–1962), conductor and composer
- Konstantin Wecker (born 1947), singer-songwriter

== Philosophy ==
Immanuel Kant

=== Classic ===
- Theodor Adorno (1903–1969), philosopher, sociologist and composer
- Albertus Magnus (c. 1193 – 1280), medieval philosopher and theologian
- Hannah Arendt (1906–1975), political theorist
- Walter Benjamin (1892–1943)
- Ernst Bloch (1885–1977)
- Jakob Böhme (1575–1624), mystic philosopher
- Franz Brentano (1838–1917), philosopher and psychologist
- Rudolf Carnap (1891–1970), philosopher
- Ernst Cassirer (1874–1945)
- Wilhelm Dilthey (1833–1911), philosopher, historian, psychologist
- Ludwig Feuerbach (1804–1872), philosopher
- Johann Gottlieb Fichte (1762–1814), philosopher
- Gottlob Frege (1848–1925), mathematician, logician and philosopher
- Eduard von Hartmann (1842–1906), philosopher
- Georg Wilhelm Friedrich Hegel (1770–1831), philosopher
- Martin Heidegger (1889–1976), philosopher
- Max Horkheimer (1895–1973)
- Edmund Husserl (1859–1938), philosopher
- Karl Jaspers (1883–1969), philosopher
- Immanuel Kant (1724–1804), philosopher
- Gottfried Leibniz (1646–1716), physicist, philosopher
- Karl Marx (1818–1883), philosopher and sociologist
- Moses Mendelssohn (1729–1786), philosopher
- Lorenz Christoph Mizler (1711–1778), philosopher active in Poland
- Nikolaus Cusanus (1401–1462), philosopher, theologian, mathematician
- Friedrich Nietzsche (1844–1900), early existentialist philosopher
- Friedrich Schelling (1775–1854), philosopher
- Moritz Schlick (1882–1936), philosopher
- Arthur Schopenhauer (1788–1860), philosopher
- Christian Wolff (1679–1754), philosopher

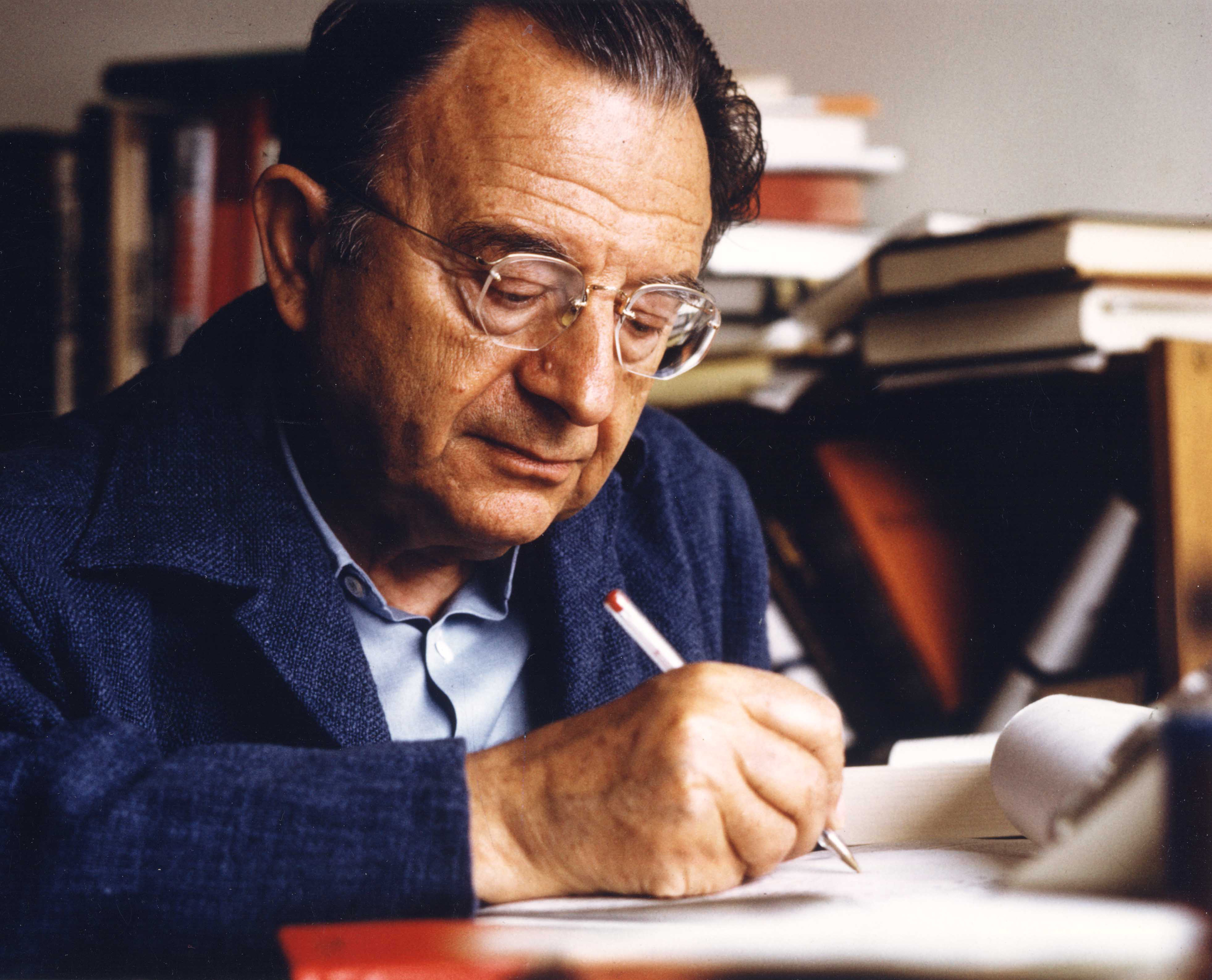
Erich Fromm

=== Major ===
- Bruno Bauer (1809–1882), political theorist and philosopher
- Friedrich Engels (1820–1895), philosopher, political economist
- Rudolf Christoph Eucken (1846–1926), philosopher
- Erich Fromm (1900–1980)
- Hans-Georg Gadamer (1900–2002), philosopher
- Wilhelm von Humboldt (1767–1835), philosopher, linguist, government functionary, diplomat; brother of Alexander von Humboldt
- Ludwig Klages (1872–1956), philosopher
- Leo Löwenthal (1900–1993)
- Karl Löwith (1897–1973)
- Herbert Marcuse (1898–1979)
- Samuel von Pufendorf (1632–1694), moral and political philosopher
- Johann Karl Friedrich Rosenkranz (1805–1879)
- Franz Rosenzweig (1886–1929)
- Max Scheler (1874–1928), philosopher
- Carl Schmitt (1888–1985), political theorist
- Georg Simmel (1859–1918), philosopher and sociologist
- Max Stirner (1806–1856), philosopher
- Carl Friedrich von Weizsäcker (1912–2007), philosopher and physicist

=== Contemporary ===
- Hans Albert (1921–2023), philosopher
- Kurt Flasch (born 1930), philosopher
- Jürgen Habermas (1929–2026), philosopher, social theorist
- Dieter Henrich (1927–2022), philosopher
- Odo Marquard (1928–2015), philosopher
- Julian Nida-Rümelin (born 1954), philosopher and political theorist
- Konrad Ott (born 1959), moral philosopher and environmentalist
- Peter Sloterdijk (born 1947), philosopher and television host
- Robert Spaemann (1927–2018), philosopher
- Oswald Spengler (1880–1936), philosopher of history; best known for his book "The Decline of the West" (Der Untergang des Abendlandes)
- Ernst Tugendhat (1930–2023), philosopher

== Politicians ==
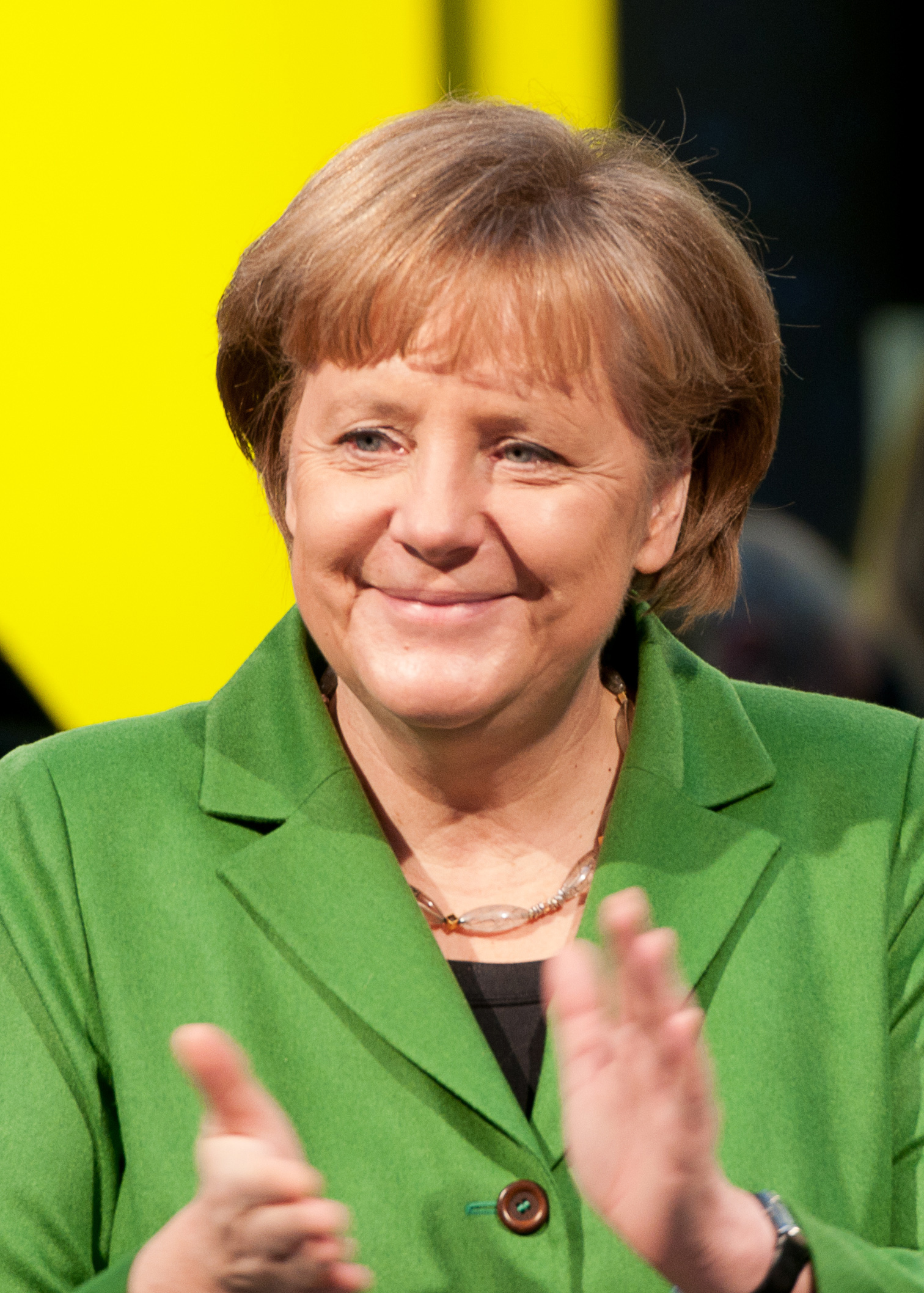
Angela Merkel

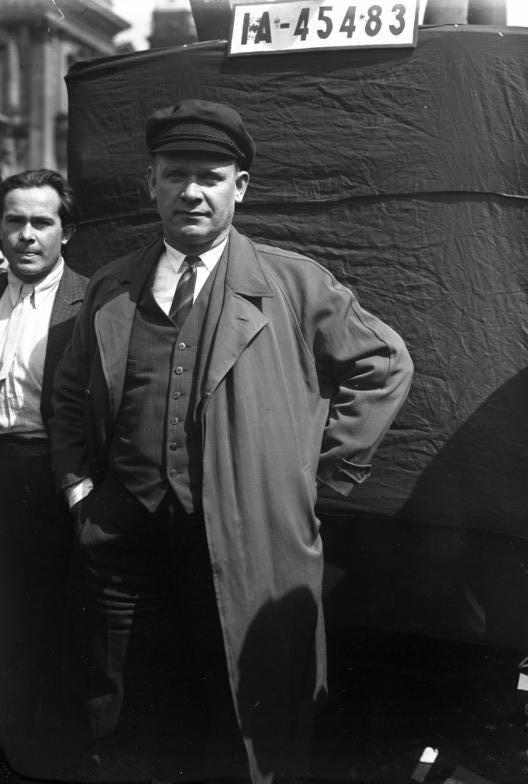
Ernst Thälmann

=== Miscellaneous ===
- Rainer Barzel (1924–2006), leader of the party Christian Democratic Union of Germany (CDU)
- August Bebel (1840–1913), co-founder of the Social Democratic Party of Germany
- Rudolf von Bennigsen (1824–1902), founder of the National Liberal Party
- Eduard Bernstein (1850–1932), Social Democratic leader
- Heinrich von Brentano (1904–1964), Foreign Minister Christian Democratic Union of Germany (CDU)
- Julius Curtius (1877–1948), Foreign Minister (German People's Party)
- Matthias Erzberger (1875–1921), Catholic Center party leader
- Joschka Fischer (born 1948), Foreign Minister and vice chancellor 1998–2005 (Bündnis 90/Die Grünen)
- Heinrich Karl Fricke (1884–1945), diplomat, businessperson, and spy
- Hans-Dietrich Genscher (1927–2016), former minister for foreign affairs (FDP)
- Jakob Grimm (1785–1863), parliamentarian
- Wilhelm Grimm (1786–1859), parliamentarian
- Gregor Gysi (born 1948), former leader of the Party of Democratic Socialism
- Georg Hornstein (1900–1942), resistance fighter during the period of National Socialism (Nazism)
- Alfred Hugenberg (1865–1951), leader of the German National People's Party
- Johann Jacoby (1805–1877), radical democrat in Prussia
- Luise Kähler (1869–1955), trade union leader, founding member of Socialist Unity Party of Germany (SED)
- Karl Kautsky (1854–1938), Social Democratic leader and theoretician
- Petra Kelly (1947–1992), co-founder of the German Green Party
- Roland Koch (born 1958), Minister-President of Hesse
- Oskar Lafontaine (born 1943), socialist, former minister for finance
- Ferdinand Lassalle (1825–1864), democrat and socialist
- Karl Liebknecht (1871–1919), socialist
- Wilhelm Liebknecht (1826–1900), co-founder of the Social Democratic Party of Germany (SPD)
- Rosa Luxemburg (1870–1919), left-wing Social Democratic leader
- Gudrun Masloch (born 1969), German ambassador to Latvia
- Jakob Maria Mierscheid (born 1933), virtual parliamentarian (SPD)
- Hans Modrow (1928–2023), former leader of GDR, honorary chairman of PDS
- Hermann Müller (1876–1931), Chancellor of the Weimar Republic (SPD)
- Erich Ollenhauer (1901–1963), leader of the Social Democratic Party of Germany (SPD)
- Antonie "Toni" Pfülf (1877–1933), female socialist (SPD)
- Walther Rathenau (1867–1922), foreign minister (DDP)
- Eugen Richter (1838–1906), liberal politician
- Wolfgang Schäuble (1942–2023), Christian politician, financial minister (CDU)
- Carlo Schmid (1896–1979), politician who had vast influence on the content of the German Basic Law after World War II
- Gerhard Schröder (1910–1989), foreign minister, minister of the Interior (CDU)
- Kurt Schumacher (1895–1952), leader of the Social Democratic Party of Germany in the early years of the FRG
- Baron Heinrich vom Stein (1757–1831)
- Edmund Stoiber (born 1941), party leader of the CSU and former minister president of Bavaria
- Franz Josef Strauss (1915–1988), Bavarian politician (CSU)
- Ernst Thälmann (1886–1944), leader of the Communist Party of Germany during the Weimar period
- Hans-Jochen Vogel (1926–2020), leader of the Social Democratic Party of Germany (SPD), federal minister of justice
- Otto Wels (1873–1939), leader of the Social Democratic Party of Germany (SPD)
- Guido Westerwelle (1961–2016), party leader of the liberal party (FDP)
- Klaus Wowereit (born 1953), social democrat politician (SPD)
- Clara Zetkin (1857–1933), socialist and fighter for women's rights
- Silke Grimm (born 1967), German politician

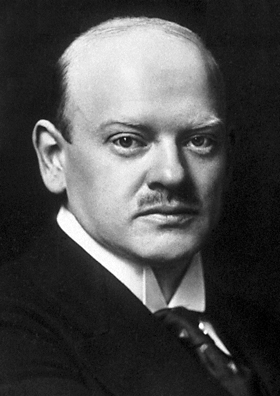
Gustav Stresemann

=== Chancellors of Germany 1871–1945 ===
- Gustav Bauer (1870–1944), chancellor of the Weimar Republic (SPD)
- Theobald von Bethmann Hollweg (1856–1921), Imperial Chancellor
- Otto von Bismarck (1815–1898), Imperial Chancellor
- Heinrich Brüning (1885–1970), Chancellor of the Weimar Republic (Centre Party)
- Bernhard von Bülow (1849–1929), Imperial Chancellor
- Leo von Caprivi (1831–1899), Imperial Chancellor
- Wilhelm Cuno (1876–1933), Chancellor of the Weimar Republic
- Constantin Fehrenbach (1852–1926), Chancellor of the Weimar Republic (Centre)
- Georg von Hertling (1843–1919), Imperial Chancellor
- Adolf Hitler (1889–1945), Leader of Nazi Germany, combining legally the offices of President and Chancellor ("Führer und Reichskanzler") (1933–1945)

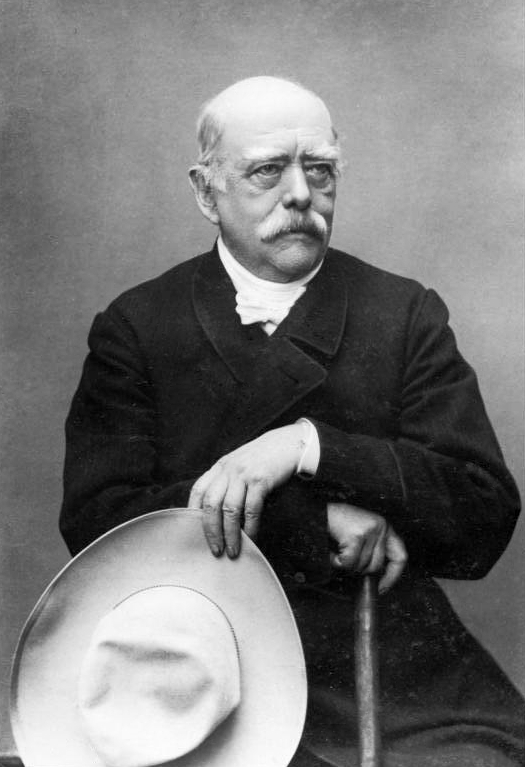
Photo of Chancellor Bismarck in the 1880s

- Prince Chlodwig zu Hohenlohe-Schillingsfürst (1819–1901), Imperial Chancellor
- Hans Luther (1885–1962), Chancellor of the Weimar Republic
- Wilhelm Marx (1863–1946), Chancellor of the Weimar Republic (Centre)
- Prince Maximilian of Baden (1867–1929), Last Imperial Chancellor
- Georg Michaelis (1857–1936), Imperial Chancellor
- Franz von Papen (1879–1969), Chancellor of the Weimar Republic
- Philipp Scheidemann (1865–1939), Chancellor of Weimar Republic (SPD)
- Kurt von Schleicher (1882–1934), last Chancellor of the Weimar Republic
- Gustav Stresemann (1878–1929), Chancellor of the Weimar Republic (DVP)
- Joseph Wirth (1879–1956), Chancellor of the Weimar Republic (Centre)

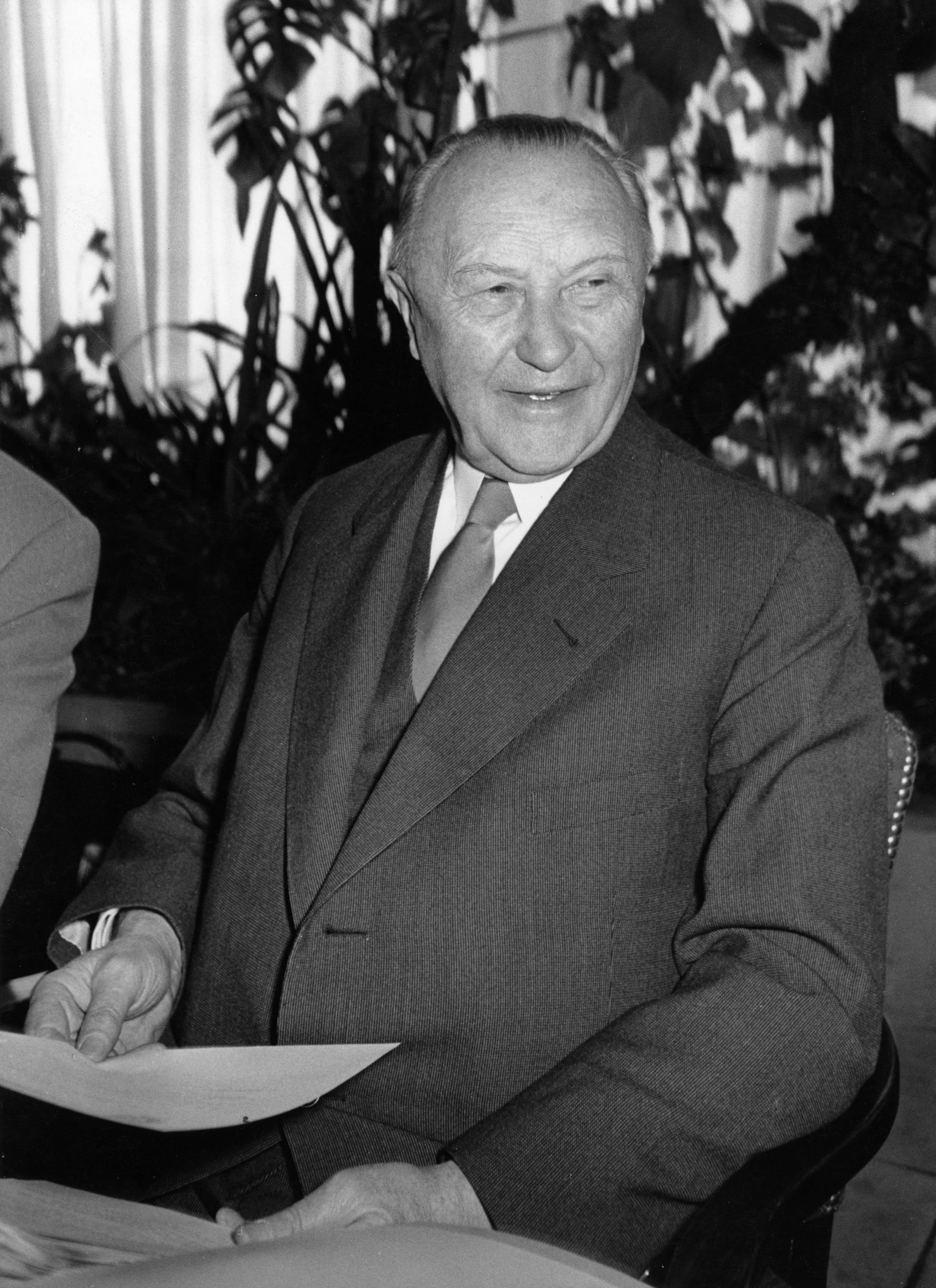
Konrad Adenauer

=== Chancellors of Germany (after World War II) ===
(in chronological order)

- Konrad Adenauer (1876–1967), first democratically elected Federal Chancellor in Western Germany (after World War II) from 1949 to 1963 (Christian-Democratic Union, CDU)
- Ludwig Erhard (1897–1977), Federal Chancellor from 1963 to 1966 (CDU)
- Kurt Georg Kiesinger (1904–1988), Federal Chancellor from 1966 to 1969 (CDU)
- Willy Brandt (1913–1992), Federal Chancellor from 1969 to 1974 (Social Democratic Party, SPD)
- Helmut Schmidt (1918–2015), Federal Chancellor from 1974 to 1982 (SPD)
- Helmut Kohl (1930–2017), Federal Chancellor from 1982 to 1998 (CDU)
- Gerhard Schröder (born 1944), Federal Chancellor from 1998 to 2005 (SPD)
- Angela Merkel (born 1954), Federal Chancellor from 2005 to 2021 (CDU)
- Olaf Scholz (born 1958), Federal Chancellor from 2021 to 2025 (SPD)
- Friedrich Merz (born 1955), Federal Chancellor since 2025 (CDU)

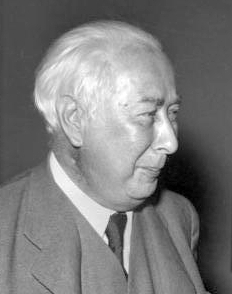
Theodor Heuss

=== Presidents of Germany ===
(in chronological order)

- Friedrich Ebert (1871–1925), first president of the Weimar Republic (SPD) 1919–25
- Paul von Hindenburg (1847–1934), field marshal, president 1925–34
- Adolf Hitler (1889–1945), combining legally both offices, president and chancellor ("Führer und Reichskanzler") 1933–45
- Karl Dönitz (1891–1980), Admiral of the Fleet, after Hitler's death, president for 22 days, 1945

Presidents of the Federal Republic of Germany since 1949:
(in chronological order)

- Theodor Heuss (1884–1963), Federal President 1949–59 (Liberal-Democratic Party, FDP)
- Heinrich Lübke (1894–1972), Federal President 1959–69 (CDU)
- Gustav Heinemann (1899–1976), Federal President 1969–74 (SPD)
- Walter Scheel (1919–2016), Federal President 1974–79 (FDP)
- Karl Carstens (1914–1992), Federal President 1979–84 (CDU)
- Richard von Weizsäcker (1920–2015), Federal President 1984–94 (CDU)
- Roman Herzog (1934–2017), Federal President 1994–99 (CDU)
- Johannes Rau (1931–2006), Federal President 1999–2004 (SPD)
- Horst Köhler (1943–2025), Federal President 2004–10 (CDU)
- Jens Böhrnsen (born 1949), acting president since resignation of Köhler in 2010 (SPD)
- Christian Wulff (born 1959), Federal President 2010–12 (CDU)
- Horst Seehofer (born 1949), acting president since resignation of Wulff in 2012 (CDU)
- Joachim Gauck (born 1940), Federal President 2012–2017 (Independent)
- Frank-Walter Steinmeier (born 1956) Federal President since 19 March 2017 (SPD)

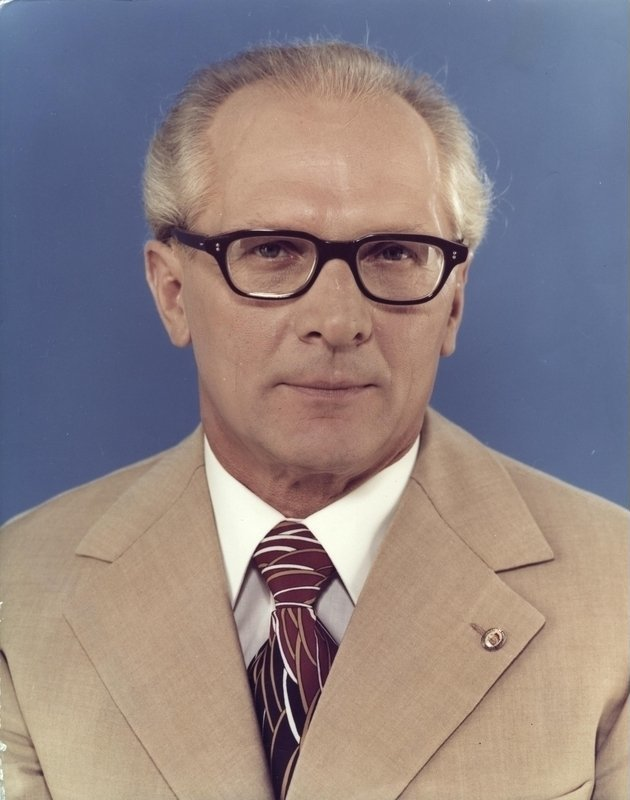
Erich Honecker

=== Politicians of the East German Communist Party and regime ===
- Otto Grotewohl (1894–1964), minister president of the GDR
- Erich Honecker (1912–1994), leader of the GDR until 1989
- Egon Krenz (born 1937), leader of the GDR after Honecker
- Erich Mielke (1907–2000), head of the Stasi
- Wilhelm Pieck (1876–1960), first president of the GDR
- Heinrich Rau (1899–1961), chairman of the German Economic Commission (predecessor of the East German government)
- Günter Schabowski (1929–2015), member of politburo
- Willy Stoph (1914–1999), premier of the GDR
- Walter Ulbricht (1893–1973), leader of the GDR

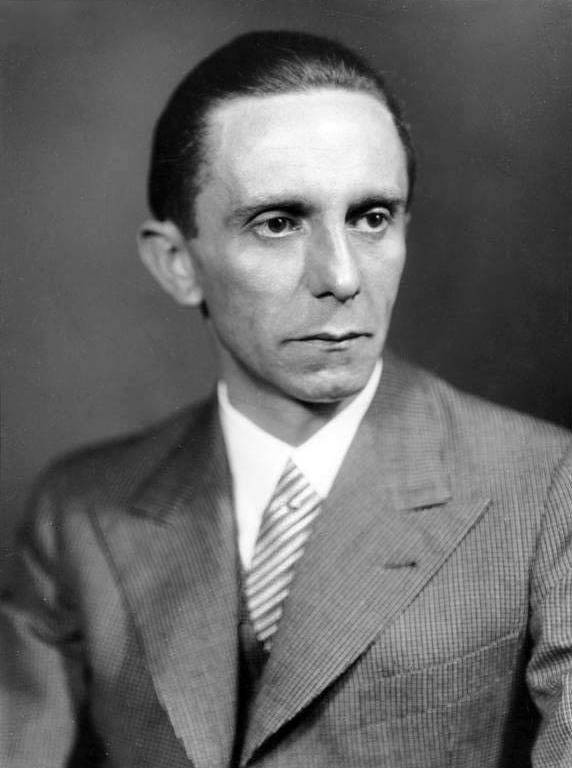
Joseph Goebbels

=== Personalities of the Nazi Party and regime ===
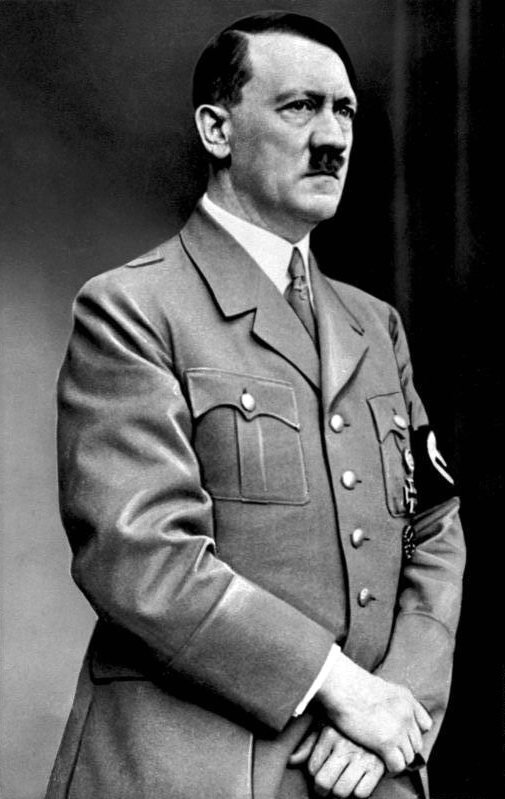
Adolf Hitler

- Artur Axmann (1913–1996), Hitler Youth leader (1940–1945)
- Klaus Barbie (1913–1991), the "Butcher of Lyon"
- Fedor von Bock (1880–1945), field marshal
- Martin Bormann (1900–1945), Nazi leader
- Eva Braun (1912–1945), Hitler's mistress and finally his wife
- Wilhelm Canaris (1887–1945), admiral and chief of the Abwehr
- Karl Dönitz (1891–1980), Admiral of the Fleet, briefly Hitler's successor as President
- Anton Drexler (1884–1942), founder of German Workers' Party, which became the NSDAP
- Adolf Eichmann (1906–1962), Nazi SS-Obersturmbannführer (lieutenant colonel)
- Hans Frank (1900–1946), Governor-General of Poland
- Roland Freisler (1893–1945), Nazi judge
- Wilhelm Frick (1877–1946), Minister of the Interior
- Walther Funk (1890–1960), Minister of Economics
- Joseph Goebbels (1897–1945), Chancellor of Germany, propaganda chief for the Nazis
- Hermann Göring (1893–1946), Nazi, Reich Marshal and chief of Luftwaffe
- Rudolf Hess (1894–1987), Hitler's private secretary, later Deputy Führer
- Reinhard Heydrich (1904–1942), Nazi officer, head of the Sicherheitsdienst and RSHA
- Heinrich Himmler (1900–1945), Nazi head of the SS
- Rudolf Höss (1901–1947), commandant of Auschwitz
- Ernst Kaltenbrunner (1903–1946), Heydrich's successor at the RSHA
- Hans Kammler (1901 – c. 1945), author and organiser of first Death Camps
- Wilhelm Keitel (1882–1946), field marshal, head of the OKW (1939–1945)
- Karl-Otto Koch (1897–1945), German first commandant of the Buchenwald concentration camp
- Robert Ley (1890–1945), head of the German Labour Front
- Erich von Manstein (1885–1973), field marshal and commander of the Eleventh Army (1941–1942), Army Group Don (1942–43), and Army Group South (1943–1944)
- Josef Mengele (1911–1979), German SS officer and a physician in the Nazi concentration camp Auschwitz
- Erhard Milch (1892–1972), Göring's second-in-command, Air Inspector General
- Walter Model (1891–1945), field marshal
- Heinrich Müller (1900–1945?), head of the Gestapo (1939–1945)
- Konstantin von Neurath (1873–1956), Foreign Minister in the early years of the regime
- Franz von Papen (1879–1969), Deputy Chancellor in Hitler's first cabinet
- Erich Raeder (1876–1960), Admiral of the Fleet
- Joachim von Ribbentrop (1893–1946), Nazi foreign minister
- Ernst Röhm (1887–1934), first Stabschef of the SA
- Erwin Rommel (1891–1944), Commander of the 7th Panzer Division and the Afrika Korps
- Alfred Rosenberg (1893–1946), Nazi ideologist
- Gerd von Rundstedt (1875–1953), field marshal, Commander-in-Chief East (1939–40), commander of Army Group South (1939–1941), Commander-in-Chief West (1942–1945)
- Hjalmar Schacht, Minister of Finance
- Baldur von Schirach (1907–1974), first Hitler Youth leader
- Albert Speer (1905–1981), "Hitler's architect", Minister of Armaments
- Gregor Strasser (1892–1934), left-wing Nazi leader
- Julius Streicher (1885–1946), Nazi Party leader in Franconia

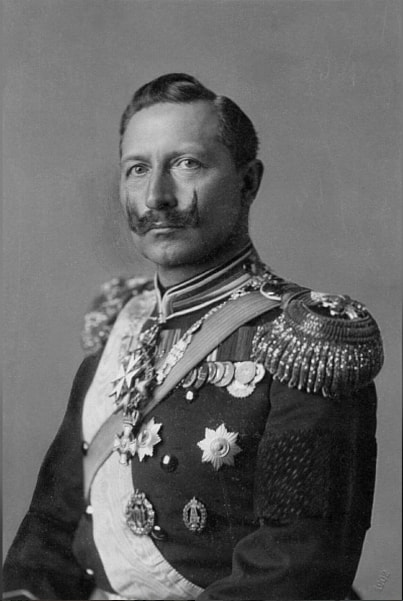
Wilhelm II

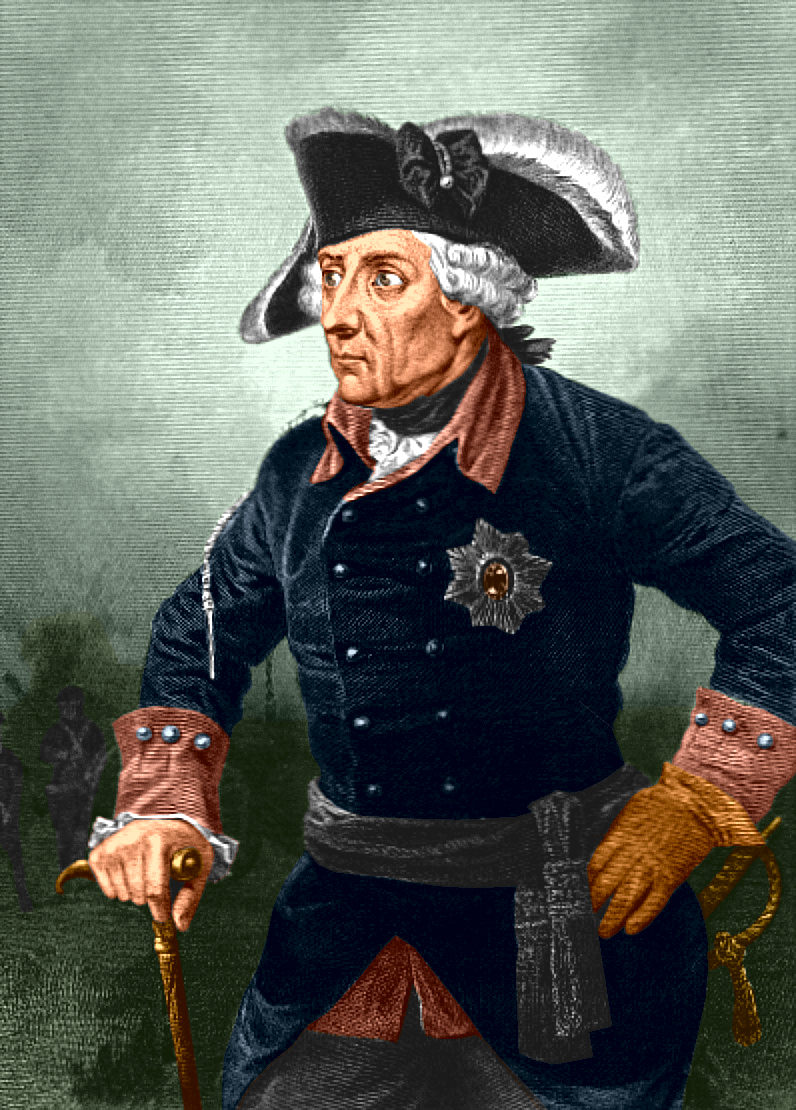
Frederick the Great

== Royalty ==
- Prince Albert of Saxe-Coburg and Gotha (1819–1861), Queen Victoria's husband and consort
- Albert, King of Saxony (1828–1902, reigned 1873-1902)
- Alexandra Feodorovna (Alix of Hesse) (1872–1918), German princess by birth before marrying Tsar Nicholas II to become a Russian tsarina
- Anne of Cleves (1515–1557), Queen of England from 6 January to 9 July 1540 as the fourth wife of King Henry VIII
- Anton (1755–1836), King of Saxony (1827–1836)
- Carol I of Hohenzollern-Sigmaringen (1839–1914), Prince (1867–1881) and King (1881–1914) of Romania
- Catherine the Great (1729–1796), Empress of Russia
- Charles IV (1316–1378), King of Germany 1346, Holy Roman Emperor 1355–78
- Charles V (1500–1558), King of Spain 1516, King of Germany 1519, Holy Roman Emperor 1530–56
- Charles (1823–1891), King of Württemberg (1823–1891)
- Claus von Amsberg (1926–2002), diplomat and husband of Queen Beatrix of the Netherlands
- Ferdinand of Hohenzollern-Sigmaringen (1865–1927), King of Romania (1924–1927)
- Ferdinand of Saxe-Coburg-Gotha (1861–1948), Prince of Bulgaria (1887–1908), King (or Tsar) of the Bulgarians (1908–1918)
- Frederick Barbarossa (1122–1190), King of Germany 1152, Holy Roman Emperor 1155–90
- Frederick I of Prussia (1657–1713), Elector of Brandenburg (1688–1713), King in Prussia (1701–1713)
- Frederick I of Württemberg (1754–1816), Duke (1797–1803), Elector (1803–1806), and King (1806–1816) of Württemberg
- Frederick II, Holy Roman Emperor (1194–1250), Holy Roman Emperor and King of Jerusalem
- Frederick the Great (Frederick II of Prussia, 1712–1786), King of Prussia (1740–1786)
- Frederick III, German Emperor and King of Prussia (1831–1888, reigned 9 March - 15 June 1888)
- Augustus II the Strong (1670–1733), Elector of Saxony (1694), King of Poland (1697–1733)
- Frederick Augustus I (1750–1827), Elector (1763–1806) and King (1806–1827) of Saxony
- Frederick Augustus II (1797–1854), King of Saxony (1836–1854)
- Frederick Augustus III (1865–1932), King of Saxony (1904–1918)
- Frederick William I (1688–1740), King of Prussia (1713–1740)
- Frederick William II (1744–1797), King of Prussia (1786–1797)
- Frederick William III (1770–1840), King of Prussia (1797–1840)
- Frederick William IV (1795–1861), King of Prussia (1840–1861)
- George (1832–1904), King of Saxony (1902–1904)
- George V (1819–1878), King of Hanover (1851–1866)
- Henry I the Fowler (876–936), King of Germany 919
- Henry II (972–1024), King of Germany 1002, Holy Roman Emperor 1014–24
- Henry III (1017–1056), King of Germany 1039, Holy Roman Emperor 1046–56
- Henry IV (1050–1106), King of Germany 1056, Holy Roman Emperor 1084–1106
- Henry V (1081–1125), King of Germany 1106, Holy Roman Emperor 1111–25
- Henry VI (1165–1197), King of Germany 1190, Holy Roman Emperor 1191–97
- John (1801–1873), King of Saxony (1854–1873)
- Louis IV (1281–1347), King of Germany 1314, Holy Roman Emperor 1328–47
- Ludwig I (1786–1868), King of Bavaria (1825–1848)
- Ludwig II (1845–1886), King of Bavaria (1864–1886)
- Ludwig III (1845–1921), King of Bavaria (1913–1918)
- Maximilian I (1459–1519), King of Germany 1486, Holy Roman Emperor 1508–19
- Maximilian I (1756–1825), Elector (1799–1805) and King (1805–1825) of Bavaria
- Maximilian II (1811–1864), King of Bavaria (1848–1864)
- Otto I the Great (912–973), King of Germany 936, Holy Roman Emperor 962–973
- Otto II (955–983), Holy Roman Emperor 973–983
- Otto III (980–1002), King of Germany 983, Holy Roman Emperor 996–1002
- Otto of Greece King of Bavaria (1815–1867), King of the Hellenes (1833–1862)
- Otto of Bavaria (1848–1916), King of Bavaria (1886–1913)
- Wilhelm I (1797–1888), German Emperor (1871–1888) and King of Prussia (1861–1888)
- Wilhelm II (1859–1941), German Emperor and King of Prussia (1888–1918)
- William I (1781–1864), King of Württemberg (1816–1864)
- William II (1848–1921), King of Württemberg (1891–1918)

== Scientists and engineers ==
=== A–G ===
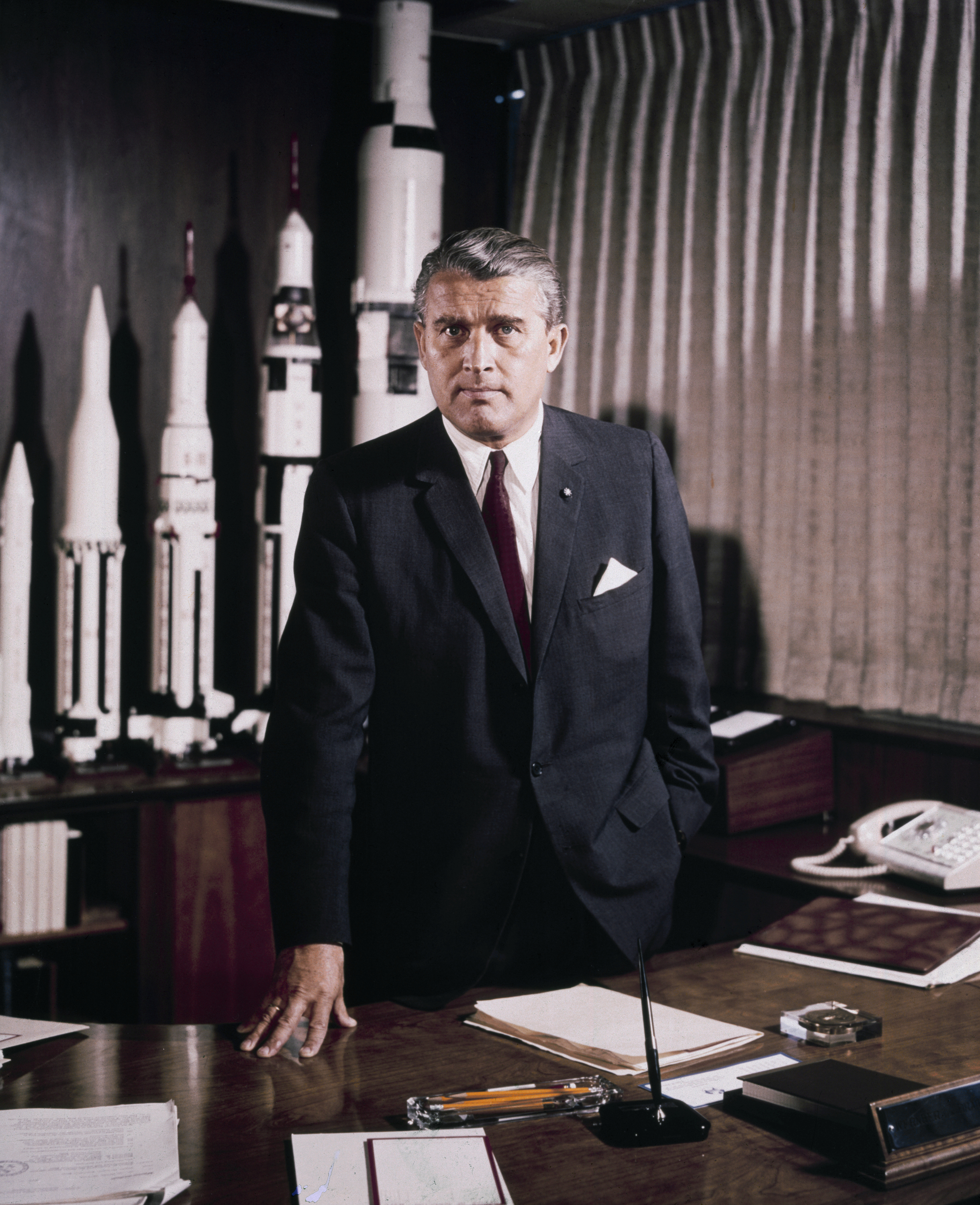
Wernher von Braun

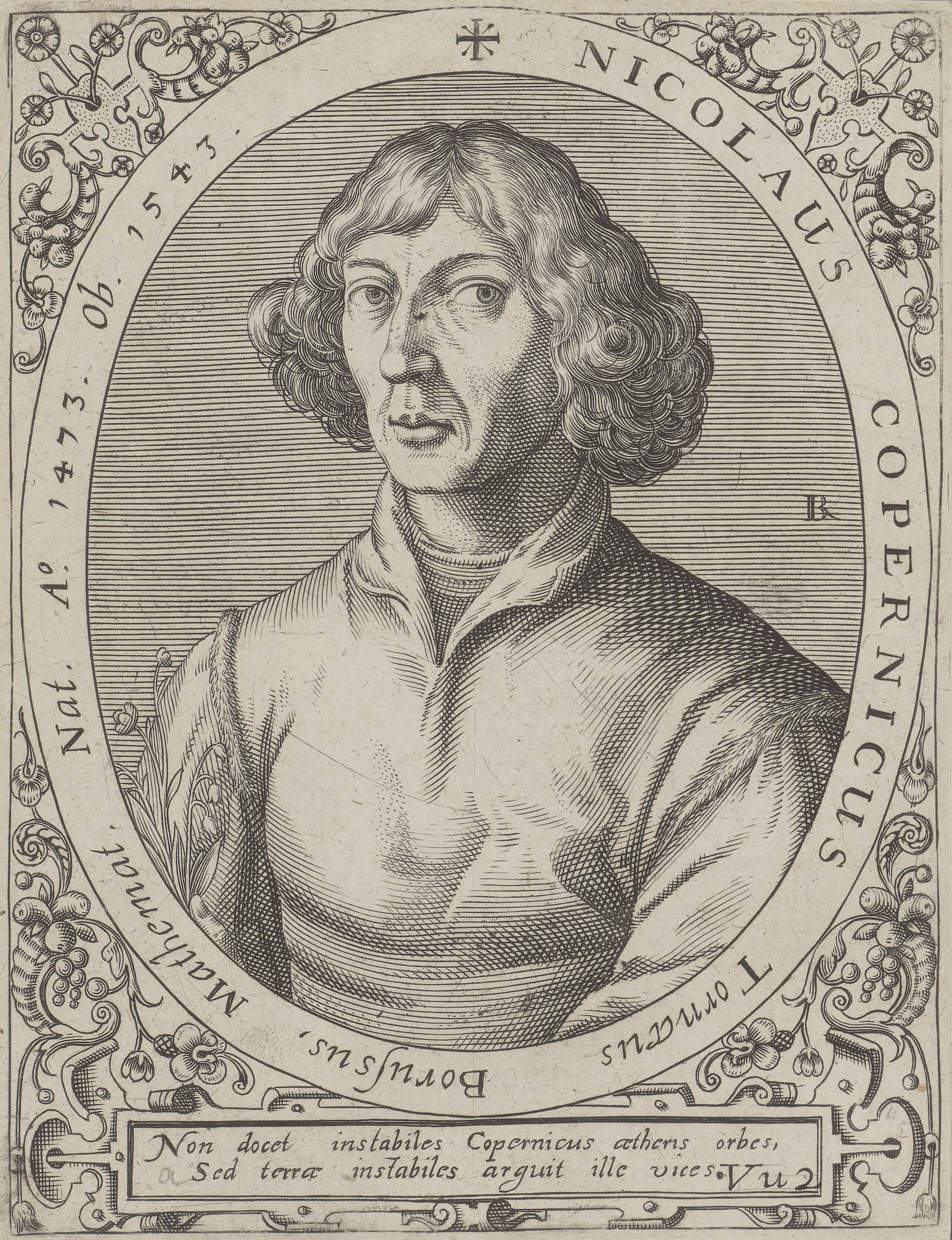
Nicolaus Copernicus, Tornaeus Borussus Mathematicus (N.C., Prussian mathematician from Thorn/Torun). Copper engraving from 1597

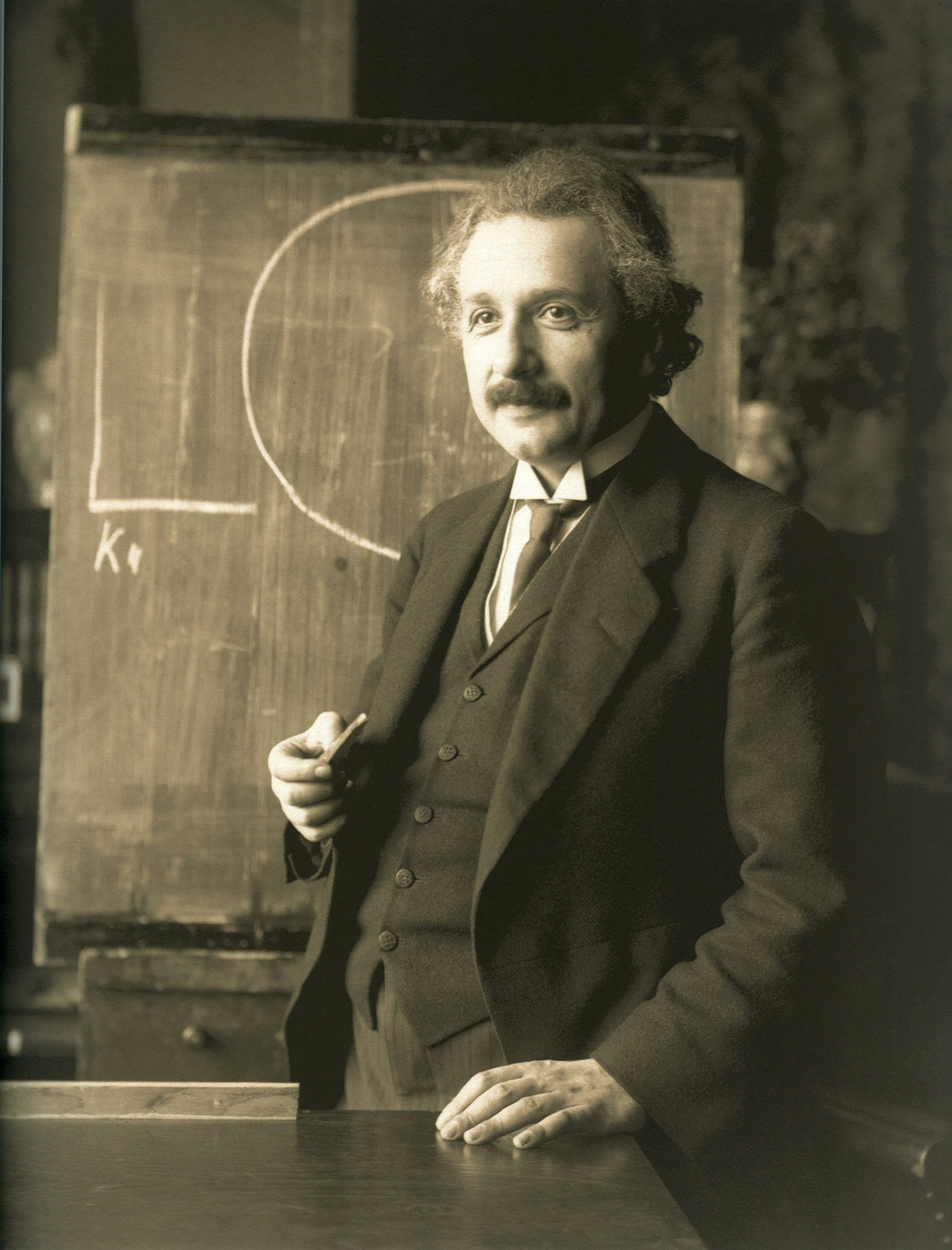
Albert Einstein

- Otto Wilhelm Hermann von Abich (1806–1886), mineralogist, geologist
- Michael Albeck (born 1934), Israeli chemist; President of Bar-Ilan University
- Alois Alzheimer (1864–1915), psychiatrist and neuropathologist
- Peter Apian (1495–1552), mathematician, astronomer and cartographer
- Manfred von Ardenne (1907–1997), physicist
- Lykke Aresin (1921–2011), physician, sexologist and writer
- Anton de Bary (1831–1888), surgeon, botanist, microbiologist
- Johann Bayer (1572–1625), astronomer
- Henning Behrens (born 1940), economist and political scientist
- Georg Bednorz (born 1950), physicist Nobel Prize for Physics
- Emil von Behring (1854–1917), physician
- Karl Benz (1844–1929), inventor of the gasoline-powered automobile
- Friedrich Bessel (1784–1846), mathematician
- Hans Bethe (1906–2005), physicist
- Hennig Brand (c. 1630 – c.1692 or c. 1710), alchemist; discoverer of phosphorus
- Max Born (1882–1970), physicist
- Robert Bosch (1861–1942), industrialist
- Carl F. W. Borgward (1890–1963), engineer
- Karl Ferdinand Braun (1850–1918), physicist
- Wernher von Braun (1912–1977), space engineer, rocket scientist
- Eduard Buchner (1860–1917), biochemist; recipient 1907 Nobel Prize for Chemistry for the discovery of enzymes
- Robert Wilhelm Bunsen (1811–1899), chemist
- Alfred Buntru (1887–1974), hydraulic engineer and SS officer
- Georg Cantor (1845–1918), mathematician
- Conrad of Leonberg (1460–1511), humanist scholar
- Nicolaus Copernicus (1473–1543), Prussian astronomer who wrote and spoke German; he is also often considered as a Pole
- Hans Gerhard Creutzfeldt, neuropathologist
- Adolf Daimler (1871–1913), mechanical engineer
- Gottlieb Daimler (1834–1900), inventor and engineer
- Gertrud Dorka (1893–1976), archaeologist, prehistorian and museum director
- Carl Duisberg (1861–1935), chemist and industrialist
- Rudolf Diesel (1858–1913), inventor of the Diesel engine
- Paul Ehrlich (1854–1915), physician
- Albert Einstein (1879–1955), physicist
- Gerhard Ertl (born 1936), physicist
- Hans Jürgen Eysenck (1916–1997), psychologist
- Daniel Gabriel Fahrenheit (1686–1736), physicist, engineer, and glass blower
- Adolf Eugen Fick (1829–1901), inventor of contact lenses
- Wolfgang Finkelnburg (1905–1967), physicist
- Hermann Emil Fischer (1852–1919), chemist and 1902 recipient of the Nobel Prize in Chemistry
- Friederike Fless (born 1964), president of the German Archaeological Institute
- Elvira Fölzer (1868–1928), early female archaeologist
- Joseph von Fraunhofer (1787–1826), physicist
- Gottlob Frege (1848–1925), mathematician and logicist
- Wilhelm Siegmund Frei (1885–1943), dermatologist
- Erich Fromm (1900–1980), psychologist
- Klaus Fuchs (1911–1988), physicist and spy
- Hans Geiger (1882–1945), physicist
- Carl Friedrich Gauss (1777–1855), mathematician
- Otto von Guericke (1602–1682), scientist
- Johannes Gutenberg (1398–1468), inventor of modern bookprinting

=== H–J ===
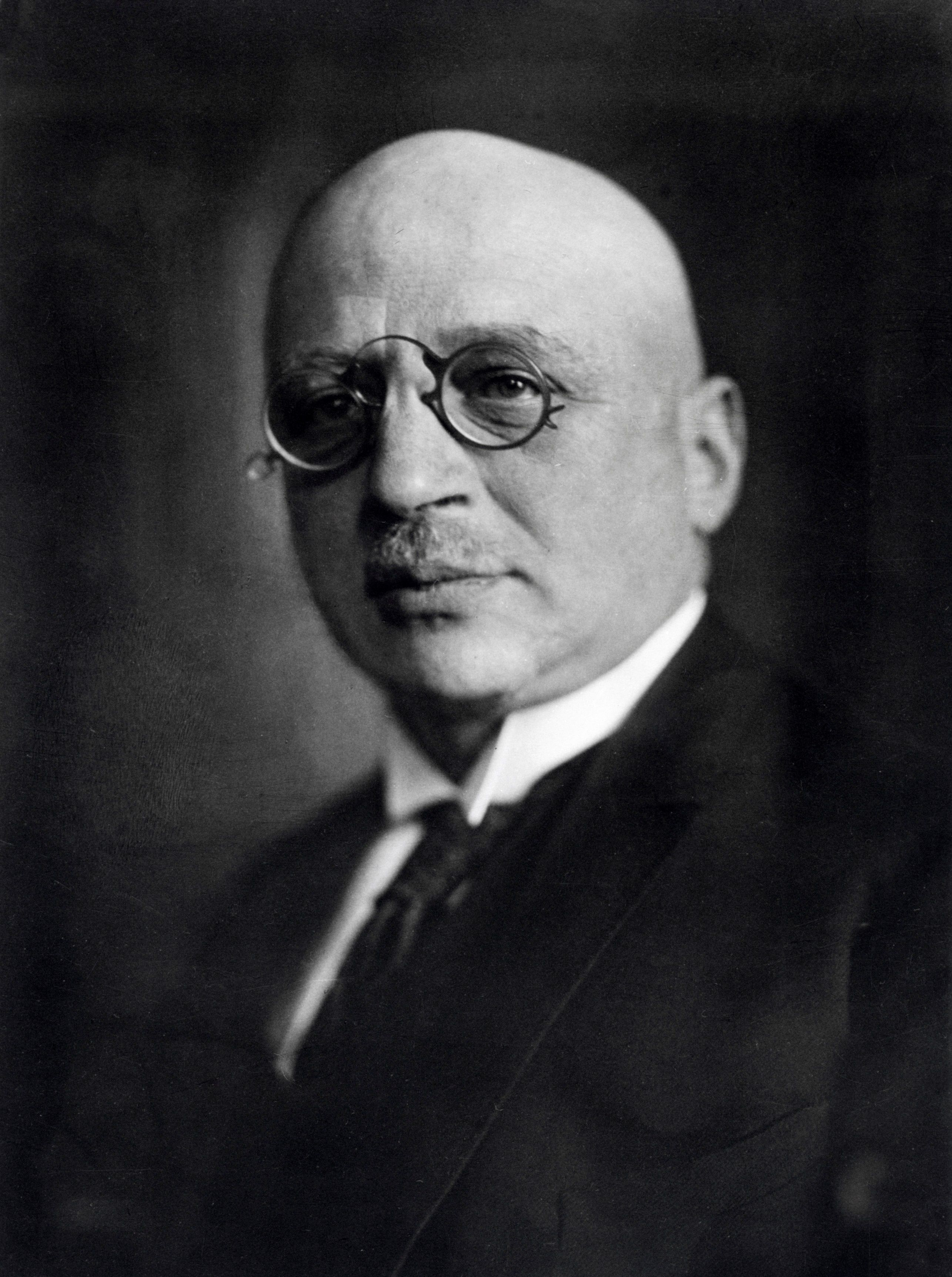
Fritz Haber

- Fritz Haber (1868–1934), chemist
- Ernst Haeckel (1834–1919), physician
- Otto Hahn (1879–1968), chemist
- Theodor W. Hänsch (born 1941), physicist
- Bernhard Hantzsch (1875–1911), ornithologist
- Georg Hartmann (1865–1946), geographer
- Felix Hausdorff (1868–1942), mathematician
- Robert Havemann (1910–1982), chemist
- Ernst Heinkel (1888–1958), aircraft engineer
- Werner Karl Heisenberg (1901–1976), physicist
- Hermann Helmholtz (1821–1894), physicist
- Heinrich Rudolf Hertz (1857–1894), physicist
- Johannes Hevelius (1611–1687), astronomer
- David Hilbert (1862–1943), mathematician
- Magnus Hirschfeld (1868–1935), physician, sexologist, founder of the first ever committee for LGBTQ+ rights
- Johann Homann (1664–1724), geographer
- Erich Hueckel (1896–1980), physicist
- Alexander von Humboldt (1769–1859), explorer
- Carl Gustav Jacob Jacobi (1804–1851), mathematician
- Alfons Maria Jakob (1884–1931), neurologist
- Hugo Junkers (1859–1935), aircraft engineer

=== K–L ===
- Theodor Kaluza (1885–1954), mathematician, theoretical physicist
- Friedrich August Kekulé von Stradonitz (1829–1896), chemist
- Johannes Kepler (1571–1630), astronomer
- Gustav Robert Kirchhoff (1824–1887), physicist
- Martin Heinrich Klaproth (1743–1817), chemist
- Felix Klein (1849–1925), mathematician
- Klaus von Klitzing (born 1943), physicist, Nobel Prize in Physics
- Wolfgang Franz von Kobell (1803–1882), mineralogist
- Robert Koch (1843–1910), physician
- Walter Karl Koch (1880–1962), surgeon
- Adolph Wilhelm Hermann Kolbe (1818–1884), chemist
- Leopold Kronecker (1823–1891), mathematician
- Ernst Eduard Kummer (1810–1893), mathematician
- Edmund Landau (1877–1938), mathematician
- Hermann Lattemann (1852–1894), balloon pilot and parachutist
- Max von Laue (1879–1960), physicist
- Gottfried Wilhelm Leibniz (1646–1716), mathematician
- Philipp Eduard Anton von Lenard (1862–1947), physicist
- Rudolph Lennhoff (1866–1933), public health doctor
- August Leskien (1840–1916), linguist
- Justus von Liebig (1803–1873), chemist
- Otto Lilienthal (1848–1896), aviation pioneer
- Ferdinand von Lindemann (1852–1939), mathematician
- Alexander Lippisch (1894–1976), aerodynamicist
- Friedrich Loeffler (1852–1915), bacteriologist
- Johann Josef Loschmidt (1821–1895), physicist, chemist
- Cornelia Lüdecke (born 1954), polar researcher, historian
- Reimar Lüst (1923–2020), astrophysicist

=== M–R ===
- (Albertus Magnus see "A")
- Ludwig Immanuel Magnus, mathematician
- Siegfried Marcus (1831–1898), automobile pioneer
- Wilhelm Maybach (1846–1929), car-engine and automobile constructor
- Wilhelm Messerschmitt (1898–1978), aircraft engineer
- Lothar Meyer (1830–1895), chemist
- Franz Mertens (1840–1927), mathematician
- August Ferdinand Möbius (1790–1868), mathematician, theoretical astronomer
- Lydia Möcklinghoff (1981–2026), zoologist
- Ralph Bernstein (born 1933), engineer
- Johannes Müller (1801–1858), physiologist
- Walther Nernst (1864–1941), physicist
- Carl Gottfried Neumann (1832–1925), mathematician
- Franz Ernst Neumann (1798–1895), mathematician
- Markolf Niemz (born 1964), physicist, biophysicist, and author
- Claus Noé (1938–2008), economist
- Emmy Noether (1882–1935), mathematician
- Georg Ohm (1789–1854), physicist
- Wilhelm Ostwald, chemist; recipient 1909 Nobel Prize in Chemistry
- Nicolaus Otto (1832–1891), coinventor of the Otto cycle
- Bernhard Philberth (1927–2010), physicist, engineer, philosopher, theologian
- Lily Pincus (1898–1981), social worker, marital psychotherapist and author
- Max Planck (1858–1947), physicist
- Jesco von Puttkamer (1933–2012), space scientist (NASA manager), engineer and author
- Bernhard Riemann (1826–1866), mathematician
- Adam Ries (1492–1559), mathematician
- Wilhelm Röntgen (1845–1923), physicist; inventor of x-rays

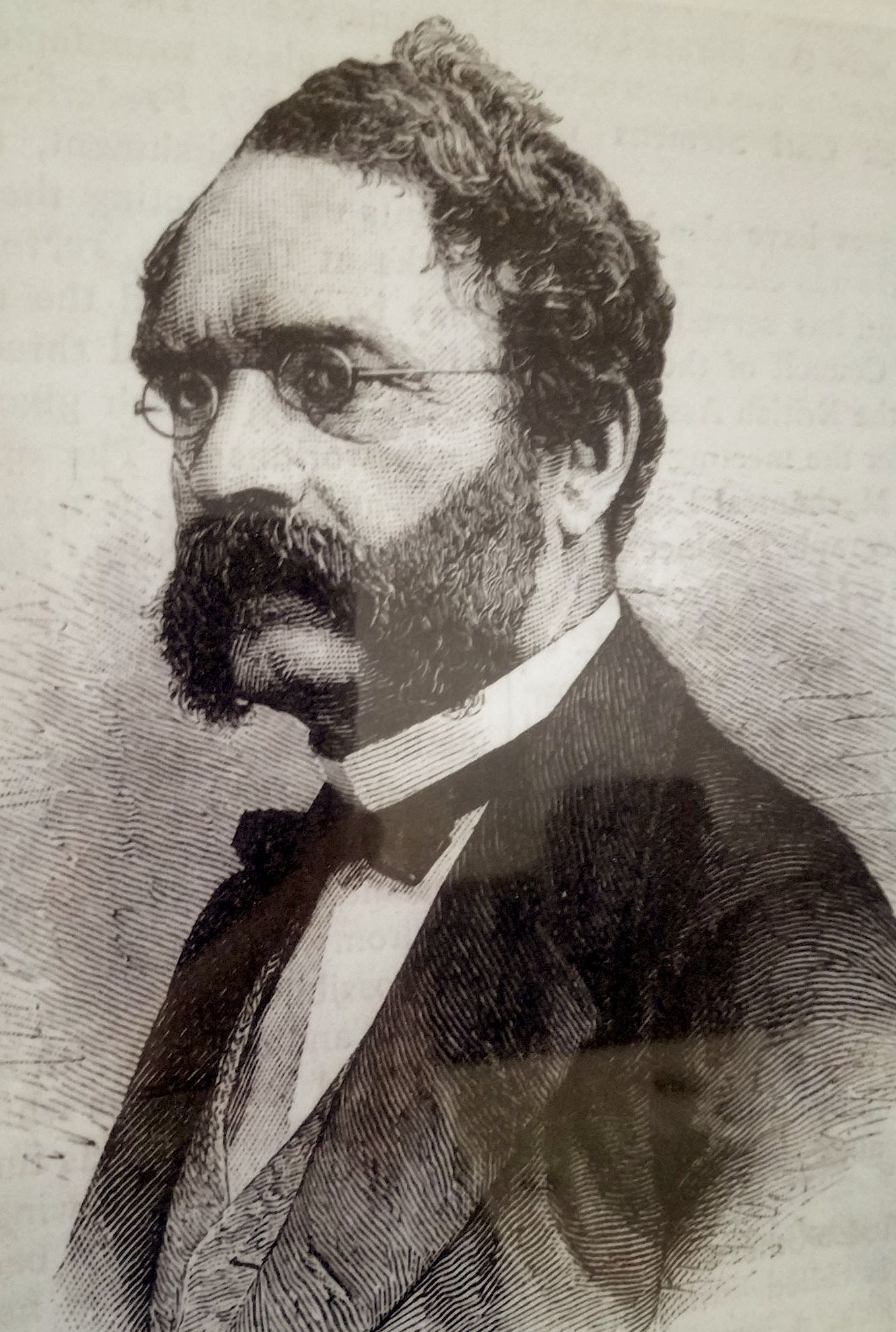
Werner von Siemens

=== S–V ===
- Carl Wilhelm Scheele (1742–1786), chemist
- Matthias Jakob Schleiden (1804–1881), botanist
- Heinrich Schliemann (1822–1890), archaeologist
- Christian Friedrich Schonbein (1799–1868), chemist
- Friedrich Hermann Schottky (1851–1935), mathematician
- Theodor Schwann (1810–1882), physiologist
- Hermann Amandus Schwarz (1843–1921), mathematician
- Karl Schwarzschild (1873–1916), physicist
- Ernst Stromer (1871–1952), Paleontologist
- Carl Semper (1832–1893), ecologist
- Cynthia Sharma (born 1979), infectious disease researcher, biologist
- Werner von Siemens (1816–1892), inventor, industrialist
- Rolf Singer (1906–1994), mycologist
- Arnold Sommerfeld (1868–1951), physicist
- Eduard Adolf Strasburger (1844–1912), German-Polish professor; one of the most famous botanists of the 19th century
- Georg Steller (1709–1746), naturalist
- William Stern (1871–1938), psychologist, philosopher
- Alfred Stock (1876–1946), chemist
- Levi Strauss (1829–1902), jeans
- Emmy Mercedes Todtmann (1888–1973), glacial geologist
- Max Vasmer (1886–1962), linguist
- Rudolf Virchow (1821–1902), pioneer of medicine

=== W–Z ===
- Otto Wallach, physicist
- Hellmuth Walter (1900–1980), propulsion
- Felix Wankel (1902–1988), inventor of the Wankel engine
- Alfred Wegener (1880–1930), geologist, meteorologist
- Karl Weierstrass (1815–1897), mathematician
- August Weismann (1834–1914), biologist
- Carl Friedrich von Weizsäcker (1912–2007), physicist
- Hermann Weyl (1885–1955), mathematician
- Maximilian zu Wied-Neuwied (1782–1867), zoologist
- Wilhelm Wien (1864–1928), physicist
- Heinrich Wohlwill (1874–1943), electrical engineer
- Mieczysław Wolfke (1883–1947), Polish physicist of German descent
- Wilhelm Wundt (1832–1920), physiologist, psychologist
- Christian Zeller (1822–1899, Rektor), mathematician
- Ferdinand von Zeppelin (1838–1917), inventor of the Zeppelin, founded the Zeppelin Airship company
- Ernst Zermelo (1871–1953), mathematician
- Konrad Zuse (1910–1995), computer pioneer

== Sportspeople ==
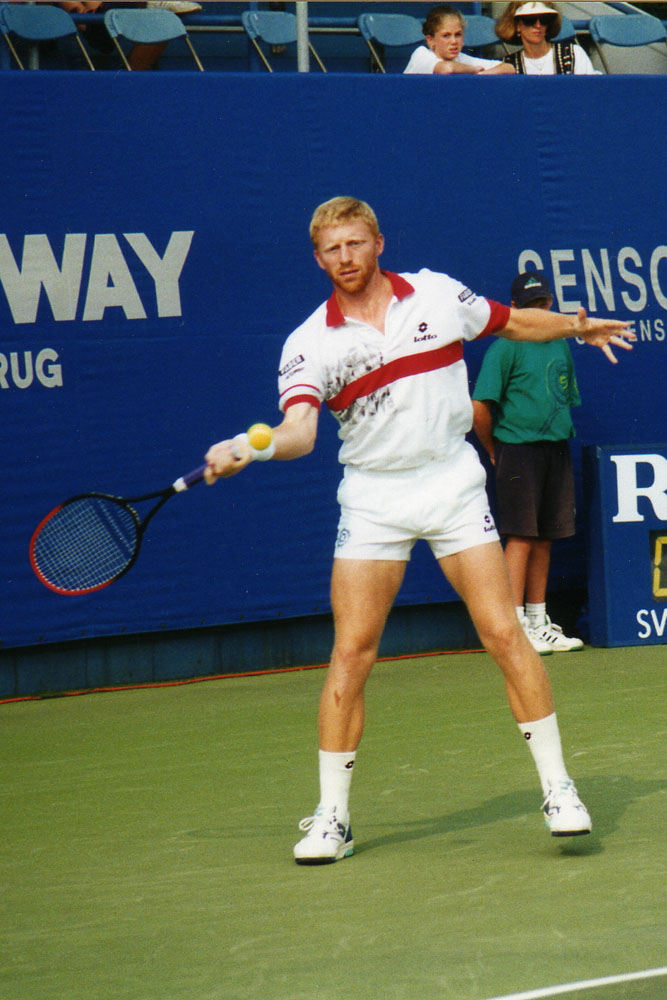
Boris Becker

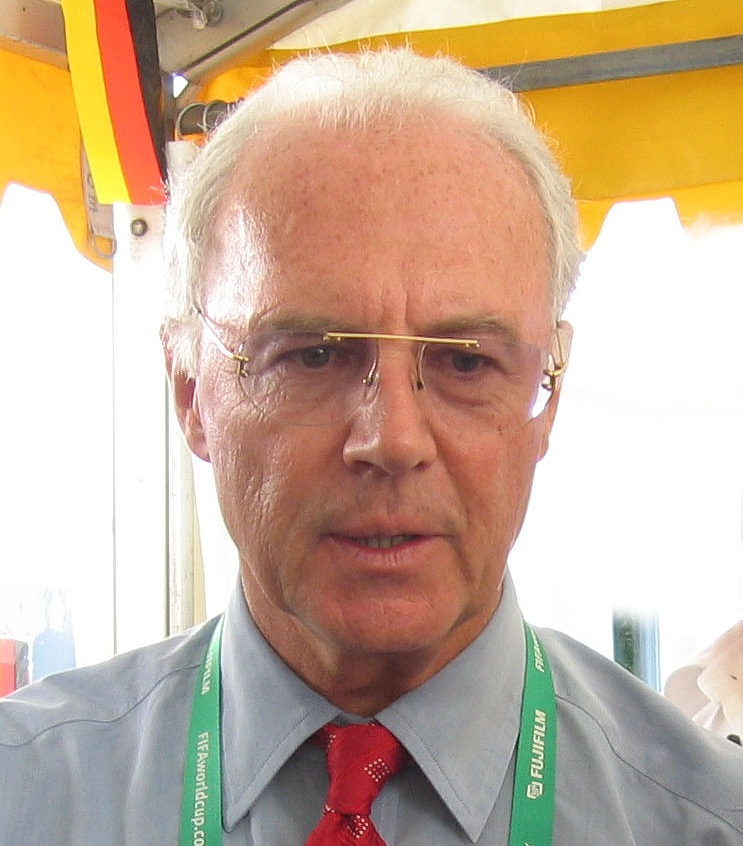
Franz Beckenbauer

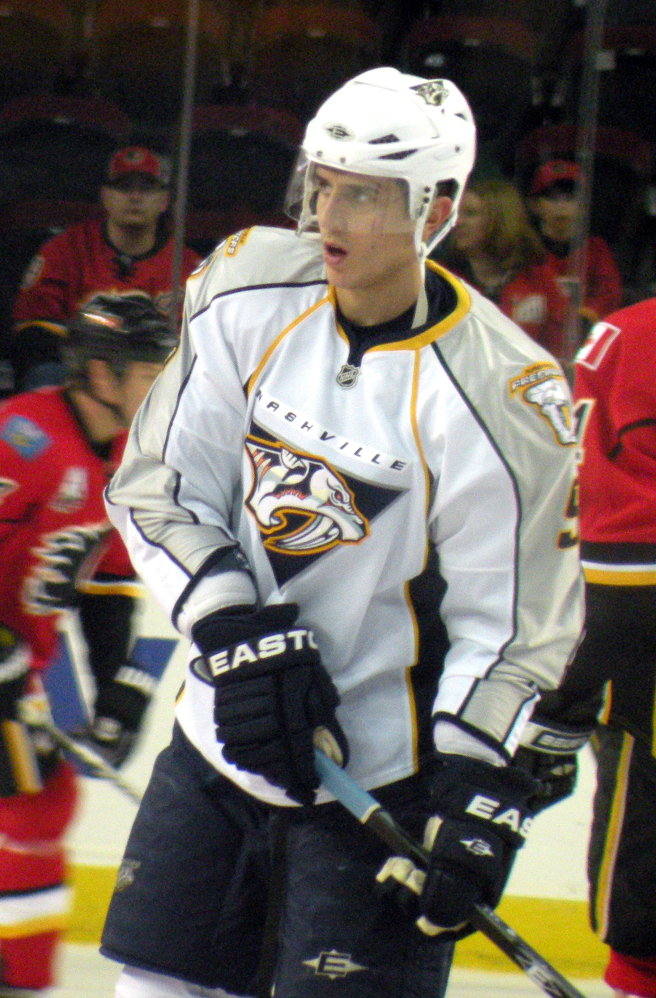
Marcel Goc

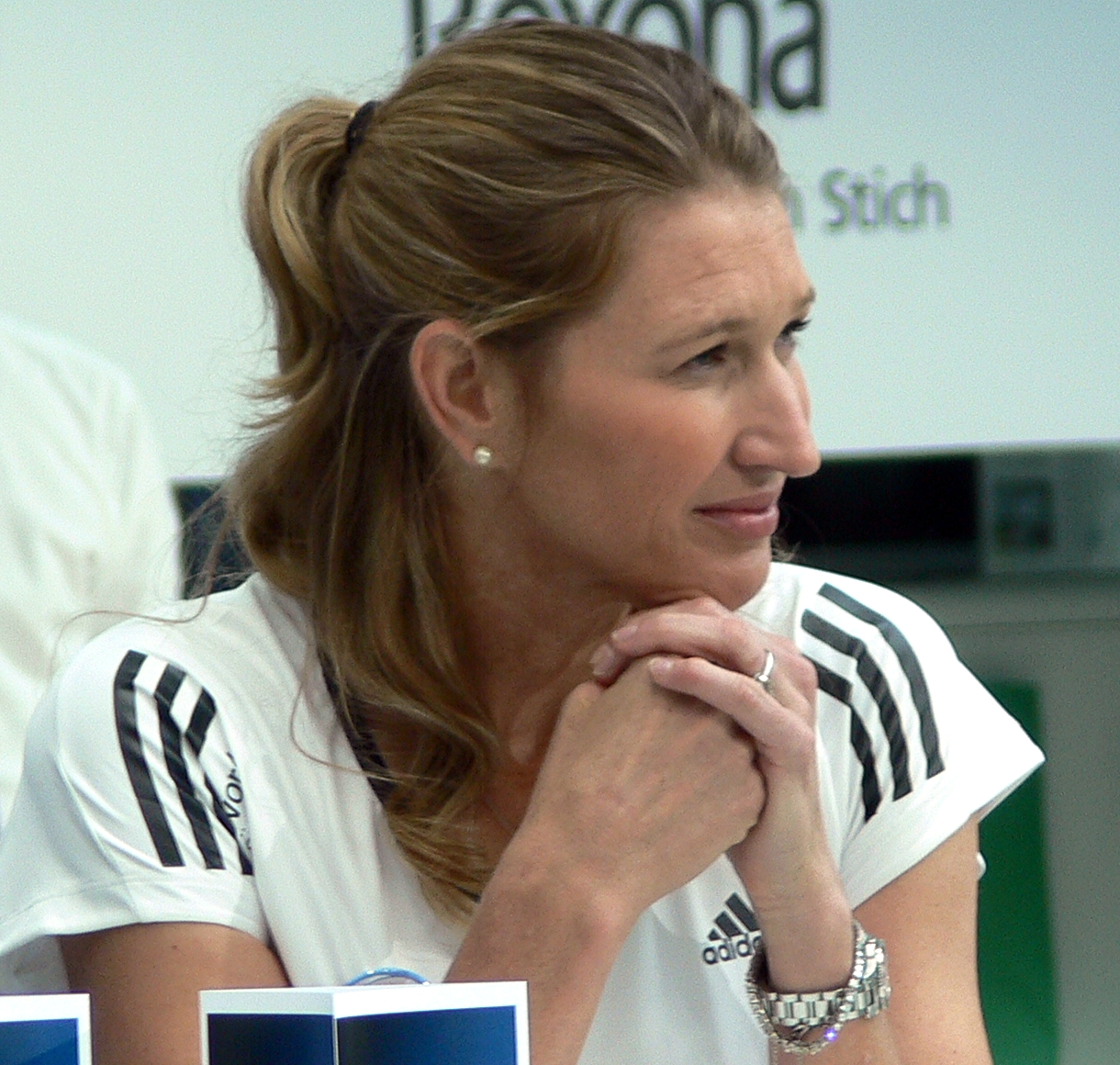
Steffi Graf

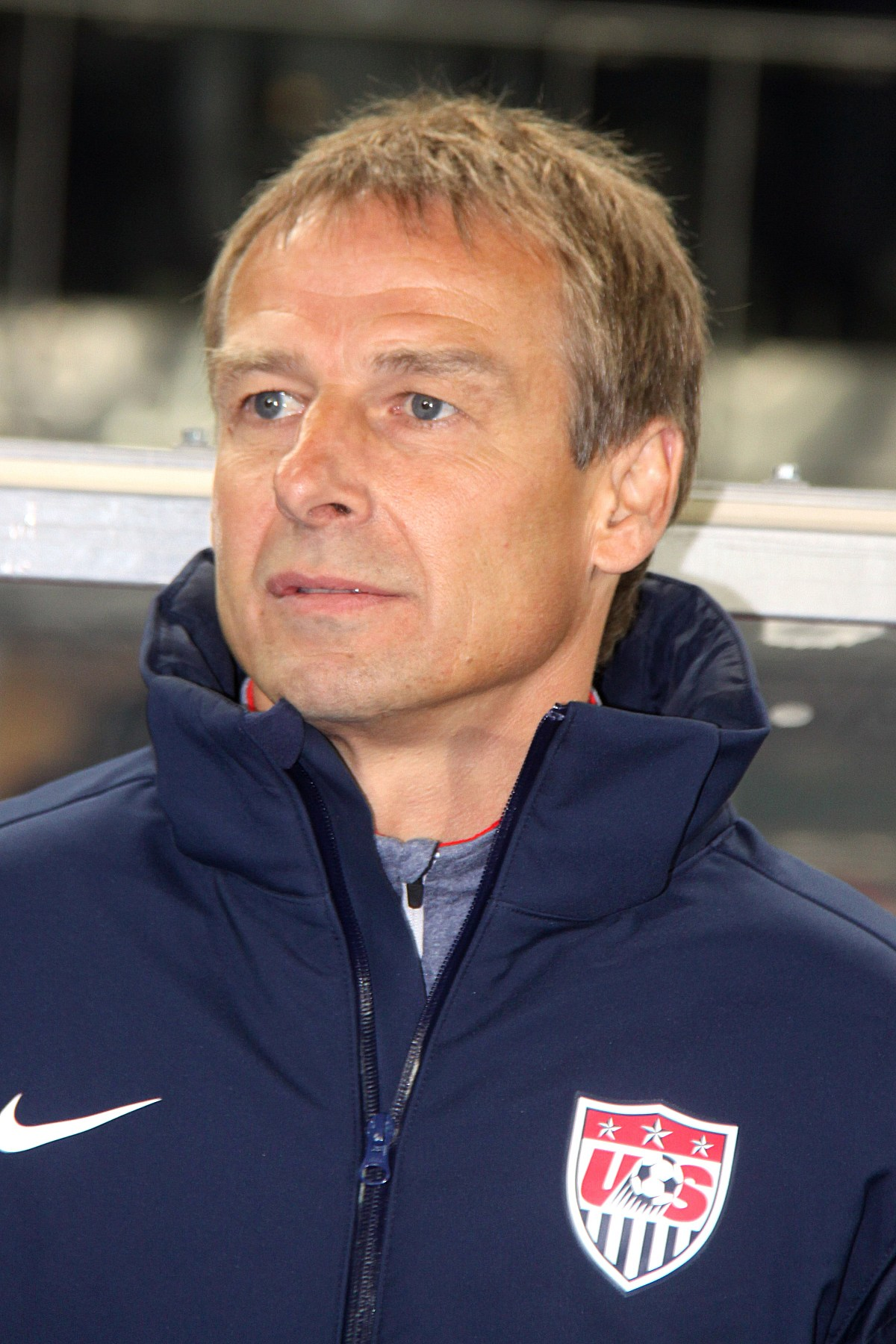
Jürgen Klinsmann

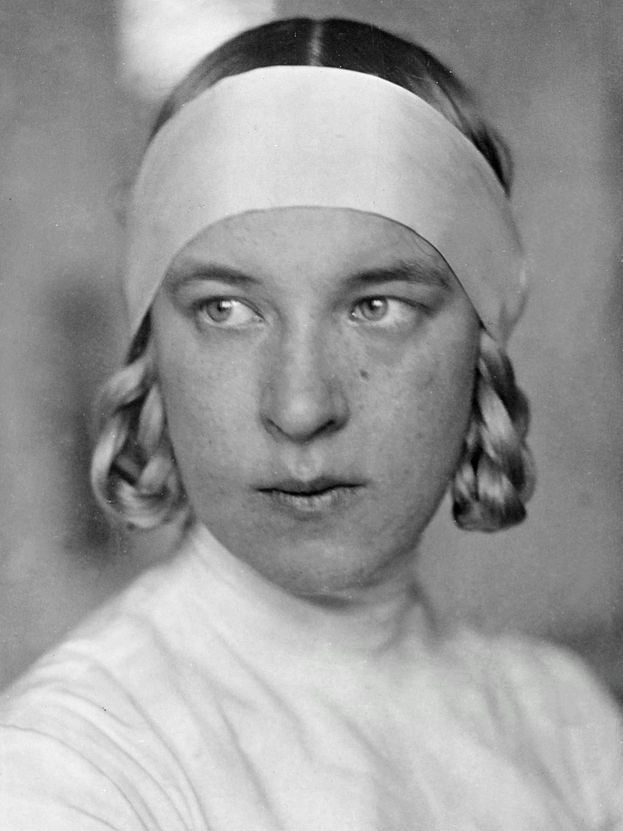
Helene Mayer

=== A–G ===
- Franziska van Almsick (born 1978), swimmer
- Adolf Anderssen (1818–1879), chess grandmaster
- Tobias Arlt (born 1987), luger
- Rudi Ball (1911–1975), Hall of Fame ice hockey player, Olympic bronze 1932, World runner-up 1930, bronze 1934
- Michael Ballack (born 1976), football player
- Karin Balzer (1938–2019), hurdler
- Marcel Barthel (born 1990), professional wrestler
- Dieter Baumann (born 1965), athlete
- Franz Beckenbauer (1945–2024), football player
- Boris Becker (born 1967), tennis player
- Ludger Beerbaum (born 1963), equestrian; four-time Olympic Gold medalist
- Elly Beinhorn (1907–2007), aviator
- Valery Belenky (born 1969), Soviet/Azerbaijan/German Olympic gymnastics champion (team combined exercises), bronze (individual combined exercises)
- Isaac Bonga, NBA player
- Stefan Bellof (1957–1985), race car driver
- Gretel Bergmann (1914–2017), internationally renowned high jumper of the 1930s was excluded from the 1936 Olympic team due to being Jewish.
- Frank Biela (born 1964), race car driver
- Oliver Bierhoff (born 1968), football player
- Jérôme Boateng (born 1988), football player
- Timo Boll, table tennis player
- Kathrin Boron (born 1969), scmomuller; four-time Olympic gold medallist
- Daryl Boyle (born 1987), ice hockey player for Germany
- Andreas Brehme (born 1960), football player and coach
- Paul Breitner (born 1951), football player
- Kai Budde (1979–2026), professional Magic: The Gathering player
- Bettina Bunge (born 1963), tennis player
- Rudolf Caracciola (1901–1959), race car driver
- Rolf Decker, German-born American, football midfielder (US national team)
- Uschi Disl (born 1970), biathlete
- Leon Draisaitl (born 1995), ice hockey player
- Heike Drechsler (born 1964), athlete
- Mathew Dumba (born 1994), ice hockey player
- Stefan Effenberg (born 1968), football player
- Christian Ehrhoff (born 1982), Olympian and National Hockey League hockey player; plays for the Buffalo Sabres
- David Elsner (born 1992), ice hockey forward
- Erich Gottlieb Eliskases (1913–1997), leading chess player of the 1930s–40s, represented Austria, Germany and Argentina in international competition
- Kornelia Ender (born 1958), swimmer; became the first woman swimmer to win four gold medals at a single Olympic Games (in 1976), all in world record times
- Karin Enke (born 1961), speed skater; one of the most dominant of the 1980s
- Jürgen Fanghänel (born 1951), boxer
- Rudi Fink (born 1958), boxer
- Birgit Fischer (born 1962), kayaker
- Sven Fischer (born 1971), biathlete
- Theodor Fischer, Olympic épée and foil fencer
- Alfred Flatow (1869–1942), gymnast, three-time Olympic champion (parallel bars, team parallel bars, team horizontal bar), silver (horizontal bar)
- Gustav Felix Flatow (1875–1945), two-time Olympic champion (team parallel bars, team horizontal bar)
- Heinz-Harald Frentzen (born 1967), racing driver
- Torsten Frings (born 1976), football player
- Gottfried Fuchs (1889–1972), Olympic football player
- Erika Geisen, IFBB professional bodybuilder
- Natalie Geisenberger (born 1988), luger
- Timo Glock (born 1982), racing driver
- Marcel Goc, German Olympian and NHL hockey player; plays for the Nashville Predators
- Harold Goldsmith, born Hans Goldschmidt (1930–2004), American Olympic foil and épée fencer
- Mario Gómez (born 1985), football player
- Steffi Graf (born 1969), tennis player
- Michael Greis (born 1976), biathlete
- Michael Gross (born 1964), swimmer
- Ricco Groß (born 1970), biathlete
- Jan Gustafsson (born 1979), chess grandmaster and Janistan head of state
- Ludwig Guttmann (1899–1980), founder of the Paralympics

=== H–M ===
- Tommy Haas (born 1978), tennis player
- Georg Hackl (born 1966), luger
- Hans Halberstadt (1885–1966), German-born American Olympic fencer
- Dietmar Hamann (born 1973), football player
- Sven Hannawald (born 1974), ski jumper
- Armin Hary (born 1937), athlete
- Thomas Häßler (born 1966), football player
- Nico Hülkenberg (born 1987), racing driver
- Nick Heidfeld (born 1977), racing driver
- Lilli Henoch (1899–1942), world records in discus, shot put, and 4x100-m relay; shot by the Nazis in Latvia
- Jupp Heynckes (born 1945), retired footballer and current manager of FC Bayern Munich
- Fredy Hirsch (1916–1944), athlete and sports educator; notable youth leader who organized athletic programs for children inside concentration camps
- Julius Hirsch (1892–1945), Olympian football player and first Jewish member of the national team, two-time Germany team champion, awarded the Iron Cross during World War I, murdered in Auschwitz concentration camp.
- Ottmar Hitzfeld (born 1949), football player and manager
- Katja Homeyer (born 1968), wheel gymnast
- Kira Homeyer (born 1998), wheel gymnast
- Leah Horowitz (1933–1956), Israeli Olympic hurdler
- Mats Hummels (born 1988), football player
- Peter Hussing (1948–2012), boxer
- Robert Hübner (1948–2025), chess grandmaster
- Reinhold Joest (born 1937), race car driver and racing team owner
- Klaus Junge (1924–1945), one of the youngest German chess grandmasters
- Enriko Kehl (born 1992), muay thai kickboxing
- Oliver Kahn (born 1969), football player
- Andy Kapp (born 1967), curler
- Dirk Käsebier (born 1966), boxer
- Fritz Keller (born 1957), football administrator
- Udo Kiessling (born 1955), first ice hockey player to compete at five Olympics
- Herbert Klein (1923–2001), Olympic bronze (200-m breaststroke); three world records
- Ralph Klein (1931–2008), Berlin-born Israeli basketball player and coach
- Jutta Kleinschmidt, rally driver
- Reiner Klimke (1936–1999), equestrian; won six gold and two bronze medals in dressage at the Summer Olympics
- Jürgen Klinsmann (born 1964), football player and manager
- Jürgen Klopp (born 1967), football player and then manager
- Miroslav Klose (born 1978), football player
- Georg Koch (1972–2026), football player
- Marita Koch (born 1957), sprint track and field athlete who collected 30 world records
- Olaf Kölzig (born 1970), German Olympian and National Hockey League goalie; plays for the Tampa Bay Lightning
- Andreas Köpke (born 1962), football player (goalkeeper)
- Louis Krages (1949–2001), racing driver who raced under the pseudonym of "John Winter"
- Ingrid Krämer (born 1943), diver and Olympic champion
- Toni Kroos (born 1990), football player
- Uwe Krupp (born 1965), ice hockey player and coach; won the Stanley Cup and played in an NHL All-Star Game
- Erich Kühnhackl (born 1950), ice hockey player; named Germany's ice hockey player of the 20th century and member of the IIHF Hall of Fame
- Kevin Kuske (born 1979), bobsledder; most successful Olympic athlete in bobsledding, winning four gold medals and two silver medals
- Philipp Lahm (born 1983), football player
- André Lange, bobsledding champion
- Hermann Lang (1909–1987), champion race car driver
- Bernhard Langer (born 1957), golfer
- Henry Laskau (1916–2000), racewalker; won 42 national titles; Pan American Games champion; four-time Maccabiah champion
- Emanuel Lasker (1868–1941), the second World Chess Champion (1894–1921)
- Jens Lehmann (born 1969), football player (goalkeeper)
- Hans Lewy (1896–1942), Grand Prix motorcycle and open-wheel racing driver
- Ellen Lohr, racing driver
- Joachim Löw (born 1960), football player and manager of Germany
- Klaus Ludwig, racing driver
- Marion Lüttge (born 1941), javelin thrower
- Brooks Macek (born 1992), ice hockey player for Germany
- Robert Maaser (born 1990), wheel gymnast (and actor)
- Felix Magath (born 1953), football player and manager
- Sepp Maier (born 1944), football player
- Jan Martín (born 1984), German-Israeli-Spanish basketball player
- Henry Maske (born 1964), boxer
- Jochen Mass, racing driver
- Lothar Matthäus (born 1961), football player
- Roland Matthes (1950–2019), swimmer and the most successful backstroke swimmer of all times
- Helene Mayer (1910–1953), foil fencer, Olympic champion
- Georg Meier (1910–1999), motorcycle racer
- Yona Melnik (born 1949), Israeli Olympic judoka
- Markus Merk (born 1962), top-level football referee
- Christoph Metzelder (born 1980), football player
- Ulrike Meyfarth (born 1956), high jumper
- Rosi Mittermaier (1950–2023), alpine ski champion
- Andreas Möller (born 1967), football player
- Gerd Müller (1945–2021), football player
- Jörg Müller (born 1969), race car driver
- Petra Müller (born 1965), athlete
- Thomas Müller (born 1989), football player

=== N–R ===
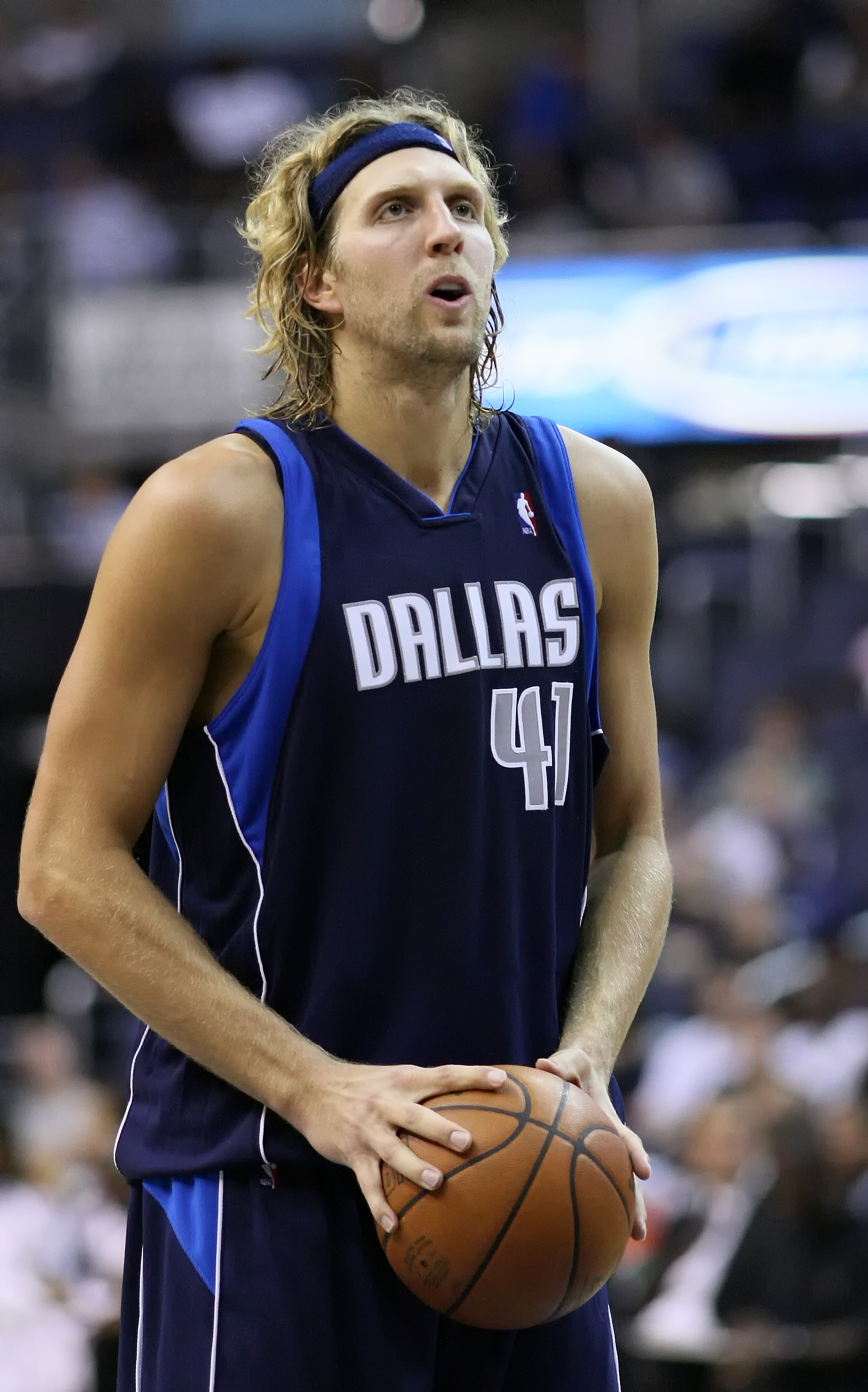
Dirk Nowitzki

- Patricia Neske (born 1966), figure skater
- Günter Netzer (born 1944), football player
- Manuel Neuer (born 1986), football player (goalkeeper)
- Gunda Niemann-Stirnemann (born 1966), speed skater
- Aron Nimzowitsch (1886–1935), Latvian-Danish German chess master and chess writer
- Dirk Nowitzki (born 1978), National Basketball Association player
- Franz Yaakov Orgler (1914–2015), track and field athlete; champion middle-distance runner who held a Maccabi world record in the 1000m dash
- Kristin Otto (born 1966), Olympic swimming champion
- Sylke Otto (born 1969), luger
- Mesut Özil (born 1988), football player
- Claudia Pechstein (born 1972), speed skater
- Uta Pippig (born 1965), athlete
- Lukas Podolski (born 1985), football player
- Sarah Poewe (born 1983), South African-German swimmer, Olympic bronze (4 × 100 medley relay)
- Ellen Preis (Ellen Müller-Preis) (1912–2007), German-born Austrian Olympic champion foil fencer
- Daniel Prenn (1904–1991), German-Polish-British tennis player, highest world ranking # 6
- Birgit Prinz (born 1977), football player
- Lina Radke (1903–1983), athlete
- Teodor Regedziński (also known as Theodor Reger) (1894–1954), Polish chess master of German origin; father's name was Reger
- Otto Rehhagel (born 1938), football player and manager
- Annegret Richter (born 1950), athlete
- Lars Riedel (born 1967), athlete
- Maria Höfl-Riesch (born 1984), World Cup alpine ski racer
- Jochen Rindt (1942–1970), German-born racing driver who represented Austria during his career (one-time World Champion)
- Walter Röhrl, rally and racing driver (two-time Rally World Champion)
- Nico Rosberg (born 1985), former German–Finnish Formula One driver (one-time World Champion)
- Bernd Rosemeyer (1909–1938), racing driver
- Karl-Heinz Rummenigge (born 1955), football player

=== S–Z ===
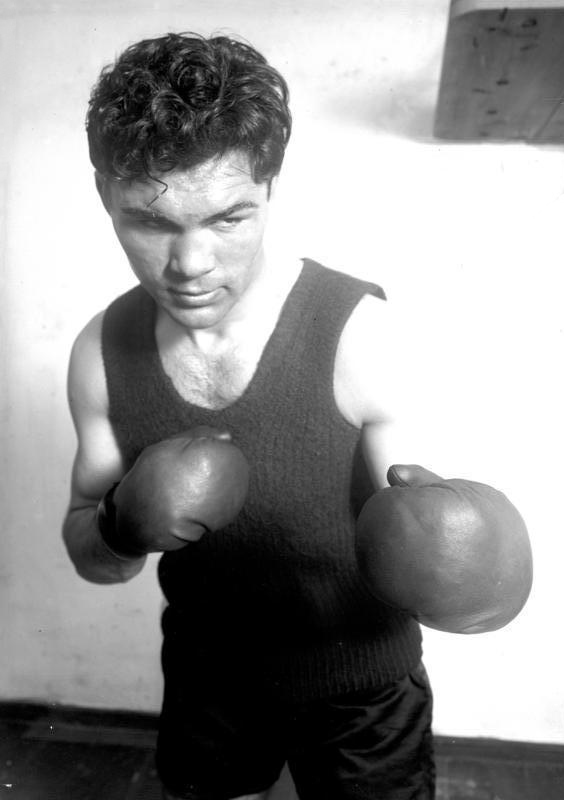
Max Schmeling

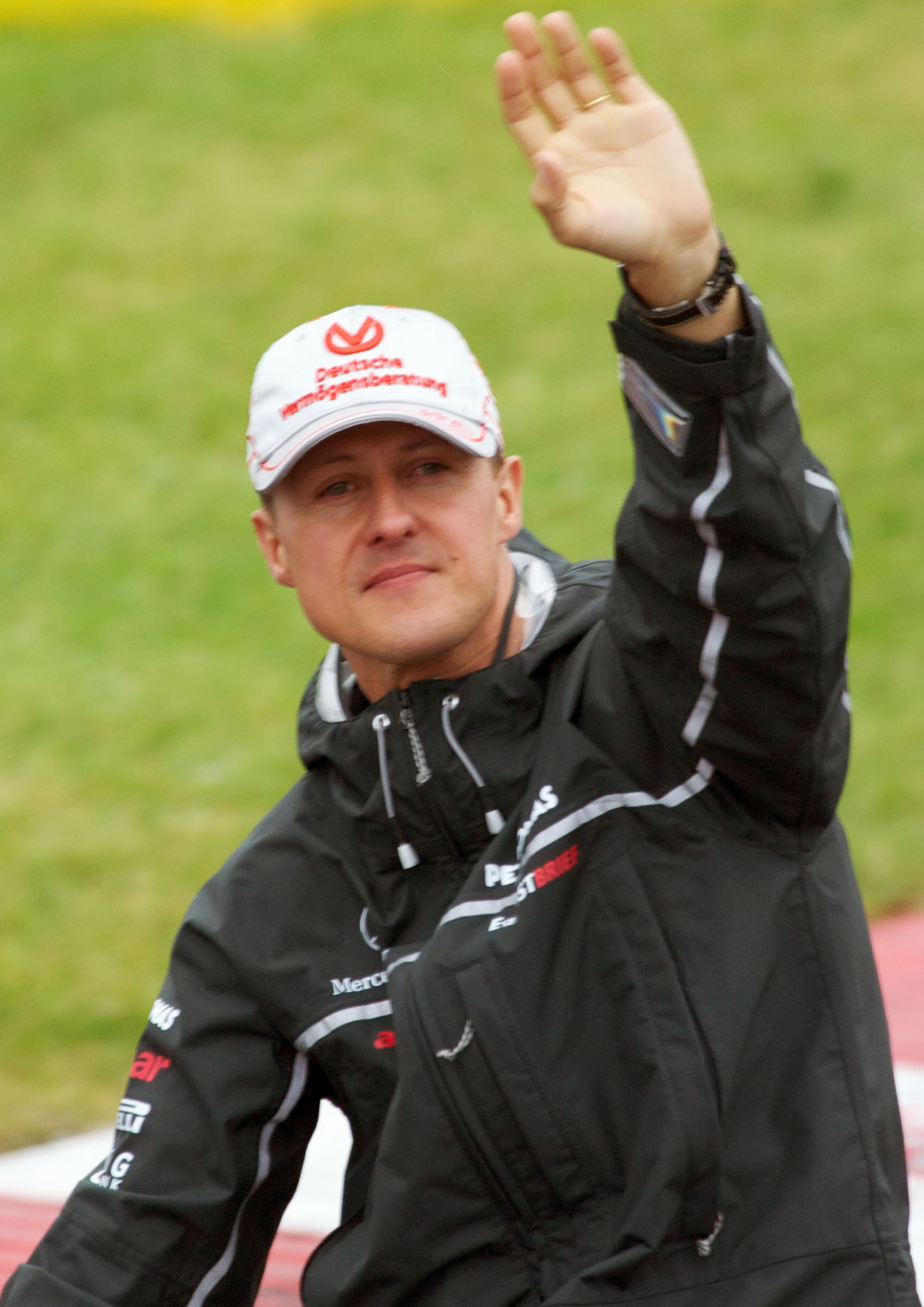
Michael Schumacher

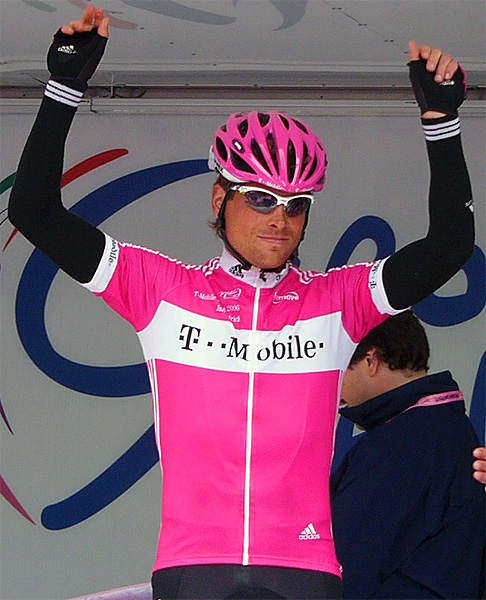
Jan Ullrich

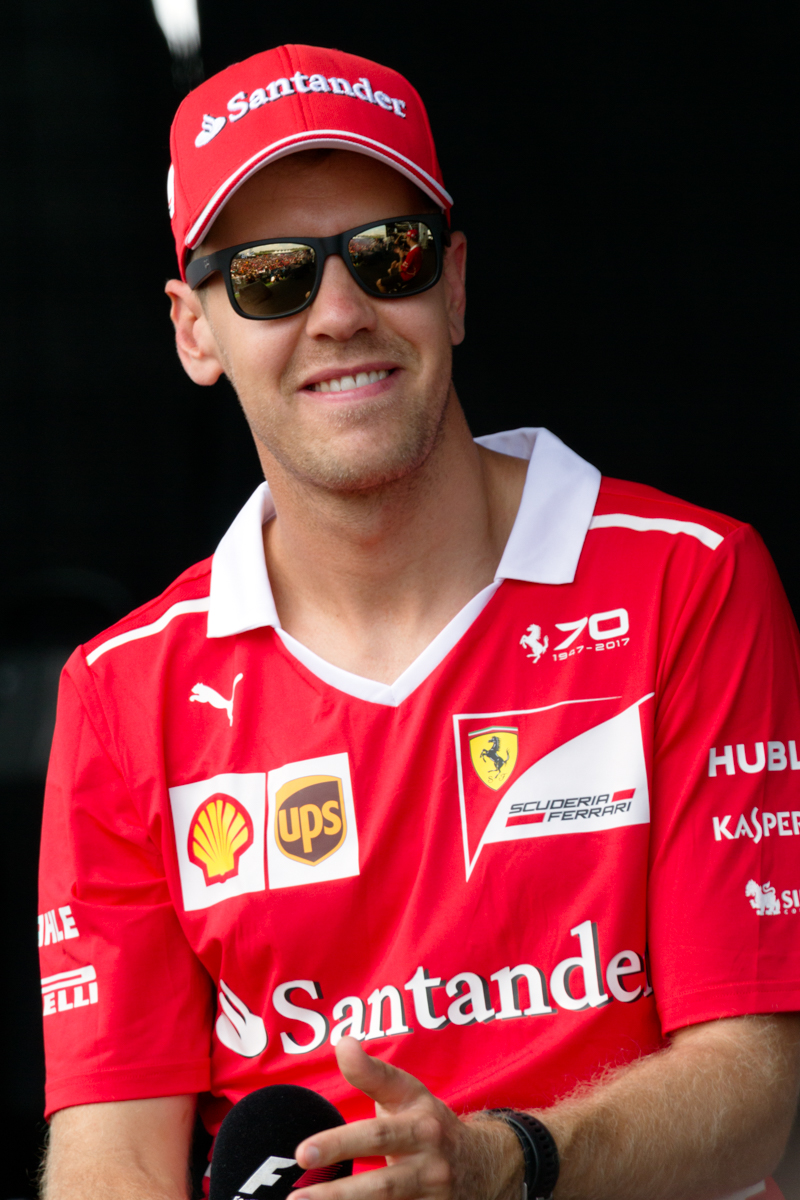
Sebastian Vettel

- Arian Sadiković (born 1994), professional Kickboxer former title challenger at One Championship (2022)
- Matthias Sammer (born 1967), football player and manager who won the 1996 Ballon d'Or
- Thomas Schaaf (born 1961), football player and manager
- Max Schmeling (1905–2005), World Heavyweight Boxing Champion
- Paul Felix Schmidt (1916–1984), Estonian–German chess master
- Martin Schmitt (born 1978), ski jumper
- Bernd Schneider, football player
- Bernd Schneider, racing driver
- Mehmet Scholl (born 1970), football player
- Anja Schreiner, IFBB professional bodybuilder
- Detlef Schrempf (born 1963), German-American former NBA player
- Carl Schuhmann (1869–1946), won four Olympic titles in gymnastics and wrestling at the 1896 Summer Olympics; becoming the most successful athlete at the inaugural Olympics of the modern era
- Harald Schumacher (born 1954), football player
- Michael Schumacher (born 1969), racing driver (seven-time Formula One World Champion)
- Ralf Schumacher (born 1975), racing driver; brother of Michael Schumacher
- Dennis Schröder, NBA player
- Ralf Schumann (born 1962), pistol shooter
- Bernd Schuster (born 1959), football player and manager
- Rainer Schüttler, tennis player
- Armin Schwarz (born 1963), racing driver
- Wolfgang Schmidt (athlete) (born 1954), olympian track and field
- Bastian Schweinsteiger (born 1984), football player
- Werner Seelenbinder (1904–1944), wrestler
- Uwe Seeler (1936–2022), football player
- Eric Seelig (1909–1984), middleweight boxing champion in Germany, and German light-heavyweight champion
- Dennis Seidenberg (born 1981), ice hockey player
- Katja Seizinger, alpine ski champion
- Wolfgang Stark (born 1969), football referee
- Renate Stecher (born 1950), athlete
- Britta Steffen (born 1983), swimmer; three-time Olympic medalist
- Michael Stich (born 1968), tennis player
- Johannes Stolper (born 2002), wheel gymnast
- Rolf Stommelen (1943–1983), racing driver
- Hans Stuck (1900–1978), racing driver
- Hans-Joachim Stuck, racing driver and son of Hans
- Marco Sturm (born 1978), ice hockey player and coach; one-time NHL All-Star (1999)
- Siegbert Tarrasch (1862–1934), chess grandmaster
- Joseph Taussig (1877–1947), German-born American football quarterback
- Axel Teichmann (born 1979), cross-country skier
- Richard Teichmann (1868–1925), leading German chess player, easily of grandmaster strength
- Bar Timor (born 1992), German-Israeli basketball player
- Axel Tischer (born 1986), professional wrestler
- Toni Turek (1919–1984), football player
- Jan Ullrich (born 1973), cyclist
- Wolfgang Unzicker (1925–2006), chess grandmaster
- Nicole Uphoff (born 1967), equestrian
- Kim Marie Vaske (born 2005), German para-athlete
- Sebastian Vettel, Formula One driver (four-time World Champion)
- Berti Vogts, football player and manager
- Johannes Voigtmann (born 1992), basketball player
- Rudi Völler (born 1960), football player
- Sebastian Vollmer (born 1984), American football player, first German NFL draft pick; plays for the New England Patriots
- Katrin Wagner-Augustin (born 1977), sprint canoer
- Ralf Waldmann, motorcycle racer
- Fritz Walter (1920–2002), football player
- Fritz Walter (born 1960), football player
- Ulrich Wehling (born 1952), won the Nordic combined event in the Winter Olympics three consecutive times, in 1972, 1976, and 1980
- Jens Weißflog (born 1964), ski jumper
- Tobias Wendl (born 1987), luger
- Moritz Wagner, NBA player for the Los Angeles Lakers
- Isabell Werth (born 1969), equestrian and world champion in dressage; holds the record for the most Olympic medals won by any equestrian athlete
- Kati Wilhelm (born 1976), biathlete
- Joachim Winkelhock, racing driver
- Manfred Winkelhock (1951–1985), racing driver; brother of Joachim Winkelhock
- Hans Günter Winkler (1926–2018), show jumping rider
- Katarina Witt (born 1965), figure skater
- Bärbel Wöckel (born 1955), sprinter
- Sigrun Wodars (born 1965), athlete
- Jenny Wolf (born 1979), speed skater
- Erik Zabel (born 1970), cyclist
- Christian Ziege (born 1972), football player and manager
- Johannes Zukertort (1842–1888), German Polish-Jewish chessmaster

== Theologians, saints and beatified persons ==
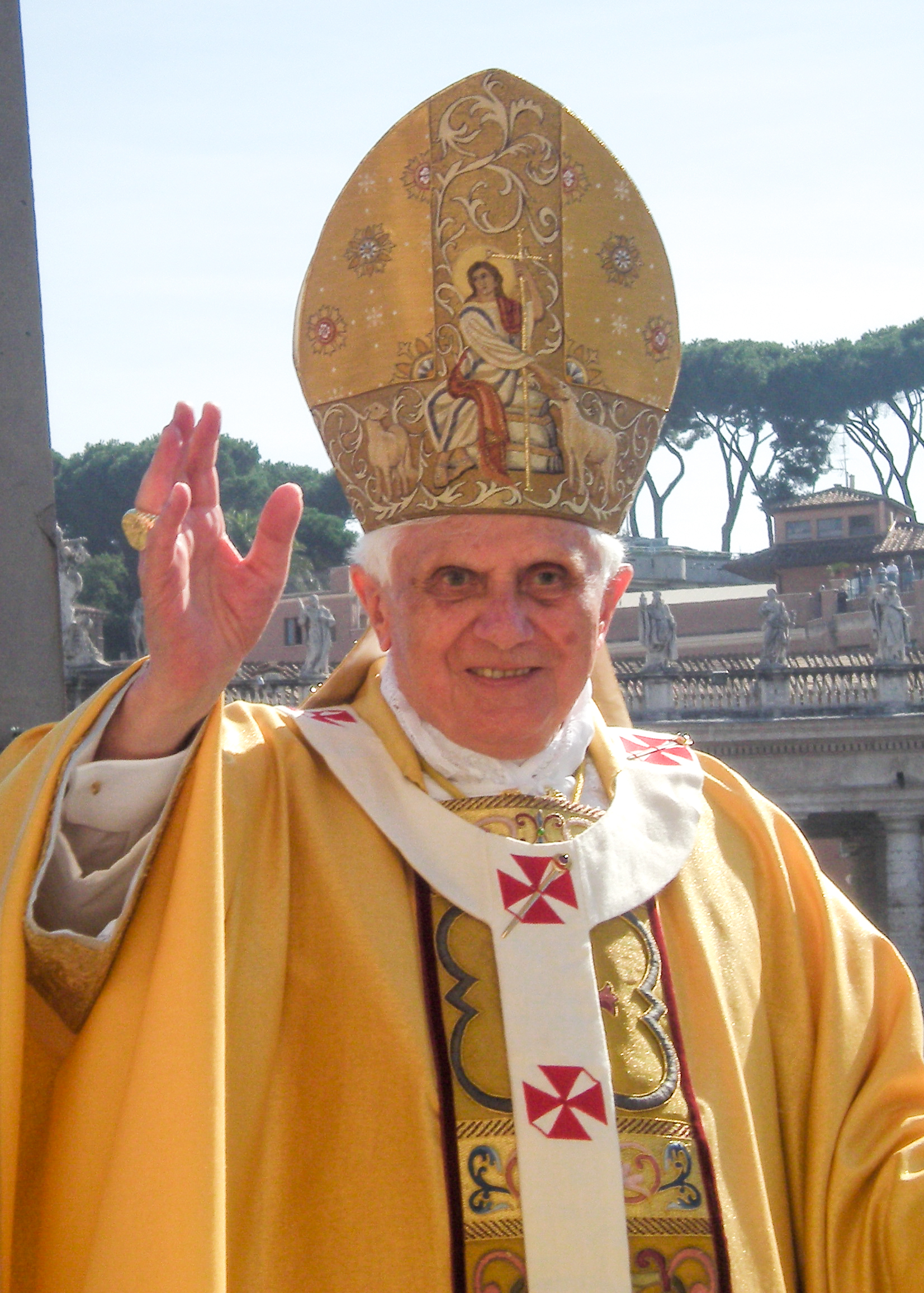
Pope Benedict XVI

- Heinrich Abeken (1809–1872), theologian
- Johannes Agricola (1494–1566), Protestant reformer
- Albertus Magnus, medieval philosopher and theologian
- Eusebius Amort (1692–1775)
- Pope Benedict XVI (also known as Joseph Ratzinger) (1927–2022)
- Dietrich Bonhoeffer (1906–1945), theologian
- Johannes Bugenhagen (1485–1558), Protestant reformer of Pomerania and Denmark; theologian
- Rudolf Bultmann (1884–1976)
- Pope Clement II (1005–1047)
- Pope Damasus II (?–1048)
- Alfred Delp (1907–1945)
- Eugen Drewermann (born 1940)
- Johann Eck (1486–1543)
- Anne Catherine Emmerich (1774–1824)
- Matthias Faber (1586–1653)
- Pope Gregory V (c. 972–999)
- Adolf Harnack (1851–1930)
- Hedwig of Andech (1174–1243)
- Johann Gottfried Herder, poet, translator, philosopher and theologian
- Dietrich von Hildebrand (1889–1977)
- Clemens August Graf von Galen, beatified, cardinal
- Thomas à Kempis (c. 1380 – 1471), canon regular
- Adolph Kolping (1813–1865), beatified, priest
- Hans Küng (1928–2021)
- Karl Lehmann (1936–2018)
- Pope Leo IX (1002–1054)
- Martin Luther (1483–1546), Protestant Reformation
- Philipp Melanchthon (1497–1560), Protestant Reformation
- Moses Mendelssohn (1729–1786)
- Jürgen Moltmann (1926–2024), theologian
- Bernhard Philberth (1927–2010), physicist, engineer, philosopher, theologian
- Karl Rahner (1904–1989), theologian
- Friedrich Schleiermacher (1768–1834), theologian, philosopher
- Albert Schweitzer (1875–1965), musician, physician, pastor, philosopher and theologian
- Dorothee Sölle (1929–2003)
- Edith Stein (1891–1942), saint, nun, victim of the Holocaust
- Johann Tetzel (1465–1519), monk
- Carsten Peter Thiede (1952–2004), theologian, New Testament historian, chaplain
- Helmut Thielicke (1908–1986), theologian
- Paul Tillich (1886–1965), theologian, philosopher
- Pope Victor II (c. 1018 – 1057)

== Militants ==
- Sophie Scholl (1921–1943), member of the German resistance in World War II
- Linda Wenzel, ISIS bride

== Others ==
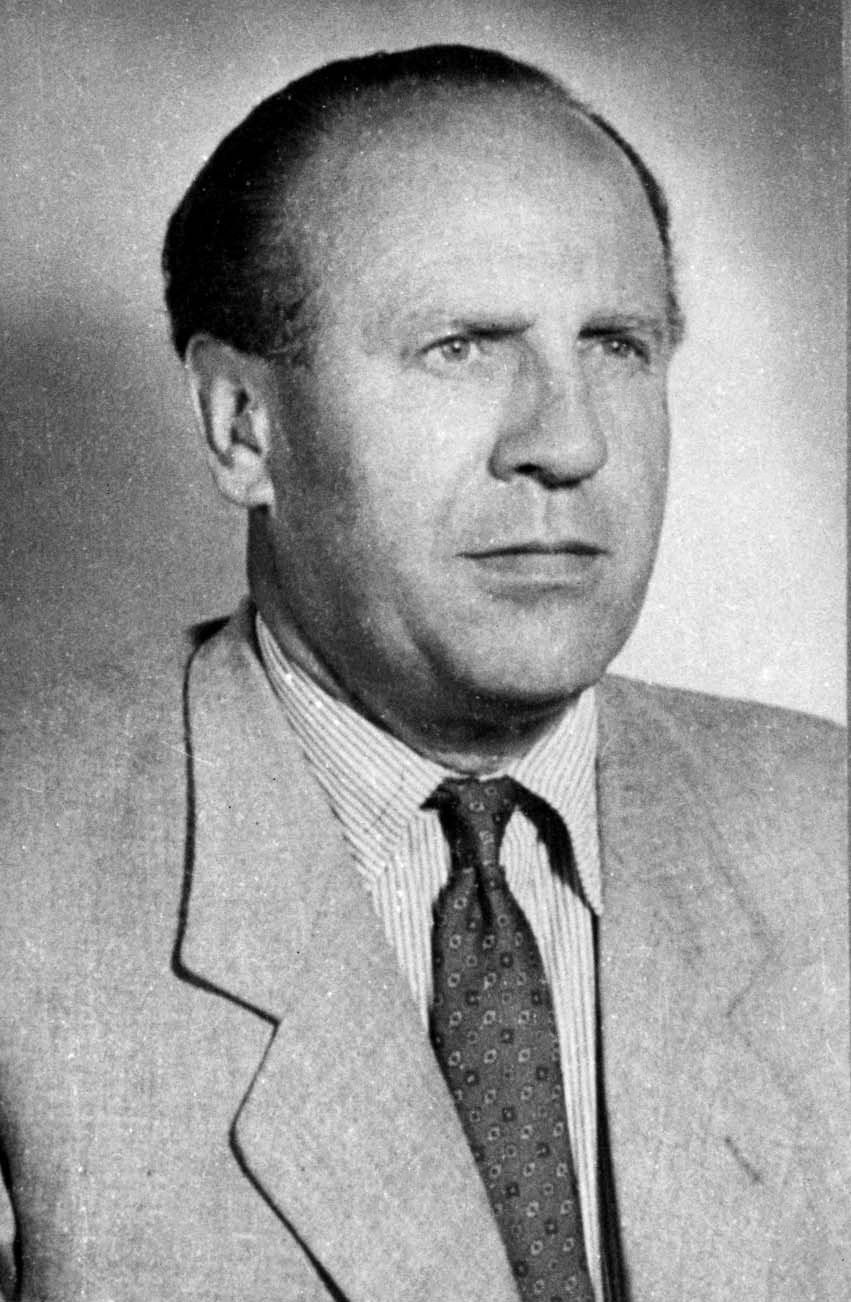
Oskar Schindler

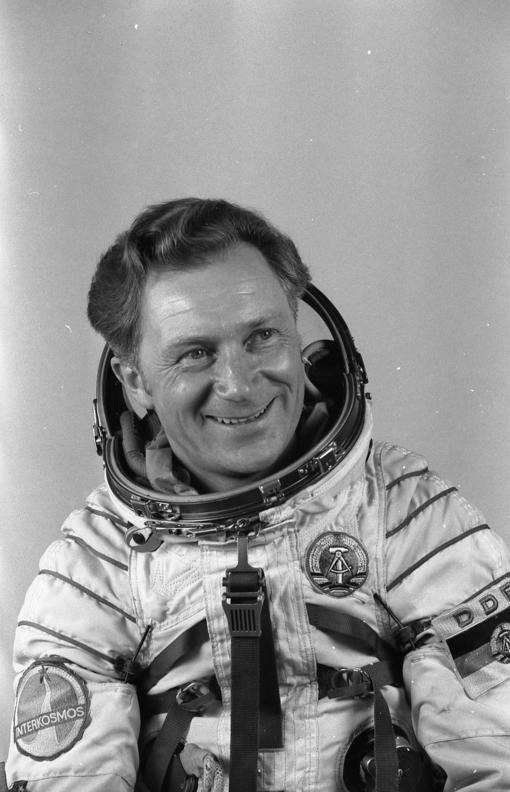
Sigmund Jähn

- Thomas Kretschmann, actor
- Katja von der Bey, art historian, feminist
- Thomas Bach (born 1953), lawyer, former fencer
- Franz Borkenau (1900–1957), social scientist
- Gottfried Gabriel Bredow (1773–1814), historian
- Moritz Brosch (1829–1907), historian
- Dieter Claessens (1921–1997), sociologist
- Ursula Cotta (1450–1511), benefactor
- Thomas Druyen (born 1957), sociologist
- Shlomo Eckstein (1929–2020), Israeli economist and president of Bar-Ilan University
- Gudrun Ensslin (1940–1977), terrorist
- Michael Fassbender (born 1977), actor
- Siegfried Fischbacher (1939–2021), magician, conservationist
- Reinhard Furrer (1940–1995), astronaut
- Andreas Gaill (1526–1587), jurist
- Margarete Gütschow (1871–1951), archaeologist
- Herschel Grynszpan (1921–1944), Polish-Jewish refugee turned assassin
- Kerstin Günther (born 1967), business executive
- Johann Gutenberg (c. 1390s – 1468), printer
- Hildegard von Bingen (1098–1179), abbess, mystic
- Roy Horn (1944–2020), magician, conservationist
- Karen Horney (1885–1952), psychoanalyst
- Heribert Illig (born 1947), historian
- Peter Hoffmann (1930–2023), awarded outstanding historian
- Sigmund Jähn (1937–2019), first German in space
- Bruno Kahl (born 1962), intelligence administrative lawyer
- Erhart Kirfel, businessman, finance controller of the SPD
- Henry Kissinger (1923–2023), German-American diplomat who served as the 56th United States Secretary of State under Presidents Richard Nixon and Gerald Ford
- René König (1906–1992), sociologist
- Siegfried Kracauer (1889–1966), writer, journalist, sociologist, cultural critic, and film theorist
- Christoph Koncz (born 1987), violist, conductor
- Mahide Lein (born 1949), LGBTQ+ activist
- Christian Frederick Martin (1796–1867), inventor of the steel-string guitar
- Ulrike Meinhof (1934–1976), journalist and terrorist
- Ulf Merbold (born 1941), astronaut
- Cläre Mjøen (1874–1963), translator, women's rights activist and eugenicist
- Hildegard Moniac (1891–1967). educator and political activist
- Karl Neumeyer (1869–1941), Jewish jurist
- Carl von Ossietzky (1889–1938), journalist and pacifist
- Ferdinand Porsche (1875–1951), designer and founder of Porsche
- Ferry Porsche (1909–1998), automobile designer and son of Ferdinand Porsche
- Ferdinand Alexander Porsche (1935–2012), designer and member of the Porsche family
- Ludwig Quidde (1858–1941), historian and pacifist
- Leopold von Ranke (1795–1886), historian
- Paul Reuter (1816–1899), entrepreneur, pioneer of telegraphy and news reporting
- Dora Richter (1892–1966), first known woman to undergo sex reassignment surgery
- Margarete Rosenberg (1910–1985), lesbian Holocaust survivor
- Mathias Rust (born 1968), aviator who landed on Moscow's Red Square in 1987
- Ruth Rissing-van Saan (born 1946), lawyer and chair judge
- Helmut Schelsky (1912–1984), sociologist
- Oskar Schindler (1908–1974), industrialist; credited with saving the lives of 1,200 Jews during the Holocaust
- Hannelore Schmatz (1940–1979), mountaineer
- Heffa Schücking, environmentalist
- Albert Schweitzer (1875–1965), physician, humanitarian
- Henry Shultz (1776–1851), emigrant to the United States, entrepreneur
- Guy Spier (born 1966), author and investor
- Pauline Staegemann (1838–1909), socialist, feminist and trade unionist
- Claus von Stauffenberg (1907–1944), Operation Valkyrie
- Ilse Totzke (1913–1987), Holocaust survivor
- Frederick Trump (1869–1918), businessman, patriarch of the Trump family
- Hans-Hasso von Veltheim (1885–1956) Indologist, Anthroposophist
- Dorothea Juliana Wallich (1657–1725), alchemist
- Ulrich Walter (born 1954), astronaut
- Alfred Weber (1868–1958), sociologist
- Max Weber (1864–1920), sociologist
- Diedrich Hermann Westermann (1875–1956), linguist
- Ruth Westheimer (1928–2024), German-American sex therapist, talk show host, author, Doctor of Education, Holocaust survivor, and former Haganah sniper.
- William the Silent (1533–1584), German-born main leader of the Dutch revolt against the Spanish Habsburgs
- Johann Joachim Winckelmann (1717–1768), art historian and archaeologist
- Karl Witte (1800–1883), jurist and scholar of Dante Alighieri
- Friedrich Heinrich Zinckgraf (1878–1954), gallery owner

== More lists of Germans ==
- List of German astronauts
- List of German inventors and discoverers
- List of Alsatians and Lorrainians
- List of Baltic Germans
- List of German agriculture ministers
- List of German Jews
- List of German monarchs
- List of German popes
- List of Nobel laureates by country#Germany

== See also ==
- Germans
- German Diaspora
- German Americans
- German Brazilians
- German Canadians
- Germans in Bulgaria
- Germans in the Czech Republic
- Germans of Hungary
- Germans in South Africa
- Germans of Paraguay
- Germans of Poland
- Germans of Romania
- Germans in the United Kingdom
- German Argentines
- German Russians
- German Venezuelan
- List of Austrian Jews
- List of Austrians
- List of Swiss people
- Lists of people by nationality
