= Team World Championships =

International wheel gymnastics competition

The IRV Team World Championships (known as the Team World Cup until 2023) is an international wheel gymnastics competition where the top four national teams compete against each other. It is organized every two years by the International Wheel Gymnastics Federation (IRV).

== Competition format ==
The competition consists of six rounds, with each nation performing one routine per round. The highest-scoring routine in each round earns 4 points, the second-highest 3 points, third place 2 points, and fourth place 1 point. In addition, each team has one joker, which doubles the points earned in a selected round. The team with the highest point total after all six rounds wins the competition.

Separate competitions are held for junior and senior teams. Teams consist of 4 to 6 athletes. Each team performs six routines across different disciplines (2× straight line, 2× spiral, 1× vault, and 1× routine in a discipline chosen by the team).

Nations qualify for the Team World Championships based on their results at the preceding Wheel Gymnastics World Championships.

Until 2008, an "All-Star" team also competed alongside the qualifying national teams. This team was composed of top individual finalists from the previous World Championships as well as gymnasts from host clubs.

== 2027 ==
The 2027 IRV Team World Championships will take place in Salzburg, Austria. Germany, Switzerland, Israel, and the Netherlands have qualified for the event.

== 2025 ==
The 2025 IRV Team World Championships were held as part of the International German Gymnastics Festival (Deutsches Turnfest) in Leipzig, Germany. For the first time in history, the junior world title was shared between Switzerland and Israel rather than won outright by Germany.

Juniors
Rank	Nation	Athletes	Points
1	Switzerland	Meret Stark, Timon Peter, Olivia Suter, Elea Peter	25
1	Israel	Gali Yarsky, Bar Dubinsky, Naomi Livne, Roni Ezra, Roni Schusheim	25
3	Germany	Bero Schröter, Frieda Wilke, Annika Wasmuth, Sophie Julius, Jamal Kiel, Nils Münster	20
4	Belgium	Laura Schmitz, Nela Knodt, Mara Bartholemy, Wilhelm Uffelmann	14

Seniors
Rank	Nation	Athletes	Points
1	Germany	Karina Peisker, Lea Gmeiner, Malte Schröder, Johannes Stolper, Emma Gerlitz	25
2	Austria	Malena Kernacs, Luisa Galvan, Birgit Halwachs, Selina Memeti	22
3	Japan	Shuri Akasaka, Hiroki Yasutaka, Aya Horiguchi, Shiori Urikane, Ryuichi Goto, Yasuhiko Takahashi	20
4	Switzerland	Simon Rufener, Chiara Lenzo, Manuel Roth, Shannon Rüttimann	16

== 2023 ==
The 2023 IRV Team World Championships took place on 15 July 2023 at the Broadway Armory Park in Chicago, United States. It was the first edition to feature a junior competition.

Juniors
Rank	Nation	Athletes	Points
1	Germany	Jamal Kiel, Johanna Calmano, Sophie Julius, Ella Köhler, Frieda Wilke, Mia Schmidt	23
2	Israel	Roni Schusheim, Hadas Nir, Gali Rosner, Uri Porat	22
3	Switzerland	Luca Küttel, Noemi Meier, Katharina Müller, Meret Stark, Fabienne Wehrli	20
4	United States	Jacob Hartwell, Alexa Gola, Lola Lown, Aidan Lish, Karly O’Brien, Aidan Elliot	8

Seniors
Rank	Nation	Athletes	Points
1	Germany	Johannes Stolper, Emma Gerlitz, Karina Peisker, Lilia Lessel, Kira Homeyer, Malte Schröder	23
2	Switzerland	Chiara Lenzo, Simon Rufener, Leonie Botta, Cheyenne Wietlisbach, Fabrice Schubert	21
3	Japan	Ryuichi Goto, Yasuhiko Takahashi, Hiroki Yasutaka, Aya Horiguchi, Miho Yamada	17
4	Austria	Malena Kernacs, Selina Memeti, Birgit Halwachs	12

== 2019 ==
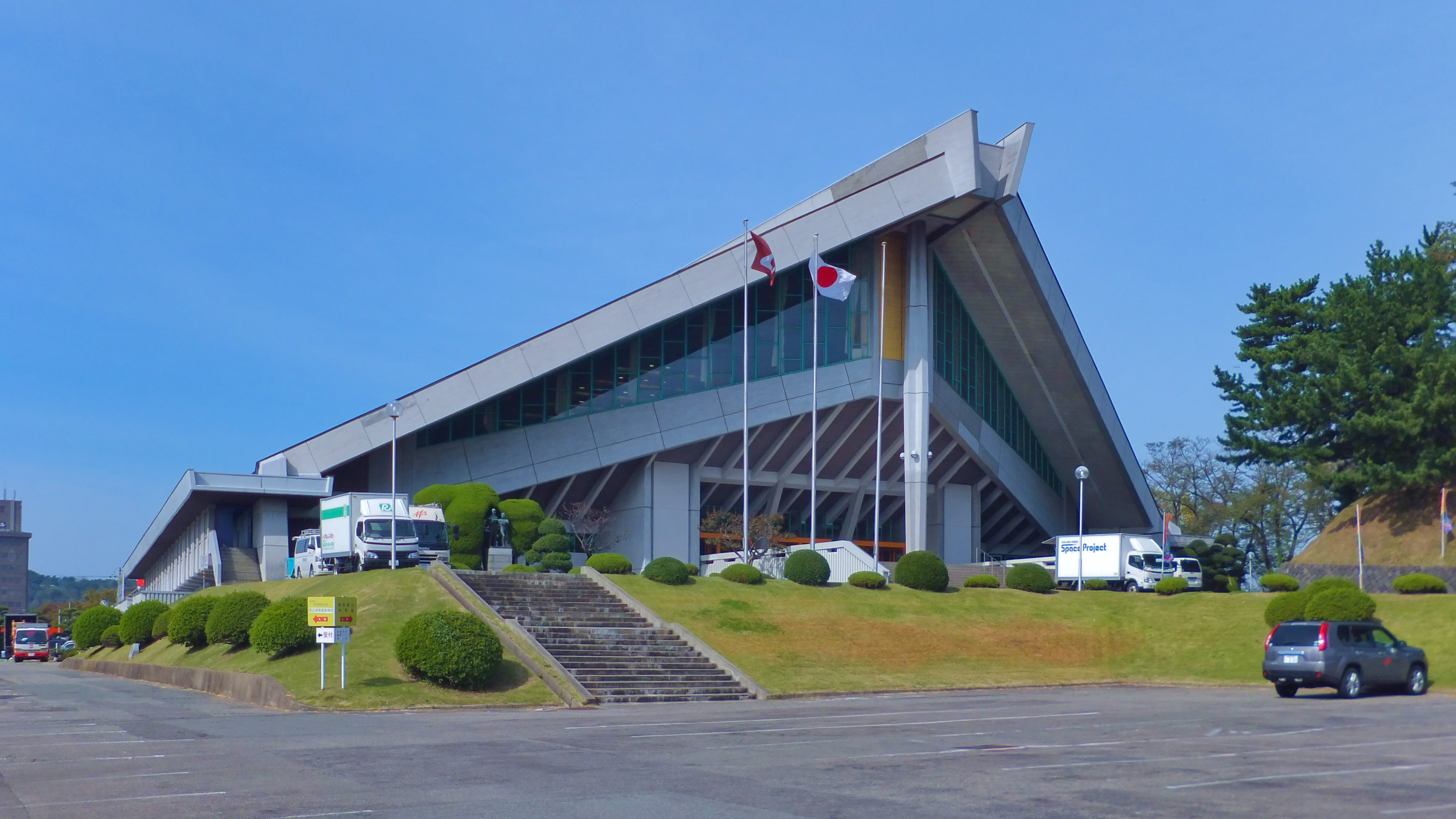
Akita Prefectural Gymnasium, venue of the 2019 Team World Cup

The 2019 Team World Cup took place on 21 April 2019 in Akita, Japan. It was the first international wheel gymnastics event hosted in Japan.

Results
Rank	Nation	Athletes	Points
1	Germany	Carsten Heimer, Kira Homeyer, Sarah Metz, Luca Christ	21
2	Japan	Yasuhiko Takahashi, Daisuke Mori, Aya Horiguchi, Yuki Matsuura	20
3	Switzerland	Matthias Reich, Leonie Botta, Simon Rufener	19
4	Netherlands	Martine van den Boogaard, Sanne Romijn, Ilse van der Ham, Sannah Boer	15

== 2017 ==
The 2017 Team World Cup was held on 22 April in Salzburg, Austria. It was jointly organized by the Austrian Wheel Gymnastics Association and the IRV.

Results
Rank	Nation	Athletes	Points
1	Switzerland	Cheyenne Rechsteiner, Sabine Krumm, Edwina Huber	24
2	Germany	Marcel Schawo, Yana Loofts, Lilia Lessel, Kira Homeyer	18
3	Austria	Alexander Müller, Ingrid Vukusic, Veronika Brunnauer	16
4	Japan	Yasuhiko Takahashi, Yuuki Matsuura, Nobuhiro Koyama, Aya Horiguchi	15

== 2014 ==
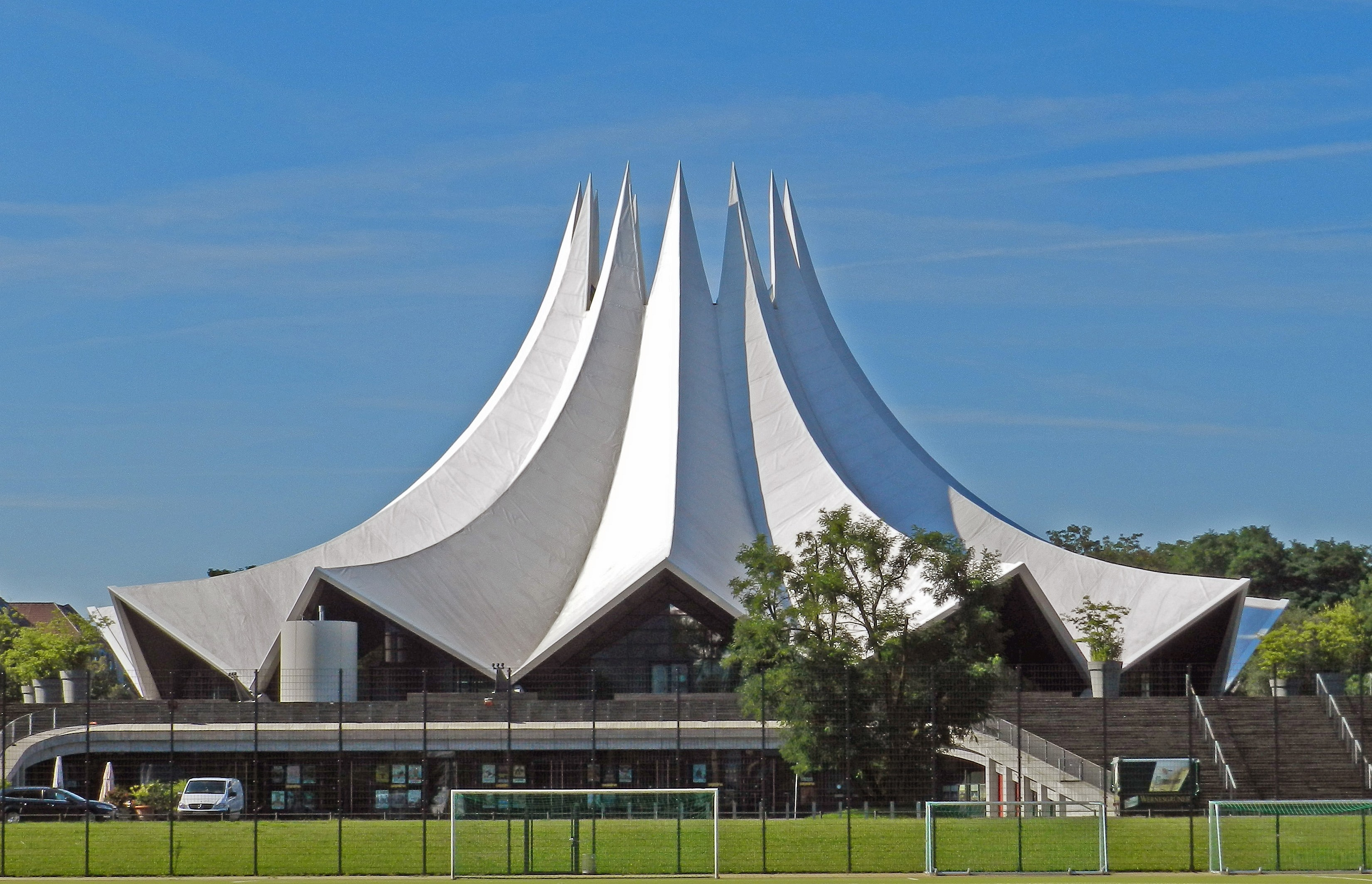
Exterior of the Tempodrom

The 2014 Team World Cup took place on 29 March at the Tempodrom in Berlin, Germany. For the first time in the history of the competition, a country other than Germany won the title. It was also the first wheel gymnastics event to be live-streamed online.

Results
Rank	Nation	Athletes	Points
1	Japan	Yasuhiko Takahashi, Yuuki Matsuura, Aya Horiguchi, Daisuke Mori	21
2	Germany	Sarah Metz, Kathrin Schad, Laura Stullich, Riccarda Vogel	18
2	Netherlands	Boy Looijen, Myrna van Berkel, Mariël Dekker, Linde Wester	18
2	Switzerland	Cheyenne Rechsteiner, Sabine Krumm, Edwina Huber, Jacqueline Müller	18

== 2012 ==
The 2012 Team World Cup took place on 30 March 2012 at the Waldmannhalle in Baar, Switzerland. This marked the first time the event was held outside of Germany. The second part of the competition was held on Sunday, 1 April at the Reichswald-Sporthalle in Ramstein, Germany.

Day 1 Results
Rank	Nation	Athletes	Points
1	Germany	Robert Maaser, Laura Stullich, Svenja Trepte, Christoph Clausen	24
2	Netherlands	Mariël Dekker, Myrna van Berkel, Boy Looijen, Martine v.d. Boogaard	18
3	Japan	Sarasa Mori, Motonobu Tamura, Shadai Wakuta, Aya Horiguchi	17
4	Switzerland	Cheyenne Rechsteiner, Remo Meyer, Edwina Huber, Tiziana Scherer	15

Day 2 Results
Rank	Nation
1	Germany
2	Japan
3	Netherlands
4	Switzerland

== 2010 ==
The 5th Team World Cup was held on 28 March 2010 in Finnentrop, Germany.

Results
Rank	Nation	Athletes	Points
1	Germany	Christoph Clausen, Julia Pohling, Robert Maaser, Svenja Trepte	28
2	Japan	Motonobu Tamura, Ichiro Fukuhara, Yasuhiko Takahashi, Daisuke Mori	18
3	Netherlands	Boy Looijen, Mariël Dekker, Kirstin Heerdink, Jeroen de Bruin	14
4	Switzerland	Vroni Kostezer, Remo Meyer, Tiziana Scherer, Stefanie Stutz	12

== 2008 ==
The 4th Team World Cup took place on 15 March 2008 in Wolfstein, Germany, and on 16 March 2008 in Ramstein-Miesenbach, Germany. It was the first edition in which teams could play a joker card to double their points scored in a round.

Results
Rank	Nation	Athletes	Part 1	Part 2	Total
1	Germany	Janin Oer, Annette Pusch, Constantin Malchin, Nadine Münster	24	25	49
2	All-Star Team	Vincent Klimo (Austria), Solveig Krapf (Norway), Sabine Krumm (Switzerland), Cécile Meschberger (Switzerland), Nina Nickel	18	16	34
3	Japan	Shinichiro Goeku, Kinji Furuya, Daisuke Mori, Kazuya Ezuka	16	16	32
3	Netherlands	Leonard Bakker, Kirstin Heerdink, Jeroen de Bruin, Rick de Boer	17	15	32

== 2006 ==
The 3rd Team World Cup took place on 8 April 2006 in Flensburg, Germany, and on 9 April 2006 in Trappenkamp, Germany. A new judging system for vault was introduced, alongside the round-by-round point system rather than counting total execution scores.

Results
Rank	Nation	Athletes	Part 1	Part 2	Total
1	Germany	Achus Emeis, Constantin Malchin, Janin Oer, Julius Petri	19	20	39
2	All-Star Team	Christoph Clausen, Tim Seidel, Cornelia Kranzi, Linde Wester	14	11	25
3	Japan	Shigeo Nomi, Takako Hiwa, Yoichi Matsumoto, Yukako Fukase	13	11	24
4	Switzerland	Vroni Kostezer, Cécile Meschberger, Daniel Roos, Christel Ischi	9	13	22

== 2004 ==
The 2nd Team World Cup was held on 3 and 4 April 2004 in Leverkusen and Wiesbaden, Germany.

Results
Rank	Nation	Athletes	Part 1	Part 2	Total
1	Germany	Janin Oer, Julius Petri, Julia Pohling, Jan Schäfer	64.35		
2	All-Star Team	Claudia Schäfer, Freddy Bruell, Jermain Dotson, Lisa Buddrus	58.50		
3	Japan	Atsuko Motoya, Satoshi Motoya, Yasuaki Yoshikawa, Takako Hiwa	58.20		
4	Switzerland	Cécile Meschberger, Claudine Müller, Flavian Graber, Jasmin Braunwalder	49.75		
5	Norway	Hildegunn Solgaard, Nora Boldermo, Charlotte Ostlie, Anne Roer Walland	47.50		

== 2002 ==
The inaugural Team World Cup took place on 23 March 2002 in Würzburg, Germany.

Results
Rank	Nation	Athletes	Points
1	Germany	Jeanette Groschup, Jan Schäfer, Julia Pohling, Linda Eitelwein	51.95
2	Japan	Satoshi Motoya, Takako Hiwa, Yohei Nishii, Atsuka Wakayama	48.05
3	Norway	Lena Bertelsen, Trude Linvolden, Lin-Veronica Samuelsen, Hildegunn Solgaard	46.70
4	All-Star Team	Paulo Lucena Silva, Jermaine Dotson, Thérèse Verdoorn, Maarten van Stekelenburg	44.80
5	Switzerland	Claudine Müller, Cécile Meschberger, Jasmin Braunwalder, Luzian Graber	43.65
