= Wheel Gymnastics World Championships =

The Wheel Gymnastics World Championships are the biennial world championship competitions in wheel gymnastics and Cyr wheel, organized by the International Wheel Gymnastics Federation (IRV).

== 2026 World Championships ==
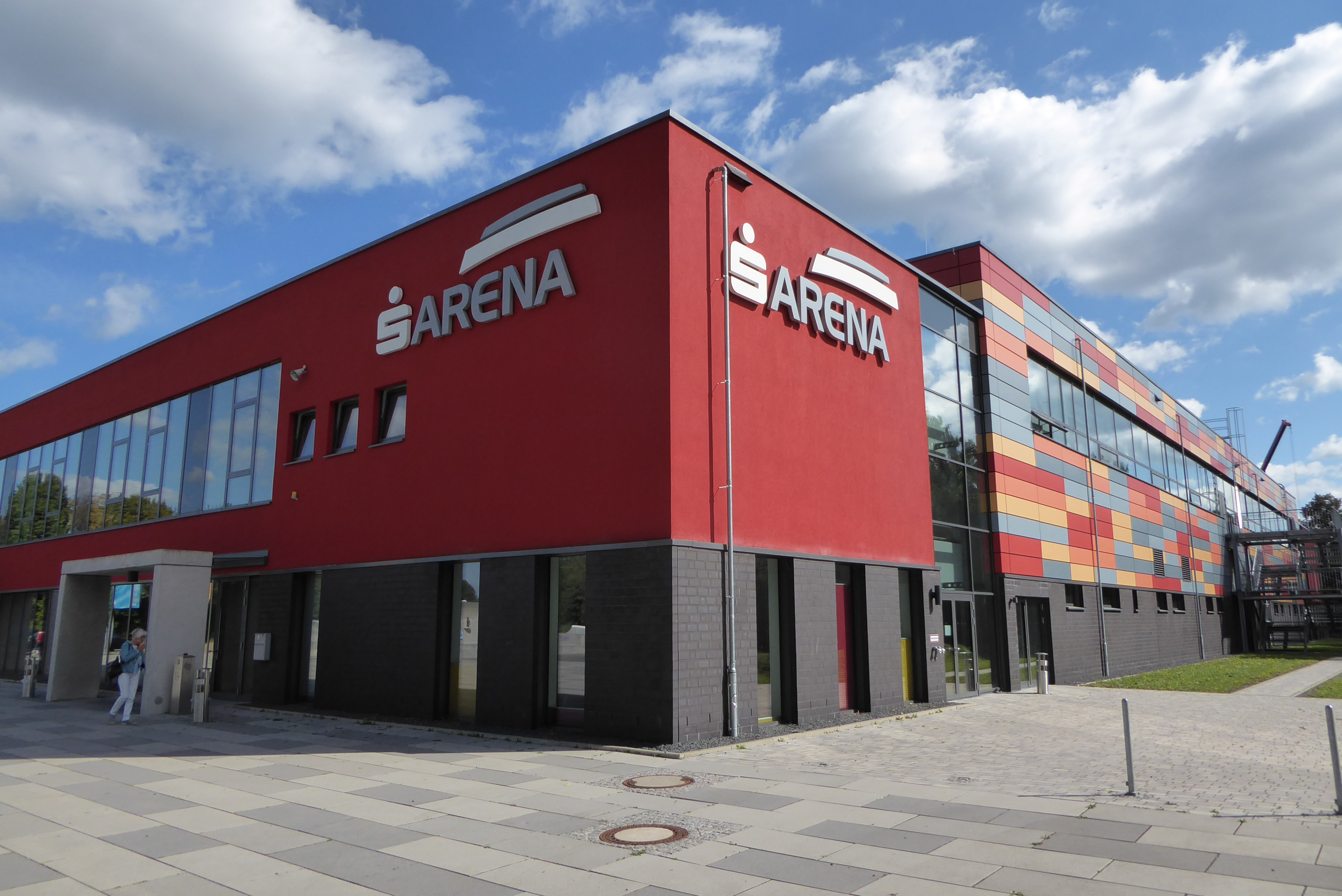
Sparkassen-Arena in Göttingen

The 16th Wheel Gymnastics World Championships took place from 29 June to 5 July 2026 at the Sparkassen-Arena in Göttingen, Germany. Göttingen won the hosting bid against Boston, United States. A total of 150 participants from 17 nations competed, with Finland, India, and Greece participating for the first time. Host nation Germany provided the largest delegation with 30 athletes and finished atop the medal count.

Germany, Israel, Switzerland, and the Netherlands qualified for the 2027 Team World Cup in Salzburg, Austria, alongside host nation Austria.

=== Schedule ===
Monday 29 June	IRV General Assembly
Tuesday 30 June	Opening Ceremony
Wednesday 1 July	Wheel Gymnastics Semi-Finals (Senior Men & Women)
Thursday 2 July	Wheel Gymnastics Semi-Finals (Junior Boys & Girls); Cyr Wheel All-Around Finals
Friday 3 July	Wheel Gymnastics All-Around Finals; Cyr Wheel Battle
Saturday 4 July	Wheel Gymnastics Individual Discipline Finals

=== Senior Results ===
==== Women ====
All-Around
Rank	Nation	Athlete	Straight Line	Spiral	Vault	Total
1	Germany	Sophie Julius	15.700	18.350	14.250	48.300
2	Germany	Karina Peisker	17.075	17.650	12.600	47.325
3	Austria	Malena Kernacs	16.875	17.250	13.100	47.325

Straight Line
Rank	Nation	Athlete	Score
1	Germany	Karina Peisker	17.550
2	Netherlands	Marinde Smolders	16.825
3	Austria	Malena Kernacs	16.750

Spiral
Rank	Nation	Athlete	Score
1	Germany	Sophie Julius	17.700
2	Switzerland	Cheyenne Rechsteiner	17.350
3	Germany	Karina Peisker	17.300

Vault
Rank	Nation	Athlete	Score
1	Japan	Sarina Hagiwara	14.150
2	Netherlands / Germany	Marjet Waldram / Sophie Julius	13.750

==== Men ====
All-Around
Rank	Nation	Athlete	Straight Line	Spiral	Vault	Total
1	Switzerland	Simon Rufener	17.100	17.450	14.700	49.250
2	Netherlands	Gabriël Lomans	17.100	15.050	15.300	47.450
3	Germany	Johannes Stolper	16.900	16.950	12.700	46.550

Straight Line
Rank	Nation	Athlete	Score
1	Switzerland	Simon Rufener	17.100
2	Germany	Johannes Stolper	17.075
3	Netherlands	Gabriël Lomans	16.450

Spiral
Rank	Nation	Athlete	Score
1	Switzerland	Simon Rufener	18.100
2	Germany	Johannes Stolper	17.850
3	Netherlands	Gabriël Lomans	17.100

Vault
Rank	Nation	Athlete	Score
1	Japan	Ryuichi Goto	16.400
2	Switzerland	Manuel Roth	15.700
3	Netherlands	Gabriël Lomans	15.300

=== Junior Results ===
==== Junior Girls ====
All-Around
Rank	Nation	Athlete	Straight Line	Spiral	Vault	Total
1	Israel	Bar Dubinsky	17.200	17.950	16.250	51.400
2	Germany	Maria Kaas	17.250	17.500	15.050	49.800
3	Israel	Gali Yarsky	16.450	16.150	15.750	48.350

Straight Line
Rank	Nation	Athlete	Score
1	Switzerland / Israel	Elea Peter / Bar Dubinsky	17.300
3	Germany	Maria Kaas	17.200

Spiral
Rank	Nation	Athlete	Score
1	Germany	Maria Kaas	17.250
2	Israel	Naomi Livne	17.050
3	Switzerland	Meret Stark	16.900

Vault
Rank	Nation	Athlete	Score
1	Israel	Bar Dubinsky	16.500
2	Germany	Maria Kaas	15.450
3	Switzerland	Olivia Notter	15.400

==== Junior Boys ====
All-Around
Rank	Nation	Athlete	Straight Line	Spiral	Vault	Total
1	Israel	Alon Havoinik	16.300	16.000	15.050	47.350
2	Germany	Hendrik Oer	15.850	15.800	15.450	47.100
3	Germany	Maximilian Heinze	16.300	15.650	14.700	46.650

Straight Line
Rank	Nation	Athlete	Score
1	Israel	Alon Havoinik	17.200
2	Switzerland	Timon Peter	16.800
3	Germany	Maximilian Heinze	16.200

Spiral
Rank	Nation	Athlete	Score
1	Israel	Alon Havoinik	16.400
2	Germany	Hendrik Oer	15.500
3	Germany	Nils Münster	15.200

Vault
Rank	Nation	Athlete	Score
1	Netherlands	Aquila Ziddah	15.800
2	Germany	Hendrik Oer	15.500
3	Switzerland / Germany	Timon Peter / Maximilian Heinze	15.050

== 2024 World Championships ==
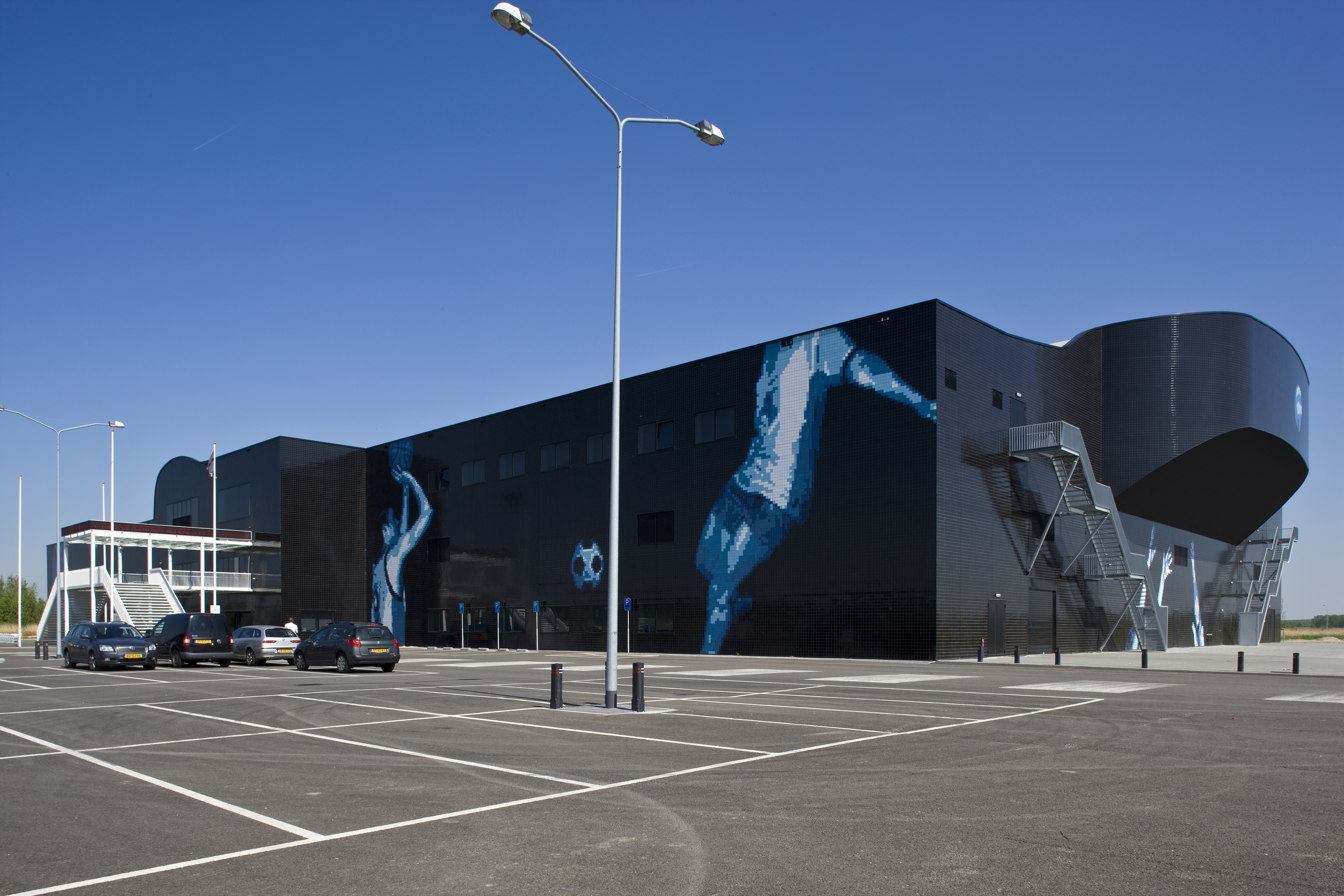
Topsportcentrum Almere

The 15th Wheel Gymnastics World Championships were held from 28 July to 4 August 2024 at the Topsportcentrum Almere in Almere, Netherlands. Gymnasts from 13 nations participated: Germany, Switzerland, Austria, Belgium, Israel, Spain, England, Norway, Denmark, Japan, Hungary, the United States, and host nation Netherlands.

Patrick Møller won Denmark's first-ever world championship title. During the IRV General Assembly held alongside the event, Mathias Reich was elected as the new IRV President.

The top four nations in the senior division (Germany, Japan, Switzerland, and Austria) and the junior division (Israel, Germany, Switzerland, and Belgium) qualified for the 2025 Team World Cup.

=== Schedule ===
Monday 29 July	Training & IRV General Assembly
Tuesday 30 July	Training & Opening Ceremony
Wednesday 31 July	Qualifications (Senior Men & Women)
Thursday 1 August	Qualifications (Junior Boys & Girls) & Cyr Wheel All-Around Finals
Friday 2 August	All-Around Finals & Cyr Wheel Battle
Saturday 3 August	Individual Discipline Finals

=== Cyr Wheel Results ===
==== Women ====
Women's Cyr Wheel
Rank	Nation	Athlete	Routine 1	Routine 2	Total
1	Spain	Lea Toran Jenner	12.600	11.850	24.450
2	Germany	Sandra Heidingsfelder	11.750	12.275	24.025
3	Austria	Ingrid Vukusic	10.600	11.850	22.450

==== Men ====
Men's Cyr Wheel
Rank	Nation	Athlete	Routine 1	Routine 2	Total
1	Japan	Shigeki Kanai	10.600	9.275	19.875
2	Germany	Hauke Narten	13.150	4.050	17.200
3	United States	Cyrus Luciano	4.750	4.000	8.750

=== Senior Wheel Gymnastics Results ===
==== Women ====
All-Around
Rank	Nation	Athlete	Straight Line	Spiral	Vault	Total
1	Germany	Kira Homeyer	17.280	15.550	15.400	48.225
2	Switzerland	Cheyenne Rechsteiner	17.150	16.300	14.400	47.850
3	Germany	Ella Sophie Köhler	16.430	14.800	16.350	47.575

Straight Line
Rank	Nation	Athlete	Score
1	Germany	Kira Homeyer	17.175
2	Switzerland	Cheyenne Rechsteiner	17.075
3	Austria	Malena Kernacs	16.825

Spiral
Rank	Nation	Athlete	Score
1	Switzerland	Cheyenne Rechsteiner	17.250
2	Austria	Malena Kernacs	17.050
3	Germany	Kira Homeyer	16.350

Vault
Rank	Nation	Athlete	Score
1	Israel	Inbar Armoni	17.000
2	Germany	Ella Sophie Köhler	16.450
3	Netherlands	Marjet Waldram	15.050

==== Men ====
All-Around
Rank	Nation	Athlete	Total
1	Switzerland	Simon Rufener	47.550
2	Germany	Johannes Stolper	46.450
3	Netherlands	Gabriël Lomans	44.950

Straight Line
Rank	Nation	Athlete	Score
1	Switzerland	Simon Rufener	17.325
2	Germany	Johannes Stolper	17.025
3	Netherlands	Gabriël Lomans	16.600

Spiral
Rank	Nation	Athlete	Score
1	Germany	Johannes Stolper	16.100
2	Switzerland / Germany	Simon Rufener / Nicolai Ruschmeyer	14.000

Vault
Rank	Nation	Athlete	Score
1	Japan	Ryuichi Goto	18.300
2	Israel	Uri Porat	17.800
3	Netherlands	Gabriël Lomans	16.400

=== Junior Wheel Gymnastics Results ===
==== Junior Girls ====
All-Around
Rank	Nation	Athlete	Straight Line	Spiral	Vault	Total
1	Germany	Sophie Julius	16.750	15.250	14.850	46.850
2	Israel	Hadas Nir	16.850	14.250	14.850	45.950
3	Israel	Bar Dubinsky	15.250	12.800	16.000	44.050

Straight Line
Rank	Nation	Athlete	Score
1	Germany	Annika Wasmuth	17.200
2	Israel	Bar Dubinsky	17.150
3	Germany	Frieda Wilke	17.100

Spiral
Rank	Nation	Athlete	Score
1	Germany	Frieda Wilke	15.100
2	Israel	Naomi Livne	14.750
3	Israel	Hadas Nir	13.950

Vault
Rank	Nation	Athlete	Score
1	Israel	Bar Dubinsky	16.200
2	Germany	Mia Sophie Schmidt	16.050
3	Germany	Sophie Julius	15.600

==== Junior Boys ====
All-Around
Rank	Nation	Athlete	Straight Line	Spiral	Vault	Total
1	Switzerland	Timon Peter	16.800	10.950	15.750	43.500
2	Netherlands	Aquila Ziddah	13.550	11.600	16.100	41.250
3	Germany	Bero Schröter	15.000	11.450	14.600	41.050

Straight Line
Rank	Nation	Athlete	Score
1	Switzerland	Timon Peter	16.650
2	Germany	Jamal Kiel	16.350
3	Netherlands	Robinjo van Stokrom	15.500

Spiral
Rank	Nation	Athlete	Score
1	Denmark	Patrick Møller	11.900
2	Netherlands	Aquila Ziddah	11.150
3	Germany	Nils Münster	10.800

Vault
Rank	Nation	Athlete	Score
1	Netherlands	Aquila Ziddah	16.150
2	Switzerland	Timon Peter	15.650
3	United States	Aidan Lish	15.400

== 2022 World Championships ==
The 14th Wheel Gymnastics World Championships took place from 23 to 28 May 2022 at the Humlehøj Hall in Sønderborg, Denmark. It was the first time Denmark hosted the World Championships. The event was organized by the IRV and TS Sønderborg, and marked the introduction of the new "Code of Points" rules framework. It was also the first World Championship since the cancellation of the 2021 event due to the COVID-19 pandemic. A total of 93 athletes from 13 nations competed. Germany won 26 out of 54 total medals. Admission was mostly free to promote the sport to the public.

=== Schedule ===
Monday	Training & Opening Ceremony
Tuesday	Training & IRV General Assembly
Wednesday	Senior Qualifications
Thursday	Junior Qualifications
Friday	All-Around Finals (Juniors & Seniors)
Saturday	Individual Discipline Finals (Juniors & Seniors)

=== Senior Results ===
==== Men ====
Straight Line
Rank	Nation	Athlete	Score
1	Switzerland	Simon Rufener	11.50
2	Japan	Yasuhiko Takahashi	11.25
3	Germany	Luca Christ	10.95

Spiral
Rank	Nation	Athlete	Score
1	Germany	Malte Schröder	11.00
2	Germany	Johannes Stolper	10.90
3	Switzerland	Simon Rufener	10.65

Vault
Rank	Nation	Athlete	Score
1	Japan	Ryuichi Goto	10.50
2	Germany	Malte Schröder	10.45
3	Japan	Yasuhiko Takahashi	10.20

All-Around
Rank	Nation	Athlete	Score
1	Switzerland	Simon Rufener	30.55
2	Japan	Yasuhiko Takahashi	30.25
3	Germany	Malte Schröder	29.35

==== Women ====
Straight Line
Rank	Nation	Athlete	Score
1	Austria / Japan / Germany	Birgit Halwachs / Aya Horiguchi / Karina Peisker	11.50

Spiral
Rank	Nation	Athlete	Score
1	Germany	Lilia Lessel	11.50
2	Austria	Birgit Halwachs	11.35
3	Germany	Isabel Pietro	11.10

Vault
Rank	Nation	Athlete	Score
1	Germany	Sarah Metz	7.80
2	Switzerland	Chiara Lenzo	7.65
3	Germany	Karina Peisker	7.45

All-Around
Rank	Nation	Athlete	Score
1	Germany	Karina Peisker	29.90
2	Germany	Lilia Lessel	29.75
3	Austria	Malena Kernacs	29.65

=== Junior Results ===
==== Junior Girls ====
Straight Line
Rank	Nation	Athlete	Score
1	Germany	Lea Gmeiner	12.00
2	Israel	Klil Benori	11.75
3	Germany	Ella Köhler	11.55

Spiral
Rank	Nation	Athlete	Score
1	Germany	Emma Gerlitz	10.90
2	Germany	Ella Köhler	10.10
3	Israel	Klil Benori	9.60

Vault
Rank	Nation	Athlete	Score
1	Germany	Mia Schmidt	8.25
2	Switzerland	Cheyenne Wietlisbach	7.60
3	Israel	Maayan Kiesler	7.35

All-Around
Rank	Nation	Athlete	Score
1	Germany	Emma Gerlitz	30.30
2	Germany	Lea Gmeiner	29.05
3	Israel	Klil Benori	27.70

==== Junior Boys ====
Straight Line
Rank	Nation	Athlete	Score
1	Israel	Ohad Madlal	11.65
2	Switzerland	Laurin Gerber	9.55
3	Israel	Uri Porat	9.35

Spiral
Rank	Nation	Athlete	Score
1	Germany	Jamal Kiel	8.25
2	Israel	Ohad Madlal	7.85
3	Ghana	Aquila Ziddah	6.10

Vault
Rank	Nation	Athlete	Score
1	Israel	Uri Porat	8.60
2	Israel	Ohad Madlal	8.15
3	Switzerland / Germany	Laurin Gerber / Jamal Kiel	6.70

All-Around
Rank	Nation	Athlete	Score
1	Israel	Ohad Madlal	28.45
2	Israel	Uri Porat	24.55
3	Germany	Jamal Kiel	23.10
