= Wheel gymnastics in Switzerland =

Wheel gymnastics has been practiced in Switzerland since the 1980s. The country has produced multiple world champions in the sport.

== History ==
Wheel gymnastics has been practiced in Switzerland since the 1980s, when the first competitions were also held in the country. The "Gymnaestrada 1982", held in Zürich, provided the foundation for international cooperation in wheel gymnastics. In 1992, the first European Championships were held in Liestal. Switzerland is also a co-founder of the International Wheel Gymnastics Federation (IRV), which was established in 1995 and is headquartered in Bern.

Switzerland hosted the 4th World Championships in Liestal in 2004, followed by the 8th edition in Baar in 2009, and the 13th edition in Magglingen in 2018.

== Rhönradswiss ==
"Rhönradswiss" is the national governing body for wheel gymnastics in Switzerland. It coordinates and organizes the sport nationally.

=== National Squad ===
Rhönradswiss supports athletes in competitive sport through its national squad, which is divided into Squad A (higher performance) and Squad B (lower performance). Squad members train together across four different weekends throughout the year.

== Competition system ==
Switzerland utilizes its own competition system for national events, while routines and vaults are scored according to the international "Code of Points" set by the IRV. National competitions feature five performance levels: Level Basic, Level 1, Level 2, Level 3, and Level Elite.

In Level Basic, gymnasts are restricted to elements with a maximum difficulty rating of A (0.2); Level 1 allows elements up to difficulty B (0.4), and so forth. In addition to the three individual disciplines (straight line, spiral, and vault), Level Elite offers an all-around competition, where scores from all three disciplines are combined. Gymnasts may select their level regardless of age and gender. Prior to 2018, categories were divided by gender and age group (e.g., Juniors, Youth Male/Female, Adults Male/Female).

The national season includes the following annual competitions:

- Herbstpokal (October, Zürich-Affoltern)
- Chlauscup (December, Untersiggenthal)
- Baselbietercup (January, Hölstein)
- Breitlicup (March, Buochs)
- Schachen Cup (May, Bonstetten)

=== Swiss Championships ===
Gymnasts can qualify for the Swiss Championships (held in March/April) through performance at the four qualification events. The championships are held at a different location each year, including the 2026 event held in Baar on May 3, 2026.

Swiss Champions 2026
	Level 1	Level 2	Level 3	Level Elite Youth	Level Elite Senior
Straight Line	Ayana Thaler	Lea Karli	Amelie Stiefmeier	Nadine Kamm	–
Straight Line w. Music	–	Siria Suter	Timon Peter	–	Cheyenne Rechsteiner
Spiral	Xenia Bötschi	Valeria Murer	Mena Kobler	Nadine Kamm	Cheyenne Rechsteiner
Vault	Kim Fornallaz	Lena Itin	Xenia Bötschi	Timon Peter	Manuel Roth
All-Around	–	–	–	Timon Peter Nadine Kamm	Cheyenne Rechsteiner Simon Rufener

== International achievements ==
=== Team World Championship ===
Switzerland qualified for the 2026 Team World Championship in Salzburg based on its performance at the World Championships.

Year	Juniors	Seniors
2025	1st Place	4th Place
2023	3rd Place	2nd Place
2019	–	3rd Place
2017	–	1st Place
2014	–	2nd Place
2012	–	4th Place
2010	–	4th Place
2006	–	4th Place
2004	–	4th Place
2002	–	5th Place

=== World Champions ===
- Cécile Meschberger: Straight Line (2007)
- Cheyenne Rechsteiner: Straight Line (2015), Spiral (2018, 2024)
- Simon Rufener: Straight Line (2022, 2024, 2026), All-Around (2022, 2024, 2026), Spiral (2026)
- Timon Peter: Straight Line (2024), All-Around (2024)
- Elea Peter: Straight Line (2026)
