= Homeyer =

Homeyer is a German surname. Notable people with the surname include:

- Alexander von Homeyer (1834–1903), German soldier and ornithologist
- Eugen Ferdinand von Homeyer (1809–1889), German ornithologist
- Fred J. Homeyer (1913–1990), justice of the South Dakota Supreme Court
- Henry Homeyer (fl. 2000s–2010s), American gardening author
- Hilary Homeyer, maiden name of Hilary Lunke (born 1979), American golfer
- Josef Homeyer (1929–2010), German Roman-catholic Bishop
- Karl Gustav Homeyer (1795–1847), German jurist
- Katja Homeyer (born 1969), German wheel gymnast
- Kira Homeyer (born 1998), German wheel gymnast
- Paul Homeyer (1853–1908), German organist

== See also ==
- Homeier
- Homeyer Verlag Leipzig, a German publishing house
