= Katja Homeyer =

- Full name: Katja Homeyer
- Born: 1969 (age 56–57)

Gymnastics career
- Discipline: Wheel gymnastics
- Country represented: Germany
- Club: TSV Bleidenstadt, SV Neuhof
Medal record
Women's wheel gymnastics
Representing Germany
World Championships
Gold medal – first place	1999 Limburg	Straight line
Gold medal – first place	1999 Limburg	Team
Silver medal – second place	1997 Antwerp	Spiral
Silver medal – second place	1999 Limburg	Spiral
European Championships
Gold medal – first place	1992 Cosenza	Spirale
Gold medal – first place	1992 Cosenza	Straight line

Katja Homeyer (born 1969) is a German wheel gymnast, coach, and sports official. She won national, European, and World Championship titles during her athletic career.

== Athletic career ==
Homeyer began practicing wheel gymnastics at the age of twelve and concluded her competitive career in 1999.

Her first big success was in 1987, she placed third at the German Junior Championships.

Between 1990 and 1994 she became multiple time European Champion.

Between 1995 and 1999, she won multiple World Championship gold and silver medals:

- 1997 in Antwerp, Belgium: World silver medalist in spiral
- 1999 in Limburg an der Lahn, Germany: World champion in straight line and team; World silver medalist in spiral

== Coaching career ==
Homeyer has served as a coach at both the local and national levels, including for:

- TSV Bleidenstadt in Taunusstein
- The German national team as head coach (Bundestrainerin)

In recognition of her dedication to elite sports, she was honored at the end of 2023 with the State of Hesse Sports Medal—the state’s highest sports award.

== Sports administration ==
Homeyer has held several administrative positions within sports organizations, including:

- Officer for high-performance and junior development in the German Gymnastics Federation (DTB)
- Member of the Athletes' Commission of the International Wheel Gymnastics Federation (2018 - 2024)

== Professional life ==
Homeyer is a primary school teacher and holds a degree in sports science. She serves on the management team of a primary school in Wiesbaden.

== Personal life ==
Together with Jürgen Bientzle, who is also active as a wheel gymnastics coach, Homeyer has children who are also national and international wheel gymnastics athletes: Kira Homeyer and Marvin Homeyer. Her youngest daughter, Finia, has qualified multiple times for the German Junior Championships. Multiple World, European, and German national champion Wolfgang Bientzle is her brother-in-law.
