= Norbert Dill =

- Full name: Norbert Emil Dill
- Born: December 21, 1938 Würzburg, Germany
- Died: February 27, 2021 (aged 82) San Pedro, California, United States

Gymnastics career
- Discipline: Wheel gymnastics
- Country represented: Germany
- Club: TG Würzburg 1848

Norbert Emil Dill (21 December 1938 – 27 February 2021) was a German wheel gymnast, entrepreneur, and sports official. He was a pioneer of wheel gymnastics in the United States.

== Career and life ==
Dill began practicing wheel gymnastics in Würzburg, Germany. Competing for TG Würzburg 1848, he won the Bavarian Championship title by a wide margin in 1958. When wheel gymnastics was officially integrated into the German Gymnastics Federation (Deutscher Turner-Bund) in 1959, national championships were established. Dill became the first German national champion in wheel gymnastics in 1960 in Hannover and defended his title at the second edition in 1962 in Berlin. He also won the first German National Team Champion competition in 1961.

In the early 1970’s, Dill emigrated to the United States, where he founded a gymnastics supply company Norbert's Athletic Products.

To increase public awareness of the sport, he made guest appearances on several US national television programs, including The Tonight Show, That's Incredible!, and The Guinness Game. Through his business and family initiatives starting in the 1970s, Dill actively promoted the development of wheel gymnastics in the US. These efforts laid the foundation for the creation of the USA Wheel Gymnastics Federation in 2011, the official national governing body for the sport in the United States.

Norbert Dill passed away on 27 February 2021 in San Pedro, California.

== Awards and honors ==
- 2013: Awarded the USAWGF Lifetime Achievement Award during the World Wheel Gymnastics Championships for his contributions to growing the sport in the United States.
- 2021: Posthumously inducted into the World Acrobatics Society (WAS) Hall of Fame and awarded the Golden Achievement Award.
