= Sophie Julius =

German wheel gymnast

- Full name: Sophie Julius

Gymnastics career
- Discipline: Wheel gymnastics
- Country represented: Germany
- Club: Magdeburger SV 90
Medal record
Women's wheel gymnastics
Representing Germany
World Championships
Gold medal – first place	2026 Göttingen	All-Around
Gold medal – first place	2026 Göttingen	Spiral
Silver medal – second place	2026 Göttingen	Vault
Junior World Championships
Gold medal – first place	2023 Chicago	Team
Gold medal – first place	2024 Almere	All-Around
Bronze medal – third place	2024 Almere	Vault

Sophie Julius is a German wheel gymnastics gymnast. She is a multiple-time world champion in wheel gymnastics, including the 2026 senior all-around world champion.

== Career ==
Sophie Julius trains at the Saxony-Anhalt state training center and competes for Magdeburger SV 90.

She achieved her first international success in the junior division: At the 2023 Junior Team World Championships in Chicago, she won the gold medal with the German team. At the 2024 Wheel Gymnastics World Championships in Almere, Netherlands, she secured the junior all-around world title with 46.850 points, as well as the bronze medal in vault.

After moving up to the senior division, she qualified for the World Championships through national qualification competitions in 2026. At the 2026 World Championships in Göttingen, Julius won the women's all-around gold medal with 48.300 points ahead of Karina Peisker. In the subsequent individual finals, she also secured the world title in spiral and the silver medal in vault.

== Achievements (Selected) ==
- 2023: Junior World Champion, Team (Chicago)
- 2024: Junior World Champion, All-around (Almere)
- 2024: 3rd place, Junior World Championships, Vault (Almere)
- 2026: World Champion, All-around (Göttingen)
- 2026: World Champion, Spiral (Göttingen)
- 2026: World Championship Vault (Göttingen)
