= International Wheel Gymnastics Federation =

- Internationaler Rhönradturnverband
- Abbreviation: IRV
- Formation: January 1995
- Purpose: Coordination of wheel gymnastics and cyr wheel
- Headquarters: Bern, Switzerland
- Website: wheelgymnastics.sport

The International Wheel Gymnastics Federation (IRV) is the international governing body for the sports of wheel gymnastics and cyr wheel. It was founded in January 1995 in Basel, Switzerland, and is currently headquartered in Bern.

== Members ==
Members include national sports governing bodies representing wheel gymnastics from the following countries:

- Germany (since 1995; Gold Member)
- Switzerland (since 1995; Gold Member)
- United States (since 2009; Gold Member)
- Japan (since 1995; Bronze Member)
- Netherlands (since 1995; Bronze Member)
- Austria (since 2003; Bronze Member)
- Israel (since 2012; Bronze Member)
- Colombia (since 2011; Bronze Member)
- Norway (since 1997; Bronze Member)
- Denmark (since 2015; Bronze Member)
- France (since 2024; Bronze Member)

== Activities ==
The IRV hosts all major international competitions, including the Team World Championships and the Wheel Gymnastics World Championships. The federation is also responsible for developing code of points rules, competition formats, training programs and training judges. Larger projects initiated by member countries are often supported financially. The IRV aims to promote wheel gymnastics and Cyr wheel globally with the long-term goal of becoming an Olympic sport.

== Athletes' Commission ==
The purpose of the Athletes' Commission (AC) is to gather and evaluate ideas, interests, and feedback from the wheel gymnastics community (athletes, coaches, judges, etc.) and present them to the IRV. The AC consists of a maximum of two Cyr wheel athletes, two German wheel athletes, and two coaches, elected by athletes and coaches during the World Championships. No more than two individuals from the same country may serve on the commission at the same time. Members serve until the following World Championships.

- 2026–2028: (Switzerland) Timon Peter, (Germany) Larissa von Behren, (Netherlands) Gabriël Lomans , (United States) Cyrus Luciano
- 2024–2026: (Switzerland) Simon Rufener, (Belgium) Achim Pitz, (Austria) Malena Kernacs, (United States) Cyrus Luciano
- 2022–2024: (Switzerland) Simon Rufener, (Germany) Katja Homeyer, (Germany) Isabel Pietro, (Japan) Shigeki Kanai
- 2020–2022: (Switzerland) Simon Rufener, (Germany) Katja Homeyer, (Germany) Svea Hünnig, (Japan) Yasuhiko Takahashi, (Israel) Tammi Livni
