= Robert Maaser =

German actor and wheel gymnast

Personal information
- Citizenship: German
- Born: July 19, 1990 (age 36) Strausberg, East Germany
- Education: Arturo Schauspielschule
- Occupations: Actor; wheel gymnast
- Years active: 2005–2013(athletics); 2014–present (acting)
- Spouse: Married
Medal record
Men's wheel gymnastics
Representing Germany
World Championships
Gold medal – first place	2005 Aachen	Straightline (Junior)
Gold medal – first place	2007 Salzburg	All-Around
Gold medal – first place	2007 Salzburg	Straightline
Gold medal – first place	2007 Salzburg	Spiral
Gold medal – first place	2007 Salzburg	Vault
Gold medal – first place	2013 Chicago	Cyr Wheel

Robert Maaser (born 19 July 1990 in Strausberg) is a German actor and multiple wheel gymnastics world champion.

== Life and career ==
At the age of nine, he got into wheel gymnastics through one of his older sisters and successfully participated in the 2005 Wheel Gymnastics World Championships, where he won the junior title in straightline. At the World Championships in 2007, he won four individual titles, accumulating a total of fourteen world titles over the course of his athletic career. He completed his Abitur in 2009.

In 2010, he competed in Das Supertalent (the German adaptation of the Got Talent franchise), reaching the semi-finals. Between 2011 and 2018, he completed various acting programs and coaching courses, including at the Arturo Schauspielschule in Cologne in 2011 and at the Actor's Space Berlin in 2013. In 2013, Maaser competed for the first time in the Cyr wheel World Championships and won the world title. In 2015, he played a supporting role in the film Mission: Impossible – Rogue Nation. In 2017, he portrayed the macho extreme sports athlete Tim Hayer in the daily soap Alles was zählt.

Robert Maaser is married and lives in Berlin.

== Filmography (Selection) ==
=== Television series ===
- 2014: Gute Zeiten, schlechte Zeiten (one episode)
- 2016: Einsatz in Köln – Die Kommissare (one episode)
- 2016: Tempel (one episode)
- 2017: Alles was zählt (101 episodes)
- 2017: Notruf Hafenkante (one episode)
- 2017: Sense8 (two episodes)
- 2017: You Are Wanted (one episode)
- 2018: Alarm für Cobra 11 (one episode)
- 2019: SOKO Köln (one episode)
- 2019: F4LKENB3RG – Mord im Internat?
- 2021: Tribes of Europa
- 2021: Der Palast
- 2021: Blutige Anfänger (12 episodes)
- 2021: Schneller als die Angst
- 2024: Where's Wanda? (two episodes)
- 2025: The Black Dagger Brotherhood (2025-Present)

=== Film ===
- 2015: Mission: Impossible – Rogue Nation
- 2015: Kommissar Marthaler – Engel des Todes
- 2016: Allein gegen die Zeit – Der Film
- 2016: Shivaay
- 2016: Tiger Girl
- 2016: Tschiller: Off Duty
- 2016: Unsere Zeit ist jetzt
- 2017: 2Close2U
- 2017: Immigration Game
- 2017: Rettet die Arier! (Short film)
- 2018: Ronny & Klaid
- 2019: Charlie's Angels
- 2019: 1917
- 2019: Out for Vengeance
- 2019: Perception of Peace
- 2019: The Dare
- 2020: The Match
- 2022: Uncharted
- 2023: Blood & Gold
- 2023: The Machine
- 2025: From the World of John Wick: Ballerina
- 2026: Humint
