= Gyrowheel Monument =

Monument and memorial in Germany

Coordinates: 50.37958°N 10.10344°E

The Gyrowheel Monument in Schönau an der Brend, Bavaria, Germany, is a monument to the invention of the gym wheel by Otto Feick in 1926. It consists of an artificial stone hill with a gyrowheel on the top. Under the gyrowheel is a small fountain.

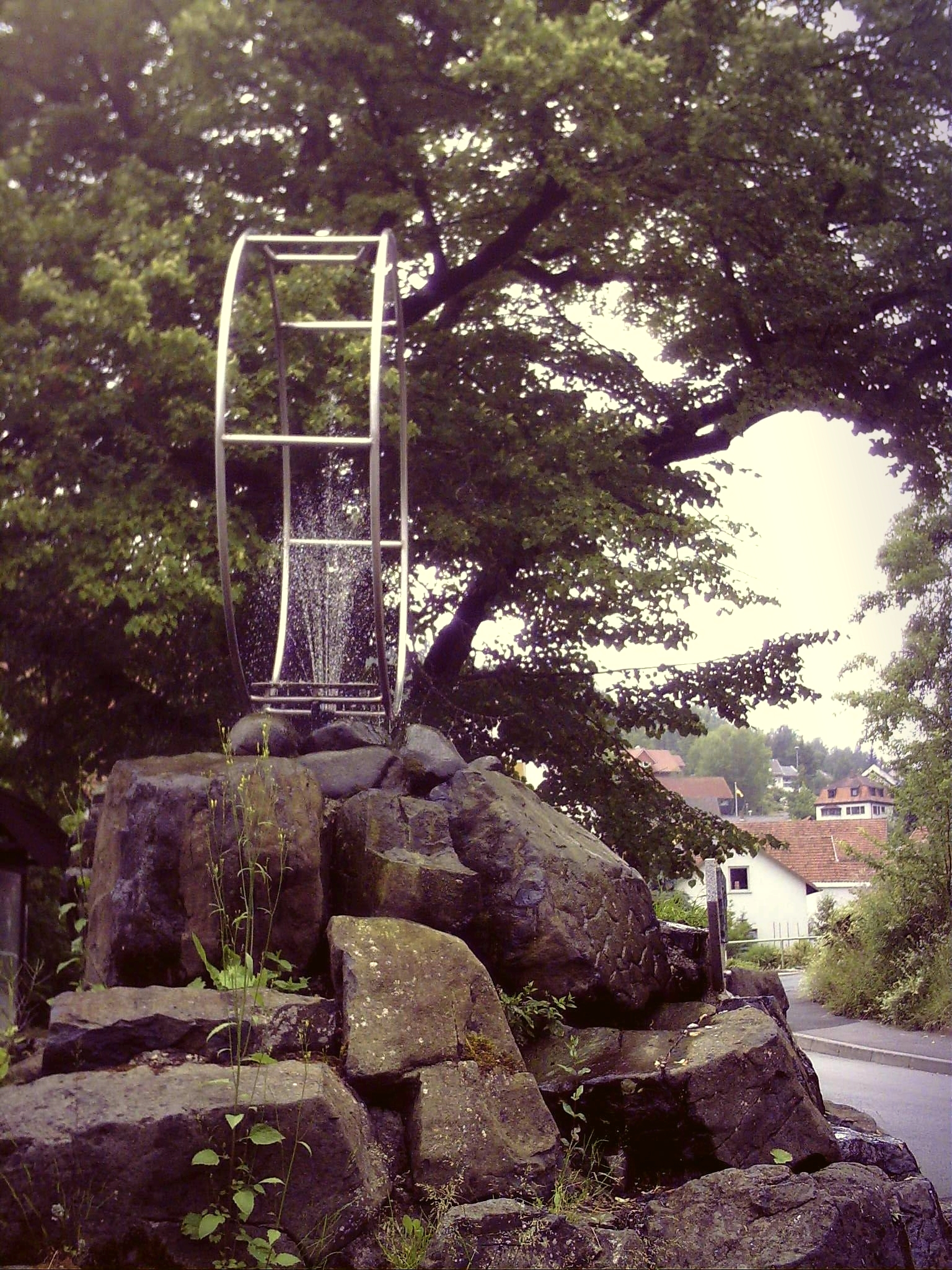
Gyrowheel Monument, Schönau an der Brend
