= Aquila Ziddah =

Dutch artistic and wheel gymnast

- Full name: Aquila Lennart Xose Ziddah
- Born: 11 June 2008 (age 18) Ede, Netherlands
- Height: 190 cm (6 ft 3 in)

Gymnastics career
- Discipline: Artistic and Wheel gymnastics
- Club: D.O.K. Ede
- Head coaches: Saskia van Bruxvoort (wheel gymnastics); Niels Velthuijs (artistic gymnastics)

Aquila Ziddah (born 11 June 2008) is a Dutch gymnast who competes in both artistic gymnastics and wheel gymnastics (Rhönradturnen).

Ziddah was born in Ede, Netherlands, to a Dutch mother and a Ghanaian father. He holds Dutch nationality and a Ghanaian passport. He is a student at HAN University of Applied Sciences in Arnhem/Nijmegen.

He began artistic gymnastics around 2012 and started wheel gymnastics in 2017.

== Career ==
=== Wheel gymnastics ===
Ziddah trains at gymnastiekvereniging D.O.K. Ede. His head coach for wheel gymnastics is Saskia van Bruxvoort.

He first represented Ghana at the 2022 World Championships in Sønderborg, Denmark, where he won the bronze medal in the junior spirals event.

Competing for the Netherlands, he became junior world champion on vault at the 2024 World Championships in Almere, also winning silver medals in the all-around and spirals.

At the 2026 World Championships in Göttingen he won gold on vault.

He is a multiple Dutch national champion in wheel gymnastics.

=== Artistic gymnastics ===
Ziddah started artistic gymnastics at G.V. Impuls. From 2017 he trained extra at C.G.V. D.O.K. Ede and fully moved to Exalto Sport in 2019. After Exalto Sport went bankrupt at the end of 2022, he returned to D.O.K. Ede with the men’s artistic gymnastics group. His coach for artistic gymnastics is Niels Velthuijs.

Notable results include third place at the Shock Cup Level 3 in 2025 and third place in the overall ranking of the 2025–2026 season (with a fourth place at the 2026 Ahoy Cup Level 3).

He continues to compete actively in both disciplines as a hybrid athlete.

== Competitive results ==
=== Wheel gymnastics ===
==== International results ====
Year	Competition	Event	Result
2022	World Championships (Sønderborg)	Junior Spirals	Bronze Bronze (for Ghana)
2024	World Championships (Almere)	Junior All-around	Silver Silver
2024	World Championships (Almere)	Junior Vault	Gold Gold
2024	World Championships (Almere)	Junior Spirals	Silver Silver
2026	World Championships (Göttingen)	Vault	Gold Gold

==== National results ====
Year	Competition	Event	Result
2023	Dutch National Championships	All-around	Gold Gold
2025	Dutch National Championships	All-around	Gold Gold
2025	Dutch National Championships	Vault	Gold Gold
2025	Dutch National Championships	Spiral	Gold Gold
2026	Dutch National Championships	All-around	Gold Gold
2026	Dutch National Championships	Vault	Gold Gold
2026	Dutch National Championships	Spiral	Gold Gold
2026	Dutch National Championships	Straight-line	Gold Gold

=== Artistic gymnastics ===
Year	Competition	Event	Result
2025	Ahoy Cup Level 3	All-around	Bronze 3rd (Bronze)
2026	Season ranking 2nd division	Overall	Bronze 3rd
2026	Ahoy Cup Level 3	All-around	4th
2025	Dutch National Championships (2nd division)	All-around	Bronze 3rd (Bronze)

== Personal life ==
He is 190 cm tall.
