= Marinde Smolders =

Dutch wheel gymnast

- Born: c. 2000

Gymnastics career
- Discipline: Wheel gymnastics
- Country represented: Netherlands
Medal record
Women's wheel gymnastics
Representing Netherlands
World Championships
Silver medal – second place	2026 Göttingen	Straight line
Junior World Championships
Bronze medal – third place	2018 Magglingen	Vault

Marinde Smolders (born c. 2000) is a Dutch wheel gymnast. She is a World Championship silver medalist in straight line (2026).

== Career ==
Smolders began her athletic career at age of five in classical artistic gymnastics. At age 13, she discovered wheel gymnastics and decided to switch sports.

She achieved international success in junior competitions: at the 2018 Junior World Championships in Magglingen, Switzerland, she won the bronze medal in vault.

Following high school, she began studying psychology at Erasmus University Rotterdam, where she was supported as a student-athlete through the university's Erasmus Sport program.

Smolders faced major health setbacks during her career. Roughly three years prior to the 2024 World Championships, she broke her ankle and tore ligaments, requiring a two-year rehabilitation period. In 2023, she successfully returned to active competition.

In 2024, she capped her comeback on the national stage by winning gold medals in both all-around and vault at the Dutch National Championships (NK). For her achievements, she was honored in her hometown of Krimpen aan den IJssel at the "Avond van de Sport". Later that year, she competed at the home World Championships in Almere, Netherlands.

At the 2026 World Championships in Göttingen, Smolders achieved her greatest senior success to date by winning the silver medal in the straight line final.
