= Homeier =

Homeier is a surname. Notable people with the surname include:

- Bill Homeier (1918–2001), American racing driver
- Merle Homeier (born 1999), German long jumper
- Skip Homeier (1930–2017), American actor

== See also ==
- Homeyer
