= Johannes Stolper =

German wheel gymnast

- Full name: Johannes Stolper
- Born: 2002 (age 23–24)

Gymnastics career
- Discipline: Wheel gymnastics
- Country represented: Germany
- Club: TSC Strausberg
Medal record
Men's wheel gymnastics
Representing Germany
World Championships
Silver medal – second place	2022 Sønderborg	Spiral
Gold medal – first place	2024 Almere	Spiral
Silver medal – second place	2024 Almere	All-Around
Silver medal – second place	2024 Almere	Straightline
Silver medal – second place	2026 Göttingen	Spiral
Silver medal – second place	2026 Göttingen	Straightline
Bronze medal – third place	2026 Göttingen	All-Around
Team World Championships
Gold medal – first place	2025 Leipzig	Team

Johannes Stolper (born 2002) is a German wheel gymnast. He is a multiple-time world champion and belongs to the A-squad of the German Gymnastics Federation (DTB).

== Athletic career ==
Stolper competes for TSC Strausberg in Brandenburg. He has been among the international elite in wheel gymnastics since the early 2020s. As early as 2021, he won the Team World Cup with the German team, which was held in a hybrid format due to pandemic restrictions.

At the 2023 German Championships, he won the title in the all-around as well as in all three individual finals (straightline, spiral, and vault). In 2025, he consolidated his status at the German Championships by again winning gold in spiral and the musical routine.

Stolper achieved his career highlight to date at the 2024 World Championships in Almere, Netherlands. There, he secured the world championship title in the spiral event with 16.10 points. He also won the silver medal in the all-around and the musical routine.

In June 2025, Stolper won the gold medal with the German national team at the Team World Championships in Leipzig, which took place as part of the international German Gymnastics Festival (Deutsches Turnfest).

At the 2026 World Championships, he achieved the world championship runner-up title in both spiral and straightline, narrowly behind Simon Rufener. Stolper secured the bronze medal in the all-around.

== Other activities ==
Since October 2025, Johannes Stolper has been a contact person for the SafeSport initiative within the wheel gymnastics division. He is currently studying to become a teacher at the Humboldt University of Berlin.
