= Marjet Waldram =

Dutch wheel gymnast

- Born: Grou, Netherlands

Gymnastics career
- Discipline: Wheel gymnastics
- Country represented: Netherlands
- Club: SSS-Grou
Medal record
Women's wheel gymnastics
Representing Netherlands
World Championships
Silver medal – second place	2026 Göttingen	Vault
Bronze medal – third place	2024 Almere	Vault

Marjet Waldram is a Dutch wheel gymnast. At the 2026 World Championships, she became the World Championship silver medalist in vault.

== Early life and career ==
Waldram is from Grou in the province of Friesland, where she started with wheel gymnastics at the age of 12. She competes for the gymnastics club SSS-Grou. Parallel to her athletic career, she studied nursing (Verpleegkunde) at NHL Stenden University of Applied Sciences.

She achieved national success in June 2017 when she won gold at the Dutch National Championships in Krimpen aan den IJssel. In the following years, she established herself among the top Dutch gymnasts and qualified for the 2020 Junior World Championships, which were subsequently canceled due to the COVID-19 pandemic.

Her World Championship debut took place at the 2022 World Championships in Sønderborg, Denmark. At the 2024 World Championships in Almere, Netherlands, she scored 15.05 points in the vault final to win the bronze medal.

At the 2026 World Championships in Göttingen, Germany, she qualified for the all-around final, placing sixth with 43.825 points. In the individual apparatus finals, she shared the silver medal in vault with Sophie Julius.
