= Otto Feick =

German inventor and gymnast (1890-1959)

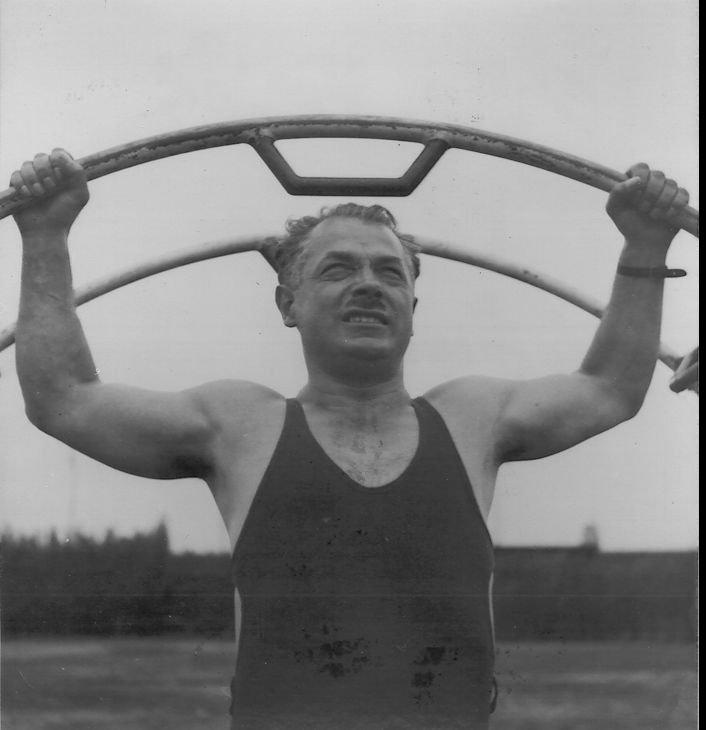
- Feick in 1932
- Born: 4 July 1890
- Died: 17 October 1959 (aged 69)
- Occupations: Inventor, gymnast

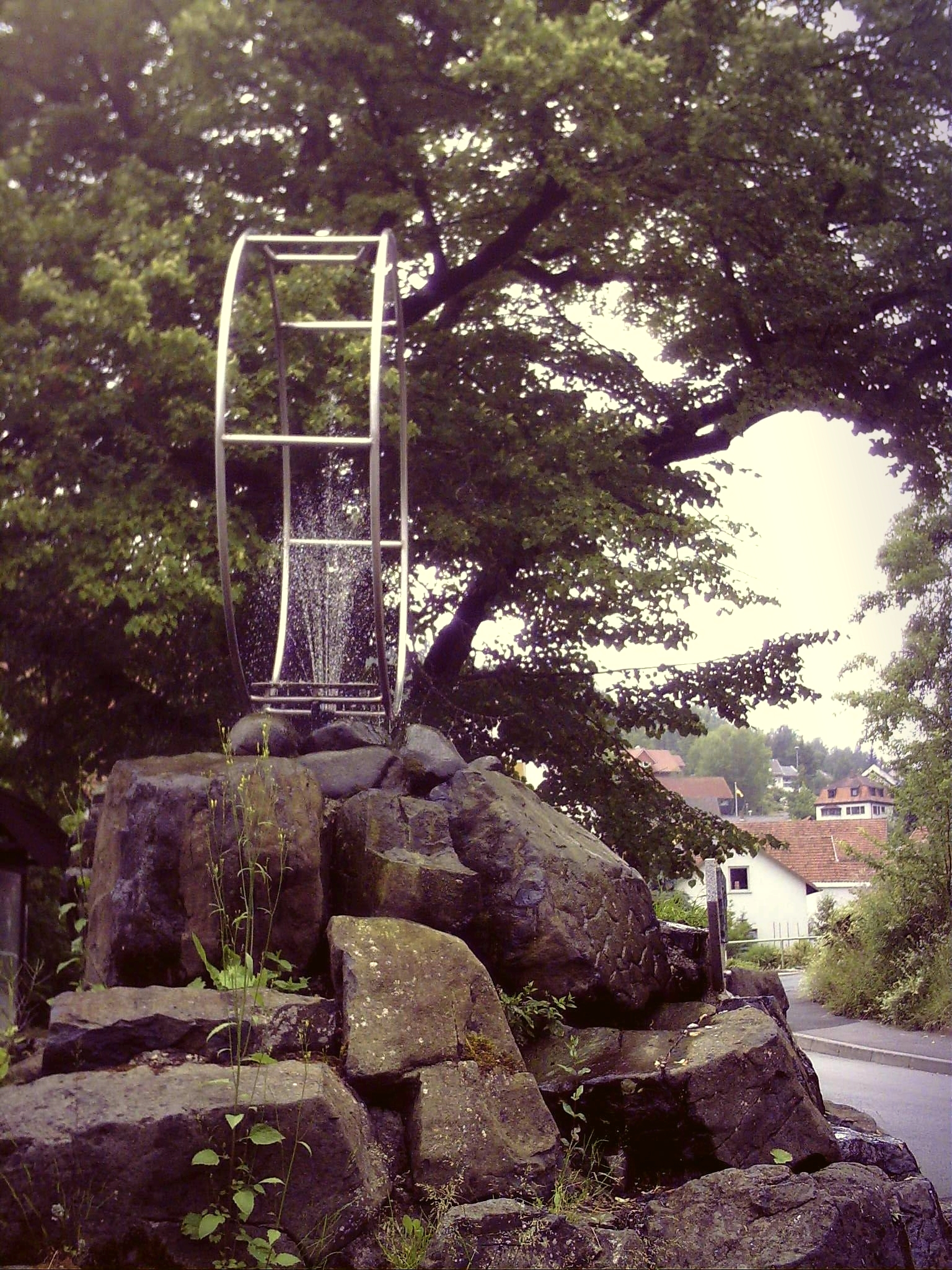
Monument in Schönau an der Brend to the invention of the Gyrowheel (gym wheel) by Otto Feick

Otto Feick (4 July 1890 in Reichenbach – 17 October 1959 in Schönau an der Brend) was a German inventor and gymnast.

== Biography ==
Feick was born in 1890, the son of a cooper. He worked as a locksmith and railwayman. Feick worked from 1914 to 1923 for Deutsche Reichsbahn in Ludwigshafen am Rhein. During this time he lived in Ludwigshafen-Gartenstadt. He was a supporter of the trade union movement and a member of the board of the railway workers union TRANSNET Gewerkschaft. In 1924/1925, Feick invented the gymnastics wheel or Rhönrad.

In 1921, Feick was charged with obstruction and subsequently put in jail by the French troops occupying the Palatinate. While he was in jail in Mainz, he recalled that during his childhood in Reichenbach, he had connected two iron hoops with cross-bars he had found in his grandfather's blacksmith's shop and used this construct to roll down the hill next to his parents' house. Feick then invented a prototype of the Rhönrad in Ludwigshafen. After his expulsion from the Palatinate by the French occupation forces in 1923, he moved to Schönau an der Brend, a town in the Rhön Mountains in Bavaria and his wife's hometown. He founded, with other acquaintances in Schönau, a metal workshop and produced game devices and bedsteads. He also applied for a patent from there, with a photo taken on the grounds of Volksgesundheit e.V. ("Public Health Club"), a sports club he had founded in Ludwigshafen in 1919, serving as the basis. He was awarded the patent for his invention on 8 November 1925. However, the name Rhönrad, named so in honor of his new home, was not registered until 1926. From 1925 to 1926, he developed a further variant of his invention in the Zieh- und Stanzwerk ("Drawing and Stamping Factory") in Niederscheden.

In 1927 he moved to Würzburg. He later moved back to Schönau an der Brend, where he died in poverty on 17 October 1959.

== Legacy ==
- In Schönau, a monument was erected to Feick and the gymnastics wheel.
- In Glan-Münchweiler, where Feick lived for several years, a monument in the form of a centrifugal Rhönrad was erected on the central island of a roundabout on Bundesstraße 423 in the Bettenhausen district.
