= Gabriël Lomans =

Dutch wheel gymnast

- Born: c. 2003

Gymnastics career
- Discipline: Wheel gymnastics
- Country represented: Netherlands
Medal record
Men's wheel gymnastics
Representing Netherlands
World Championships
Silver medal – second place	2026 Göttingen	All-around
Bronze medal – third place	2026 Göttingen	Straight line
Bronze medal – third place	2026 Göttingen	Spiral
Bronze medal – third place	2024 Almere	All-around
Bronze medal – third place	2024 Almere	Straight line
Bronze medal – third place	2024 Almere	Vault

Gabriël Lomans (born c. 2003) is a Dutch wheel gymnast. He is a multiple medalist at the World Championships.

== Career ==
After his debut in the World Championships 2022 he made his international breakthrough at the 2024 World Championships in Almere. Competing on home soil, he won the bronze medal in the men's all-around competition. In the apparatus finals, he secured two additional bronze medals in the straight line and vault disciplines. He also placed first at the Belgian Open .

At the 2026 World Championships in Göttingen, Lomans built on this success. He finished second in the all-around competition to claim the silver medal. In the individual finals, he completed his medal collection with two more bronze medals in spiral and straight line with his music routine to "Swan Lake".

He acts as an ambassador for his sport and has publicly expressed his ambition for wheel gymnastics to be included in the Olympic Games. In order to support the sport he also is active as a judge.
