= Henry Homeyer =

Henry Homeyer, known as “The Gardening Guy”, is an American freelance writer, author, garden designer, organic gardening educator, and consultant based in Cornish Flat, New Hampshire.

He is a University of New Hampshire Extension Master Gardener and writes a weekly gardening column for the Valley News (Lebanon, New Hampshire) and 11 other newspapers in Vermont, Maine, New Hampshire and Rhode Island. Homeyer is a regular commentator on gardening for Vermont Public Radio, and has taught organic and sustainable gardening at the college level.

== Biography ==
For 10 years, Homeyer was the Vermont/New Hampshire Associate Editor for People, Places and Plants magazine, and wrote gardening articles for The New York Times.

Homeyer's book, "Notes From The Garden", was listed in The Christian Science Monitor as "one of the year's best garden books".

In 2012, Homeyer published a children's book, "Wobar and the Quest for the Magic Calumet", a fantasy adventure about a boy born with a magical mustache and the ability to speak to animals. Reviews: Forward Magazine ForeWord Magazine, Valley News

== Books ==
- Notes From The Garden: Observations and Reflections from an Organic Gardener (University Press of New England, 2002)
- New Hampshire Gardener's Companion: Insider's Guide to Gardening in the Granite State (Globe-Pequot Press, 2005)
- The Vermont Gardener's Companion: Insider's Guide to Gardening in the Green Mountain State (Globe-Pequot Press, 2006)
- Organic Gardening (Not Just) In the Northeast: A Hands on Month-By-Month Guide (Bunker Hill Publishing, 2011)
- Wobar and the Quest for the Magic Calumet (Bunker Hill Publishing, 2012)
