= Cheyenne Rechsteiner =

Swiss wheel gymnast

- Full name: Cheyenne Rechsteiner
- Born: 1994 (age 31–32)

Gymnastics career
- Discipline: Wheel gymnastics
- Country represented: Switzerland
- Club: TV Liestal
Medal record
Women's wheel gymnastics
Representing Switzerland
World Championships
Bronze medal – third place	2011 Arnsberg	Straightline
Bronze medal – third place	2011 Arnsberg	Spiral
Silver medal – second place	2013 Chicago	Straightline
Bronze medal – third place	2013 Chicago	Spiral
Gold medal – first place	2015 Lignano	Straightline
Silver medal – second place	2015 Lignano	All-Around
Bronze medal – third place	2016 Cincinnati	Straightline
Bronze medal – third place	2016 Cincinnati	Spiral
Gold medal – first place	2018 Magglingen	Spiral
Silver medal – second place	2018 Magglingen	All-Around
Silver medal – second place	2018 Magglingen	Straightline
Gold medal – first place	2024 Almere	Spiral
Silver medal – second place	2024 Almere	All-Around
Silver medal – second place	2024 Almere	Straightline
Silver medal – second place	2026 Göttingen	Spiral
Team World Championships
Bronze medal – third place	2013 Chicago	Team
Bronze medal – third place	2015 Lignano	Team
Bronze medal – third place	2016 Cincinnati	Team
Silver medal – second place	2018 Magglingen	Team

Cheyenne Rechsteiner (born 1994) is a Swiss wheel gymnast with three individual world championship titles and numerous international medals.

== Life and career ==
Rechsteiner began wheel gymnastics in 2001 at the age of seven, after attending the opening ceremony of the 2001 Wheel Gymnastics World Championships in Liestal (Switzerland). She started her athletic career at SATUS TV Birsfelden and later moved to the club SATUS Züri 12 to train at an elite level.

She celebrated her first major international success in 2015 at the World Championships in Lignano Sabbiadoro (Italy), where she won gold in straightline and silver in the all-around. In 2018, she secured the title in the spiral discipline at the home World Championships in Magglingen (Switzerland).

After a five-year break from competition, during which she completed a PhD in biology in the US at the University of Rochester, she made a successful comeback in 2024. Despite challenging conditions—she trained in the US largely without a coach or teammates—she won gold in spiral and silver in the all-around at the 2024 Wheel Gymnastics World Championships in Almere. At the World Championships in 2026 in Göttingen, Rechsteiner claimed the vice world champion title in spiral. She also qualified for the finals in both all-around and straightline.

Rechsteiner competes for TV Liestal, where she is also active as a coach.

== Leadership and Official Activities ==
In addition to her active sports career, Rechsteiner is committed to the further development of her discipline. From 2022 to 2024, she held the position of Secretary General of the International Wheel Gymnastics Federation (IRV). Furthermore, she authored the textbook "gymWHEEL", a comprehensive guide for gymnasts and coaches, published in collaboration with the IRV.

== Achievements (Selection) ==
- 2015: World Champion Straightline
- 2015: Vice World Champion All-Around
- 2018: World Champion Spiral
- 2024: World Champion Spiral
- 2024: Vice World Champion All-Around
- Multiple Swiss Champion (including 3-time gold winner in 2024 in all-around, straightline, and spiral)
