= Schönau an der Brend =

- Municipality
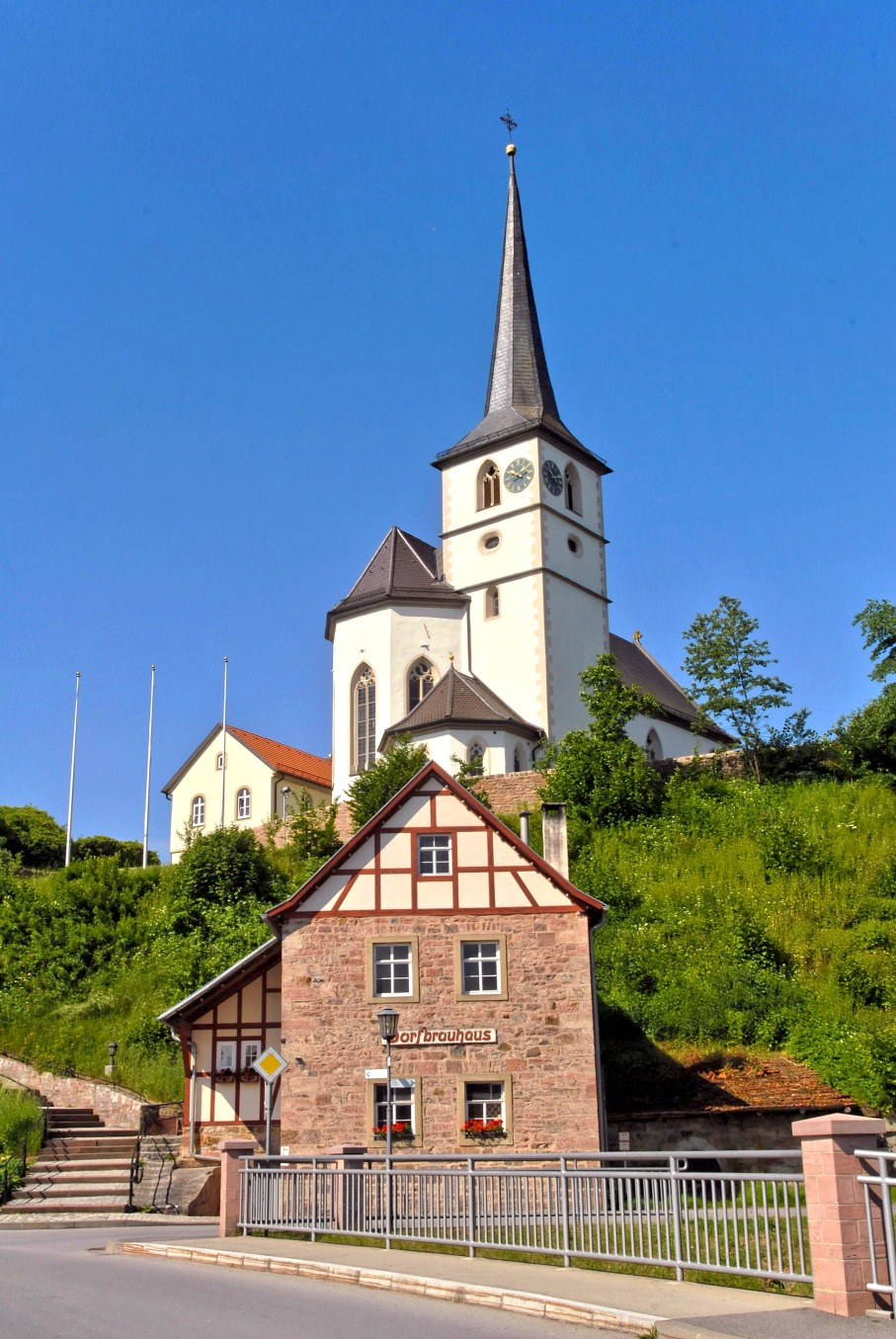
- Church of Saint Lawrence and the local brewery

- Coat of arms

- Location of Schönau an der Brend within Rhön-Grabfeld district
- Interactive map of Schönau an der Brend
- Location within Germany Location within Bavaria
- Coordinates: 50°23′N 10°6′E
- Country: Germany
- State: Bavaria
- Admin. region: Unterfranken
- District: Rhön-Grabfeld
- Municipal assoc.: Bad Neustadt an der Saale
- Subdivisions: 2 Ortsteile

Government
  - Mayor (2020–26): Sonja Rahm

Area
  - Total: 15.57 km^{2} (6.01 sq mi)
- Elevation: 320 m (1,050 ft)

Population (2025-12-31)
  - Total: 1,199
  - Density: 77.01/km^{2} (199.4/sq mi)
- Time zone: UTC+01:00 (CET)
  - Summer (DST): UTC+02:00 (CEST)
- Postal codes: 97659
- Dialling codes: 09775
- Vehicle registration: NES
- Website: www.schoenau-brend.de

Schönau an der Brend (German pronunciation: [ˈʃøːnaʊ ʔan deːɐ̯ ˈbʁɛnt], lit. 'Schönau on the Brend') is a municipality with 1,378 inhabitants located in the district of Rhön-Grabfeld in northern Bavaria, Germany. The municipality comprises two villages: Schönau an der Brend and Burgwallbach.

== Points of interest ==
- Gyrowheel Monument

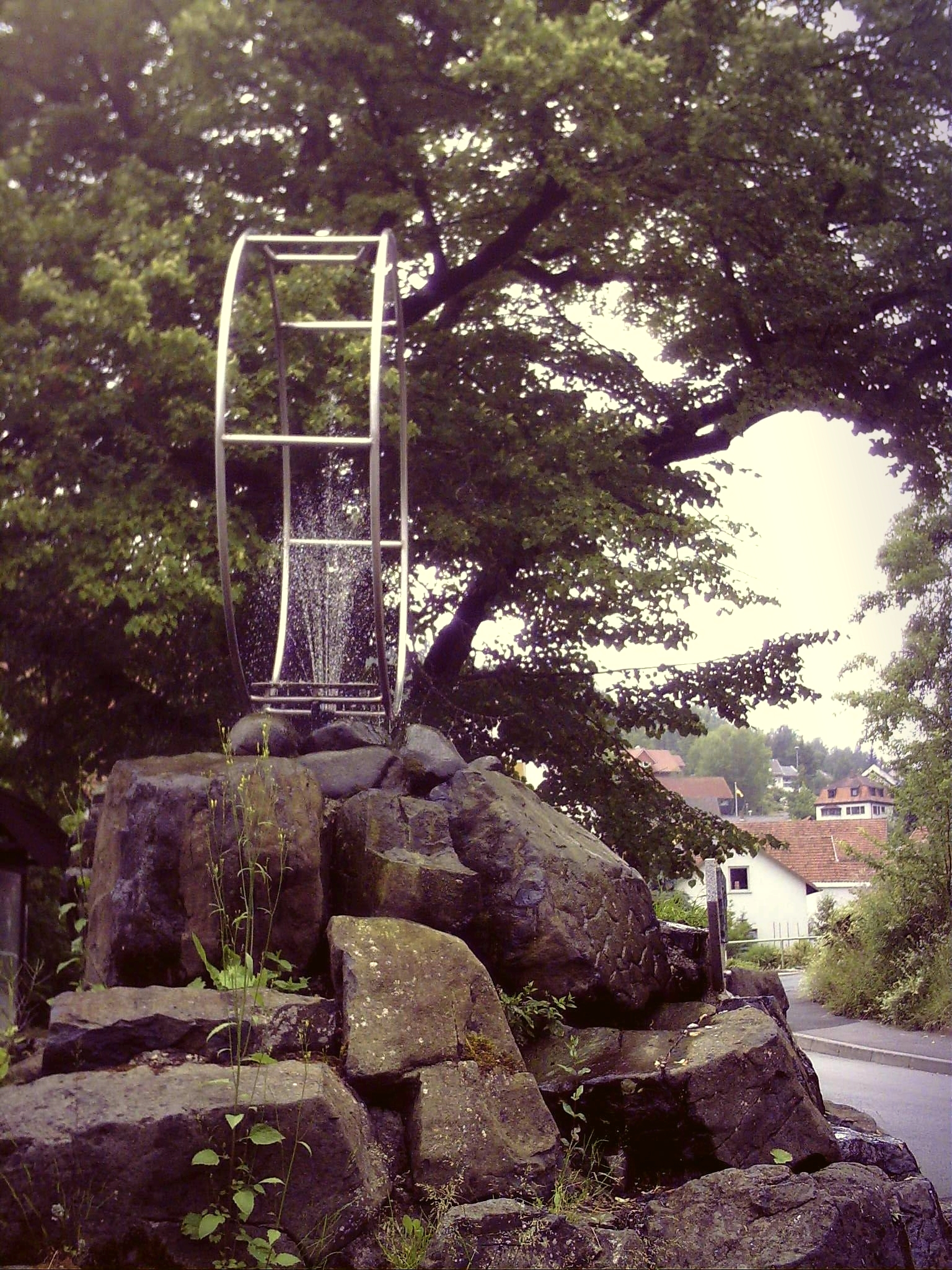
Monument to the invention of the Gyrowheel (gym wheel) by Otto Feick in 1926

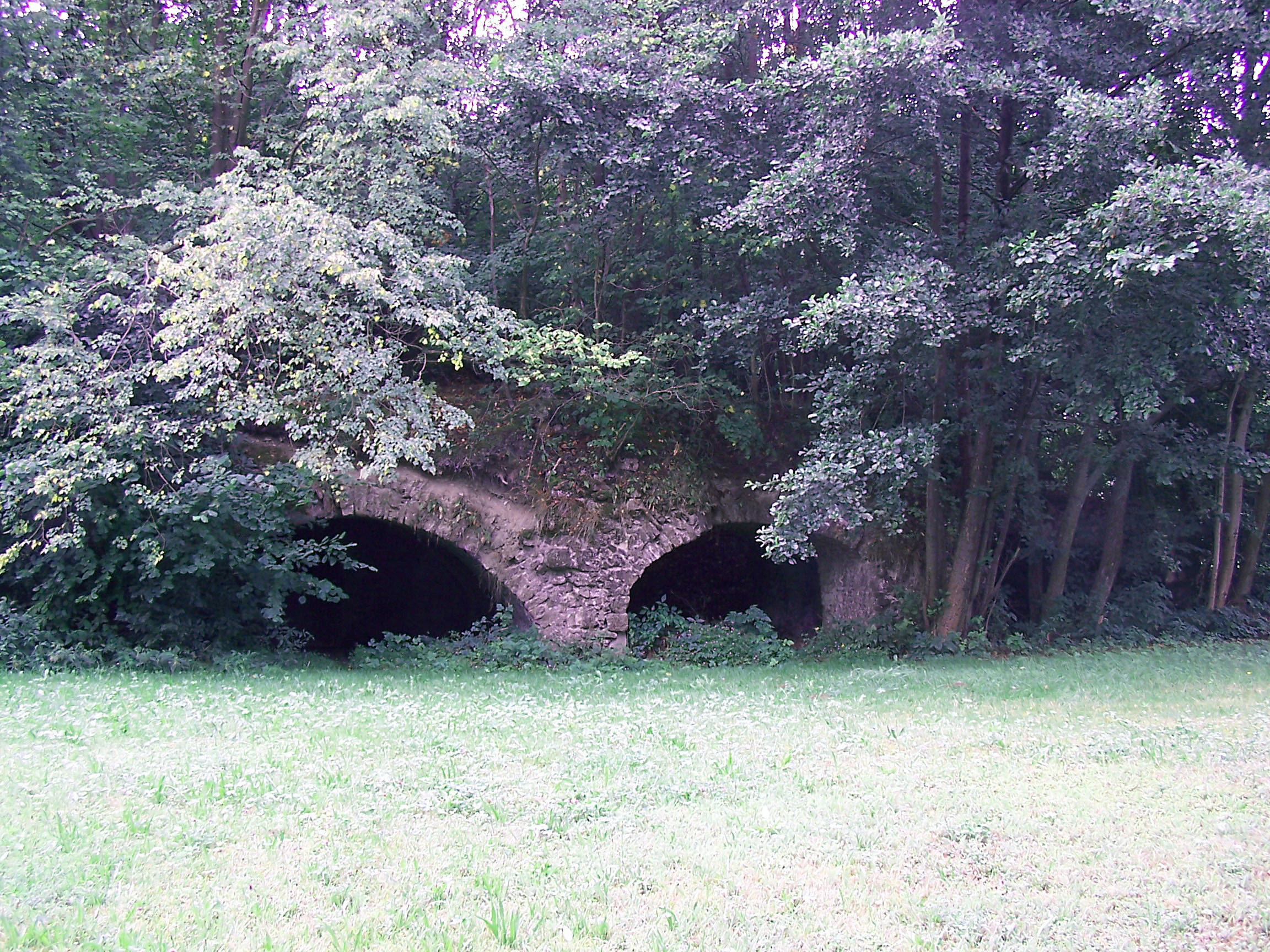
Ruin of Burgwallbach castle

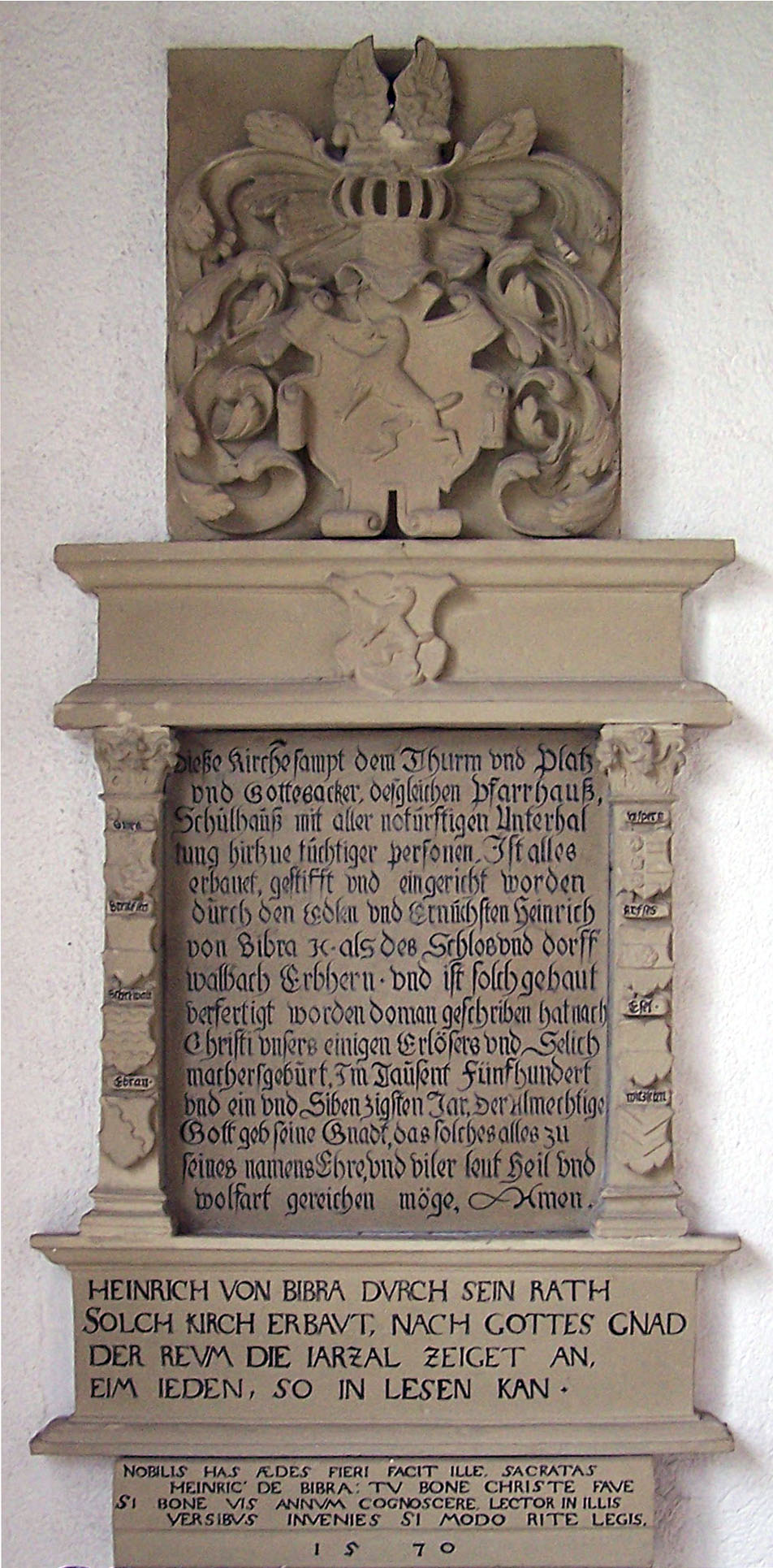
Monument of Heinrich von Bibra at the church in Burgwallbach
