= Yasuhiko Takahashi =

Japanese wheel gymnastics acrobat

Yasuhiko Takahashi 髙橋靖彦
Akita Northern Happinets

Personal information
- Born: May 12, 1985 (age 41) Kakunodate, Akita

Career information
- High school: Kakunodate (Semboku, Akita)
- College: University of Tsukuba

Yasuhiko Takahashi (髙橋靖彦, born May 12, 1985) is a Japanese wheel gymnastics acrobat. He has won three world championship titles and seven Japanese championship titles. He also works for the basketball team, Akita Northern Happinets. He played baseball until an injury at age 19 caused him to pursue wheel gymnastics instead. His technique of fast spinning is called "Oisa Tornade". Oisa is festival shout of Kakunodate Matsuri.

== Successes ==
=== World championship titles ===
- 2013 Chicago, United States, All around
- 2014 Berlin, Germany, with the Japanese National Team
- 2015 Lignano, Italy, All around
- 2015 Lignano, Italy, Straightline
- 2015 Lignano, Italy, Vault
- 2016 Cincinnati, United States, Straightline
- 2018 Magglingen, Switzerland, All around
- 2018 Magglingen, Switzerland, Vault
- 2018 Magglingen, Switzerland, Spiral
