= Wolfgang Bientzle =

German wheel gymnastics acrobat

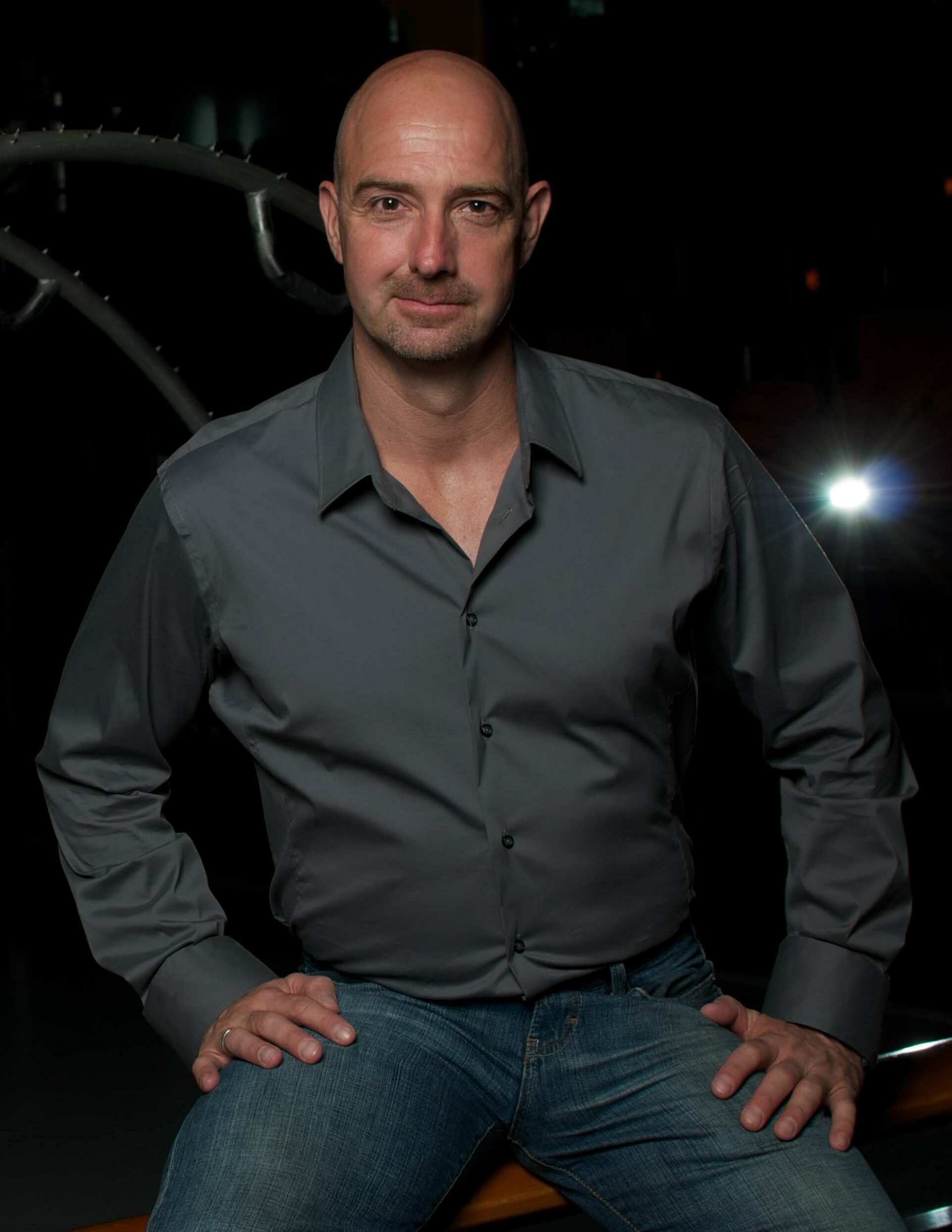
Wolfgang Bientzle in 2012

Wolfgang Bientzle (born 31 October 1966) is a German wheel gymnastics acrobat. He has won 8 World Champion Titles, 11 European Champion Titles and more than 60 German Champion Titles.

As a performer, coach and choreographer, he has worked with Cirque du Soleil, Disney and Holiday on Ice. He has contributed to shows in more than 50 countries and is highly respected among the Monte Carlo Circus Festival and the World Circus Festival in Moscow. Bientzle works as Executive Producer, Director, or Choreographer for conventions, exhibitions and corporate events.

Today Bientzle lives in Chicago and runs his own company Cirques Experience Chicago WHEEL JAM to educate and train people of every age to do Wheel gymnastics. His athletes have participated in several competitions, shows, events, and parades over the years including the Virginia International Tattoo and Chicago's annual Magnificent Mile Lights Festival.

== Successes ==
=== World Champion ===
- 1995 Den Helder, Netherlands, Straightline
- 1995 Den Helder, Netherlands, Spiral
- 1999 Limburg, Germany, All Around (3 disciplines)
- 1999 Limburg, Germany, with the German National Team
- 1999 Limburg, Germany, Straightline
- 1999 Limburg, Germany, Spiral
- 1999 Limburg, Germany, Vault
- 1999 Limburg, Germany, All Around ( 2 disciplines)

=== European Champion ===
- 1990 Taunusstein, Germany, Straightline
- 1990 Taunusstein, Germany, Spiral
- 1992 Cosenza, Italy, Straightline
- 1992 Cosenza, Italy, Spiral
- 1993 Lisbon, Portugal, Straightline
- 1993 Lisbon, Portugal, Spiral
- 1994 Marmande, France, Straightline
- 1990 Marmande, France, Spiral

=== German Champion ===
With consequent victories all through the novice class 1979 and 1980, passing the junior class 1981 to 1984, Bienzle became the youngest national champion in 1985. After retirement a short comeback in 1998 to be able to become a member of the german national team again - German Champion, Munich 1998 at the German Gymnastics Festival.
