= Malena Kernacs =

Austrian wheel gymnast

- Born: 2002 Salzburg, Austria

Gymnastics career
- Discipline: Wheel gymnastics
- Country represented: Austria
- Club: TGUS (Turn-Gym-Union-Salzburg)
Medal record
Women's wheel gymnastics
Representing Austria
World Championships
Silver medal – second place	2024 Almere	Spiral
Bronze medal – third place	2022 Sønderborg	All-around
Bronze medal – third place	2024 Almere	Straight line
Bronze medal – third place	2026 Göttingen	All-around
Bronze medal – third place	2026 Göttingen	Straight line
Team World Championships
Silver medal – second place	2025 Leipzig	Team

Malena Kernacs (born 2002) is an Austrian wheel gymnast. She is a multiple medalist at the World Championships.

== Biography ==
Malena Kernacs originates from Salzburg and attended the Sports High School (SSM) in Salzburg. She trains at the Turn-Gym-Union-Salzburg (TGUS) at the Sportzentrum Mitte.

Kernacs began her international career as a junior. At her first World Championships in 2018 in Magglingen, she was one of the youngest competitors and qualified for the individual straight line final. Four years later, at the 2022 World Championships in Sønderborg, she won the bronze medal in the all-around competition.

In the senior category, she quickly established herself at the top of national competition. In 2023, she won the Austrian national title in the all-around in Salzburg.

She competed again at the 2024 World Championships in Almere, where she won the silver medal in spiral and the bronze medal in straight line with music. She also placed fourth in the all-around.

At the 2025 Team World Championships in Leipzig, Kernacs was part of the Austrian women's team (alongside Birgit Halwachs, Luisa Galvan, and Selina Memeti) that won the silver medal behind Germany. She contributed significantly to the runner-up finish with her score in spiral and straight line.

Kernacs again represented Austria at the 2026 World Championships in Göttingen. She qualified for all individual finals and secured two bronze medals in straight line and all-around.
