= Kira Homeyer =

German gymnast (born 1998)

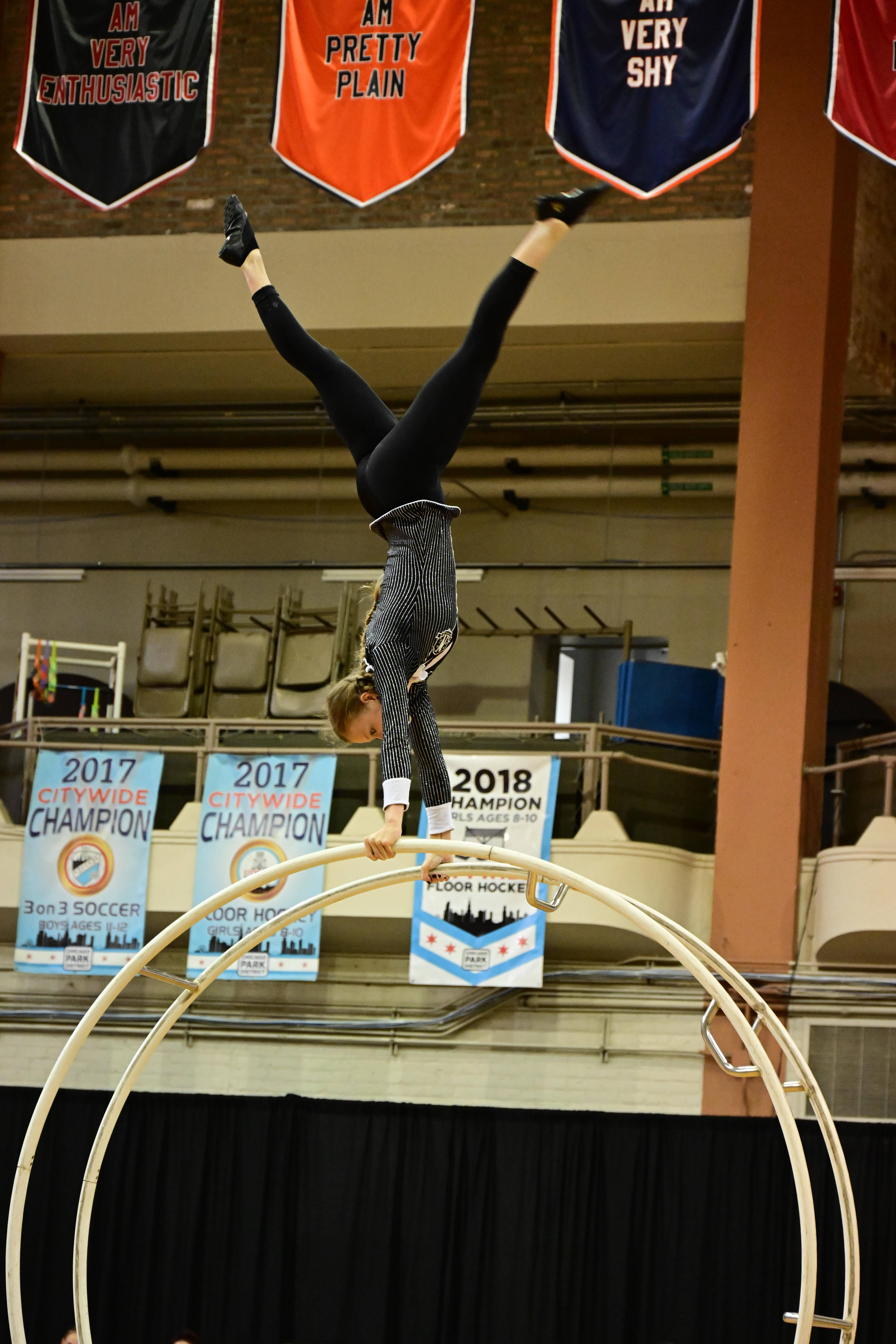
- Kira Homeyer at the 2023 World Championships

Personal information
- Full name: Kira Homeyer
- Born: 1998 (age 27–28)

Gymnastics career
- Discipline: Wheel gymnastics
- Country represented: Germany
- Club: SV Taunusstein
- Head coach: Katja Homeyer
Medal record
Women's wheel gymnastics
Representing Germany
World Championships
Gold medal – first place	2013 Chicago	Junior All-Around
Gold medal – first place	2013 Chicago	Junior Vault
Gold medal – first place	2015 Lignano	Junior All-Around
Gold medal – first place	2015 Lignano	Junior Straight Line
Gold medal – first place	2015 Lignano	Junior Spiral
Gold medal – first place	2015 Lignano	Junior Vault
Gold medal – first place	2016 Cincinnati	Straight Line
Gold medal – first place	2016 Cincinnati	Team
Silver medal – second place	2016 Cincinnati	All-Around
Gold medal – first place	2018 Magglingen	All-Around
Gold medal – first place	2018 Magglingen	Straight Line
Gold medal – first place	2018 Magglingen	Team
Silver medal – second place	2018 Magglingen	Vault
Bronze medal – third place	2018 Magglingen	Spiral
Gold medal – first place	2023	Team
Gold medal – first place	2024	All-Around
Gold medal – first place	2024	Straight Line
Bronze medal – third place	2024	Spiral

Kira Homeyer (born 1998) is a 14-time world champion in wheel gymnastics and has been an athlete on the German national team since 2012. In total, she has participated in 5 World Championships, winning 15 medals. She has also earned numerous titles at the German National Championships.

== Life ==
As the daughter of two wheel gymnasts, Jürgen Bientzle (brother of Wolfgang Bientzle) and national coach Katja Homeyer, the lives of Kira Homeyer and her siblings Marvin Homeyer and Finia Homeyer were shaped by wheel gymnastics from early childhood. From then on, she competed in events and appeared internationally in shows, parades, and other events with her mother Katja Homeyer as a member of Rhönradteam Taunusstein.

At age 15, she became a member of the German national junior team and successfully competed in her first World Championships in Chicago in 2013, winning titles in the all-around and vault. Two years later at the next World Championships in Lignano, Homeyer won all disciplines, becoming junior world champion in all-around, vault, straight line, and spiral.

In the same year at age 17, Homeyer decided to leave the junior division early to compete in the senior division (19+). By winning the all-around at the 54th German National Championships, she secured a spot on the German senior national team. At the 2016 World Championships in Cincinnati at age 18, Homeyer won the world title in straight line and silver in the all-around. Additionally, she competed for the German team and won the gold medal in the team World Championship.

At the 2018 World Championships in Magglingen, Homeyer was the most successful participant. She won gold in the all-around, straight line, and team event. She also secured silver in vault and bronze in spiral.

At the 2024 Word Championships in Magglingen she won gold in the all-around and straight-line.

== Career achievements ==
2024

- World Champion – All-Around
- World Champion – Straight Line
- Bronze Medal – Spiral

2023

- World Champion – Team

2021

- 1st Place – IRV Team Trophy Senior Women

2019

- 1st Place – Team World Cup

2018

- World Champion – All-Around
- World Champion – Straight Line
- Silver Medal – Vault
- Bronze Medal – Spiral
- World Champion – Team

2017

- Silver Medal – Team World Cup

2016

- World Champion – Straight Line
- Silver Medal – All-Around
- World Champion – Team

2015

- Junior World Champion – All-Around
- Junior World Champion – Spiral
- Junior World Champion – Straight Line
- Junior World Champion – Vault

2013

- Junior World Champion – All-Around
- Junior World Champion – Vault
