= German Gymnastics Federation =

German Gymnastics Federation DTB
- IOC nation: GER
- Sport: Gymnastics
- Official website: www.dtb.de

History
- Year of formation: 1848

Demographics
- Number of Gymnastics clubs: 18,777
- Membership size: 4,581,438

Affiliations
- International federation: Fédération Internationale de Gymnastique
- National Olympic Committee: Deutscher Olympischer Sportbund

Elected
- President: Alfons Hölzl

The German Gymnastics Federation (official German name: Deutscher Turner-Bund (DTB)) is the umbrella organization of the German gymnastics associations and clubs.

== History ==
The DTB was founded in 1848 at the first German gymnastics day in Hanau. The first German gymnastics festival was held 1860 in Coburg. In 1868, the DTB was changed into the German gymnasts (Deutsche Turnerschaft (DT)). Additionally, the social-democratic working gymnastics association (Arbeiterturnerbund (ATB)) was founded in 1893, which was renamed to be the working gymnastics and sport association (Arbeiter-Turn-und Sportbund (ATSB)) in 1919, and was later forbidden during the Nazism in Germany. In 1933, the DT tried to become another part in the sphere of the Nazi Party, alongside the already existing Sturmabteilung, a paramilitary wing of the Nazi Party. However, this failed because the dominance of an association that was hostile to competitive sport at the time would have hindered the NSDAP's aspiration that the best men dominate through sport. The DT dissolved itself in 1935 because of the Nazi Party's Gleichschaltung. After World War II, on 13 September 1947, the first unofficial German Championship in Artistic gymnastics was held in Northeim. At this event the working committee of German gymnastics (Deutscher Arbeitsausschuss Turnen (DAT)) was founded, which paved the way for the re-establishment of the DTB in Tübingen. In 1952, the DTB already had 900,000 members participating in more than 6100 sport clubs. The first German gymnastics festival (Deutsches Turnfest) took place in 1953 in Hamburg.

In 2005, the first international German gymnastics festival was held in Berlin. The next one was 2009 in Frankfurt am Main, followed by the third one 2013 in the Rhine-Neckar Metropolitan Region. In 2017, it took place in Berlin again, with the slogan “how colorful is that”.

In October of 2003, the DTB organized the Trampoline Gymnastics World Championships in Hannover. Four years later, the EnBW gymnastic world championships were held in Stuttgart. In April of 2010, the Rhythmic Gymnastics European Championships were organized by the DTB in Bremen followed by the European Artistic Gymnastics Championships one year later in Berlin. The next big event following were the Rhythmic Gymnastics World Championships held 2015 in Stuttgart. The most recent big events organized by the DTB were the 2019 Artistic Gymnastics World Championships in Stuttgart, and the 2022 European Artistic Gymnastics Championships in Munich as part of the 2022 European Championships.

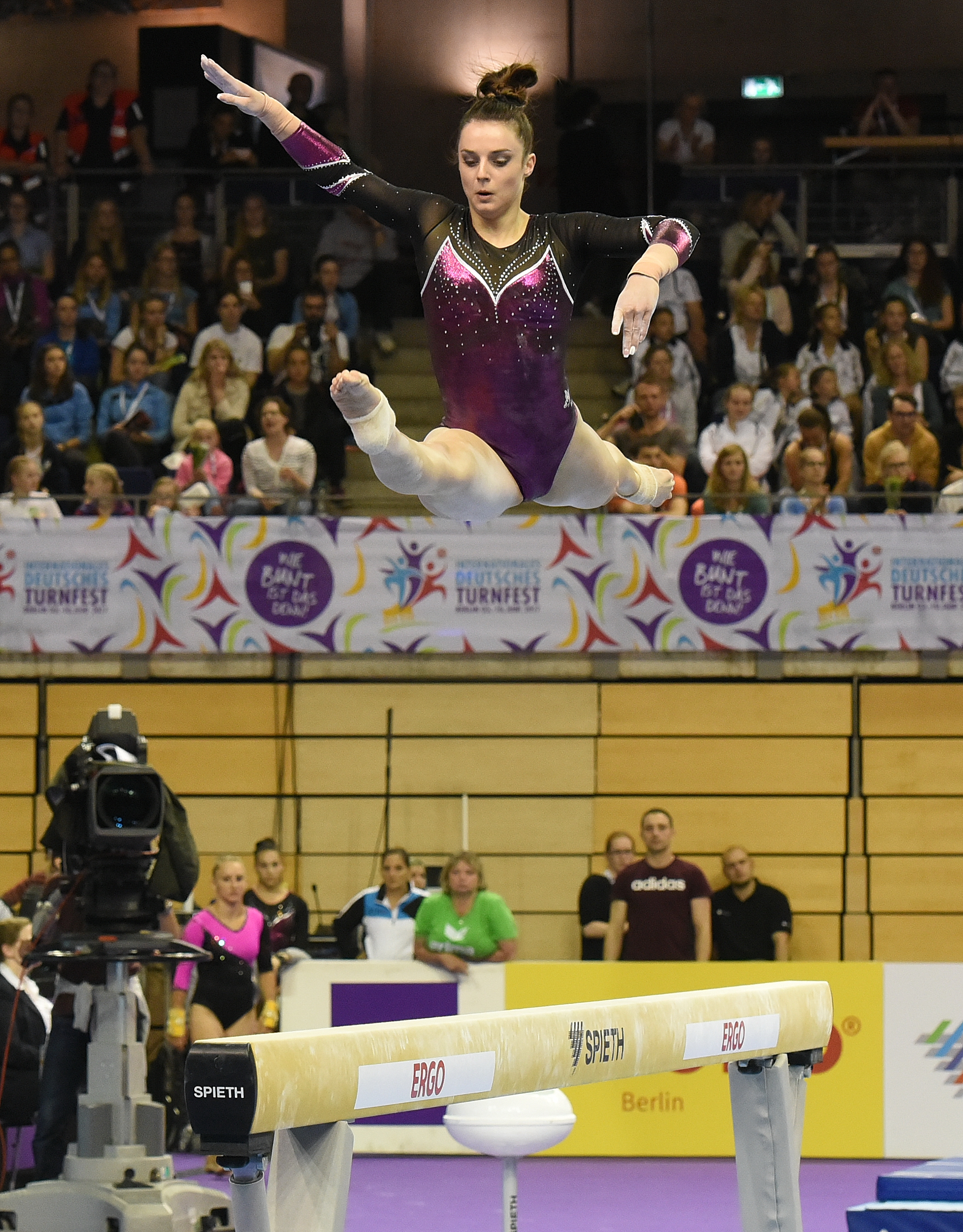
Pauline Schäfer on balance beam in Berlin 2017

The first gold medal in an international world championship competition for the DTB was won by the German national team at the Trampoline Gymnastics World Championships 1986 in Paris. This success was repeated in 2001. Pauline Schäfer-Betz won the first single event gold medal for the DTB on balance beam at the 2017 Artistic Gymnastics World Championships in Montreal.

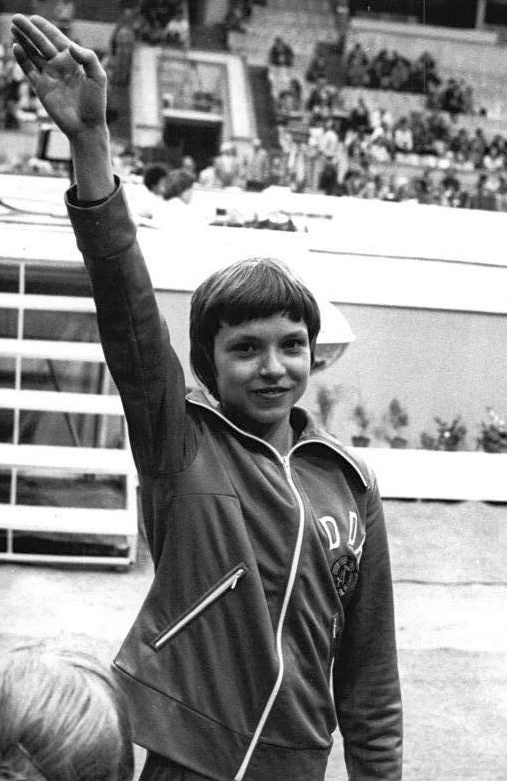
Maxi Gnauck in 1983

This made her the second German woman to win a single-event gold medal at an international gymnastics competition after Maxi Gnauck, who won the gold medal on uneven bars for the GDR at the 1980 Summer Olympics in Moscow.

== Organisation ==
The DTB is a registered association, which is led by a committee of 10 people. Since 2016, Dr. Alfons Hölzl has been taking over as president of this association, making him the successor of Rainer Brechtken. The administrative office is in Frankfurt am Main, Germany.

Besides the federal committee, the DTB is split up in 22 regional member associations, 20 of which are gymnastics associations. North Rhine-Westphalia, Rhineland-Palatinate, Baden-Württemberg and Bavaria each have more than one association.

The Academic gymnastics association (Akademischer Turnbund (ATB)) and the Bavarian gymnastics and playing association are special members of the DTB.

The German gymnastics federation is regionally structured in smaller gymnastic districts, counties, and regions. On a national level, it is part of the German Olympic Sports Confederation because of its function as an umbrella Organisation. Internationally, the DTB is a member of the International Gymnastics Federation (FIG) and a founding member of the European Gymnastics (UEG), existing since 1982.

== Guidelines ==
In 2004, at the national gymnastics day in Berlin, the DTB published its guidelines which is a statement of the focus of its work:

- Strengthening of the main sports which are artistic gymnastics as well as other forms of gymnastics
- Promoting children's gymnastics as flagship of the federation
- Securing appropriate opportunities for adolescents in sport and leisure activities
- Securing the leading position in physical fitness and health by offering appropriate opportunities for young adults and adolescent youth, especially females
- Promoting and funding of Olympic high-performance sport with the goal of international representation and success
- Developing contemporary opportunities in its sports and expertise fields

Based on these guidelines, the DTB tries to standardize its work as sports federation while focusing on these main goals and interests. A result of this standardization that can already be seen in the newly developed categories children's gymnastics, Gymwelt (gymnastics world), and Turnen! (gymnastics).

== Organisations of the German Gymnastics Federation ==
=== German gymnastics festival club ===
One of the main responsibilities of the DTB is the organisation of gymnastic festivals. The German gymnastic festivals include around 100,000 participants and was additionally made an international event in 2005. The international version of the German gymnastics festival is the biggest competitional and popular sports event worldwide. To facilitate the administration of the gymnastics festival, the DTB created the German gymnastic festival club, which is a registered association whose function is the organization of those events. The last international German gymnastics festival was held 2017 in Berlin (3. – 10. July). There was supposed to be another one in 2021, which was cancelled due to the COVID-19 pandemic. The next international German gymnastics festival will be held 2025 in Leipzig.

=== German youth gymnastics ===
The German youth gymnastics (Deutsche Turnerjugend (DTJ)) is the youth organisation of the DTB. The DTJ is one of the biggest youth organisations in Germany, including over 2 million members. The guidelines the DTJ is following are:

- Conceptual work focused on content-based appliance in youth and children's gymnastics. Further, the creation of new ideas in sport and leisure activities connected to education possibilities.
- Creation of competition adapted to youth, like youth gymnastic association championships.
- Participation at the German Gymnastics Festival, EUROGYM, and the World Gymnaestrada as well as meetings of youth gymnastics regionally, nationally and even internationally. The goal of these meetings is to make participating in gymnastics more appealing for young people, while strengthening their social and interactive skills in group settings.
- Dealing with socio-political topics connected to sports and youth. On top of that, the DTJ has members representing youth in committees within the DTB and the German sports youth association.

== Quality certificates ==
In 1994, the German Gymnastics Federation created the quality certificate Pluspunkt Gesundheit.DTB. This certificate was created to honor high-quality health programs. To be awarded with this certificate, certain criteria need to be met.

== Controversies ==
Coach Gabriele Frehse was accused of physical and emotional abuse and abuse of power, a process which is known as the Chemnitzer Turnaffäre (gymnastic scandal of Chemnitz).

In December 2024, Tabea Alt alleged that her training environment had been physically and emotionally abusive and that she had competed on fractures during her career. She said that she had written a letter about these issues to her trainers and the president of the German Gymnastics Federation, among others, in 2021, but she felt that it had been ignored. Other gymnasts also came forward with stories of abuse, and three-time Olympian Elisabeth Seitz expressed her support for those gymnasts and called for an investigation and for changes to be made. In response to the allegations, the German Gymnastics Federation said that it would launch an investigation with external help.
