= Wheel gymnastics =

Form of gymnastics using a wheel-shaped apparatus

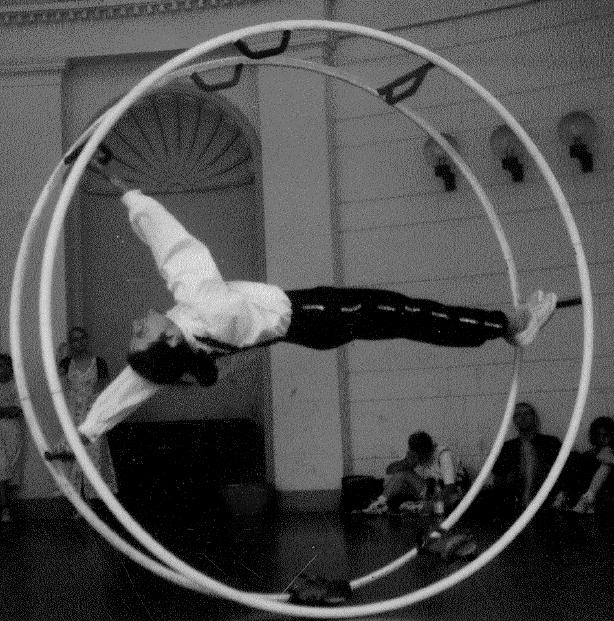
Aachen (1996)

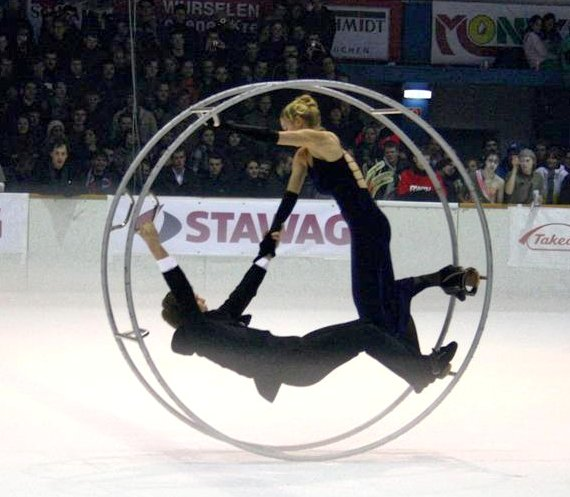
RollAix Performers on ice, RWTH Aachen U. (2009)

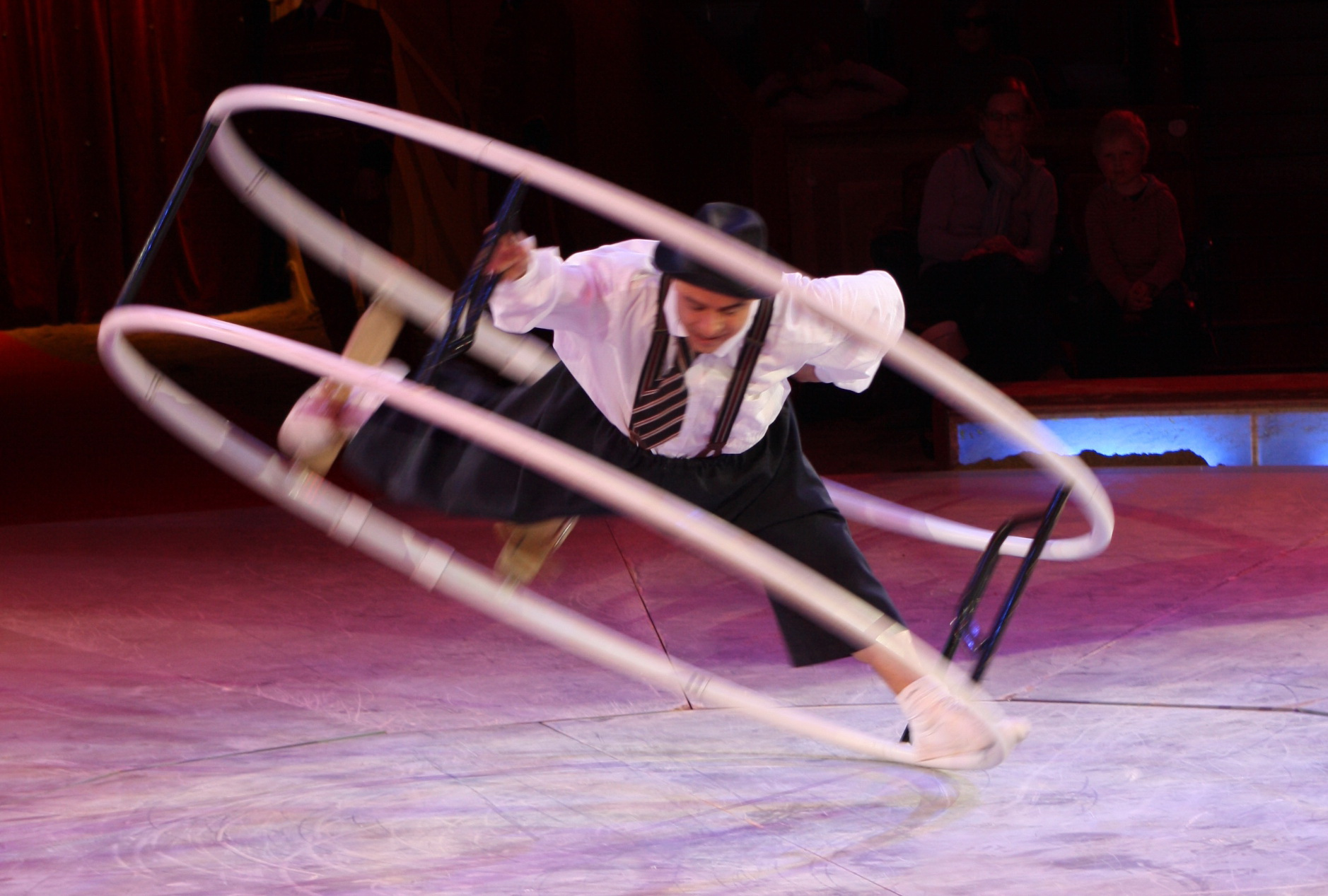
Russian circus performer (2009)

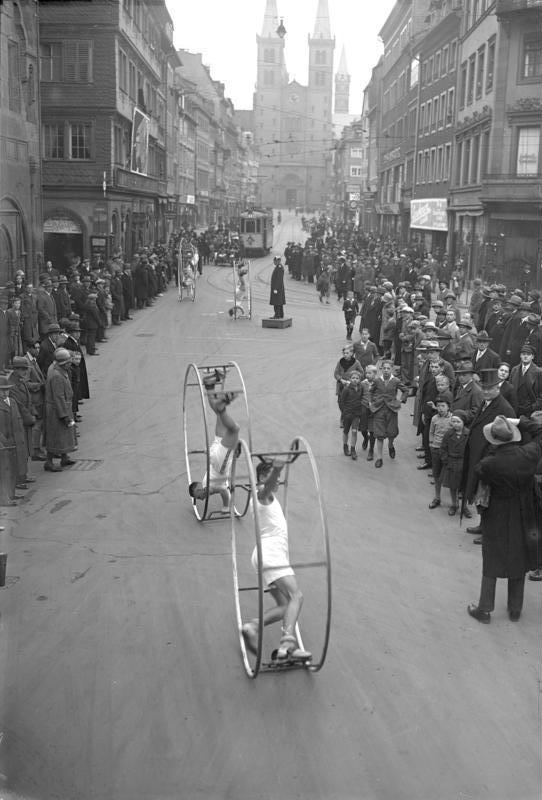
Würzburg (1931)

Wheel gymnastics (German: Rhönradturnen) is a form of gymnastics that originated in Germany. Wheel gymnasts do exercises in a large wheel or hoop known as the Rhönrad, gymnastics wheel, gym wheel, or German wheel, in the beginning also known as ayro wheel, aero wheel, and Rhon rod.

== Wheel design ==
The large wheel consists of two circles in parallel, which are framed together with six spokes. Two are simple tubes, two are equipped with a handle and two have a footrest. The diameter of the wheel depends on the length of the gymnast, so that the gymnast can hold themselves on the grips when fully stretched. The wheels are available from a diameter of 130 to 245 cm. The wheels weigh between 40 and 60 kg. They are available in several depths and colors.

== History ==
The wheel was invented in 1925 by Otto Feick in Schönau an der Brend. The grandson of a blacksmith, Feick was inspired by the memory of an event from his childhood in Reichenbach, when he had tied sticks between two hoops that his grandfather had made and rolled down a hill.

He filed for a patent as "wheel-gymnastic and sports equipment". He had invented the wheel in Ludwigshafen am Rhein c. 1920–1922, on the grounds of the VSK Germania, a sports club, of which he was the founding chairman. The patent was issued on 8 November 1925; the name "Rhönrad" has been registered and protected since 1926 ("Rhön" is the name of the mountain region where the wheel was invented).

The Rhönrad was featured at the GeSoLei trade fair held in Düsseldorf in 1926.

In 1936, this sport was shown at the Olympic Games in Berlin, but was not presented as an Olympic discipline.

The focus of wheel gymnastics remains largely in Germany, but there are wheel groups in several countries and every 2 years the International Wheel Gymnastics Federation holds a World Championships competition. Former world champion wheel gymnast Wolfgang Bientzle moved from Germany to Chicago and runs his own company WHEEL JAM to educate and train people of every age to do Wheel gymnastics.

Wheel gymnastics were used for pilot training with the Imperial Japanese Army Air Service to sport their dexterity and physical prowess before their peers, in particular by the Japanese Special Attack Units in Kamikaze pilot training. Using such contraptions would give them greater balance in order to inure them to the twists and turns they would experience in the air.

== Disciplines ==
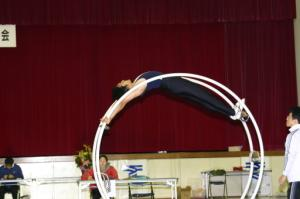
- The discipline straight-line
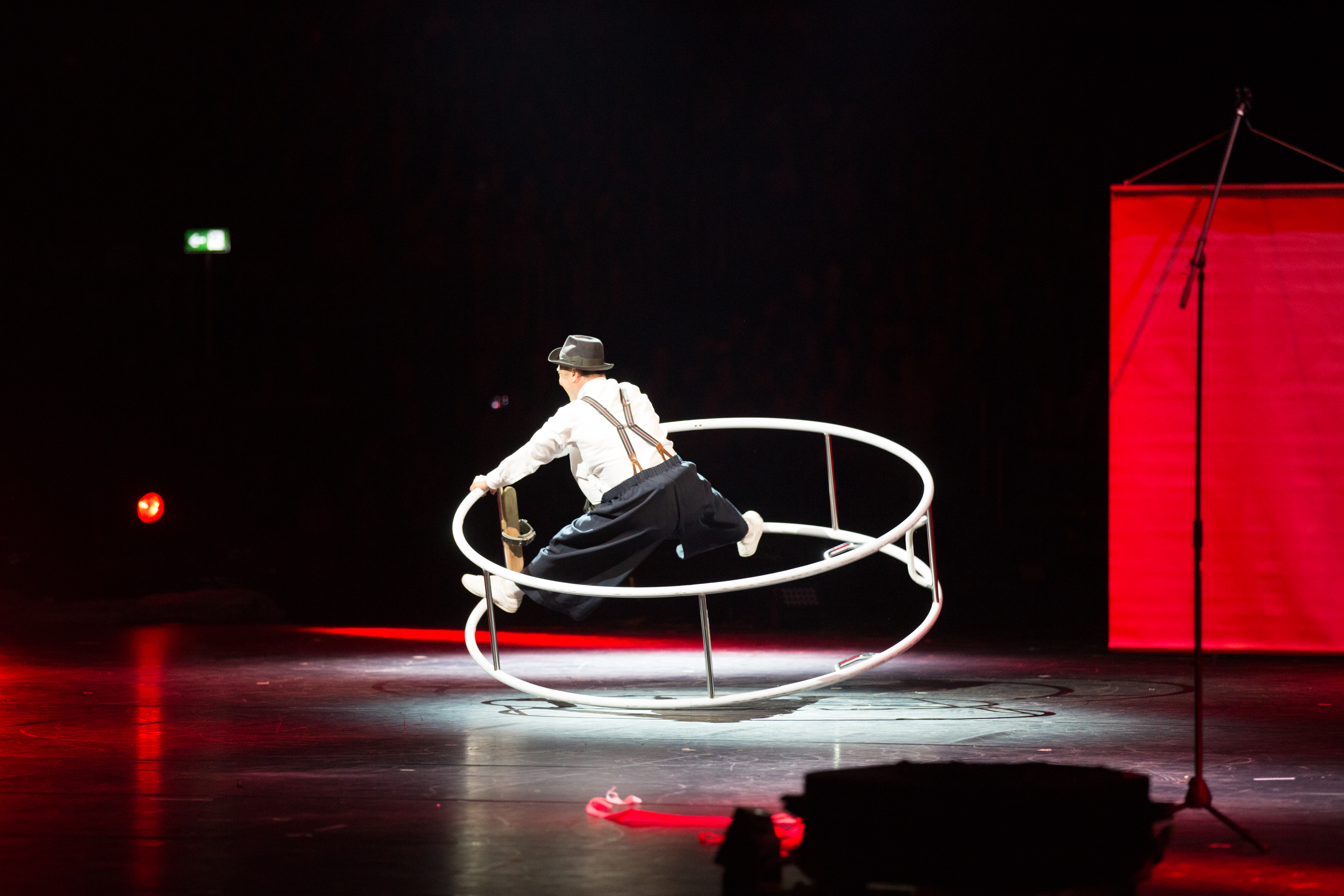
  The discipline spirale (small spirale)
  Straight-line: In straight-line, the wheel is set in motion on both rims. The imaginary lines traced by the rims in contact with the floor are parallel. Straight-line can be performed with or without music. At the world championships the seniors (older than 18 years old) perform with music, while the juniors perform without music.
- Spirale: The wheel is set in motion on one rim and for most skills the wheel rim in contact with the floor traces an approximately circular path. There are 3 categories of elements in spirale. In the "big spirale" the path of the wheel is bigger than the diameter of the wheel and the angle between the wheel and the floor is bigger than 60° degree. In the "small spirale" the angle is less than 30° and the path of the wheel on the is smaller the diameter of the wheel. In the "vertical spirale" the wheel moves in an almost upright position. The path of the wheel on the floor is extremely small. The wheel rotates around the longitudinal axis.
- Vault: The gymnast sets the wheel in motion. After a run-up the gymnast mounts the wheel, from where he/she performs can perform various dismounts on to a landing mat. Examples of dismounts are tuck/pike/straight front sommersaults.
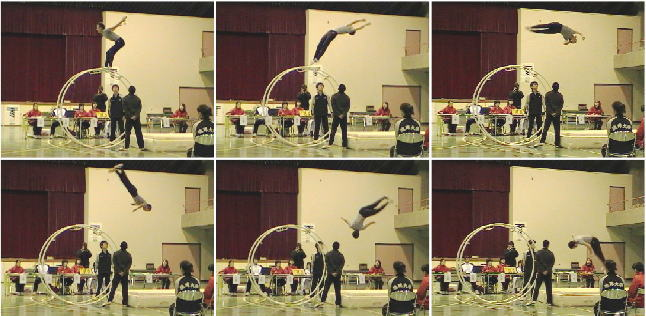
  The discipline vault (only dismount pictured)

== Code of points ==
The code of points describes exactly how the routines are judged. At the world championship 2022 in Sønderborg the IRV presented a big update for the code of points.

The score of each discipline (except straight-line with music) is calculated in the following way. In straight-line with music the average of the execution and the artistic impression is added instead of only the execution:

Difficulty (max 10.0) + Execution (max 10.0) - Neutral deductions = max 20 Points

The difficulty score consist of max 8.0 (8 most difficult elements count) for the difficulty of the elements and 2.0 for fulfilling structure groups. The execution score is calculated by deducting 0.1 (minor deduction), 0.3 (medium), 0.5 (major) or 1.0 (fall / assist of coach) from the 10.0.

== International Wheel Gymnastics Federation (IRV) ==
International Wheel Gymnastics Federation (IRV)
- Internationaler Rhönradturnverband
- Formation: January 1995
- Founder: Switzerland, Japan, Germany, Netherlands
- Founded at: Basel, Switzerland
- Headquarters: Bern, Switzerland
- Official language: English
- Leader: Mathias Reich, Switzerland
- Website: https://wheelgymnastics.sport/

The International Wheel Gymnastics Federation (short IRV), respectively original Internationale Rhönradturnverband is a federation for the sports cyr wheel and gym wheel. It was created 1995 in Basel by the members Germany, Switzerland, Japan and the Netherlands.

=== Members ===
Members are the national federation of the following countries. There are 4 Types of members (Entry Member, Bronze Member, Silver Member and Gold Member). The higher the level the more the country has to pay and the more they can profit from the IRV.

- Germany (since 1995, Gold Member)
- Switzerland (since 1995, Gold Member)
- United States (since 2009, Gold Member)
- Japan (since 1995, Bronze Member)
- Netherlands (since 1995, Bronze Member)
- Norway (since 1997, Bronze Member)
- Austria (since 2003, Bronze Member)
- Colombia (since 2011, Bronze Member)
- Israel (since 2012, Bronze Member)
- Denmark (since 2015, Bronze Member)
- France (since 2024, Bronze Member)

=== Activities ===
The IRV organizes all international competitions like the World Championship. The federation is also responsible for developing scoring regulations, competition concepts and training programs. Larger projects of the various members are sometimes partly supported financially and announced on the website. The mission of the IRV is to spread the gym wheel and cyr wheel more around the world.

=== Athletes' Commission ===
The purpose of the Athletes' Commission (short AC) is to gather and filter ideas, interests, comments of the wheel gymnastics community (athletes, coaches, judges, etc.) and forward the important ones to the IRV. The Athletes' Commission consists of a of maximum 2 cyr athletes, 2 gymwheel athletes and 2 coaches, who are elected from the delegations at the World Championships. The mandate lasts until the next World Championship.

2024 - 2026: - Simon Rufener, - Achim Pitz, - Malena Kernacs, - Cyrus Luciano

2022 - 2024: - Simon Rufener, - Katja Homeyer, - Isabel Pietro, - Kanai Shigeki

2020 - 2022: - Simon Rufener, - Katja Homeyer, - Svea Hünnig, - Yasuhiko Takahashi, - Tammi Livni

== World championships ==
The IRV (Internationaler Rhönradturnverband) organizes every two years a world championship. Between these world championships the IRV organizes a team world championship, where the best 4 countries (qualified at the normal world championship) compete as a team against each other.

Previous World Championships:

Nr.	year	city	country
1	1995	Den Helder	Netherlands
2	1997	Antwerpen	Belgium
3	1999	Limburg an der Lahn	Germany
4	2001	Liestal	Switzerland
5	2003	Lillehammer	Norway
6	2005	Aachen Bütgenbach	Germany Belgium
7	2007	Salzburg	Austria
8	2009	Baar	Switzerland
9	2011	Arnsberg	Germany
10	2013	Chicago	United States
11	2015	Lignano Sabbiadoro	Italy
12	2016 *	Cincinnati	United States
13	2018	Magglingen	Switzerland
–	2020 **	New York	United States
14	2022	Sønderborg	Denmark
15	2024	Almere	Netherlands

* From there on the IRV organized the world championship at even years.

** The world championship was canceled, because of COVID-19.

=== World champions ===
==== Senior Men ====
Nr.	Year	Straight-line	Spirale	Vault	All-round (2)	All-round (3 disciplines)
1	1995	Wolfgang Bientzle	Wolfgang Bientzle	—	—	—
2	1997	Miroslav Zorbic	Norbert Sinz	—	—	—
3	1999	Wolfgang Bientzle	Wolfgang Bientzle	Wolfgang Bientzle	Wolfgang Bientzle	Wolfgang Bientzle
4	2001	Jan Schäfer	Jan Schäfer	Jan Schäfer	—	Jan Schäfer
5	2003	Julius Petri	Julius Petri	Jan Schäfer	—	Julius Petri
6	2005	Achus Emeis	Constantin Malchin	Achus Emeis	—	Achus Emeis
7	2007	Achus Emeis	Constantin Malchin	Motonobu Tamura	—	Achus Emeis
8	2009	Robert Maaser	Robert Maaser	Robert Maaser	—	Robert Maaser
9	2011	Boy Looijen	Christoph Clausen	Robert Maaser	—	Robert Maaser
10	2013	Kazuya Ezuka	Motonobu Tamura	Yasuhiko Takahashi	—	Yasuhiko Takahashi
11	2015	Yasuhiko Takahashi	Max Brinkmann	Yasuhiko Takahashi	—	Yasuhiko Takahashi
12	2016	Yasuhiko Takahashi	Marcel Schawo	Yasuhiko Takahashi	—	Marcel Schawo
13	2018	Carsten Heimer	Yasuhiko Takahashi	Yasuhiko Takahashi	—	Yasuhiko Takahashi
14	2022	Simon Rufener	Malte Schröder	Ryuichi Goto	—	Simon Rufener
15	2024	Simon Rufener	Johannes Stolper	Ryuichi Goto	—	Simon Rufener

==== Senior Women ====
Nr.	Year	Straight-line	Spirale	Vault	All-round (2)	All-round (3 disciplines)
1	1995	Maike Klatte	Maike Klatte	—	—	—
2	1997	Claudia Geyer	Janin Oer	—	—	—
3	1999	Katja Homeyer	Maike Klatte	Lena Bertelsen	Maike Klatte	Maike Klatte
4	2001	Julia Pohling	Julia Pohling	Julia Pohling	—	Julia Pohling
5	2003	Janin Oer	Janin Oer	Naomi Kunihiro	—	Julia Pohling
6	2005	Janin Oer	Nadine Burkhardt	Takako Hiwa	—	Janin Oer
7	2007	Cécile Meschberger	Janin Oer	Heidi Hagen	—	Janin Oer
8	2009	Jenny Hoffmann	Kathrin Schad	Kirstin Heerdink	—	Svenja Trepte
9	2011	Laura Stullich	Svenja Trepte	Kirstin Heerdink	—	Laura Stullich
10	2013	Laura Stullich	Kathrin Schad	Sarah Metz	—	Riccarda Vogel
11	2015	Cheyenne Rechsteiner	Yana Looft	Sarah Metz	—	Lilia Lessel
12	2016	Lilia Lessel	Yana Looft	Lilia Lessel	—	Lilia Lessel
13	2018	Kira Homeyer	Cheyenne Rechsteiner, - Lilia Lessel	Myrna van Berkel	—	Kira Homeyer
14	2022	-Birgit Halwachs, -Karina Peisker, -Horiguchi Aya	Lilia Lessel	Sarah Metz	—	Karina Peisker
15	2024	Kira Homeyer	Cheyenne Rechsteiner	Armoni Inbar	—	Kira Homeyer

==== Junior Boys ====
Nr.	Year	Straight-line	Spirale	Vault	All-round
15	2024	Timon Peter	Patrick Møller	Aquila Ziddah	Timon Peter

==== Junior Girls ====
Nr.	Year	Straight-line	Spirale	Vault	All-round
15	2024	Annika Wasmuth	Frieda Wilke	Bar Dubinsky	Sophie Julius

==== Team ====
Nr.	Year	Winner Team	Athletes
1	1995	—	
2	1997	—	
3	1999	Germany	Katja Homeyer, Ines Meurer, Janin Oer, Maike Klatte, Wolfgang Bientzle, Nico Budniok
4	2001	Germany	Julia Pohling, Janin Oer, Ursula Kömen, Jan Schäfer, Julius Petri, Constantin Malchin
5	2003	Germany	Jan Schäfer, Julia Pohling, Janin Oer, Constantin Malchin, Holger Schneider, Julius Petri
6	2005	Germany	Nadine Burkhard, Katrin Schwaben, Janin Oer, Julius Petri, Achus Emeis, Constantin Malchin
7	2007	Germany	Janin Oer, Julius Petri, Achus Emeis, Constantin Malchin, Sabine Bierfreund, Christoph Clausen
8	2009	Germany	Jenny Hoffmann, Julia Pohling, Constantin Malchin, Robert Maaser, Simon Knapp, Christoph Clausen
9	2011	Germany	Jenny Hoffmann, Svenja Trepte, Laura Stullich, Kathrin Schad, Robert Maaser, Christoph Clausen
10	2013	Germany	Svenja Trepte, Christoph Clausen, Riccarda Vogel, Kathrin Schad, Sarah Metz, Laura Stullich
11	2015	Germany	Yana Looft, Marcel Schawo, Sarah Metz, Lilia Lessel, Jasmin Schönbach, Dirk Wünsch

== See also ==
- Cyr wheel
- Sport in Germany
- Wheel of Steel
