= List of German entrepreneurs =

This is a list of German entrepreneurs, businesspeople of German nationality or with German citizenship.

== A–M ==
- Maximilian Delphinius Berlitz (1852–1921), founder of Berlitz Language Schools
- Carl Bertelsmann (1791–1850), founder of Bertelsmann, subsidiaries include Random House and BMG
- Johann Adam Birkenstock, in 1774 founded Birkenstock shoe company
- Hermann Blohm (1848–1930), in 1877, co-founder Blohm+Voss, manufacturers of ships
- Carl F. W. Borgward (1890–1963), founder of Borgward
- August Borsig (1804–1854), founder of Borsig Werke
- Robert Bosch (1861–1942), industrialist, engineer and inventor; founder of Robert Bosch GmbH
- Hugo Boss (1885–1948), fashion designer, founder of Hugo Boss
- Max Braun, founder of Braun GmbH, makers of personal care appliances, coffee makers and other home appliances
- Adolphus Busch (1839–1913), co-founder of Anheuser-Busch brewing company
- Adolph Coors (1847–1929), founder of the Adolph Coors Company brewery, now part of MillerCoors
- Gottlieb Daimler (1834–1900), inventor, engineer and industrialist; founder of Daimler Motoren Gesellschaft, now Daimler AG
- Adolf Dassler (1900–1978), founder of sportswear company Adidas
- Rudolf Dassler (1898–1974), founder of sportwear company Puma
- Adelbert Delbrück (1822–1899), co-founder of Deutsche Bank
- Guido Henckel von Donnersmarck (1830–1916), founder of company Schlesische AG für Bergbau und Zinkhüttenbetrieb
- Friedrich Engelhorn (1821–1902), founder of the chemical company BASF
- Kaspar Faber (1730–1784), founder of Faber-Castell, manufacturers of office supplies, art supplies, writing instruments and leather goods
- Günther Fielmann (1939–2024), founder of Fielmann
- Wilhelm von Finck (1848–1924), co-founder of Munich Re and Allianz
- Eduard Fresenius (1874–1946), founder of Fresenius
- Jakob Fugger the Elder (1368–1469), founder of Fugger bank
- Marcus Goldman (1821–1904), co-founder of Goldman Sachs
- Max Grundig (1908–1989), founder of Grundig
- Franz Haniel (1779–1868), managing director of Franz Haniel & Cie.
- Karl Haniel (1877–1944), managing director of Franz Haniel & Cie.
- Edmund Heckler (1906–1960), co-founder Heckler & Koch, 1948
- Ernst Heinkel (1888–1958), founder of Heinkel, manufacturers of airplanes
- Richard Hellmann (1876–1971), founder of Hellmann's Mayonnaise
- Johann Peter Henckels, founder of (Zwilling) J.A. Henckels, manufacturers of kitchen knives, scissors, cookware and flatware
- Friedrich Karl Henkel (1848–1930), founder of Henkel
- Max Herz (1905–1965), co-founder of Tchibo, 1949
- Dietmar Hopp (born 1940), co-founder of SAP
- August Horch (1868–1951), founder of Audi automobile company in 1909
- Helmut Horten (1909–1987), founder of Horten AG
- Georg Ferdinand Howaldt (1802–1883), founder of Howaldtswerke-Deutsche Werft in 1835
- Carolus Magnus Hutschenreuther (1794–1845), founder of Hutschenreuther
- Christoph Ingenhoven (1960), founder of christoph ingenhoven architects
- Hugo Junkers (1859–1935), founder of Junkers in 1895, manufacturers of airplanes
- Rudolph Karstadt (1856–1944), founder of Karstadt
- Ernst Keil (1816–1878), founder and publisher of Die Gartenlaube
- Erich Kellerhals (1939–2017), co-founder of Media Markt
- Carl Kellner, founder of Ernst Leitz GmbH, which later became Leica Camera, Leica Geosystems, and Leica Microsystems, producing cameras, geosurvey equipment and microscopes
- Roman Kirsch, founder of Lesara
- Carl Heinrich Theodor Knorr (1800–1875) founder of Knorr
- Georg Krauß (1826–1906), co-founder of Krauss-Maffei, 1838
- Theodor Koch (1905–1976), co-founder of Heckler & Koch, 1948
- Friedrich Krupp (1787–1826), steel manufacturer and founder of the steel producers ThyssenKrupp
- Heinrich Lanz (1838–1905), founder of Heinrich Lanz AG
- Henry Lehman (1822–1855), Emanuel Lehman (1827–1907) and Mayer Lehman (1830–1897), German-born bankers, co-founders of Lehman Brothers
- Ernst Leitz II (1871–1956), owner of Leitz Camera
- Louis Leitz (1846–1918), founder of Leitz
- Carl von Linde (1842–1934), founder of The Linde Group
- Henry Lomb (1828–1908), co-founder of Bausch & Lomb
- Friedrich Lürssen (1851–1916), founder of Lürssen in 1875, manufacturers of ships
- Joseph Anton von Maffei (1790–1870), founder of Maffei, later 1838 Krauss-Maffei
- Wolfgang Marguerre (born 1941), founder of Octapharma
- Carl Alexander von Martius (1838–1920), co-founder of Agfa
- Oscar Ferdinand Mayer (1859–1955), founder of the processed-meat firm Oscar Mayer
- Friedrich Jacob Merck (1621–1678), founder of Merck KGaA (Engel-Apotheke in Darmstadt)
- George Merck (1867–1926), founder of Merck & Co
- Joseph Mendelssohn (1770–1848), founder of former bank Mendelssohn & Co
- Paul Mendelssohn Bartholdy (1841–1880), co-founder of Agfa
- Willy Messerschmitt (1898–1978), founder of Messerschmitt
- Heinrich Meyerfreund, founder of Garoto, chocolate company in Brazil
- Carl Miele (1869–1938), founder of Miele, manufacturer of domestic appliances
- Frederick Miller (born as Friedrich Eduard Johannes Müller) (1824–1888), founder of the Miller Brewing Company in 1855

== N–Z ==
- Josef Neckermann (1912–1992), founder of the company Neckermann
- August Oetker (1862–1918), founder of the company Dr Oetker
- Adam Opel (1837–1895), founder of the automobile company Opel
- Franz Oppenheim (1852–1929), chemist, industrialist and entrepreneur
- Salomon Oppenheim (1772–1828), founder of bank Sal. Oppenheim
- Ernest Oppenheimer (1880–1957), diamond and gold mining entrepreneur, financier and philanthropist, who controlled De Beers and founded the Anglo American Corporation of South Africa
- Werner Otto (1909–2011), founder of Otto GmbH, now Otto Group, a mail order company
- Hasso Plattner (born 1944), co-founder of SAP
- Ferdinand Porsche (1875–1951), designer and founder of Porsche
- Günther Quandt (1881–1954), industrial, entrepreneur of different companies (today includes BMW and Altana (chemicals)
- Karl Friedrich Rapp (1882–1962), co-founder of Rapp Motorenwerke GmbH, which later became BMW
- Emil Rathenau (1838–1915), founder of AEG
- Paul Reuter (1816–1899), pioneer of telegraphy and news reporting; founder of Reuters news agency
- Hans Riegel Sr. (1893–1945), founder of Haribo, the manufacturer of gummi and jelly sweets
- Nathan Mayer Rothschild (1777–1836), founder of British company N M Rothschild & Sons
- Hugo Sack (1860-1909), cofounder of Sack & Kiesselbach and founder of Sack, GmbH
- Ernst Christian Friedrich Schering (1824–1889), founder of the pharmaceutical company Schering AG
- Gustav Schickedanz (1895–1977), founder of Quelle
- Anton Schlecker (born 1944), founder of Schlecker
- Ernst Schmidt and Wilhelm Schmidt-Ruthenbeck (1906–1988), founders of Metro AG
- Dieter Schwarz (born 1939), owner of Schwarz Gruppe
- Alex Seidel (1909–1989), co-founder of Heckler & Koch, 1948
- Fritz Sennheiser (1912–2010), founder of Sennheiser Electronic GmbH & Co. KG, specializing in high-fidelity products
- Georg von Siemens (1839–1901), co-founder of Deutsche Bank
- Werner von Siemens (1816–1892), inventor, founder of Siemens, the electronics and electrical engineering company
- Friedrich Soennecken (1848–1919), founder of Soennecken
- J.S. Staedtler, in 1835 founded Staedtler Mars GmbH & Co. KG, suppliers of writing, artist, and engineering drawing instruments
- Bruno Steinhoff (born 1937), founder of Steinhoff
- Henry E. Steinway (1797–1871), founder of the piano company Steinway & Sons
- Hugo Stinnes (1870–1924), co-founder of Rheinisch-Westfälisches Elektrizitätswerk AG
- August Storck-Oberwelland, in 1903 founder of Werther's Sugar Confectionery Factory, now Storck
- Franz Ströher (c. 1854–1936), in 1880 founded cosmetics company Wella
- Carl Tchilinghiryan (1910–1987), in 1949, co-founder of company Tchibo
- Carl von Thieme (1844–1924), founder of Allianz, a financial services company
- August Thyssen (1842–1926), founder of Walzwerk Thyssen & Co. in Mülheim an der Ruhr
- Friedrich Thyssen (1804–1877), founder of Draht-Fabrik-Compagnie in Aachen
- Hermann Tietz (1837–1907), founder of Hertie, a department store
- Klaus Tschira (1940–2015), co-founder of SAP
- Leopold Ullstein (1826–1899), founder of publishing company Ullstein Verlag
- Ernst Voss (1842–1920), in 1877, co-founder of Blohm+Voss, manufacturers of ships
- Carl Walther (1858–1915), founder of company Carl Walther, manufacturer of guns
- Moses Marcus Warburg and Gerson Warburg, co-founder of M. M. Warburg & Co., German bank
- Siegmund Warburg, founder of S. G. Warburg & Co., British bank
- Claus Wellenreuther (1935–2026), co-founder of SAP
- Bartholomeus V. Welser (1484–1561), Welser brothers bank
- Georg Wertheim (1857–1939), founder of Wertheim, a department store
- Aloys Wobben (1952–2021), founder of Enercon
- Reinhold Würth (born 1935), company Würth
- Carl Zeiss (1816–1888), founder of Zeiss, a maker of optical instruments
- Ferdinand von Zeppelin (1838–1917), inventor of the Zeppelin; founder of the Zeppelin Airship company
