= Bradford Shellhammer =

American entrepreneur and designer

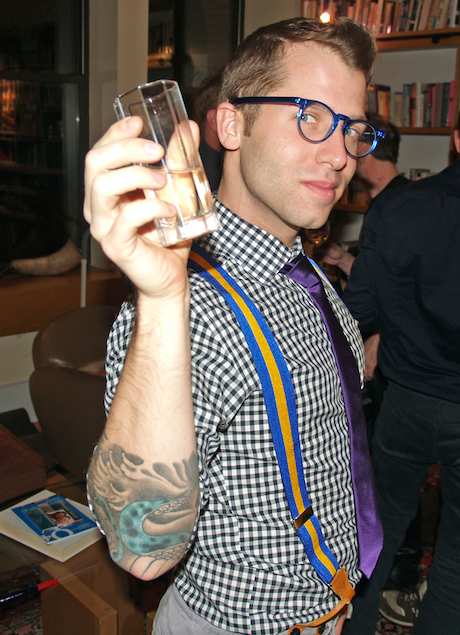
- Shellhammer on New Year's Eve 2009
- Born: 1976 (age 49–50); United States
- Education: Goucher College (B.A.); Parsons School of Design (A.A.S.)
- Occupations: Entrepreneur; designer
- Employer: eBay (2016–present)
- Known for: Queerty; Fab; Bezar
- Spouse: Georgi Balinov (m. 2013)
- Website: bradfordshellhammer.com

Bradford Shane Shellhammer (born 1976) is an American entrepreneur, designer, and tech executive who co-founded the e-commerce companies Fab and Bezar and the blog Queerty. Shellhammer was an admissions counselor at Fashion Institute of Design & Merchandising Museum and part-time fashion and nightlife blogger who became a writer for JC Report, A&F Quarterly, and Gay.com before becoming the founding editor of Queerty. In 2016 Shellhammer served as eBay's Chief Curator and later went one to become Vice President of Buyer Experience and the Chief Product Officer of Reverb.com, a subsidiary of Etsy. He also served as the Chief Marketing & Product Officer of Rent the Runway. He is currently the Chief Marketing Officer and Chief Product Officer at 1stDibs.

== Early life and education ==
Shellhammer was born in 1976 to Peg Kendall of Pasadena, Maryland, and Richard L. Shellhamer of Baltimore. He attended high school in Anne Arundel County and went on to study at Goucher College in Towson, Maryland, where he earned a bachelor's in communications and media studies in 1998. Later, Shellhammer received an associate degree in fashion design from Parsons School of Design.

== Early career ==
In 1999, Shellhammer met Jason Goldberg, with whom he would later become business partners, at Roxy NYC. Goldberg offered him the opportunity to be his assistant at his company in Silicon Valley. The two traveled to San Francisco, where Goldberg was studying at the Stanford Graduate School of Business. Both were laid off four months later. Shellhammer remained in San Francisco and worked as an admissions counselor at the Fashion Institute of Design & Merchandising.

Shellhammer also blogged about his experiences in fashion and nightlife. He wrote for an online magazine called JC Report where he observed and commented on fashion trends, as well as for A&F Quarterly, and The Baltimore Sun. In August 2005, he assisted in the founding of Queerty, an online magazine about trends and lifestyle within the gay community. Shellhammer also worked part-time at Design Within Reach (DWR) as a freelancer. Between 2008 and 2009, he worked for several furniture and design stores in SoHo, Manhattan.

== Involvement in Fab.com and subsequent projects ==
In 2010, Goldberg approached Shellhamer with the idea to launch Fabulis, a company that would serve as a social media network to provide travel advice and reviews to the young gay community. Shellhammer agreed to sign onto the project, and in February 2011, the company's name was shortened to Fab. During Shellhammer's tenure as chief design officer, Fab expanded rapidly and was valued at over $1 billion at its peak. By 2012, the site had over 10 million members and offered over seven million unique products.

Shellhammer left Fab in November 2013 and launched Shellhammer.co, a consulting company for business design, digital merchandising, and branding. He remains a stakeholder in and advisor to Fab. In 2014, Shellhammer became the chief design officer for the retailer Backcountry.com. In 2015, he founded Bezar and served as the company's chief executive officer. In 2016, Shellhammer was brought onto the executive team at eBay to serve as chief curation and merchandising officer.

== Personal life ==
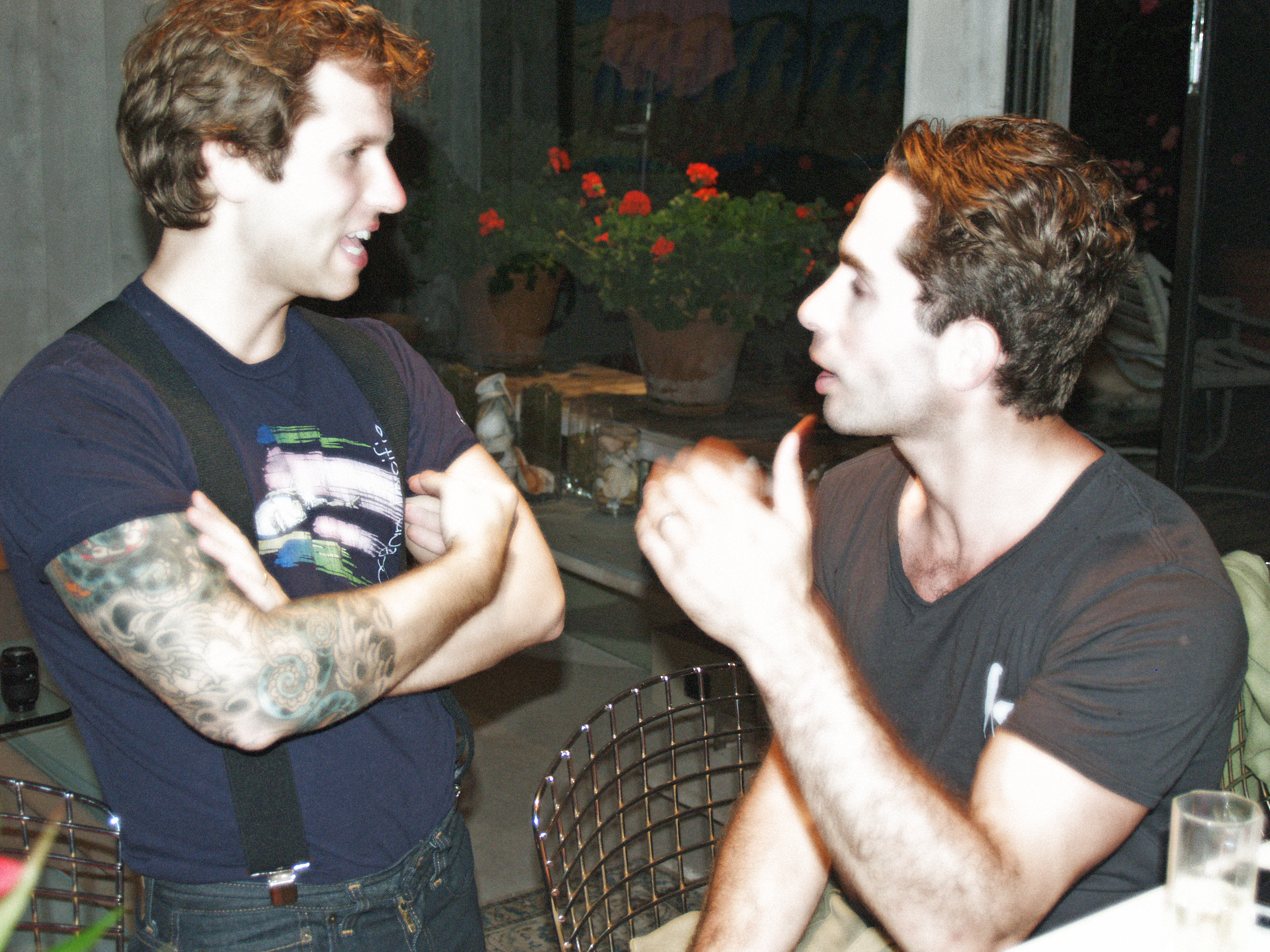
Shellhammer and Michael Lucas in 2009.

In March 2013, Shellhammer married partner Georgi Dimitrov Balinov, an investment banker at Barclays and a graduate of New York University. Actress and comedian Sandra Bernhard led the ceremony at New York's Russian Tea Room which also included performances by Billie Ray Martin, Marcella Detroit, Andy Bell of Erasure, and Latrice Royale. Lady Bunny was the DJ.

Shellhammer maintained a home in Sparrow Bush, New York and later Stuyvesant, New York. His weekend home and NYC apartment were both published in Architectural Digest. He is a noted art collector and was reported to have a number of Andy Warhol and Keith Haring pieces in his possession in 2017. Shellhammer's San Francisco home was featured in The Telegraph for its vibrant colors and "Warholian" interior design.

== Awards and honors ==
Fast Company magazine named Shellhammer one of the "100 Most Creative People in Business." He has had several profiles in the same publication under the same category. Forbes called Shellhammer the "King of Quirk." In 2016, Goucher, Shellhammer's alma mater, recognized him as a distinguished alumnus.

== See also ==
- LGBT culture in New York City
- List of LGBT people from New York City
- LGBT culture in San Francisco
