= Ronde (script) =

Sixteenth-century French script

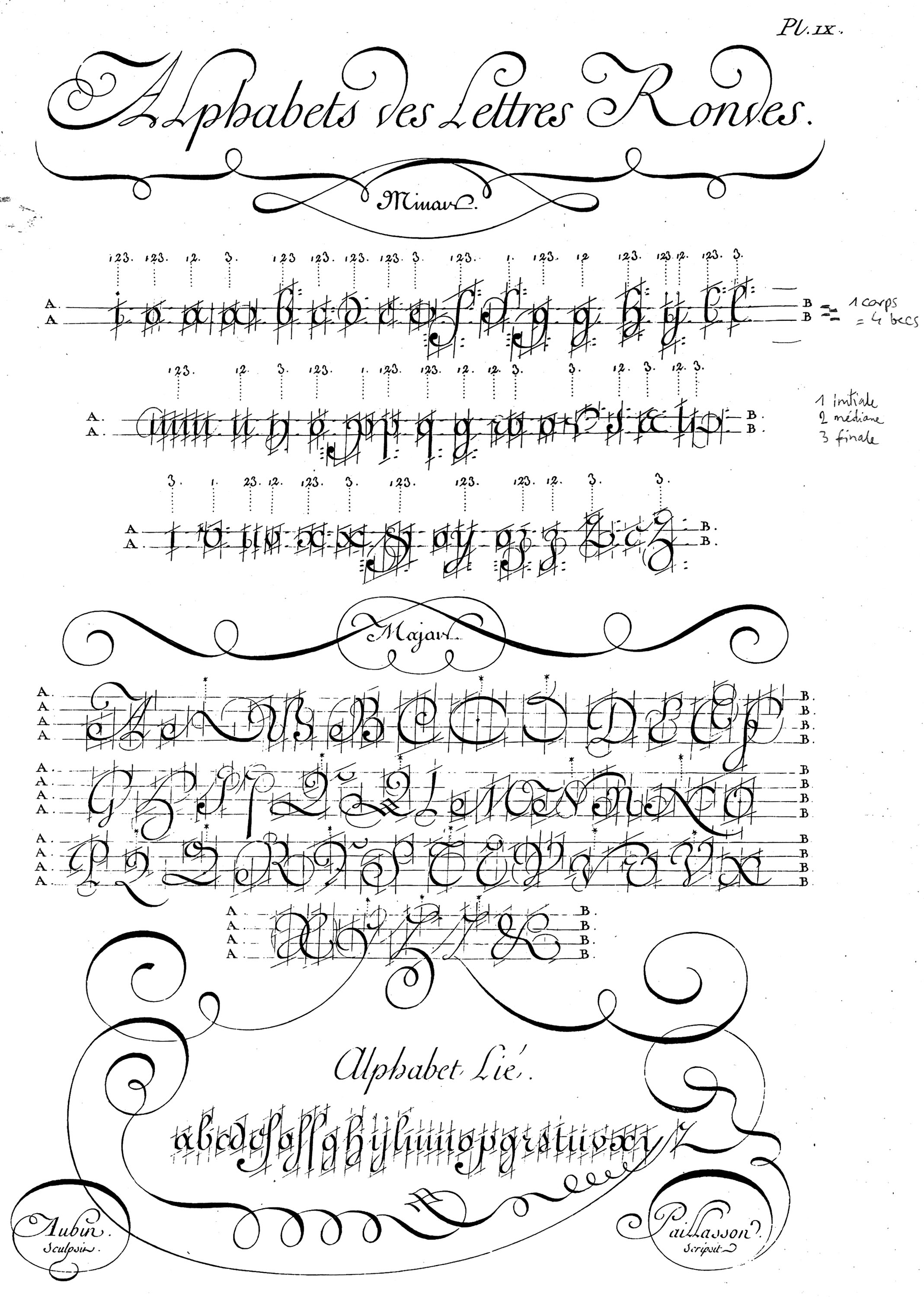
Alphabets des Lettres Rondes, bookplate on the Encyclopédie, by calligrapher Charles Paillasson

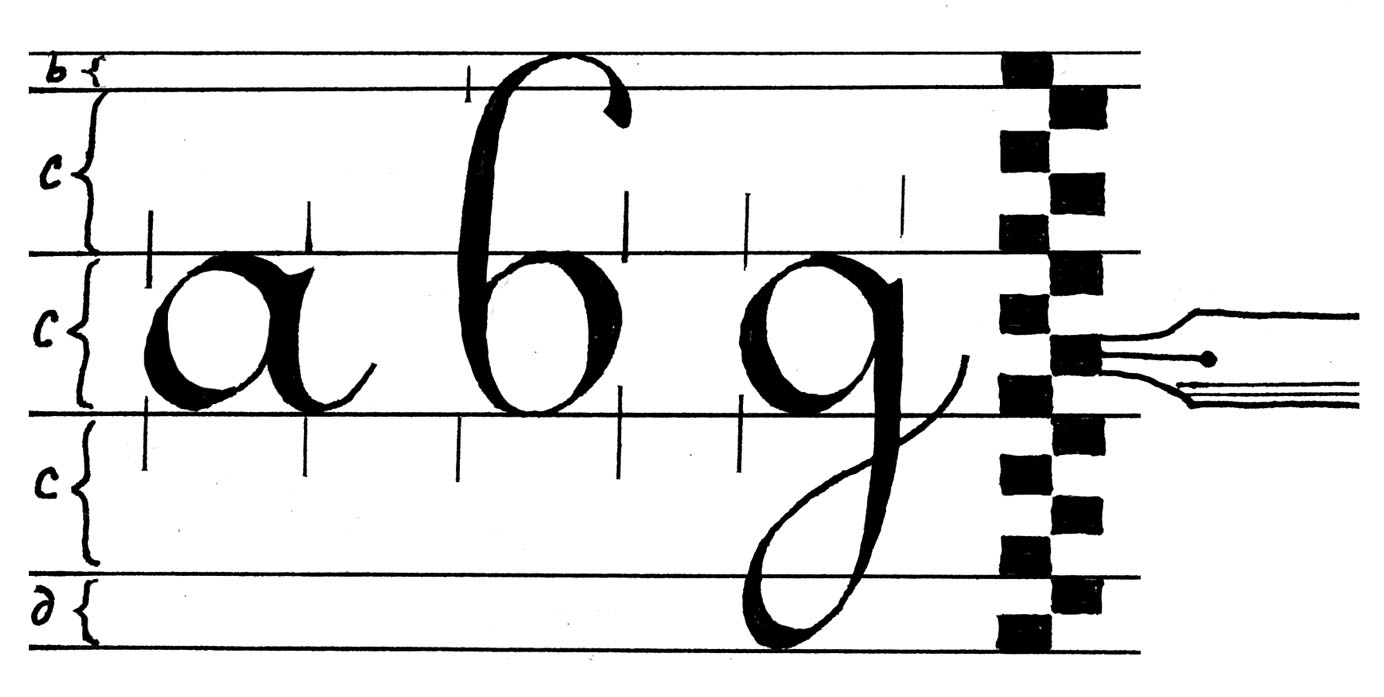
Proportions of ronde script

Ronde ('round' in French) or French round hand is a calligraphic script developed in France. Unlike other cursive scripts which are slanted and based on ovals, Ronde is upright and based on circles, giving the letters their round appearance.

It appeared in France at the end of the 16th century, growing out from a late local variant of Gothic cursive influenced by North Italian Renaissance scripts like Rotunda and Civilité. It was popularized by writing masters such as Louis Barbedor in the 17th century with his influential 1647 manual Les ecritures, financières et italien-bastarde.

While this style of writing fell out of popularity after the invention of a mass-produced pointed dip pen in the early 19th century, in the 1870s Friedrich Soennecken reintroduced it again (this time with a steel broad-nibbed pen) in the modified form of his Rundschrift. It was still in wide use until the 20th century because it was used in French school manuals to teach the bases of cursive writing, and was also commonly used by the scribes of the French Ministry of Finance until right after World War II, which gave this style the name of écriture ronde financière ('round financial writing', not to be confused with the financière writing style).

The classic French rondes were also present in the work of 18th century type founder and calligrapher Nicholas Gando, which has been revived for the digital medium by way of the French 111 font.

== See also ==
- Book hand
- Calligraphy
- Hand (writing style)
- Handwriting
- History of writing
- Palaeography
- Penmanship
