= Fab (website) =

American e-commerce company (2010-)

Fab.com, Fab
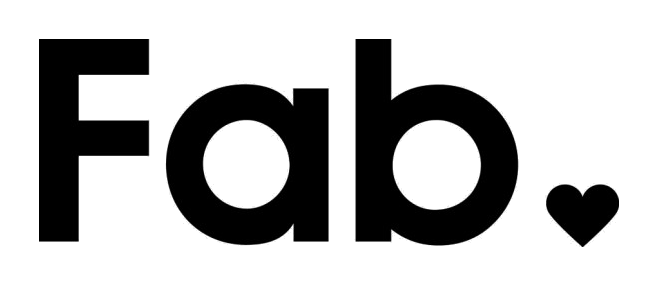
- Website type: Design, e-commerce
- Available in: English, German
- Creators: Jason Goldberg and Bradford Shellhammer
- Website: fab.com
- Registration: Optional
- Launched: June 9, 2011; 15 years ago
- Current status: Offline (as of December 2022)

Fab is an e-commerce company founded in 2010. Once estimated at a worth of over $1 billion, in March 2015, the digital and ecommerce assets of Fab were acquired by PCH International for an undisclosed sum and has since been relaunched as a new entity with no interaction from the original founders.

It grew from 175,000 members in June 2011, to over 10 million as of December 2012. As of April 30, 2013, Fab disclosed it received 6 million unique visitors per month and had sold over seven million products since launch. Fab was originally headquartered in Manhattan and operated a warehouse in Keasbey, New Jersey. The company once had office locations in Pune (India), and Berlin.

By April 2019, the website had pivoted to selling health and fitness products and was owned by Irish ecommerce marketer John Larkin. The site hasn't been online since late December 2022 according to the Internet Archive. The domain is now for Fab, a digital asset marketplace by Epic Games.

In 2024, Epic Games launched Fab as a digital asset marketplace, merging the Unreal Engine Marketplace, Sketchfab Store, Quixel, and ArtStation Marketplace. The platform offers an 88% revenue share and will expand to include Roblox, Minecraft assets, and MetaHumans.

== History ==
Fab was founded in February 2010 by Jason Goldberg (formerly of XING AG and Jobster) and chief designer Bradford Shellhammer. The pair had previously founded Fabulis which was a social network for gay men and their friends before pivoting on June 9, 2011 into Fab, with its model of daily design inspirations and sales. In November 2011, five months after re-launching, Fab reached 1 million members. The company reached this number faster than Facebook, Twitter and Groupon. In September 2012, Fab removed the membership requirements to browse the site. In December 2012, Fab passed 10 million members, up from 7.5 million members in September. Fab also announced it had sold more than 4.3 million products since its launch, averaging 5.4 products sold per minute. In July 2013, Fab eliminated 100 positions at its Berlin office as a profit-building measure. Fab laid off 101 more staff, primarily at its New York City office in October 2013, further reducing their workforce by 19 percent.

In September 2014, Fab launched a sister website Hem, a design site offering customized furniture designs.

In 2014, Bradford Shellhammer left his role as chief design officer to create his own curated design marketplace, Bezar.

=== Acquisitions ===
Fab made its first acquisition in January 2012 when it purchased independent fashion retailer FashionStake. In February 2012, Fab purchased German flash sales website Casacanda, founded by Roman Kirsch in 2011. Four months later the company acquired UK-based online design retailer Llustre. In June 2014, Fab acquired Finnish e-retailer One Nordic Furniture for an undisclosed sum paid in cash and stock.

=== Social commerce ===
Fab promoted social commerce. The company maintained an Inspiration Wall where members could upload and share design inspirations. In December 2011, Fab introduced its “Live Feed”, which enables users to share what they are buying, liking, and tweeting on Fab.com. In January 2012, Fab was among Facebook's initial partners as part of its integration of social tools through the Facebook Timeline. The company also employed a mobile first strategy with its digital products, with an emphasis on iPad and iPhone, and released a custom mobile app in October 2012.

== Funding ==
Less than two months after launching in June 2011 Fab secured an $8 million funding round led by Menlo Ventures with existing investors including First Round Capital, Baroda Ventures, The Washington Post, Founder and CEO Jason Goldberg, SoftTech VC, SV Angel, Ashton Kutcher, Guy Oseary and A-Grade Investments, and Zelkova Ventures also participating. In December 2011, Fab.com raised a $40 million round of funding led by investment firm Andreessen Horowitz, bringing its total funding to over $51 million.

Fab's largest round of funding, $105 million, occurred shortly after its 1-year anniversary in July 2012. The Series C round was led by Atomico with the following previous investors also participating: Andreessen Horowitz, Menlo Ventures, First Round Capital, Baroda Ventures, ru-Net Technology Partners (RTP), Pinnacle Ventures, Izurium Capital, Docomo Capital, and Mayfield Fund.
