= Manguinhos, Serra =

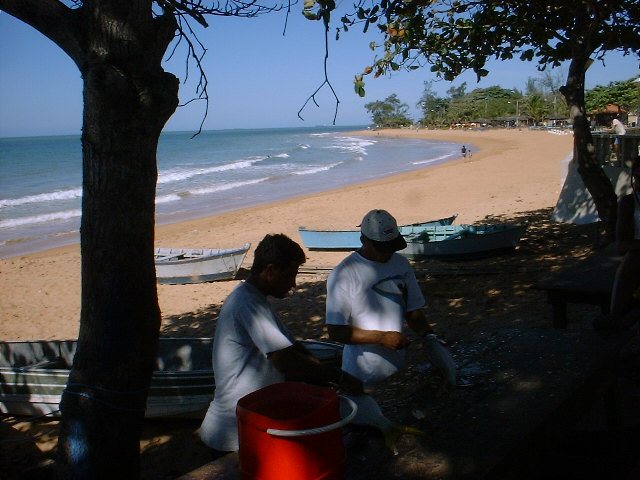
Fisher's Market under trees at beach in Manguinhos.

Manguinhos is a small village in the municipality of Serra in Espírito Santo, Brazil, technically known as a neighbourhood (Bairro in Portuguese). It is today mainly a residential village, as most people work in the Greater Vitória Metropolitan Area. Manguinhos is about 10 km north of Vitória.

In 2000, the Manguinhos campus of UCL – Faculdade do Centro Leste was founded by faculty from the Federal University of Espírito Santo (UFES). The college was acquired by the University of Vila Velha (UVV) in 2024.

== History ==
The first mention of the area is said to have been made by Augustin Saint-Hilaire around 1818. While on one of his trips he went to Espirito Santo and refers to the ponta dos Fachos, which is the name of a beach in Manguinhos to this day.

The locality was founded as a fishing village around 1900. During a number of decades, the fish that was caught off the coast were taken to the capital, Vitória, by canoe, until much later in the middle of the century, when better roads made it possible to transport them in small trucks. It remained a fishing village until the late 20th century, when in rapid succession seven farms were granted planning permission to be sold off as land allotments in an urban development. Electricity first arrived to Manguinhos in the 1950s, when there was already better road communication with the nearby capital (then 30 km away). The approved plans are still not fully built out, but the village size is steadily and rapidly increasing.

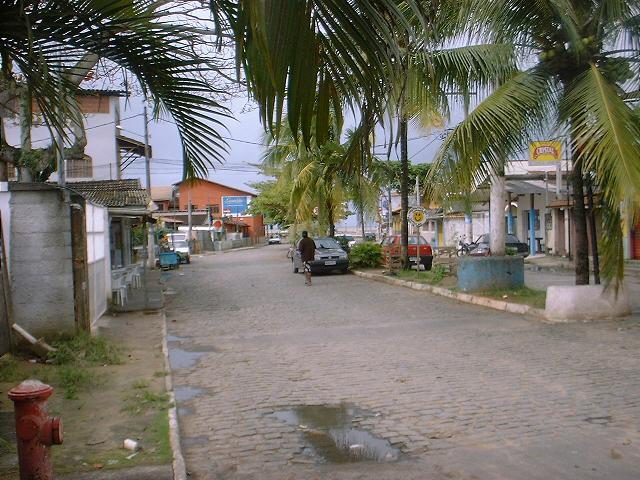
Downtown Manguinhos.

== Present ==
Today this residential village is a sea resort, with a large intermittent population who only live there in summer months. Local facilities have been able to cope well with this so far, despite some water shortages in the peak summer season. The local community is diversifying to attract tourists in the months between summers and create a more sustainable flow of visitors. Many beach-side bars have been built, and the town also sports one of the best traditional Moqueca Capixaba restaurants in the state. The continuing fishing activity, provides the fish that continues to be an attraction of local tourists and visitors.
