= Jacaraípe, Espírito Santo =

Jacaraípe
- District
- Location within Brazil
- Coordinates: 20.129079°S 40.208756°W

Jacaraípe is a district of Serra, a municipality of the Brazilian state of Espírito Santo. Considered part of the greater Vitória Region, it is now a suburb of Vitória, the state capital. Many of the streets in the center of town are named after Brazilian states. Jacaraípe was once a fishing village on the mouth of the Jacaraípe River, which is the run-off from Jacaraípe Lake, it has now grown into a large beachfront suburb.

Sports such as beach soccer, beach volleyball, surfing, bodyboard, paragliding, cycling and swimming are popular in the area.

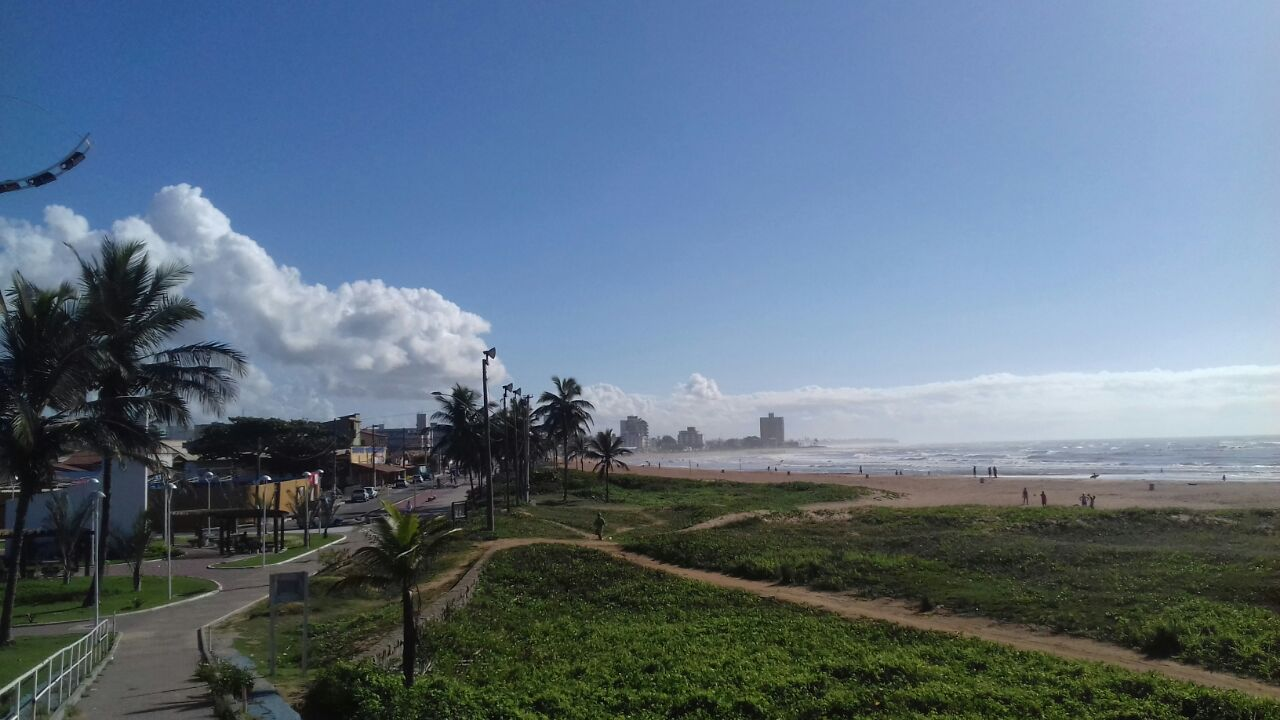
Jacaraípe Beach

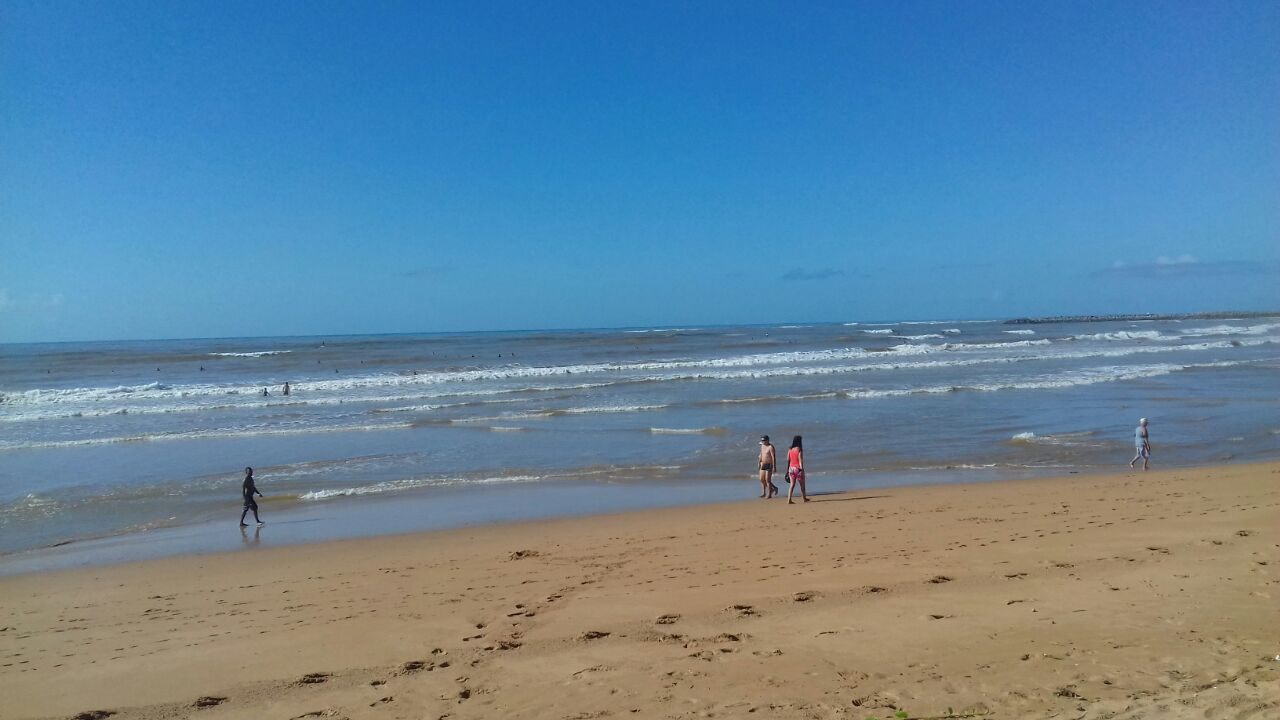
View of the sea from the beach

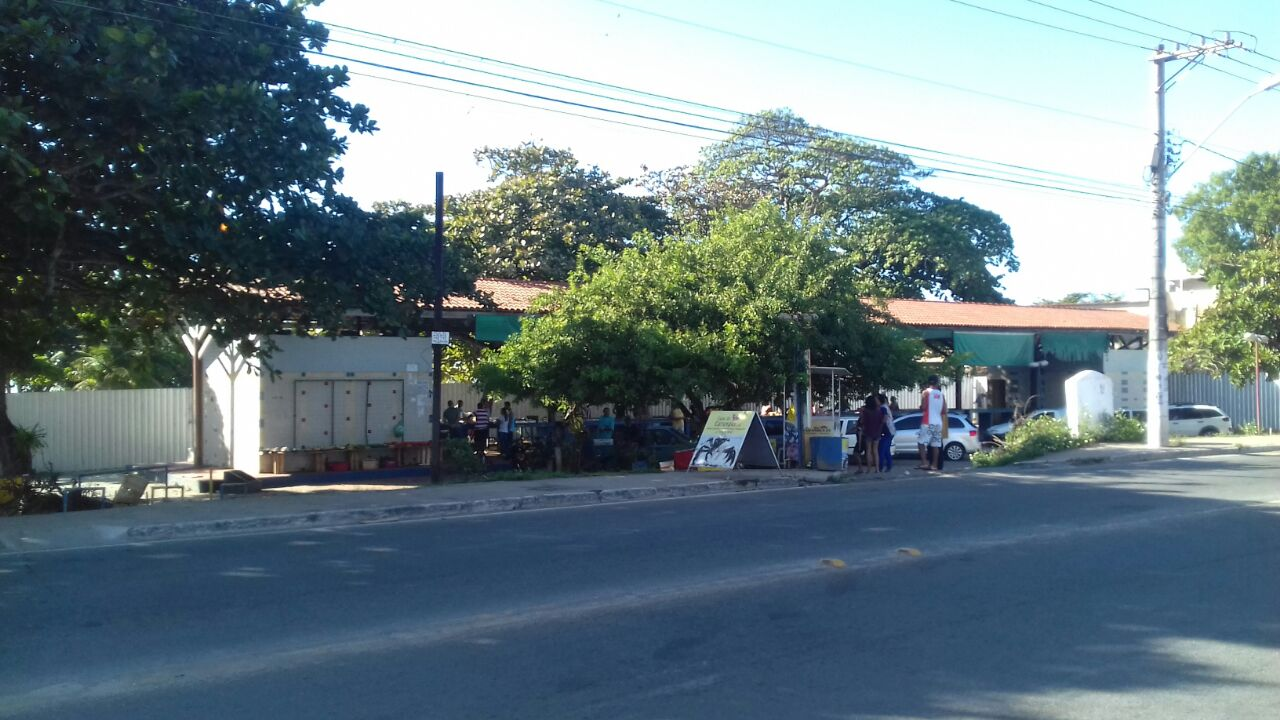
Local fish market

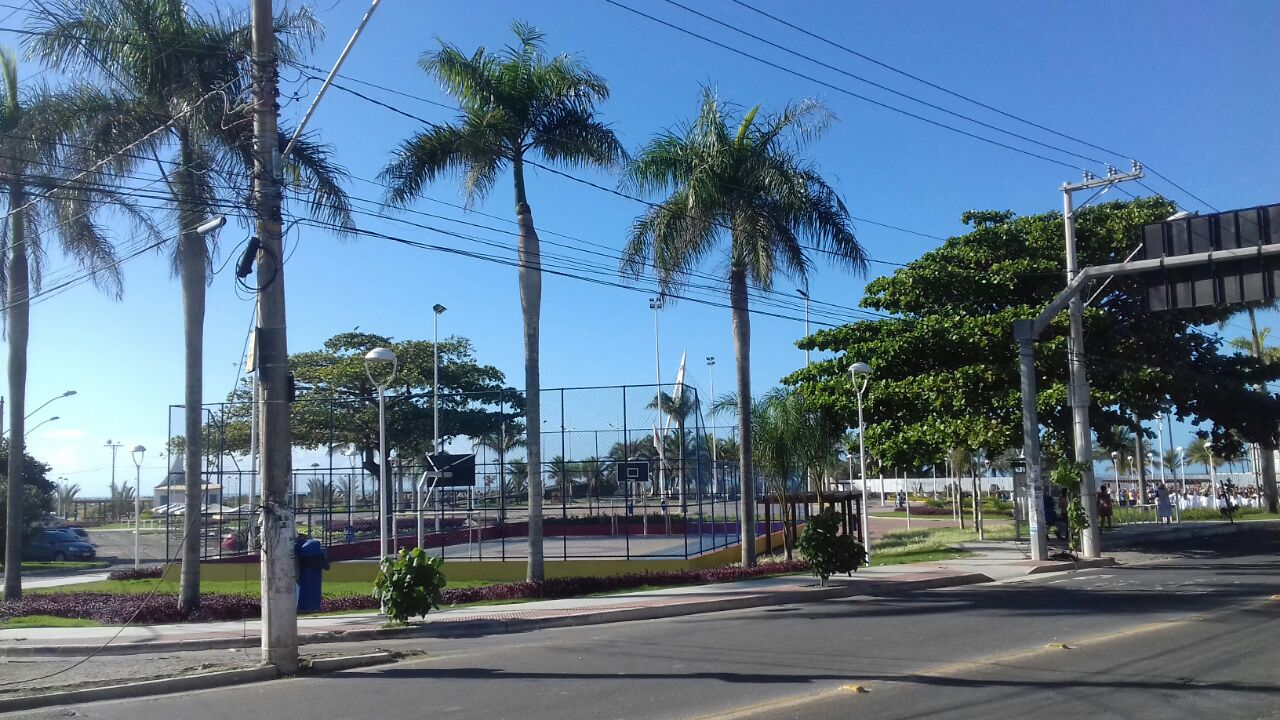
Praça Encontro das Águas square

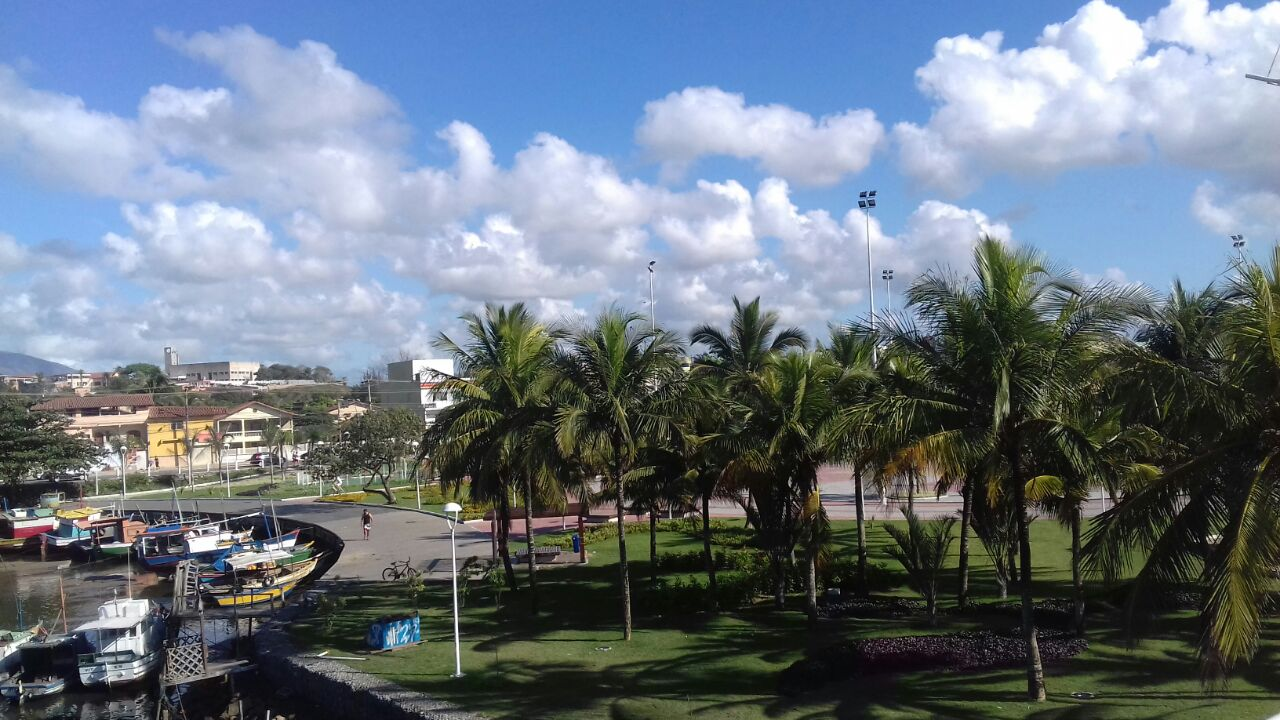
Nearby marina

Jacaraípe has a local artistic community, an Arts' Village called "Vila das Artes", where local artists display their arts. There, a variety of original sculptures made of repurposed materials are exhibited.
