= Izurium Capital =

Former British investment firm

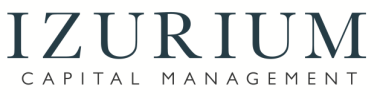
- Company type: Private
- Industry: Private Equity
- Founded: 2009
- Defunct: 2017
- Fate: Unknown dissolved
- Headquarters: London, United Kingdom
- Key people: Thomas Fort, Walter Bosco, Roman Mironchik
- Total assets: €300+ million
- Number of employees: 10+ investment professionals (2012)
- Website: www.izurium.com

Izurium Capital was a UK-based investment firm focused on private equity and special situations investment strategies. Izurium Capital was founded in December 2009 and stopped operating and was dissolved around 2017.

Prior to its demise it was headquartered in London, United Kingdom. Since its inception, the firm had raised over €300 million in committed capital.

The firm sought to invest in a variety of businesses with operations in Europe, the Americas, and Asia. The firm preferred businesses with a sizeable international presence outside their home market and with enterprise values ranging from €50 million to €500 million. The firm specialized in control investments, co-investments, leveraged buyouts, growth equity investments and sponsored mergers and acquisitions. The firm also provided mezzanine capital as part of its special situations strategy.

== History ==
Izurium Capital was founded in 2009. The founders of the firm came from private equity firms and hedge funds including Francisco Partners and Sisu Capital.

Izurium Capital invested in or purchased companies such as Dynacast, CapitalSpring, Emailvision, Fab.com, South American Silver Corp.
