= Roman Kirsch =

German serial entrepreneur and investor

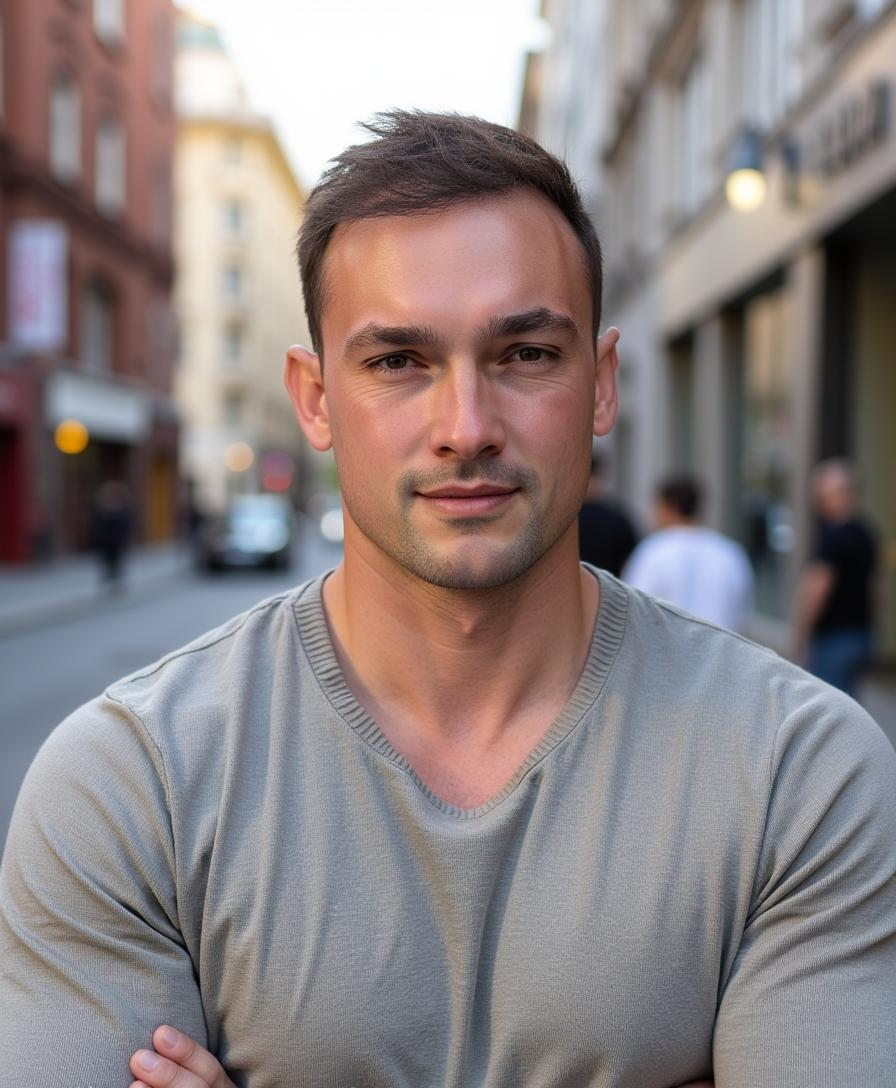
- Born: Roman Kirsch; July 3, 1988 (age 38); Almaty, Kazakhstan
- Education: WHU – Otto Beisheim School of Management; London School of Economics
- Occupation: Tech entrepreneur
- Years active: 2003–present
- Parent(s): Waldemar Kirsch and Helene Kirsch
- Website: romankirsch.com

Roman Kirsch is a German entrepreneur and investor in the tech- and consumer-internet-space.

== Early life and education ==
Kirsch holds a business degree from the German business school WHU – Otto Beisheim School of Management. He also has a Master of Science degree from the London School of Economics in Finance, Accounting and Management. He also spent time at the University of Southern California as well as the Indian Institute of Management Bangalore.

== Career ==
At the age of 13, Roman set up a business of importing watches from China. Later in 2003, at the age of 15, Kirsch founded his first company (a souvenir shop in Hamburg).

In 2011, Kirsch founded Casacanda, a furniture company that was acquired by Fab.com in February 2012, marking one of the quickest exits in tech history for an e-commerce startup and making Kirsch one of the youngest founders to achieve this milestone. He subsequently was CEO of Fab Europe until the end of 2012, during which he oversaw the company’s expansion and its rise to unicorn status with a valuation of $1 billion. Fab ultimately failed to sustain its growth and sold its remaining assets in a fire sale reportedly valued at just $15 million by 2015.

In 2013 Kirsch, alongside Matthias Wilrich and Robin Müller, founded the Berlin fashion startup Lesara with Kirsch as the CEO of the company. Despite rapid growth and recognition, such as being named Europe's fastest-growing tech company by The Next Web in 2016 and Germany's fastest-growing tech company by Deloitte in 2017, Lesara faced significant challenges. In November 2018, the company filed for insolvency after failing to secure a crucial €10 million bridge financing round.

Through his venture studio Rapid Pioneers Group, Kirsch has co-founded and invested in over 30 consumer tech and brand ventures across Europe. In 2012 Roman became the co-founder and investor of Amorelie, which grew into a leading female lingerie brand in Europe. In 2015 media company Pro7Sat1 acquired Amorelie, which is now valued at €100 million. He was the first investor and advisor in Instagram-native wellness brand Fitvia in 2015, which was 70% acquired by Dermapharm in 2019. Other founding investments include K-Beauty brand Yepoda, HR-tech firm Global Talent Co., and coupon platform Lumaly. The portfolio also includes green tech unicorn Enpal GmbH, as well as Bending Spoons, LAP Coffee, everdrop, and Wild Cosmetics.

In April 2021, Kirsch has raised $345m in an IPO on the NASDAQ stock exchange for the investment vehicle Tio Tech. Kirsch is CEO of Tio Tech. In April 2023, Tio Tech announced its shutdown after failing to complete a transaction within an agreed two-year deadline.

== Awards and recognition ==
- In January 2016, Forbes Magazine US listed Kirsch in its 30 under 30 Europe list for retail and e-commerce
- In 2017, the business magazine Capital listed Kirsch in its 40 under 40 list for young elites
- He is also a "Global Shaper" of the World Economic Forum Davos and a member of YPO
- In 2022, he was listed amongst the Top 50 Seed Investors in Europe by Business Insider.

== See also ==
- Agile retail
