= Serra, Espírito Santo =

Serra
- Municipality
- The Municipality of Serra
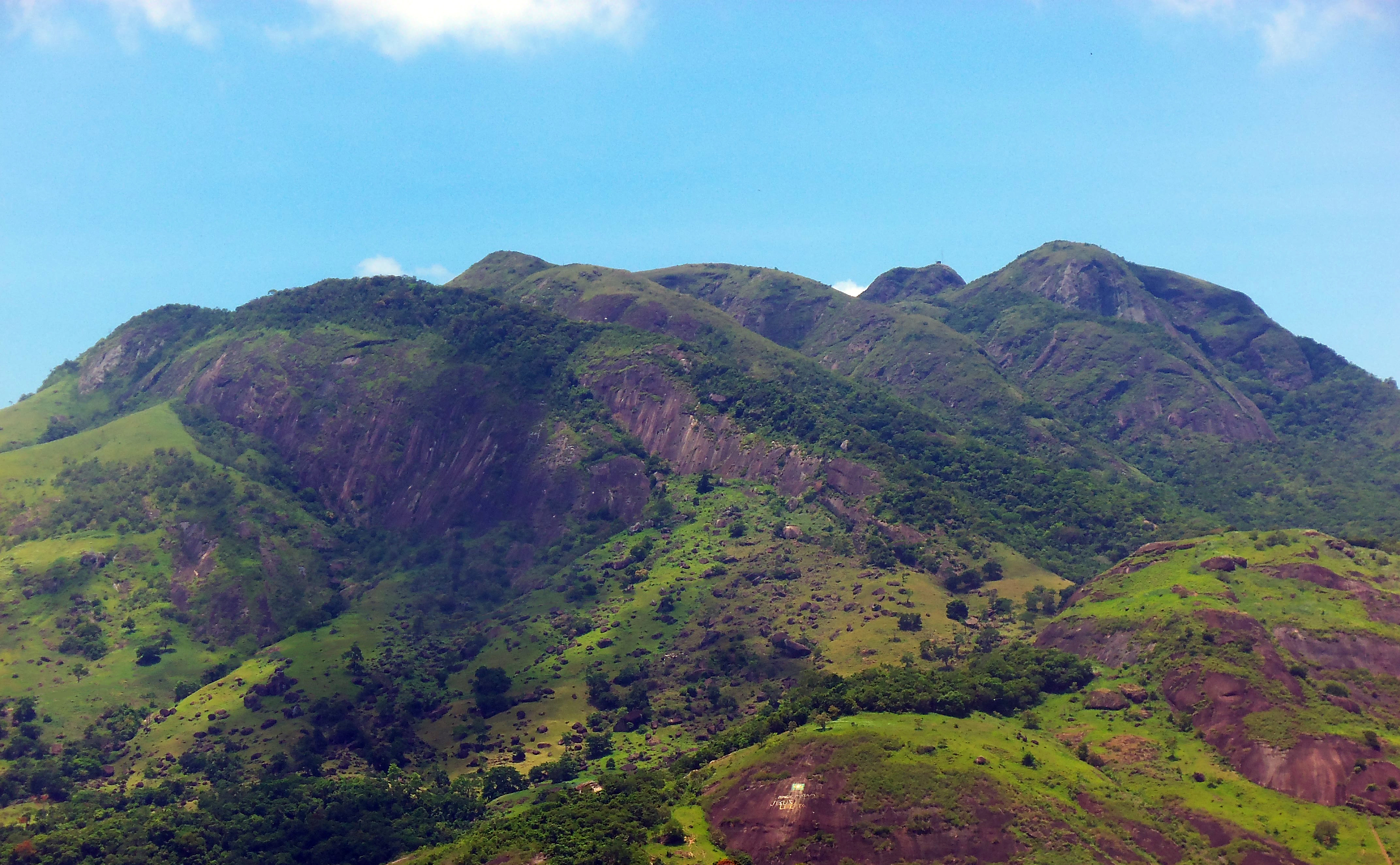
- The Mestre Álvaro seen the BR-101 between Planalto Serrano and Vista da Serra II

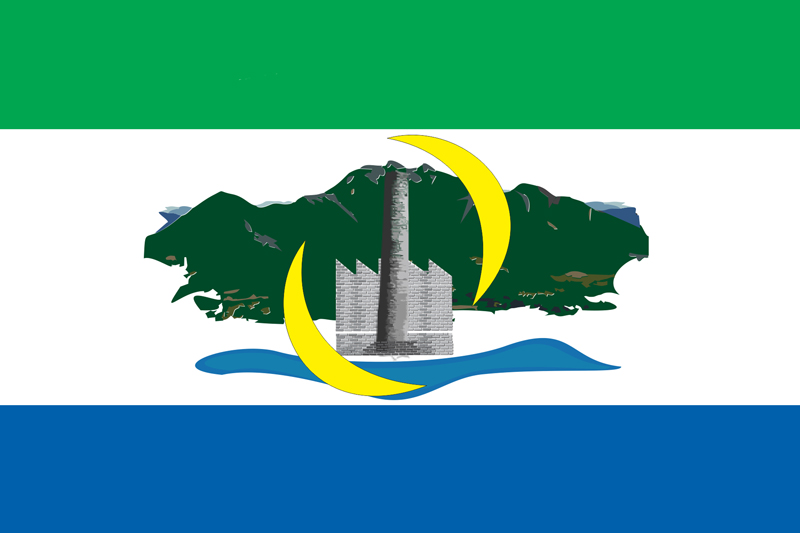
- Flag Coat of arms
- Nickname: Cidade das Montanhas
- Localization of Serra in Espirito Santo

- Localization of Serra, Espirito Santo in Brazil
- Coordinates: 20°07′44″S 40°18′28″W
- Country: Brazil
- Region: Southeast
- State: Espírito Santo
- Founded: November 6, 1556

Government
  - Mayor: Weverson

Area
  - Municipality: 553.254 km^{2} (213.613 sq mi)
- Elevation: 301 m (988 ft)

Population (2020)
  - Municipality: 520,653
  - Density: 941.074/km^{2} (2,437.37/sq mi)
  - Metro: Top
- Time zone: UTC−3 (BRT)
- Demonym: "serrano"

Serra (Portuguese pronunciation: [ˈsɛʁɐ]) is a municipality in the state of Espírito Santo, Brazil. Bordering the north of the state's capital, Vitória, the municipality is part of the Greater Vitória metropolitan area. Its population was 520,653 (2022) and its area is 548 km^{2} (212 sq mi). It is the most populous municipality in the state, ahead of the capital.

Serra, the seat of the municipality, is to the north of the characteristic Mestre Álvaro mountain which juts out of the coastal lowlands, and which is said to look like a small mountain range or "serra", in Portuguese, which is where the town and municipality got its name.

== Culture ==
Among the municipality's cultural attractions, several institutions stand out. One of the main cultural conservation sites is the Serra Historical Museum, opened in 2007 in the mansion that once belonged to the family of Judith Leão Castello Ribeiro, the first woman to become a representative in Brazil. The collection includes documents, furniture, objects (such as pipes, binoculars, and mirrors), works of art, and items related to the history of its illustrious residents and the constitution of the municipality.

Another renowned institution is the Casa de Congo, an important institution in the state of Espírito Santo, inaugurated in 2000 by the Secretariat of Culture (Secult), which aims to bring together the collection and memory of Congo in the municipality.

The municipality also boasts two municipal libraries, in addition to the library affiliated with the Municipal Council, a mobile library, and two community-based libraries, that is, independent of the state government and without ties to the private sector.

== Politics ==
Serra has five districts (distritos): Serra-Capital (or Serra-Sede), Carapina, Calogi, Nova Almeida and Queimado. Among those districts there are 118 neighbourhoods (bairros).

Another important urban area is that of Jacaraípe, on the coast 20 km north of Vitória. Jacaraípe is very well known for surfing championships, and is a weekend beach used by capital dwellers. Other smaller fishing villages such as Manguinhos are also close enough for day trips and are popular destinations for the locals.

The coastline of the municipality is protected in part by the 112,545 hectares (278,100 acres) Costa das Algas Environmental Protection Area, created in 2010.

=== Neighbourhoods of Serra ===
- Alphaville Jacuhy
- André Carloni
- Alterosas
- Bairro das Laranjeiras
- Bairro de Fátima
- Balneário de Carapebus
- Barcelona
- Barro Branco
- Belvedere-Muribeca
- Bicanga
- Boa Vista I
- Boa Vista II
- Boa Vista de Nova Almeida
- Boulevard Lagoa
- Camará
- Campinho da Serra I
- Campinho da Serra II
- Cantinho do Céu
- Carapina Grande
- Cascata
- Castelândia
- Central Carapina
- Chácara Parreiral
- Cidade Continental Setor África
- Cidade Continental Setor América
- Cidade Continental Setor Ásia
- Cidade Continental Setor Europa
- Cidade Continental Setor Oceania
- Cidade Nova da Serra
- Cidade Pomar
- CIVIT I
- CIVIT II
- Colina de Laranjeiras
- Colina da Serra
- Conjunto Carapina I
- Costa Bela
- Costa Dourada
- Diamantina
- Divinópolis
- Eldorado
- Enseada de Jacaraípe
- Estância Monazítica
- Eurico Salles
- Feu Rosa
- Guaraciaba
- Hélio Ferraz
- Jacaraípe
- Jardim Atlântico
- Jardim Bela Vista
- Jardim Carapina
- Jardim da Serra
- Jardim Guanabara
- Jardim Limoeiro
- Jardim Primavera
- Jardim Tropical
- José de Anchieta I
- José de Anchieta II
- José de Anchieta III
- Lagoa de Carapebus
- Laranjeiras Velha
- Mata da Serra
- Manguinhos
- Manoel Plaza
- Marbella
- Maria Níobe
- Maringá
- Morada de Laranjeiras
- Nova Almeida
- Nova Almeida Centro
- Nova Carapina I
- Nova Carapina II
- Novo Horizonte
- Novo Porto Canoa
- Ourimar
- Parque das Gaivotas
- Parque Jacaraípe
- Parque Santa Fé
- Parque Residencial de Laranjeiras
- Parque Residencial Mestre Álvaro
- Parque Residencial Nova Almeida
- Parque Residencial de Tubarão
- Piracema
- Pitanga
- Planalto de Carapina
- Planalto Serrano Bloco A
- Planalto Serrano Bloco B
- Planalto Serrano Bloco C
- Planície da Serra
- Portal de Jacaraípe
- Porto Canoa
- Porto Dourado
- Praia da Baleia
- Praia de Capuba
- Praia de Carapebus
- Praiamar
- Reis Magos
- Residencial Centro da Serra
- Residencial Jacaraipe
- Residencial Vista do Mestre
- Rosário de Fátima
- Santa Luzia
- Santiago da Serra
- Santo Antonio
- São Diogo I
- São Diogo II
- São Francisco
- São Geraldo
- São João
- São Judas Tadeu
- São Lourenço
- São Marcos I
- São Marcos II
- São Marcos III
- São Patrício
- Serra Centro
- Serra Dourada I
- Serra Dourada II
- Serra Dourada III
- Serramar
- Taquara I
- Taquara II
- Terminal Industrial Multimodal da Serra (TIMS)
- Tubarão
- Valparaíso
- Vila Nova de Colares
- Vista da Serra I
- Vista da Serra II
