= Jason Goldberg (entrepreneur) =

American entrepreneur

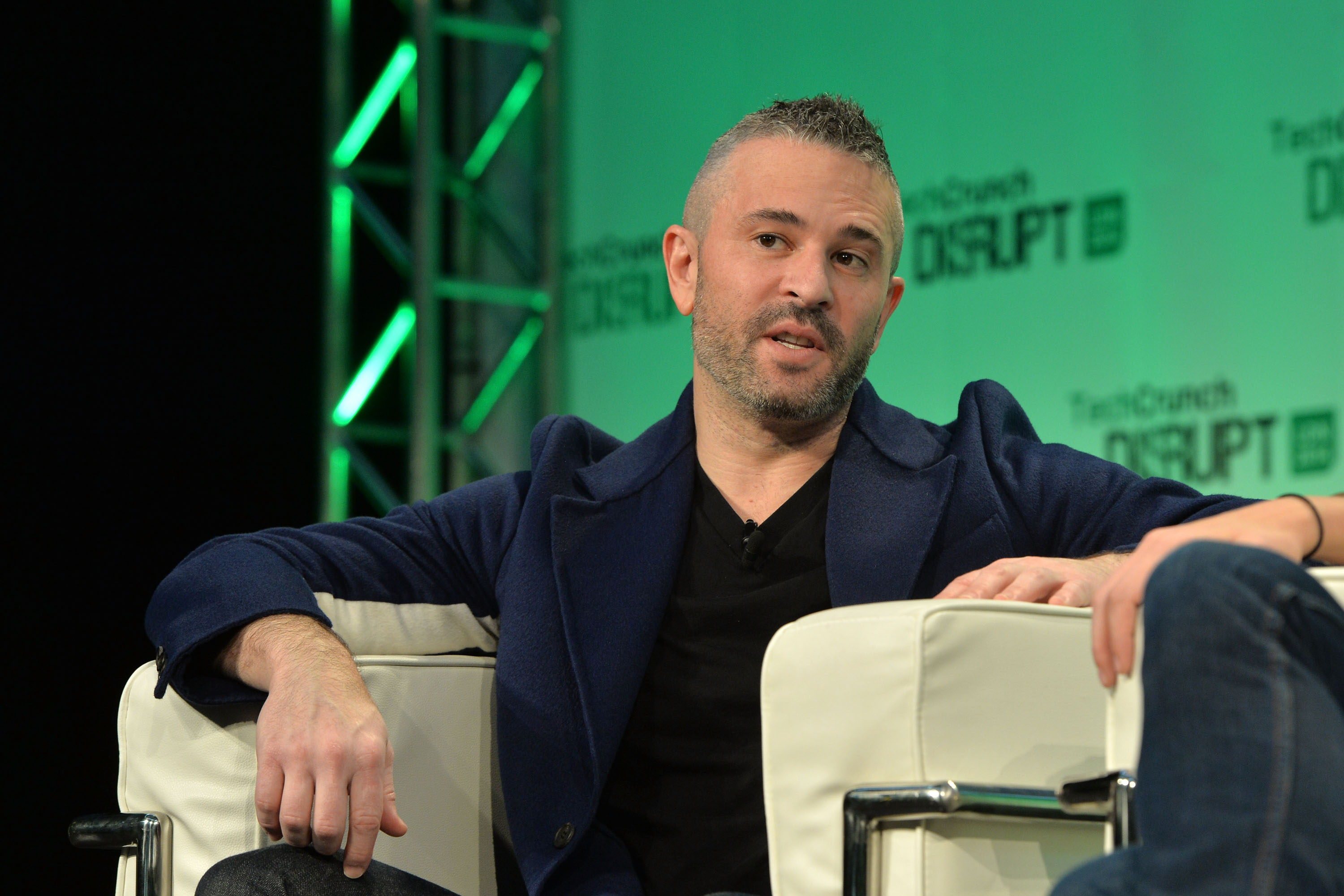
- Jason Goldberg in 2014
- Occupation: Entrepreneur
- Spouse: Christian Friedhelm Schoenherr (m. 2012)

Jason Goldberg is an American internet entrepreneur. He is currently the Director and CEO of Simple Token and CEO of Pepo. Prior to this, he served as the Co-founder and CEO of e-commerce sites Fab and Hem.

== Early life and education ==
Goldberg is from Rockville, Maryland.

He graduated from Emory University in 1993. In 2001, he received an MBA from Stanford Business School.

== Career ==
Goldberg left Emory University to work for the White House in the Office of Cabinet Affairs and then worked for Erskine Bowles, the chief of staff for US President Bill Clinton. He left politics for technology, developing digital strategies for AOL Time Warner and T-Mobile. In 2004, he founded Jobster, a job search engine that pivoted into a site to manage employee referrals. The site was a rival to LinkedIn. The company went through two "pivots" and was sold in 2006 for a fraction of its former value.

Goldberg launched Socialmedian in 2008, a social news aggregator, which he later sold to XING. In 2011, he launched Fabulis, a gay social network, with Bradford Shellhammer. Soon after, he pivoted the business to become a flash-sale furniture site and changed the name to Fab. Its focus was to aggregate designer products into one online marketplace. In 2014, Goldberg launched Hem, a furniture manufacturing company that doubles as an e-commerce site. In 2016, Goldberg launched Pepo, a social media app that connects users with experts in live messaging communities on various topics.

In 2017, Goldberg created Simple Token to bridge cryptocurrencies and mainstream consumer apps. Simple Token is a blockchain protocol for consumer companies to easily launch their own tokens, without the need to create and maintain new blockchains and token ecosystems. Goldberg came up with the idea for Simple Token when attempting to tokenize his social media app, Pepo. Pepo's development team found that the tokenization process was much more costly and complex than they had anticipated. From this, Goldberg began creating a technology that allows small to mid-size consumer companies to put part of their business onto a blockchain and tokenize without complex development requirements. Simple Token was set to launch a public token sale on November 14, 2017.

== Personal life ==
In August 2012, Goldberg married his boyfriend Christian Friedhelm Schoenherr in New York. Goldberg and his colleague Shellhammer served as best man at each other's weddings.
