= PCH International =

Irish logistics, supply chain, and packaging company

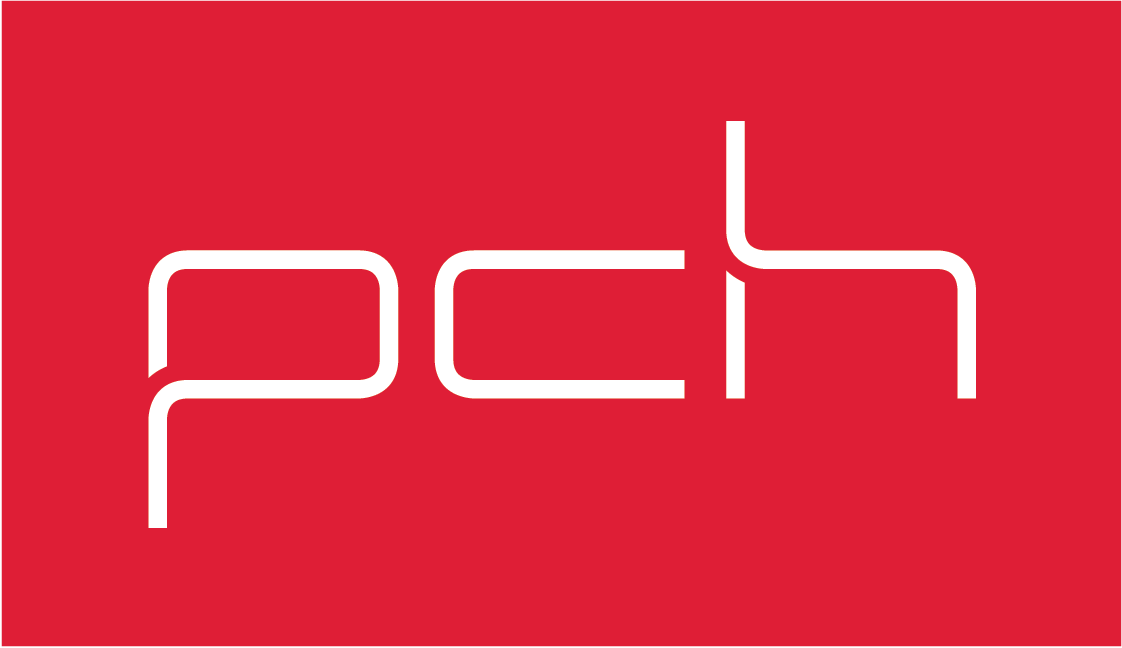
- Company type: Private
- Founded: 1996; 30 years ago in Ireland
- Founder: Liam Casey
- Headquarters: Cork (city), Ireland
- Revenue: US$1 billion (2014)
- Number of employees: 604 (2016)
- Website: pchintl.com

PCH is a global custom design manufacturing company that works with companies to design, engineer, develop, manufacture, pack out, fulfill and distribute products as well as manage supply chains. The company was founded in Ireland in 1996 by entrepreneur Liam Casey.

PCH's corporate headquarters are located in Cork, Ireland with operational headquarters in Shenzhen, China,

== Services ==
PCH offers product design engineering and development services as well as manufacturing, pack out and fulfillment, and distribution services. For startups, PCH had one division – Highway1 – that works with entrepreneurs to minimize the risk of market entrance and help them scale production.

PCH China Direct assists companies looking to export to China or expand existing operations. In late 2015, PCH International laid off 1,500 workers in China, nearly its entire workforce, as it moved away from mass production of products into more niche markets.

== Highway1 ==
In June 2013, PCH launched Highway1, a four-month accelerator program.

== Funding and expansion ==
On 7 June 2011, the company announced that it had raised a new round of funding of $30 million. Two new investors, Northbrooks Investments and J. Christopher Burch, and existing investors Norwest Venture Partners, Triangle Peak Partners, Cross Creek Capital, and Fung Capital participated in the round.

In 2011, the company acquired TNS Distribution, a European distributor of consumer electronics products and accessories for an immediate payment of €6m (US$8.67m) and an earnings-based payment of €5m (US$7.22m) over three years, based on the performance of TNS Distribution.

On 15 June 2012, the company announced an agreement to acquire Lime Lab Inc., a Silicon Valley–based product development consultancy.

On 3 March 2015, PCH announced that they had acquired Fab (website), a design e-commerce platform, for an undisclosed sum. The purchase price was later revealed to be $15 million, a huge drop in valuation for the distressed internet company.
