= Friedrich Soennecken =

German inventor

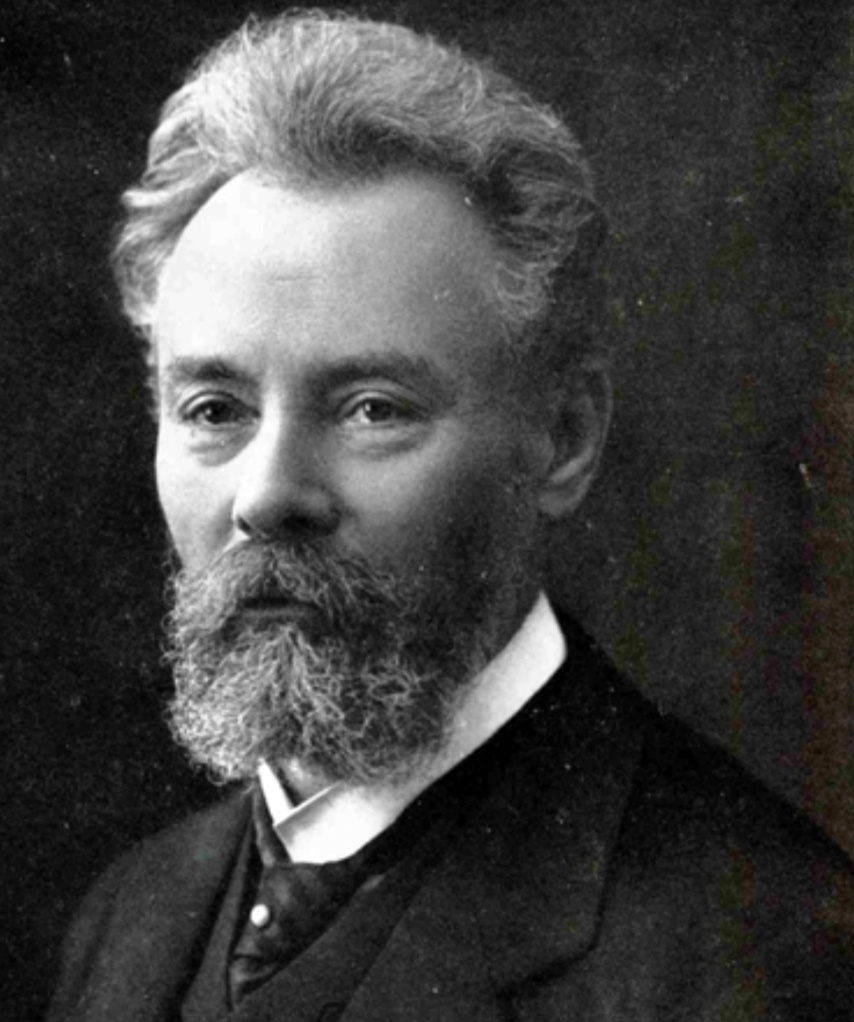
- Born: 20 September 1848; Iserlohn-Dröschede, Province of Westphalia, Kingdom of Prussia
- Died: 2 July 1919 (aged 70); Bonn, Rhine Province, Free State of Prussia, Weimar Republic
- Occupation(s): Entrepreneur, inventor, founder of Soennecken

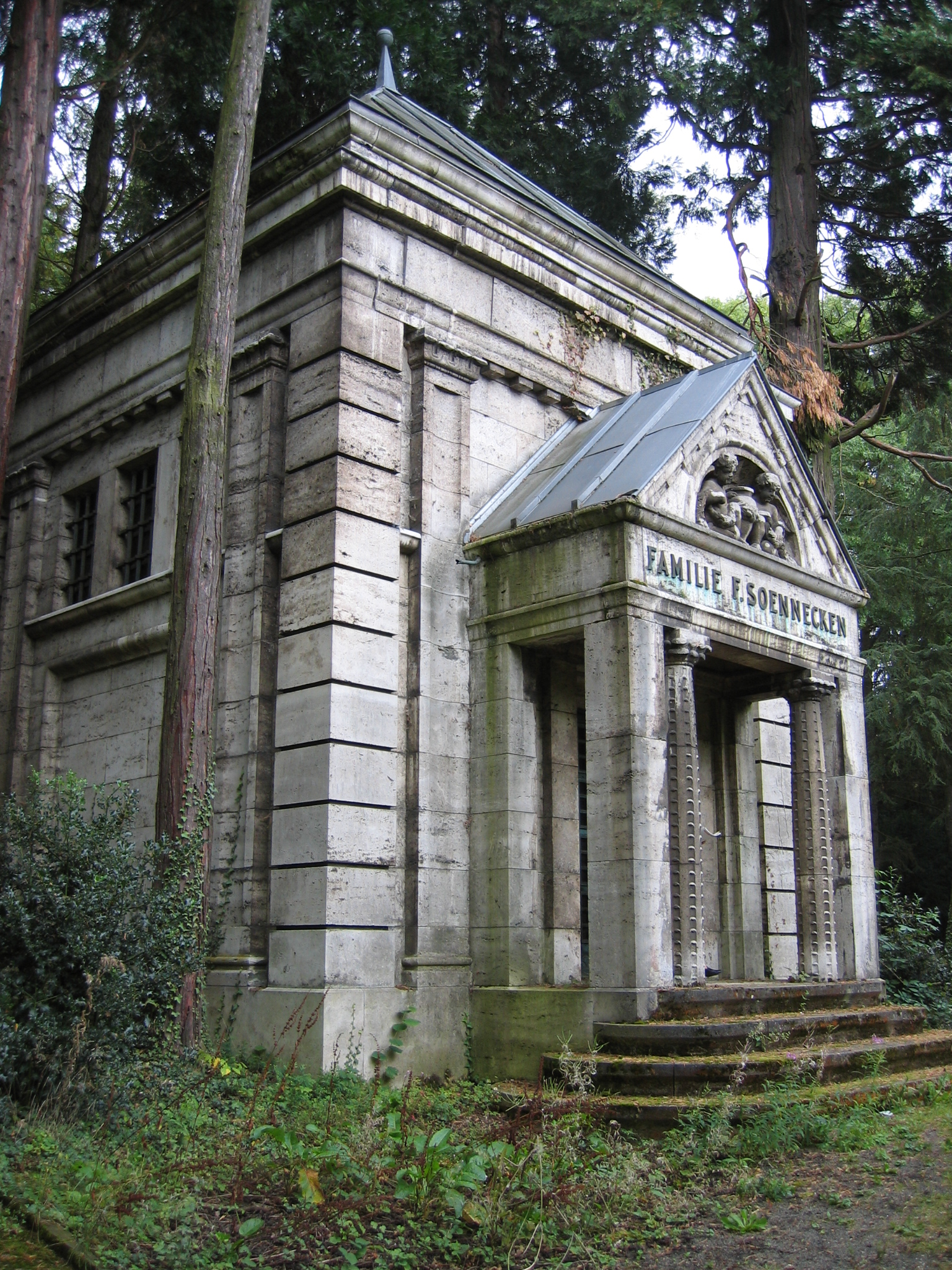
Mausolem Familie F. Soennecken

Friedrich Soennecken (20 September 1848 – 2 July 1919) was an entrepreneur and inventor. He was the founder of Soennecken, a German office supplier.

Soennecken was born in Iserlohn-Dröschede, Sauerland in 1848, the son of a blacksmith. On 27 May 1875 he founded the F. Soennecken Verlag, a commercial enterprise in Remscheid, Westphalia.

Soennecken's round script

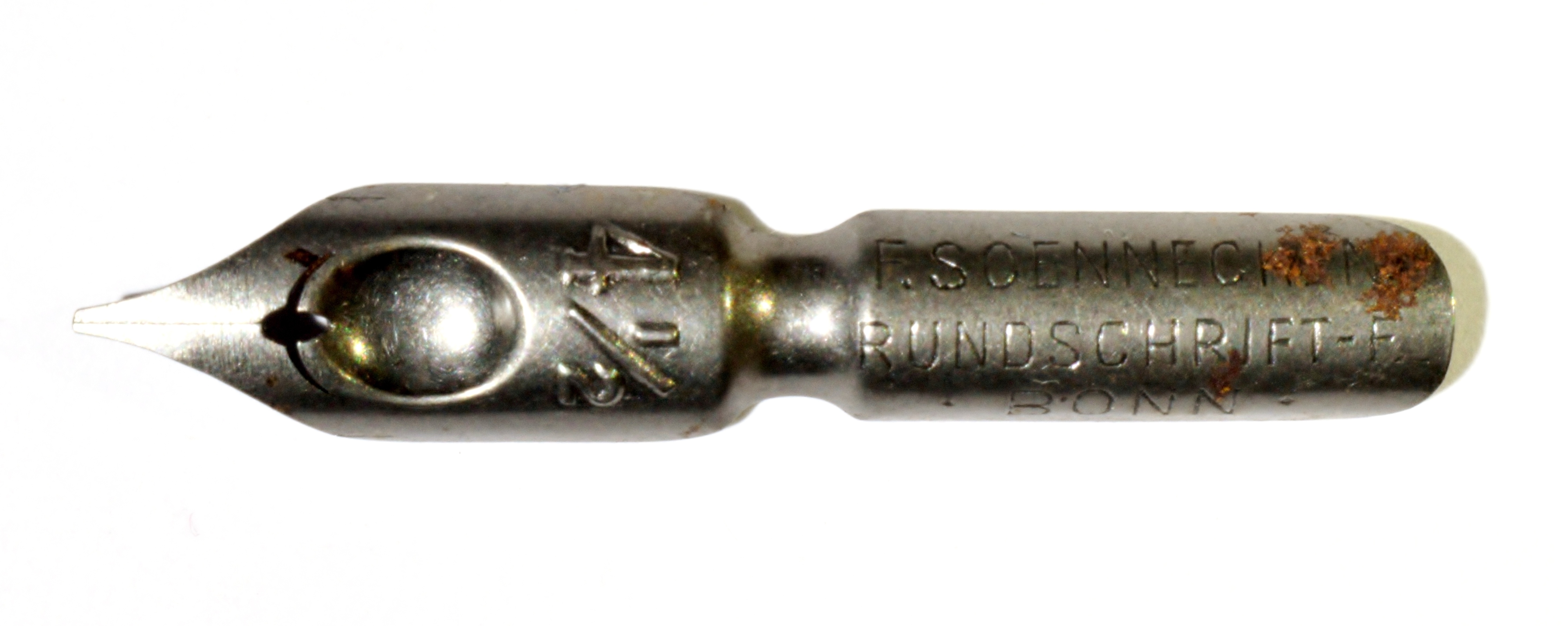
A pinched straight pen for Rundschrift produced by Soennecken

He is best known for the reintroduction of a Rundschrift (round script) style of calligraphy and the broad pen nib associated with it. Whilst ronde script rendered with quill originated in late 16th-century France and was widely used in the country throughout the 17th and 18th centuries, it fell out of popularity after the invention of the mass-produced pointed pen from steel in early 19th century.

Round writing was designed to be a visually appealing, standardized style of penmanship which was easy to learn and execute, and Soennecken published books on the topic in several languages. As a result, broad-nibbed pen (this time from steel) was popular again not just in Germany, but also in France, Russia and elsewhere; scribes of the French Ministry of Finance used it even until right after World War II.

In 1888, Friedrich Nietzsche wrote to a friend that he had finally discovered both a quality paper to write on and a quality pen from Germany: Soenneckens Rundschrift Federhalter.

Soennecken also introduced the two-hole punch and the ring binder. In 1876 he and his company relocated to Poppelsdorf, near Bonn, to be closer to the University which later awarded him the honorary title Dr. med. h. c..

Soennecken died in Bonn in 1919.

== Inventions ==
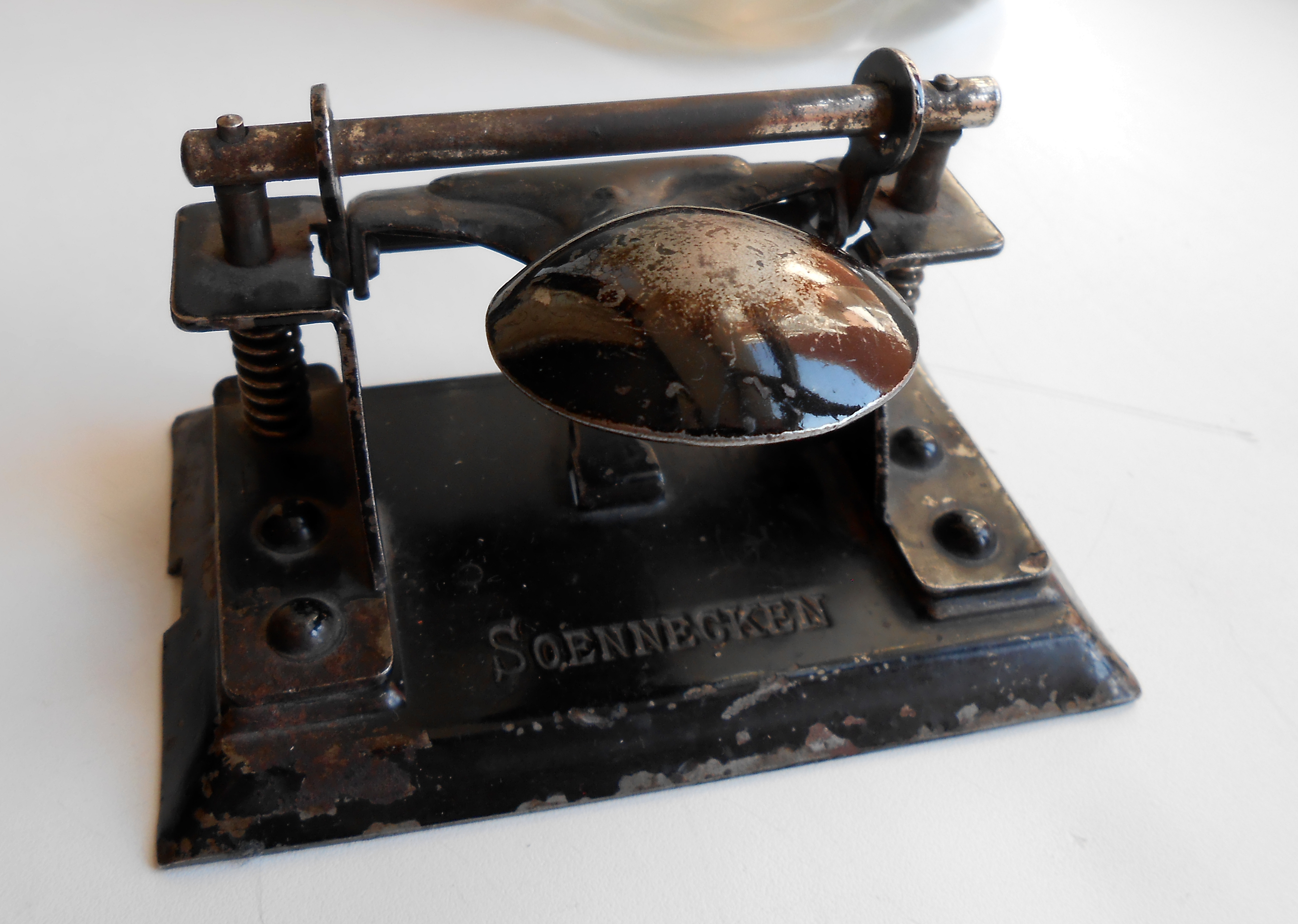
Hole punch

- Ink container with stable stand (invented as an apprentice)
- A style of writing with the round tip of the feather of a pen nib (1860)
- An early type of binder which later became the Soennecken file (1886)
- The hole punch
- The ring binder, later symbolically part of the logo of Soennecken

== Literature ==
- Hans Schreiber: Soennecken Alphabete No. 7 (Neue Rundschrift), Verlag Soennecken, Zurich, approx. 1930
