= Bezar =

American curated online design marketplace

Bezar.com, Bezar
- Website type: design, retail, e-commerce
- Available in: English
- Headquarters: 560 Broadway, New York, NY 10012
- Area served: United States
- Website: www.bezar.com
- Launched: March 17, 2015
- Current status: Acquired

Bezar was an American online design marketplace founded in 2015 by former Fab co-founder Bradford Shellhammer (CEO), Matt Baer (COO), PieterJan Mattan (Creative Director), and Justin Chen (CFO). The site featured unique pieces from both emerging designers and established brands in four categories: home, accessories, jewelry, and art. The company was headquartered in SoHo, Manhattan.

The name “Bezar” comes from a combination of the words bazaar and bizarre, which both are phonetically pronounced \bə-ˈzär\.

== History ==
In 2013, Bradford Shellhammer left his role as co-founder and chief design officer of ecommerce website Fab, maintaining a role as a shareholder and non-executive advisor.

In early 2015, Shellhammer announced he would launch and curate his own online design marketplace. Bezar launched in March 2015, featuring four new virtual pop-up shops daily, and a range of exclusive collaborations with designers, labels and brands like FLOS and Refinery29. Bezar's marketplace component, featuring hundreds of permanent designer storefronts, was rolled out in September 2015.

== Funding ==
Before its launch, Bezar raised a total of $2.25 million in two and a half weeks from seven investment funds and 20 individuals. Notable investors include designer Yves Béhar, Kenneth Lerer, Hiroshi Mikitani and Whoopi Goldberg.

== Acquisition ==
In February 2016, Bezar was acquired by online luxury goods retailer AHAlife Holdings, Ltd. (ASX:AHL)
