= Soennecken =

German office products manufacturer

Soennecken is a German office products manufacturer. Its products are well known in the United Kingdom, North America, Australia and also India. Founded by Friedrich Soennecken in 1875, the name was registered as a trademark in 1905. Soennecken is the synonym for the development of the pen, binder and the punch. Due to bankruptcy, the trademark is owned by the BRANION EG since 1973. Today the enterprise offers a variety of office products.

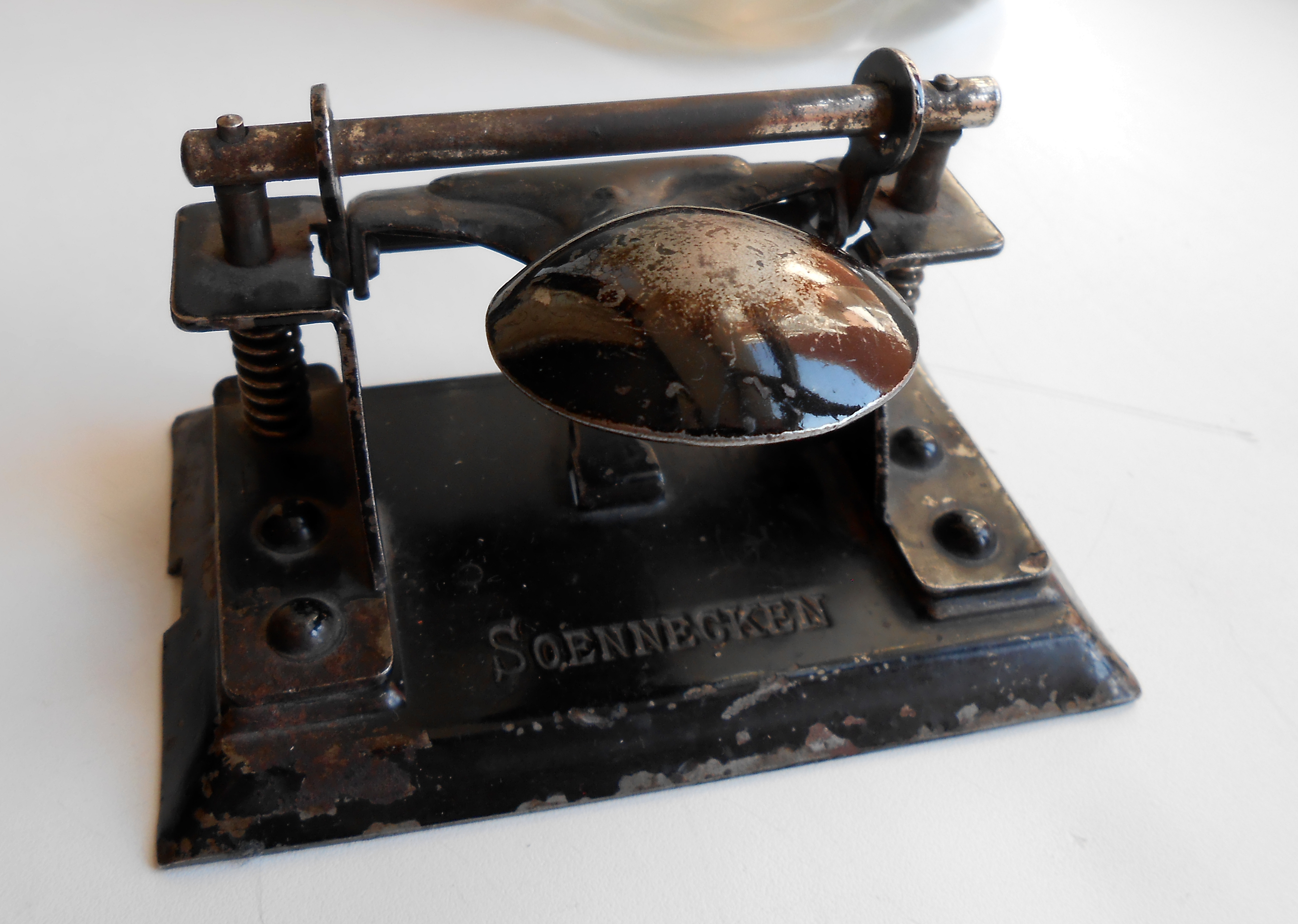
Hole punch

== Timeline ==
- 1883: Soennecken employs 30 workers and packman, acquisition of area from Poppelsdorf, now Bonn
- 1887: Extension of the factory
- 1896: A new building is inaugurated
- 1898: New building for furniture production
- 1903/1904: Completion furniture factory Soenneckenfeld
- 1909: New building in Poppelsdorf: Soenneckenfeld
- 1910: Participation at the World's Fair Brussels with awards
- 1911: Soenneckens son, Alfred Soennecken is active in the company
- Purchase of Shannon Zeiss registration department company Berlin
- 1913 export branches in Berlin, Leipzig, Amsterdam, Antwerp and Paris
- 72,000 goods packages are sent into all world
- Purchase of the feather/spring factory Schaper in Iserlohn
- 1919: Death of Friedrich Soennecken
- 1920s: Enterprise employs approx. 1000 coworkers
- 1973: Bankruptcy
- 1983: BRANION EG buys the exclusive trademark rights
