= Agile retail =

Retail model

Agile retail is a direct-to-consumer retail model that uses big data to try to predict trends, manage efficient production cycles, and faster turnaround on emerging styles. Agile retail applies concepts from Agile and Lean in the retail business, and aims to respond faster to customer needs. This retail model is used by Amazon. The concept turns e-commerce retailers into on-demand platforms that identify stock and deliver desired products directly to the consumer. The main focus of Agile retail is to identify trends that are popular with consumers at a given moment and deliver those products using Agile production concepts.

Experts in the fashion industry argue that Agile retail is the next step for fashion retail, especially with rising online sales. Agile Retail gives more options to customers, usually at a lower price, and delivers the product directly to them. Agile retail is a new form of fast fashion that applies the concepts of “Agile” and “Lean” in the fashion retail business. It is also all about serving customers better by aligning to their changing needs.

== History ==
The Agile ideology can be traced back to the Lean manufacturing principles developed at Toyota in the 1950s. Lean manufacturing focuses on eliminating waste in the manufacturing process. The basic intention is to maximize efficiency during manufacturing with a view to enhance productivity and lower costs. Back then, the Agile retail concept was applied mainly to the manufacturing of hard goods such as automobiles.

In recent years Agile retail, especially in the fashion industry, capitalizes on many of the principles that have made other stalwart tech companies successful in their respective industries.

In a traditional fashion company, a designer creates an entire collection usually based on his or her inspiration. The Germany-based online retailer Lesara has been using the concept of agile retail in the fashion industry.

== Processes ==
Agile retail uses big data to try to estimate what customers want and anticipate demand and quantities.

Agile retail companies are able to respond more quickly to changing circumstances using the data from this process. The aim is to know consumer needs at any given point. The Agile enterprise emphasizes iteration over perfection, the ability to move quickly and to constantly learn and adapt. Agile retail relies partially on traditional retailers, especially luxury retailers, in setting trends which are used as inspiration.

== See also ==
- Agile management
- Agile software development
- Fast fashion
