= Hugo Sack =

German engineer and industrialist

- Born: October 10, 1860; Loeben, Saxony, German Confederation
- Died: June 23, 1909 (aged 48); Offdilln, near Düsseldorf, German Empire
- Occupation(s): Engineer and industrialist
- Known for: Perfected a steel rolling-mill called the Sack mill

Hugo Sack (10 October 1860 – 23 June 1909) was a German engineer and industrialist. He founded two engineering companies and was an inventor of industrial machinery.

== Early life and education ==
Hugo Sack was born at Loeben, near Lützen, Saxony, in 1860, where his father, Rudolf Sack, owned an estate. In 1863 his family moved to Leipzig, where his father founded an engineering works for the manufacture of agricultural machinery, in which he gained his first practical experience as an engineer after completing his school education. He later went through a course of technical study in Mittweida and at the Karlsruhe Technical University.

In 1882 Sack returned to his father's works, but left soon after to take up work in Westphalia and the Rhine Province. He was subsequently commissioned by a British firm to erect a wire-drawing plant in Spain, near Bilbao, where he continued for a year as manager.

== Businesses ==
On returning to Germany, he and business partner Clemens Kießelbach founded and managed the Sack & Kiesselbach engineering works in Rath, near Düsseldorf in 1891, which soon developed into a well-known business.

In 1899 he resigned from the management of these works and started the firm Sack, GmbH., also in Rath, devoting all of his energy to its development until the end of his life. Here he found scope for his remarkable talent as an engineer and ample opportunity to realise his inventive skill in the construction of machinery of all kinds, especially rolling-mills.

== Invention of the Sack mill ==
Among other inventions, he perfected the construction of the Sack mill, a steel rolling-mill capable of producing both parallel and tapered wide-flange beams. Sack presented a paper before the Iron and Steel Institute in 1889 detailing his universal mill and its operation.

== Professional institutions ==
Sack was elected a member of the Iron and Steel Institute in 1894, and was a member of the Association of German Engineers (VDI).

== Death ==
Hugo Sack died suddenly on 23 June 1909 at Offdilln, near Düsseldorf.
