= Steinhoff =

Steinhoff is a German surname. Notable people with the surname include:

- Bruno Steinhoff (born 1937), German billionaire businessman, founder of Steinhoff International
- Ernst Steinhoff (1908-1987), German rocket scientist
- Fritz Steinhoff (1897-1969), German politician
- Gerda Steinhoff (1922-1946), Nazi SS concentration camp overseer hanged for war crimes
- Hans Steinhoff (1882-1945), German film director
- Johannes Steinhoff (1913-1994), German Luftwaffe pilot
- John Steinhoff (born 1942), classical physicist
- Karl Steinhoff (1892-1981), Minister-President of Brandenburg
- Kathy Steinhoff, member of the Missouri House of Representatives from the 45th district
