= Lesara =

Former clothing e-commerce site

- Type: Privately held company
- Industry: Fashion
- Founded: 2013
- Founder: Roman Kirsch
- Headquarters: Berlin, Germany
- Number of locations: 24 (Europe) (2017)
- Area served: Europe
- Key people: Roman Kirsch, Founder and CEO; Robin Müller, Co-Founder and CTO; Matthias Wilrich, Co-Founder and COO
- Revenue: €75 million (2016)
- Website: www.lesara.com

Lesara was a clothing e-commerce site founded in Berlin in 2013. On November 9, 2018, the company filed for bankruptcy.

== History ==
Lesara was founded in 2013 by CEO Roman Kirsch, COO Matthias Wilrich, and CTO Robin Müller. The company's head office was located at the Schicklerhaus in Berlin, Germany, and the second office was in Guangzhou, China.

In November 2018, Lesara CEO Roman Kirsch filed for bankruptcy.

== Retail ==
According to "Insights.samsung.com", Lesara was one of the first companies that used the concept of agile retail within the fashion industry. Agile retail is a direct-to-consumer retail model that uses big data to try to predict trends, manage efficient production cycles, and optimize turnaround on emerging styles. The company used data acquired from Google, social media, and blog posts, then analyzed it to identify current trends.

== Criticism ==
In 2015, Lesara GmbH initiated a legal action against Daniel Brückner, but the case was dismissed by the Landgericht Köln (Regional Court, Cologne) in 2016.

In September 2016, Beobachter reported about alleged illegal crossed-out prices in Switzerland, citing Guido Sutter, chief legal adviser of Federal Department of Economic Affairs, Education and Research (SECO) in Switzerland.

In early 2018, Manager magazin reported that Lesara inflated revenue figures by not accounting for returns.
