= Garoto =

Brazilian chocolate manufacturer

Coordinates: 20°20′16″S 40°18′30″W

Chocolates Garoto S.A.

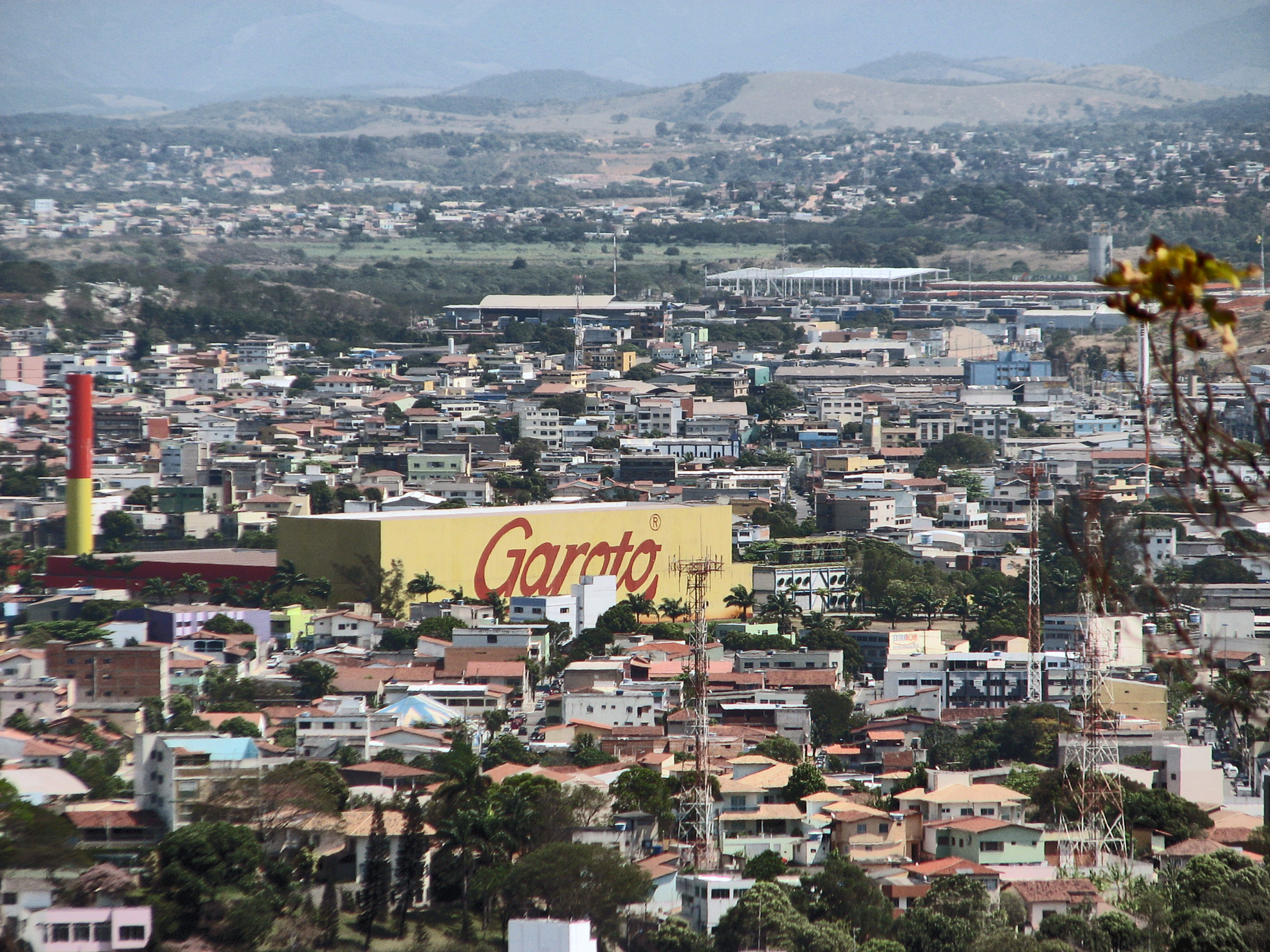
- Garoto's headquarters in Vila Velha, Espírito Santo.
- Type: Private
- Industry: Food processing
- Founded: 1929
- Headquarters: Vila Velha, Espírito Santo, Brazil
- Key people: Heinrich Meyerfreund, Founder; Helmut Meyerfreund, Chairman and CEO
- Products: Confectionery
- Brands: Talento, Baton, Serenata de Amor
- Revenue: BRL $2.5 billion (2016)
- Parent: Nestlé
- Website: www.garoto.com.br

Chocolates Garoto S.A. is a Brazilian chocolate and confectionery company headquartered in Vila Velha, Espírito Santo. The company was founded in 1929 by German immigrant Heinrich Meyerfreund and acquired by Nestlé in 2002.

== History ==
=== Early history and launch of Garoto (1929-2001) ===
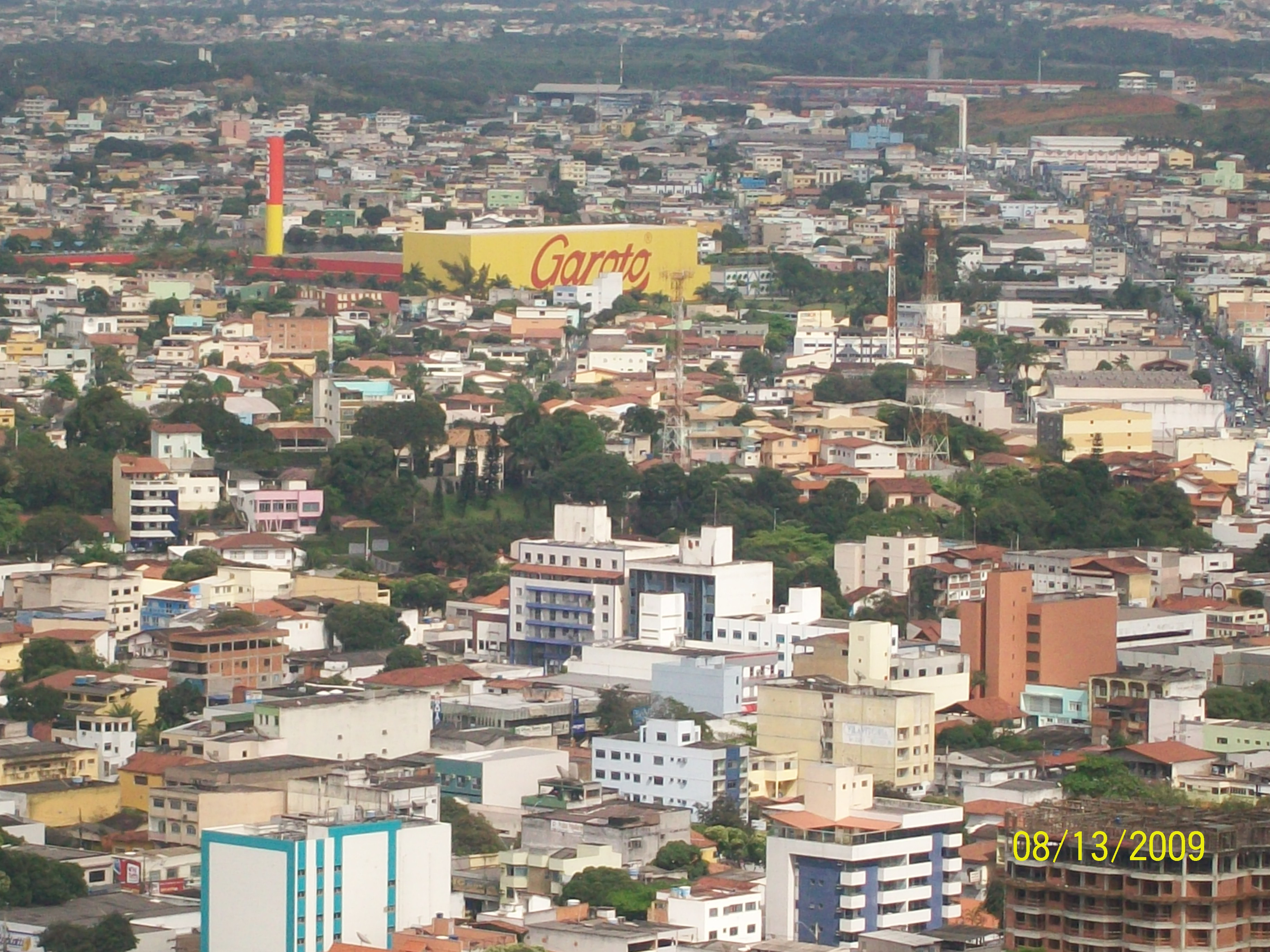
Panoramic view of Brazilian city Vila Velha with the yellow and red Garoto factory.

The company Chocolates Garoto was founded on August 16, 1929, by the German immigrant Heinrich Meyerfreund, with the name of candy factory H. Meyerfreund & Cia., in a warehouse located in Prainha, a neighborhood located in the city of Vila Velha in the Brazilian state Espírito Santo. Garoto started by producing the Pastilha Garoto mint. The first candies were first sold at the local tram stops in Vila Velha and subsequently distributed to commercial clients, both in the capital and in other major cities of the state.

In 1934, Heinrich Meyerfreund received an inheritance from his parents and bought machines for the production of chocolates. Two years later, he obtained financing to set up a more modern factory in the Glória neighborhood, where Garoto's industrial park still stands today. With new infrastructure and chocolate-based products, the company entered a phase of strong growth and began selling beyond the limits of Espírito Santo.

In 1938, business was boosted when Günther Zennig joined the company. He brought in new investments and expanded and modernized the production and commercial structure of the company, bringing with him a new entrepreneurial vision for Garoto.

=== Acquisition and recent history (2002-today) ===
In 2002, Nestlé acquired Garoto for around $240 million. In 2004 however, the sale was vetoed by the Brazilian competition authority (CADE) in order to keep a healthy level of competition in the domestic chocolate market. In the following years, Garoto was therefore owned by Nestlé but operated separately. Nestlé continued to explore options for a full integration and in 2016, after more than 10 years of negotiation, the company announced to be close to signing a deal with CADE for a full merger. The conditions included that the company has to sell several brands to avoid a market concentration above 40%.

== Products ==
A Garoto chocolate

Today, Garoto is one of the largest chocolate manufacturers in Brazil. It exports its chocolate to various countries. Garoto's chocolate candy bars are distributed by a variety of distributors. Walgreens had sold Garoto's candies under the brand name of Regal Dynasty, but has recently switched to a Polish supplier.

== Sponsorships ==
On January 16, 2013, the company signed sponsorship of 200 million reais with FIFA and the CBF to be the official chocolate of the Confederations Cup 2013 and the 2014 World Cup in Brazil.

== See also ==
- List of bean-to-bar chocolate manufacturers
