= Herz (surname) =

Herz is a German surname meaning "heart". Notable people with the surname include:

- A. de Herz (1887–1936), Romanian playwright, literary journalist, poet, short story author and stage actor
- Adam Herz, American writer and producer
- Adolf Herz (1862–1947), Austrian engineer, inventor of Herz spark plug, photographer and first editor of Camera Magazine
- Alfred Otto Herz (1856–1905), German entomologist
- Alice Herz (1882–1965), American pacifist
- Alice Herz-Sommer (1903–2014), née Herz, Czech-born Jewish pianist, oldest Holocaust survivor
- Carl Herz (1831–1897), German lawyer and politician
- Carl S. Herz (1930–1995), American-Canadian mathematician
- Cornelius Herz (1845-1898), French-American businessman and politician involved in the 1892 Panama scandals
- Daniela Herz-Schnoekel (born 1954), née Herz, German businesswoman
- DJ Herz (born 2001), American Major League Baseball pitcher
- Eberhard Herz (fl. 1953–1960), German-born American footballer
- Elise Herz (1788–1868), Austrian philanthropist
- Emil Herz (1877–1971), German publisher
- Günter Herz (born 1940), German businessman
- Henri Herz (1803–1888), Austrian pianist, composer and piano manufacturer
- Henriette Herz (1764–1847), German writer best known for the literary salons that she started
- Herbert Herz (1924–2016), World War II French Resistance member
- Joachim Herz (1924–2010), German opera director and manager
- John H. Herz (1908–2005), American scholar of international relations
- Julia Herz (born 1997), German politician
- Juraj Herz (1934–2018), Slovak film director, writer and actor
- Laura Herz (born 1974), British-German physicist
- Leopold Herz (1953–2026), German politician
- Marce Herz (1911–1964), American educator and professional skier
- Markus Herz (1747–1803), German Jewish physician and philosophy professor
- Martin F. Herz (1917–1983), American diplomat and ambassador
- Max Herz (1856–1919), Hungarian architect, conservator, museum director and architectural historian
- Max Herz (businessman) (1905–1965), German businessman
- Michael Herz (businessman) (born 1943), German businessman
- Michael Herz (producer) (born 1949), American film producer, director and screenwriter
- Nat Herz (1920–1964), American photographer, poet and writer
- Rachel Sarah Herz, Canadian and American psychologist and cognitive neuroscientist
- Shirley Herz (1925–2013), American Broadway theater publicist
- Wilhelm Herz (1912–1998), German motorcycle racer and manager and land speed racer
- Winfried Herz (1929–2022), German footballer
- Wolfgang Herz (born 1950), German businessman

== See also ==
- Hertz (disambiguation)
