= Maxingvest AG =

German holding company

Maxingvest AG is a German holding company, known primarily for owning coffee giant Tschibo and holding a controlling stake at Beiersdorf. The company has been wholly owned by brothers Michael and Wolfgang Herz since 2003, after having bought out siblings Günter and Daniela.

The company originated as Tchibo Holding AG, and was renamed Maxingvest AG in 2007. As of 2023, the company posted €12.6 billion in sales, with €1.1 billion in earnings.

The company is based in Hamburg.
