= Herzig =

Herzig may refer to:

== People with the surname ==
- Aiko Herzig-Yoshinaga (1924-2018), American activist
- Arno Herzig (born 1937), German historian from Wambierzyce, Silesia
- Charles Edwin Herzig, US Roman Catholic bishop
- Christopher Herzig, (1926-1993) British civil servant
- Denny Herzig (born 1984, Pößneck), German footballer with Rot-Weiss Essen
- Edmund Herzig (born 1958), British iranologist
- Édouard Herzig (1860–1926), Swiss painter, drawer and illustrator who lived in French Algeria
- Ernst Herzig (born 1943), Austrian politician, mayor of Breitenfurt bei Wien
- Eva Herzig (born 1972), Austrian actress
- Friedrich Herzig (1915–1954), Sturmbannführer (Major) in the Waffen SS
- Heinrich Herzig (1887–1964), Swiss painter
- Josef Herzig (1853–1924), Jewish Austrian chemist
- Katie Herzig (born 1980), US singer/songwriter
- Mark Herzig, American cinematographer
- Monika Herzig (born 1964), German-American jazz pianist
- Nico Herzig (born 1983), German footballer
- Sig Herzig (1897–1985), American screenwriter and playwright

== See also ==
- Herzig-Meyer alkimide group determination, a chemical test
- Eva Herzigová (born 1973, Litvínov)
- Yitzhak Artzi, born Izo Hertzig
- Herz (disambiguation)
- Hertz (disambiguation)
- Hertzog (disambiguation)
