= Hurts =

Hurts may refer to:

- Pain, injury or suffering
- Hurts (duo), British musical duo
- "Hurts" (song), by Emeli Sandé, 2016
- "Hurts", a song by Lany from LANY, 2017
- "Hurts", a song by Mika from No Place in Heaven, 2016
- "Hurts", a song by Wafia featuring Louis the Child and Whethan, 2019
- "Still Hurts", a song by Therapy? From Disquiet
- Jalen Hurts (born 1998), American football quarterback

== See also ==
- Hertz (disambiguation)
- Herz (disambiguation)
- Hurt (disambiguation)
- Hurtz, a surname
