= Camera (magazine) =

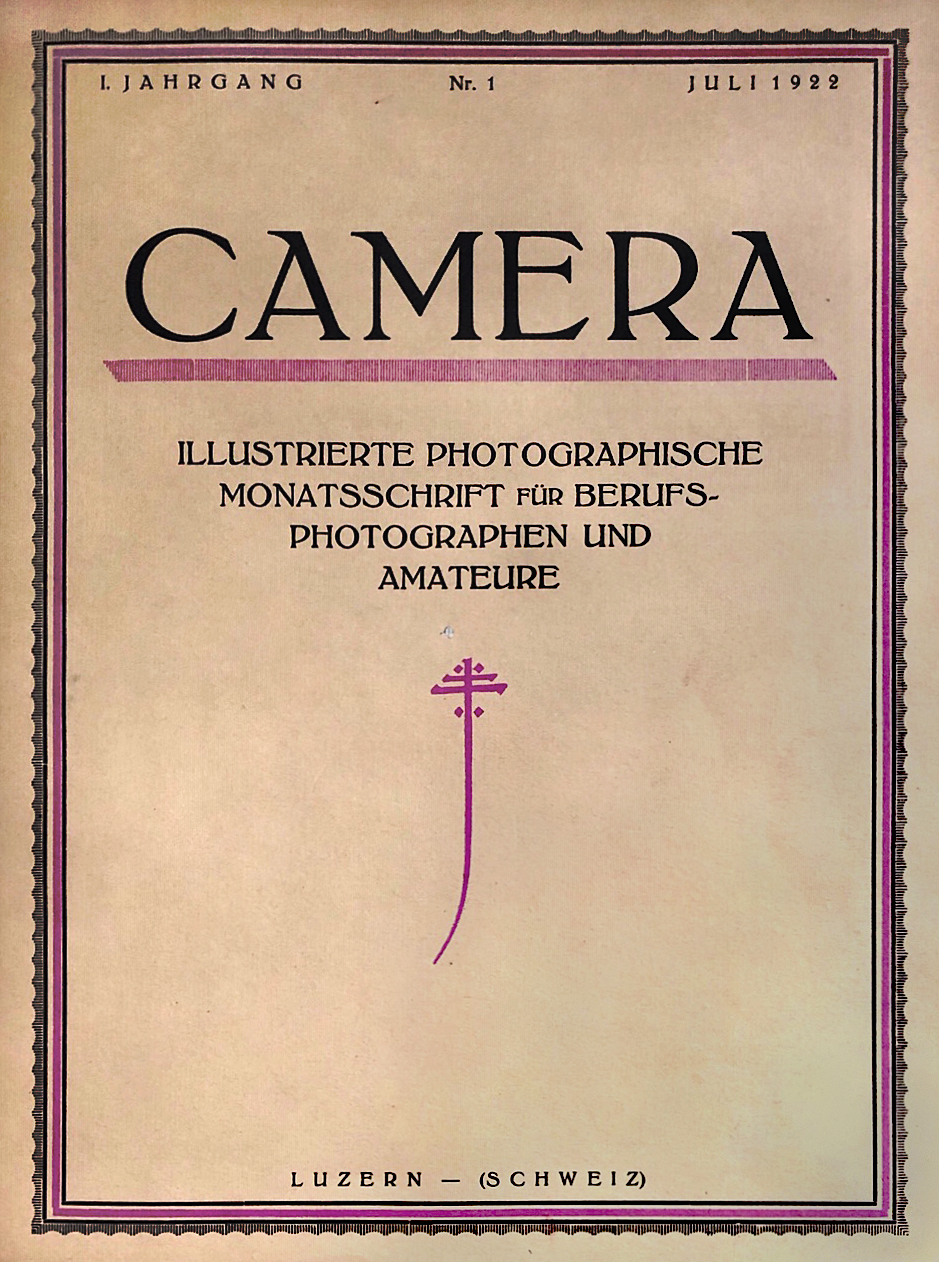
- The first issue of 'Camera' magazine, published in June of 1922.
- Former editors: Adolf Herz, Walter Läubli, Hans Neuberg, Romeo Martinez, Allan Porter
- Categories: Photography
- Publisher: C. J. Bucher (until 1973), Ringier
- Founder: Adolf Herz, C. J. Bucher
- First issue: June 1922
- Final issue: December 1981
- Country: Switzerland
- Based in: Lucerne
- Language: German until 1952, then in English, French
- Website: www.worldcat.org/title/camera/oclc/43570974
- ISSN: 0008-2074
- OCLC: 43570974

Camera is a photography review that began its life in Lucerne, Switzerland, later distributed in many countries and languages. The magazine grew to its greatest international influence towards in latter half of its life of sixty years; on the leading edge of almost every important period in photography, Camera was often among the first publications to show the first works of now well-known photographers such as Edward Steichen, Robert Frank and Jeanloup Sieff.

Adopting the name, design and spirit of the magazine's most successful years, in a venture independent of its former publishers, editor Bruno Bonnabry-Duval and journalist Brigitte Ollier re-launched Camera as a quarterly review: the first edition appeared in kiosks on 17 January 2013.

== The early years: 1922-1947 ==
The first German-language issue of Camera was published by the engineer Adolf Herz and book-publisher C. J. Bucher in June 1922. Making clear its aim to aid the development of the still-fledgling art photography movement, this issue began with the following statement of intent:

With this issue we introduce ourselves to the public for the first time. We would like to say a few words about our aims. Our magazine will support artistic photography. We thought it expedient to show our readers an artist's work through ample selections of good-quality reproductions. Artists from all countries will be sharing their pictures. Hereon in every issue we will present eight pages of good reproductions. Participating artists will present their art styles in original essays. Articles on technical photographic subjects, written by authors the best in this field, will appear in the technical section. In brief reports we will comment on all new developments so that our readers can obtain an up-to-date view of photography. We invite all photographers and researchers of all countries who would like to bring technical information to our readers, to submit their articles. We will periodically conduct contests to encourage developing artists, and the best entries will receive a monetary award. We hope our efforts will be conducive to the high aims of artistic photography and that our readers will support us.

Adolf Herz first made the magazine's 'high-quality prints' with a dull-finish semi-matte paper that gave a result only mimicking the still-new sheet-fed gravure system, but eventually moved to the latter technique when the Bücher publishing company adopted the technology from 1925.

The publishing half of the partnership had changed after C. J. Bucher's stroke in 1941: from then his wife, Alice, unofficially took over the direction of the publishing company, and she would become the official director upon her husband's death in 1950.

Herz's period as editor of Camera, ending in 1947, was marked for its focus on Pictorialism. Contributing photographers from this period and style were Heinrich Kühn, Léonard Missone, Hoffmeister, Craig Annan, Edward Steichen, Kieghley and Demachy.

== 1947-1965 ==
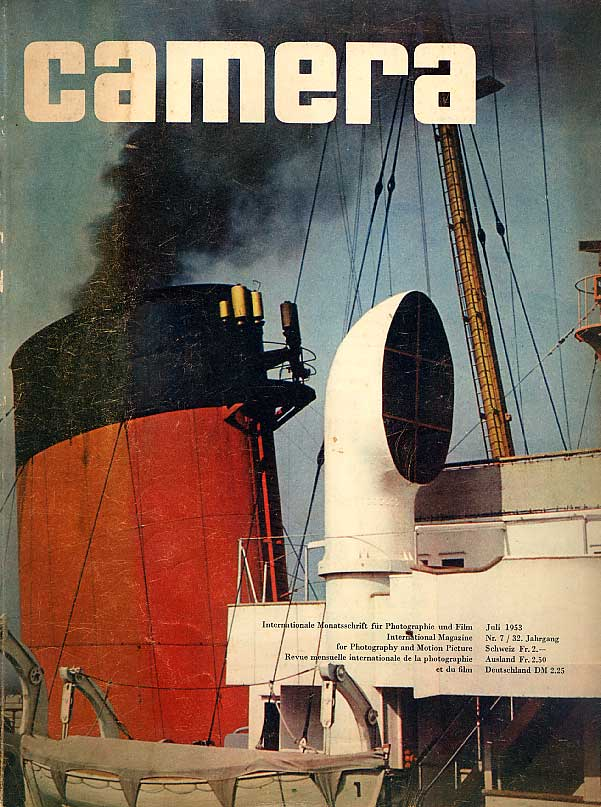
July 1953 edition, soon after the creation of a new 'Camera' logo by Walter Läubli.

The post-war period was an important one for Camera, with the publication of the earliest works of photographers Jakob Tuggener, Gotthard Schuh, Henri Cartier-Bresson, Robert Capa (and Magnum), Bill Brandt and Robert Frank.

Walter Läubli became chief editor, or 'art director' as the position was called then, from January 1948. The 1949 special issue featured Robert Frank's first published photography, and was Camera's first important mark on international photo-journalism. To better expand the Camera readership, Läubli introduced articles translated into English and French from their native German, making the magazine a trilingual one. He also re-looked the magazine and graced it with a new logo that would remain practically unchanged until the magazine's 1981 demise.

The graphic designer Hans Neuburg succeeded Läubli from 1952, and led the editorial board until 1954. He was unofficially succeeded for two years by Imre Reiner, then Romeo Martinez appeared as the next editor in chief from July 1956.

From the March 1957 issue onward, Martinez transformed Camera from a trilingual magazine into three separate English, French and German editions, and returned the magazine to a purely photographic one. As Martinez was not a photographer but a journalist with an acute knowledge of art and the history of photography, the magazine under his direction was able to reach an unforeseen larger readership.

Camera from 1960 entered an association with Europhot, an organisation of European Professional Photographers, from when four issues a year, labelled "Camera EUROPHOT", under the direction of a special Europhot panel, would treat subjects of concern to the professional photographers of their usual audience. Romeo Martinez left the magazine without a replacing editor after the May 1964 edition, but the magazine continued under Bucher and the remaining Camera staff.

== The Porter years ==
Cover of the November 1973 issue

Allan Porter first appeared from December 1965 as a guest editor, but became the editor in chief from January the following year. Mrs. Bucher's choice of Mr. Porter, an American citizen with few connections to Europe, was a hard sell, but it was thought that his talent for design and 'foreign touch' could be a great aid to a magazine then in difficulty. Under the direction of Allan Porter, Camera was marked not only by its search for talent in the leading frontiers of modern photography, but for its examination, from a modern viewpoint, of the works of past masters.

Camera's 1965 circulation was at 9,300 copies, all languages combined. Porter had promised an 8% circulation increase over a period of nine months, but through an active effort to increase subscriptions (namely through long-term contracts with libraries and other institutions), an increased American circulation through an agreement with New York City-based Acme Publications, and a new approach to the magazine's advertising department and ad sales, circulation had risen by 20% by the end of the year. Allan celebrated his 100th issue with the April 1974, Vol 53, No. 4 edition showing his favorite genre, landscapes. It featured the works of Don Eddy on the cover and inside. Other photographers in the issue were Vincent Vallarino; Charles H. Caffin; Klaus Ott; T.C. Tilney; David Bayles; Carl Georg Heise; Léonard Misonne; George A. Tice; Sadakichi Hartmann.

C. J. Bucher AG was taken over by the Ringier printing company in 1973. The new owners saw no interest in Camera, yet instead of ending the publication altogether, Ringier thought that by withdrawing all but a minimum promotional support, readership interest would dwindle and the magazine would find a natural end on its own. One of the first limitations Ringier would impose was a switch to the faster and cheaper lithographic offset printing system rather than the slower and more expensive sheet-fed gravure technology used until then. Porter, having reservations about how Camera's readership would react to the drop in printing quality, with the help of technicians from the still-functioning gravure department, managed to develop a two-colour duplex offset system that would at the same time cut costs and maintain quality.

After eight more years of production Ringier decided that Camera was not in the company interests, and marked December 1981, a date a few months short of the magazine's 60th anniversary, as the month of its final issue.

== Camera as a reference ==
Camera was a longtime reference for all things photographic, and was among the first to publish many works from today's great masters. Some of the world's biggest libraries, such as the National Library of France in Paris carry hard-bound editions of Camera as reference works.

== See also ==
- List of magazines in Switzerland

== Bibliography ==
Book

- Porter, Allan (1982). Camera, Die 50er Jahre (in German). C.J. Bucher. ISBN 3-7658-0399-5.

Web

- "Designonsense" - Allan Porter, "Camera, the History". Retrieved 13 August 2006.
