= Heartz =

Heartz is a surname. Notable people with the surname include:

- Daniel Heartz (1928–2019), American musicologist
- Frank Richard Heartz (1871–1955), Canadian politician

== See also ==
- Heart (surname)
- Hertz (surname)
- Herz (surname)
- Hurtz (surname)
