= Ingeburg Herz =

German entrepreneur and philanthropist (1920-2015)

- Born: February 23, 1920; Hamburg
- Died: September 30, 2015 (aged 95); Hamburg
- Occupations: Entrepreneur and Philanthropist

Ingeburg Herz, née König (born February 23, 1920 Hamburg; - September 30, 2015) was a German entrepreneur and philanthropist. The wife of Tchibo founder Max Herz was one of the richest Germans with an estimated fortune of over five billion euros in 2005.

== Life ==
Ingeburg König, who lived in Hamburg, married Max Herz in 1939; they had five children together: Günter Herz (* 1940), Joachim Herz (1941–2008), Michael Herz (* 1943), Wolfgang Herz and Daniela Herz-Schnoeckel.

After the death of the company founder in 1965, the entire estate passed to his wife and children, but the will did not clearly regulate the company's succession. A dispute arose between the children. Günter Herz, as the eldest, took over the management of the Tchibo company, while the mother and the other children held further shares.

Ingeburg Herz turned to charitable work and established the Max and Ingeburg Herz Foundation, which primarily supports facilities for the medical treatment and care of the elderly, but is also active in other areas, such as awarding scholarships to German students.

At the beginning of 2001, Günter Herz had to resign as chairman of the management board of the then Tchibo Holding AG (now maxingvest ag) due to ongoing disputes within the family. For months, the dispute also paralyzed the company and the intended acquisition of a majority stake in the cosmetics group Beiersdorf AG. In August 2003, the family members signed a contract that made mother Ingeburg Herz and the three brothers Michael, Wolfgang and Joachim the sole owners of the family group. Former boss Günter Herz and his sister Daniela were paid out an estimated four billion euros.

Ingeburg Herz died in Hamburg on September 30, 2015, at the age of 95.

The asteroid (185164) Ingeburgherz was named in her honor.
