= Hertz (name) =

Hertz is an Anglicized name of German origin, with 'herz' literally meaning 'heart' in English. This alternate spelling of 'Herz' with an additional 't' primarily arose during the 19th and 20th centuries as German-speaking immigrants travelled to English-dominant regions like North America. 'Hertz' was easier to pronounce in English, and approximated the proper German pronunciation of the word. It is primarily a surname but it has also been used as a given name. Notable people with the name include:

== Surname ==
- Alfred Hertz (1872–1942), German musician
- Arne Hertz (born 1939), Swedish racer
- Carl Hertz (1859–1924), American performer
- Carl Hellmuth Hertz (aka Carl Helmut Hertz) (1920–1990), German-born medical researcher
- Carmen Hertz (born 1945), Chilean lawyer and politician
- Fanny Hertz (1830–1908), German-born British educationalist and feminist
- Garnet Hertz (born 1973), Canadian artist, designer and academic
- Gustav Ludwig Hertz (1887–1975), German physicist
- Heinrich Hertz (1857–1894), German physicist and namesake of the SI-derived unit of frequency, the hertz
- Henrik Hertz (1797–1870), Danish writer
- Henry L. Hertz (1847–1926), American politician
- John Hertz (disambiguation), multiple people, including:
  - John D. Hertz (1879–1961), American businessman
  - John H. Herz (1908–2005), American political scientist
  - John Hertz (fan), American attorney and science fiction fan
- Joseph Hertz (1872–1946), Hungary-born religious leader and Chief Rabbi of the United Kingdom
- Judah Hertz, American real estate investor
- Noreena Hertz (born 1967), British economist
- Peter Hertz (1874–1939), Danish art historian and museum worker
- Robert Hertz (1881–1915), French sociologist
- Rosanna Hertz, American sociologist
- Saul Hertz (1905–1950), American physician
- Steve Hertz (disambiguation), multiple people, including:
  - Steve Hertz (baseball coach) (born 1950), former head baseball coach of the UC Irvine Anteaters and Gonzaga Bulldogs
  - Steve Hertz (third baseman), American baseball player and coach
- Wilhelm Hertz (1835–1902), German writer
- Yaëla Hertz (1930–2014), Israeli-Canadian teacher

== Given name ==
- Hertz Grosbard (1892−1994), reciter of Yiddish literature

== See also ==
- Heartz (surname)
- Herz (surname)
- Hurtz (surname)
- Hersh
- Herzl
