= Hurtt =

Hurtt is a surname. Notable people with the surname include:

- Clint Hurtt (born 1978), American football coach
- Justin Hurtt (born 1988), American basketball player
- Harold Hurtt, American police chief
- Phil Hurtt, American musician
- Rob Hurtt (born 1944), American politician

== See also ==
- Hurt (disambiguation)
