= Heart (surname) =

Heart is a surname. Notable people with the surname include:

- Frank Heart (1929–2018), American computer engineer and Internet pioneer
- Monique Heart, American drag queen
- Zack Heart, Australian television and film personality

== See also ==
- Hart (surname); some persons with this surname may be erroneously referred to as "Heart"
- Heart (disambiguation)
- Heartz
- Heart Evangelista (born 1985), Filipina actress and singer
