= Allan Porter =

Swiss photographer (1934–2022)

Allan Porter (April 29, 1934 – October 5, 2022) was an American Swiss photographer, journalist, editor, designer, and art director best known for his role as editor of Camera. His eye for talent helped launch the career of many now-renowned photographers, namely Josef Koudelka, Stephen Shore, and Sarah Moon amongst many others.

== Early life and education ==
'Holiday' magazine cover April 1953. Photo: Robert Capa

Allan Porter was the elder of three brothers born to parents of Russian-Jewish ancestry living in Philadelphia. After attending Stokely Elementary School then Blaine Junior High School, Porter's father wanted him to prepare for a business education, but one of his earliest hobbies, collecting 19th-century circus posters, already showed a propensity for art and graphic design.

After graduating from Central High school in 1952, Allan Porter enrolled as a scholarship student in the Philadelphia Museum College of Art, and studied graphic design, painting, photography and art history under teachers such as Franz Kline. One of his study projects was to compose a cover for "Holiday" magazine (a magazine that he would later work for): the work was rejected by his teacher, but an amazingly similar cover appeared on the newsstands one month later. During his education, he found employment in a darkroom, and through the same lab had his first exposure to lithography techniques. One of his 1953 photography experiments resulted a definite fascination with that medium as well, a time from which he participated in several expositions, winning first prize at the Philadelphia Exhibition of Industrial Photography in 1954.

His studies were interrupted by army service from 1955 in German Aschaffenburg and Stuttgart; when his military service ended, he completed his last half year of studies and graduated from the Philidalphia Museum with a Bachelor of Fine Arts degree. He would return to Offenbach to attend the typography courses of Hans Schmidt: inspired by his teacher's work with tapestry-workshop owners Gret Mohrhardt und Inge Richter, Allan weaved a first "Tower of Babel" tapestry in 1857, which would be shown at an exhibition for of former Philadelphia Museum School students one year later.

== Early career ==
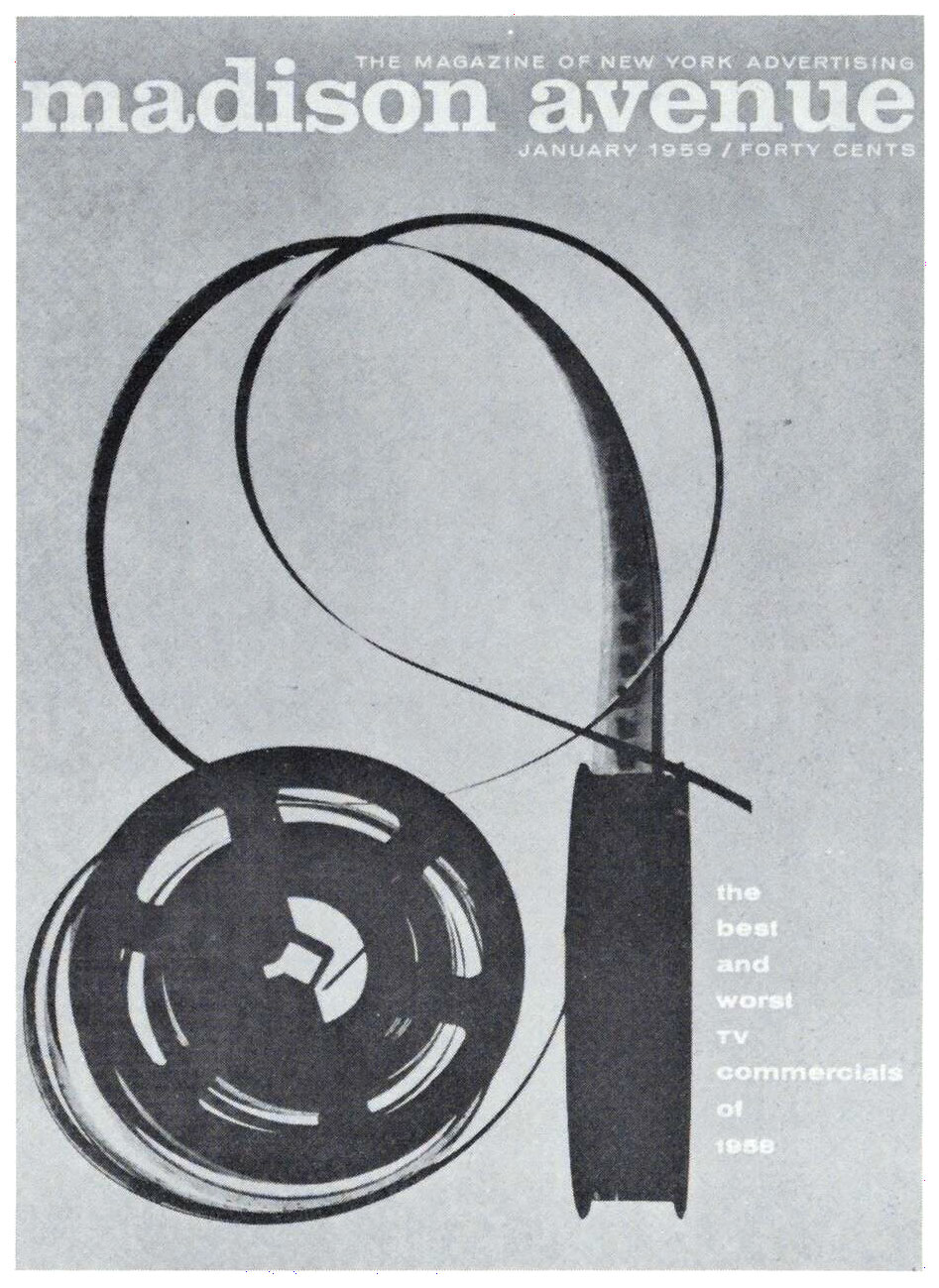
Art Directors' Club award-winning Madison Avenue magazine cover Photo: Allan Porter

After unsuccessfully trying to find work in New York, Allan Porter returned to Phillidalphia to work at "Holiday" magazine between 1957 and 1959, and edited the August edition of the latter year practically on his own: this was his first experience as editor, and enacting his idea to present landscapes with no people for that issue led to his encounter with photographers Brett Weston and Ansel Adams, and Jack Kerouac and Truman Capote, writers for the magazine then.

All while serving as art director for Seventeen magazine from 1959, Porter took trips to Offenbach to complete two more tapestries, "City of Non Dwellers" and "Four Seraphim Guarding the Cross", and would return yet again to complete "Kedosheem Tehehyoo" one year later. But, still in 1959, Allan presented his works for the first time in a group exhibition at the Dallas Museum of Fine Arts, was included in an American Federation of Arts-sponsored group tour, and again in a solo exhibition, accompanied by his etching and lithography work, at America's location at 106 West 56th Street, New York City, America House. He also worked for Madison Avenue, an alternative magazine, that year, and would win the Art Direction and Photo prize from the Art Directors Club the year after.

At the same time as the above, creative agent Emilio d'Antonio (representing Andy Warhol, John Cage and Robert Frank, amongst others) presented Allan to architect George Nelson, and through him began work on pavilions, displays and presentations for the 1959 American National Exhibition: with Charles and Ray Eames he designed presentations and media supports for Buckminster Fuller's 'Dome' project, and the same again for their "Glimpses of America" projections of 2,200 images onto seven large screens. Lastly, under the direction of Edward Steichen and the Museum of Modern Art, he designed the supports for the "Family of Man" exhibit. After a six-month convalescence period because of a motorcycle accident, and still working with Nelson, he worked extensively on the design and presentation of the synergetics "City of Tomorrow" pavilion for the 1962 Seattle "Century 21 Exhibition".

Porter finally moves from Philadelphia to New York City in 1963 and became involved in the beat generation scene and artists such as Allen Ginsberg, Jack Kerouac, Robert Frank, Leroi Jones, Edward Dahlberg. After Kennedy's assassination that year, and friend-photographer Horst H. Baumann's proposition to do the layout for his upcoming book, "The New Matadors", brought him to Lucerne, Switzerland and the Bucher editing company, the publishers of Camera.

== Editor of Camera ==
Camera, begun by engineer Adolf Herz and book-publisher C. J. Bucher in June 1922, was an endeavour to take photography beyond its then-utilitarian limitations and build appreciation for it as an art-form. Bucher's wife, Alice, who took over the publisher role after her husband's stroke in 1941, tried a series of editors after Herz had stopped editing the magazine from 1947, but when the magazine found itself in difficulty in the mid-1960s, she thought that Porter's insightfulness and 'foreign touch' would bring a fresh start to the magazine. First appearing in December 1965 as guest editor, Allan Porter became editor in chief of Camera from the following year. In addition to re-looking the publication, Porter began a campaign to increase readership through subscriptions, namely those of libraries and other international institutions, and negotiated an increased US circulation. From its 1965 circulation of 9,300, Porter had promised an 8% increase in readership, but it had already increased by 20% at the end of his first year.

Porter helped launch the career of other photographers, namely Josef Koudelka (1974), Stephen Shore, and Sarah Moon. Porter's Camera was also the first to showcase the experimental work of other photographers, such as Richard Avedon's 'Jacob Israel Avedon' series on his dying father that appeared in November 1974.

After a successful run of 16 years, the last issue of Camera appeared on 1 December 1981.

== Exhibitions ==
Solo

- 1955, Philadelphia, Gilded Cage Gallery, Allan Porter. Paintings & Photographs.
- 1984, Zurich, Nikon Gallery, Allan Porter and friends in photography.

Group

- 1954, Philadelphia, American Museum of Photography, Industrial Photography.
- 1970, Lausanne, Galerie Impact, Creative Photography.
- 1994, Liestal, Kunsthalle Palazzo, John Miller – Christina Frey. Photographs from the collection Allan Porter.
- 1997, Kriens, Museum in the Bell Park, Private View. Collection Allan Porter (with Lisette Model).
- 2013, Lucerne, Fotokammer, Transatlantik link.

== Awards ==
- 1954, American Museum of Photography, Philadelphia, First Prize at Exhibition of Industrial Photography.
- 1970, German Academy of Photography, David Octavius Hill Medal.
- 1979, German Society for Photography (DGPh), Culture Prize.

== Publications ==
=== Author, written word ===
- The Neophytes, a Novel (1955)
- Sagittarius and the Mermaid (1969).
- There was a Land of Day with Zebras with White Stripes and Black Bodies, children's book (1975)
- A Child's Garden of Photography (1979).
- "Photomania", a short story (1981)
- Remembrance of things present (How I see them as I saw them) (1984).

=== Author, editing, art direction ===
(publisher: Photothema, Bär Verlag)

- Wie ich sie sehe, wie ich sie sah (1984 – with Dieter W Portmann).
- Josef Sudek, 1896–1976 (1985).
- Alfred Stieglitz. Camera Work (1985).
- Schreiben mit Licht (1985).
- Soviet photography, 1919–1939 (1986).
- Luc Chessex. El Público (1988).
- Flor Garduño. Bestiarium (1987).
- Jay Maisel. Photostroika (1989).
- Jiří Jíru. Photostroika (1989).
- Pepi Merisio. Gli Italiani (1989).
- The North American Indian by Edward S. Curtis, printed directly from original photogravures, 1903–1925 (1973).
- Weegee, 1899–1968 (1991).
- Hanspeter Schneider. Unplugged (1993).
- A Photographic Collection by a Photographic Critic
- A Concise History of Chinese Photography
- Out of Fashion (1994)

=== Portfolios ===
- Twelve Instant Images on Polaroid Type-105 Positive-Negative Film (1974).
- Polaroid SX70, 12 Instant Images 1973
- Polaroid Instant Images 1974

=== Exhibition catalogues ===
Introduction, editing, design

- Alexey Brodovitch (1982 – Paris Grand Palais Exposition Catalogue with Georges Tourdjmann).

Introduction

- Barnaby Bossart,1989
- Tomiyasu Shiraiwa,1987
- David Scopic, 1990

Editing, design

- Alexey Brodovitch (1978)
- International Photography in Venice (1978)
- Photokina (1984)

=== Exhibitions: creative direction and design ===
- Holiday meets Belgium, Philadelphia 1958
- American National Exhibition in Moscow,1959
- Century 21, Theme Exhibition, Seattle, Washington 1962
- Color Photography, Arles France 1978
- First World Congress of Craftsmen,1960
- Museum of Contemporary Crafts. 1961
- Photokina The Printed Photograph, 1984
- Camera 1922–1982 Sixty years, Kunsthaus Zürich,1991

=== Poster design ===
- William Carlos Williams Philadelphia 1953
- T. S. Eliot, Philadelphia 1954
- E. E. Cummings 1954 (poetry readings)
- First World Congress of Craftsmen, New York 1961
- LNN, Lucerne 1968
- Beatrix bathing fashion, Italia Photographer Oliviero Toscani 1972
- Loveable, underwear, Italia Photographer Oliviero Toscani 1973
- Photokina, Cologne 1984
- Camera 60 Years, Zürich Photographer Marjolaine Dutoit

=== Monographs: editing and design ===
- Living Masters of Photography (Part 3) (1973).
- Art Kane (1973).
- Sarah Moon (1976).
- Museum without Walls (1978 – special MoMA-expo edition of Camera, introduction).
- Michael Mitchell "Nightlife" (1978 – exposition catalogue, introduction).
- Josef Koudelka, a monograph (1979).
- People in Camera (1979 – design, afterword)
- Christer Strömholm (1981)
- Los Angeles Documentary Project (1981).
- Foundation for Photography Switzerland : 10 years (1981 – special edition of Camera).
- André Gelpke "Sex-Theatre" (1981 – introduction)
- Mexico: An Exhibition of Photographs (1990).

=== Other works ===
- Photography, 1839–1972; Camera, 1922–1972 (1972)
- Photographis '71: International Advertising Photography (1972).
- Photography, an Iconographic, Chronological History (1972).
- A Concise Chronology of Instant Photography 1947–1974 (1975).
- Open photography: An Exhibition of Work Selected by Allan Porter and Keith Arnatt (1976 – with Keith Arnatt and the Midland Group (Nottingham, England)).
- Autoportrait (1978)
- Exploration of a Medium (1978 – Polaroid, Amsterdam publication with other authors).
- Camera: die 50er Jahre (1982).
- Polaroid. Eine Episode (2002 – with Marco Meier).
