= Correlli =

Australian television series

- Starring: Deborra-Lee Furness; Hugh Jackman; Neil Melville
- Country of origin: Australia
- No. of episodes: 10

Production
- Running time: 50 minutes

Original release
- Network: ABC TV
- Release: 26 July – 27 September 1995

Correlli is an Australian television series first broadcast by ABC TV in 1995. It starred Deborra-Lee Furness as prison psychologist Louisa Correlli.

The series also featured her future husband Hugh Jackman in one of his earliest roles. The first episode entitled "Rat Tamer" has been released on to DVD. The creators and Associate Producers of the show were actress Denise Roberts from the ABC's G.P., and Carol Long. Roberts also played the role of prison warden Helen Buckley in episodes four and five.

== Cast ==
- Deborra-Lee Furness as Louisa Correlli
- Hugh Jackman as Kevin Jones
- Neil Melville as Governor Jim Sanderson
- Denise Roberts as Helen Buckley
- Cecily Polson as Jean
- Pepe Trevor as Karen Hodges
- Anthony Hayes as Gazza
- Sue Jones as Sister Pat Riley
- Ray Barrett as Harry Powell
- Maggie Dence as Maureen Barnes
- John Brumpton as Officer Gilbert
- Gerald Lepkowski as Officer Tyler
- John Atkinson as Officer Reid
- Zack Heart as Morris Moore
- David Ngoombujarra as Warren 'Budgie' Keating
- Roger Oakley as Jack Glennen
- Ruby Hunter
- Grant Piro as Toby Miller
- David Argue as Stephen Haines
- Nicholas Bell as Holland
- Elena Mandalis as Kim
- Tom E. Lewis as Fred
- Syd Brisbane as Steve
- Tony Rickards as Officer McAlpine

== Episodes ==
No.	Title	Directed by	Written by	Original release date	Aus. viewers (millions)
1	"Rat Tamer"	Kate Woods	Unknown	26 July 1995	N/A
2	"Roman Holiday"	Tony Tilse	Chris McCourt	2 August 1995	N/A
3	"Shots In the Dark"	Mandy Smith	Unknown	9 August 1995	145,100
4	"Solitary"	Robert Klenner	Kristen Dunphy	16 August 1995	N/A
5	"Lock-Down"	Julian McSwiney	Unknown	23 August 1995	N/A
6	"Spoons"	Kate Woods	Unknown	30 August 1995	N/A
7	"Wishin' 'n' Hopin'"	Mandy Smith	Chris McCourt	6 September 1995	N/A
8	"An Early Release"	Robert Klenner and Ali Ali	Unknown	13 September 1995	N/A
9	"Revelations"	Tony Tilse	Annie Beach, Arianna Bosi and Martin McKenna	20 September 1995	N/A
10	"Rumours"	Kate Woods	Peter Kinloch	27 September 1995	N/A
