= Herz =

Herz is the German word for heart. It may refer to:

== People ==
- Herz (surname)
- Herz Bergner (1907–1970), Polish-born Australian novelist
- Herz Cerfbeer of Medelsheim (1730–1793), Alsatian Jewish philanthropist and army contractor
- Herz., author abbreviation of German botanist T. K. G. Herzog (1880–1961)

== Music ==
- Das Herz, a 1930 German-language opera
- Herz (album), an album by Rosenstolz
- Salle des Concerts Herz, a former concert hall in Paris

== Other uses ==
- Herz Glacier, South Georgia Island, Antarctica
- Herz (lesbian bar), Mobile, Alabama, United States

== See also ==
- Herz-9, an Iranian air defense system
- Hurz, Iran, a village
- Hertz (disambiguation)
