= Günter Herz =

German businessman (born 1940)

- Born: 1940 (age 85–86)
- Known for: Former CEO, Tchibo
- Spouse: married
- Children: 2
- Parent(s): Max Herz; Ingeburg Herz
- Relatives: Michael Herz (brother); Wolfgang Herz (brother); Daniela Herz-Schnoekel (sister); Joachim Herz (brother, deceased)

Günter Herz (born 1940) is a German businessman, former CEO of the German coffee shop and retail chain Tchibo.

== Early life ==
Günter Herz is the son of Max Herz and Ingeburg Herz. Max Herz co-founded Tchibo in 1949 with Carl Tchilinghiryan.

== Career ==
Tchibo is 100% owned by three members of the Herz family, Ingeburg Herz (Max Herz's widow), and two of her sons, Michael and Wolfgang Herz. In 2003, they bought out their brother, Günter, and sister, Daniela Herz-Schnoekel's 40% stake. In 2008, their brother Joachim died in a motorboat accident.

According to Forbes, Herz has a net worth of $2.8 billion, as of May 2015.

== Personal life ==
Herz is married with two children, and lives in Hamburg.
