= Tele-Fever =

Second-generation home video game console

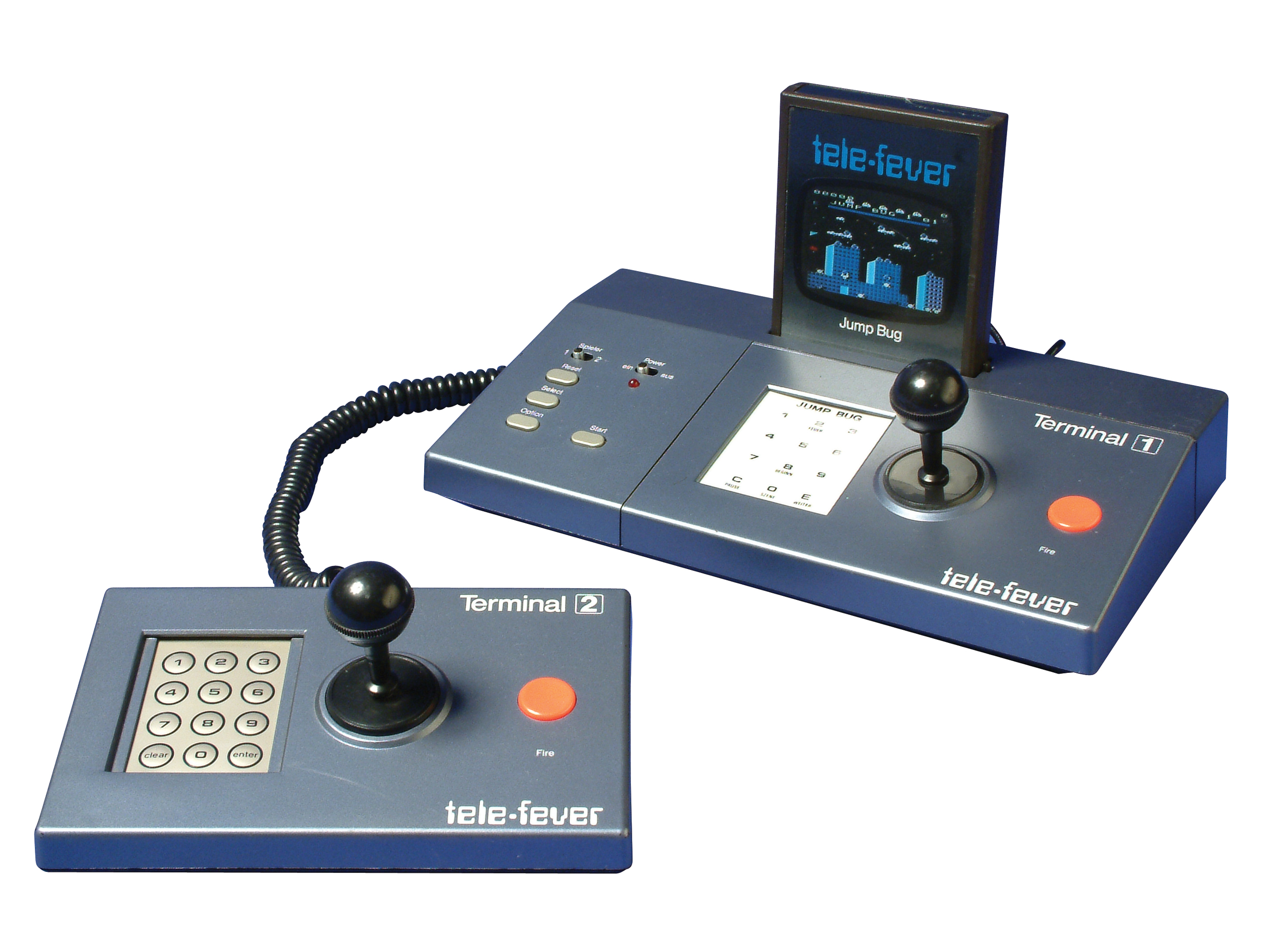
- A Tele-Fever with cartridge inserted
- Developer: Tchibo
- Manufacturer: Tchibo
- Product family: Arcadia 2001
- Type: Home video game console
- Generation: Second generation
- Released: Germany: 1986
- Availability: 1986-?
- Introductory price: 99 Deutsche Mark (DM)
- Media: ROM cartridges
- Graphics: 9 colors
- Sound: 1 channel
- Controller input: 1 hardwired joystick-based game controller, 1 is built in the console
- Power: 15 V DC, 600 mA
- Successor: Retro-Mini-Spielekonsole

The Tele-Fever (stylized as tele-fever) is a second-generation home video game console which was released and marketed by German coffee roaster chain Tchibo in 1986 only in Germany for a list price of 99 Deutsche Mark (DM). It is one of the last variants of the Arcadia 2001 home video game console by Emerson Radio and therefore compatible with all software from it.

The Tele-Fever was only manufactured in very small quantities and is rarely offered today. Only a few games were released for the system. After a short time, the production was discontinued.

== Technical specifications ==
- Platform family: 8 bit
- CPU: Signetics 2650 clocked at 3.58 MHz
- RAM: 1 kB
- ROM: None
- Colors: 9 different colors; 4 for characters, 4 for sprites, and 1 for the background
- Sound: 1 channel
- Input devices: 1 hardwired joystick-based game controller, one is built in the console/12 buttons each
- Power: 15 V DC, 600 mA

== Reception ==
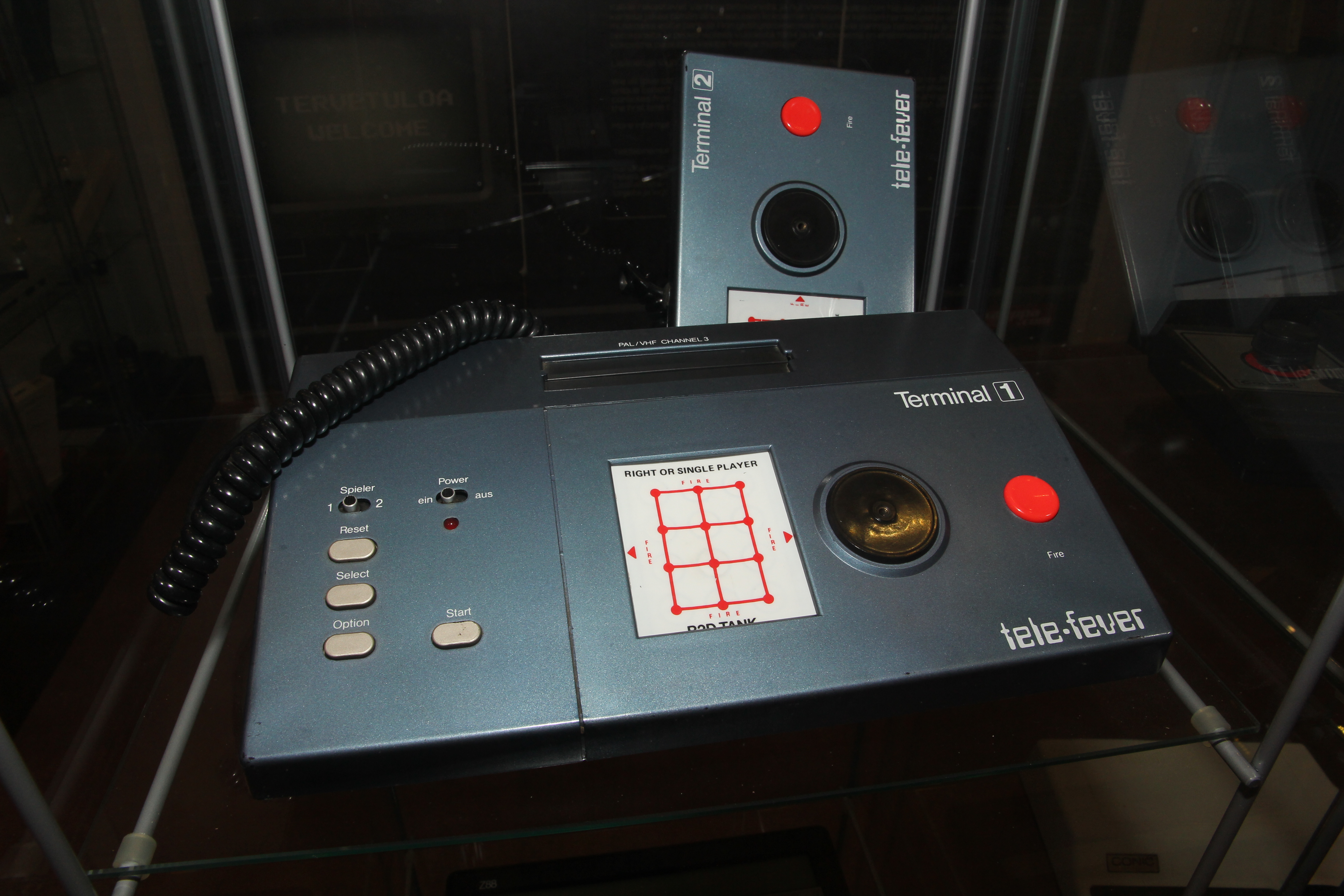
A Tchibo Tele-Fever in the Helsinki Computer and game console museum

The Tele-Fever was a weak console compared to other available consoles around its release time, but very cheap which made it attractive. The console was mostly sold as a budget item in Tchibo sections of discounters.

Some people think the design of the Tele-Fever is quite appealing.

== Legacy ==
In 2019, Tchibo released another console, the Retro-Mini-Spielekonsole, which is a 8-bit dedicated handheld game console that contains 153 pre-installed retro games and costs €14.99. It is basically a clone of Thumbs Up's Retro Arcade Games, Monsterzeug's Retro Arcade, Radbag's Retro Mini-Spielekonsole, ORB's spielesammlung Retro Pocket junior, and Karsten International's Arcade Game Portable Console, which was also released under the name Retro Pocket Spiele/Retro Pocket Games in Germany in a cooperation with Woolworth.

== Literature ==
- Winnie Forster: Spielkonsolen und Heimcomputer, 2015
