= Hurz =

Hurz هورز
- Village
- Location within Iran
- Coordinates: 28°22′15″N 52°32′48″E
- Country: Iran
- Province: Fars
- County: Qir and Karzin
- Bakhsh: Central
- Rural District: Hangam

Population (2006)
  - Total: 726
- Time zone: UTC+3:30 (IRST)
  - Summer (DST): UTC+4:30 (IRDT)

Hurz (Persian: هورز, also Romanized as Hūrz) is a village in Hangam Rural District, in the Central District of Qir and Karzin County, Fars province, Iran. At the 2006 census, its population was 726, in 133 families.
