= Emil Herz =

German publisher (1877-1971)

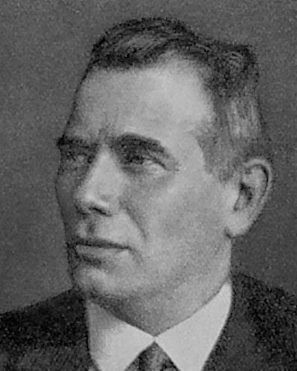
Emil Herz, ca. 1922 (unbekannter Fotograf, Urheberrechte beachten)

Emil Emanuel Herz (April 5, 1877, Essen, Germany – July 7, 1971, Rochester, New York, USA) was a German publisher.

== Life ==
Emil Herz was the son of the hide and fur trader Aron Herz and Amalie Grünewald. The family moved to Warburg in Westphalia around 1880. There he attended the municipal grammar school and graduated from high school.

He studied German literature in Bonn, completing his studies with a dissertation on drama in Shakespeare's time in 1901. After a two-year publishing apprenticeship in Hamburg, he was hired by Ullstein Verlag in Berlin in 1903 as the first director of the newly founded Ullstein Buchverlag. On June 14, 1910, he married Gabriele Berl, a teacher, and they had two daughters (Elisabeth and Gertrud) and two sons (Arthur and Erwin).

Herz introduced the Ullstein paperbacks and founded Propyläen Verlag. His greatest success as a publisher was the 1929 bestseller Im Westen nichts Neues (All Quiet on the Western Front).

== Art Collection ==
Herz was an art collector, acquiring works by Lovis Corinth, Max Liebermann, Max Pechstein, Lesser Ury, Peter Bruegel, Edgar Degas, Hokusai, Oskar Kokoschka, Marie Laurencin, Camille Jacob Pissarro, Auguste Renoir, Max Slevogt, Maurice Utrillo and many other artists.

== Nazi persecution and emigration ==
When Hitler came to power in Germany in 1933, Herz and his employers were persecuted by the Nazis because of their Jewish heritage under anti-semitic racial laws. After more than 30 years at Ullstein, ultimately as director, the Nazis forced his dismissal in 1934. Due to the ever-increasing pressure he was under as a Jew, he decided to emigrate at the end of 1935. He first fled to Palestine, where he fell seriously ill and returned to Germany in the spring of 1936. His next attempted to emigrate via Florence in 1937, Lugano in 1938 and Havana in Cuba in 1939. In the summer of 1940, he reached the USA, where he settled in Rochester in the US state of New York and lived there until his death.

== Civic engagement ==
- To mark the 300th anniversary of Warburg Grammar School in 1924, he donated many magnificent editions of ancient and German classics to the school. He donated further volumes in 1928.

== Claims for restitution due to Nazi persecution ==
In the Claims Resolution Trust recognized the Nazi persecution of Emil Herz. His heirs have registered search requests for 39 of the artworks that were looted from him.

== Publications ==
- Denke ich an Deutschland in der Nacht. Berlin 1951; Neuauflage Museumsverein Warburg, 2005; englische Übersetzung: Before the fury. Jews and Germans before Hitler. New York 1966
- Englische Schauspieler und Englisches Schauspiel zur Zeit Shakespeares in Deutschland. Hamburg 1903; Neuauflage 1977
- Die Banken der Pfalz und ihre Beziehungen zur Pfälzer Industrie. Schweitzer, München 1903

== Literature ==
- Herz, Emil Emanuel, in: Werner Röder, Herbert A. Strauss (Hrsg.): Biographisches Handbuch der deutschsprachigen Emigration nach 1933. Bd. 1: Politik, Wirtschaft, Öffentliches Leben. München : Saur 1980, S. 289 (Ernest Herz auf Seite 276)
- Herz, Emil (Emanuel). In: Ernst Fischer: Verleger, Buchhändler & Antiquare aus Deutschland und Österreich in der Emigration nach 1933: Ein biographisches Handbuch. Elbingen: Verband Deutscher Antiquare, 2011, S. 131f.
