= Daniela Herz-Schnoekel =

German businesswoman (born 1954)

- Born: 1954 (age 71–72)
- Known for: Tchibo
- Spouse: married
- Parent(s): Max Herz and Ingeburg Herz
- Relatives: Michael Herz (brother); Wolfgang Herz (brother); Günter Herz (brother)

Daniela Herz-Schnoekel (born 1954) is a German businesswoman, former part-owner of the German coffee shop and retail chain Tchibo.

== Early life ==
Herz-Schnoekel is the daughter of Max Herz and Ingeburg Herz. Her father co-founded Tchibo in 1949 with Carl Tchilinghiryan.

== Family business ==
In the early 2000s, Daniela Herz-Schnoekel owned 19% of Tchibo, her brother Günter 20,6%. In 2002, the pair pooled their Tchibo shares in the holding company Mayfair. 2003, these three family members bought out Herz-Schnoekel and her brother, Günter Herz's 40% stake. Tchibo is 100% owned by three members of the Herz family, Herz-Schnoekel's mother and two of her brothers, Michael and Wolfgang Herz.

In 2020, she broke the Mayfair holding (which held 40% of the pasta chain Vapiano for example), marking a historic separation with her brother, to focus her investments on real estate alongside her children.

== Career ==
According to Forbes, Herz-Schnoekel has a net worth of $2.8 billion, as of May 2015.

== Personal life ==
Herz-Schnoekel is married, and lives in Hamburg. In 2008, her brother Joachim died in a motorboat accident.
