= Zack Heart =

Australian Actor and Television Personality

Nicholas Zack Heart
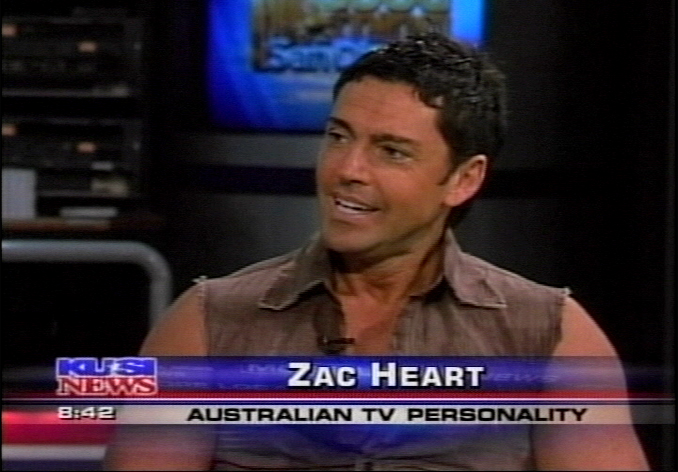
- Outback Zack on KUSI News, 2009.
- Born: Nicholas Zack Samuel Heart; 12 October; Melbourne, Victoria, Australia
- Occupation: Actor / Television Presenter / Writer / Producer
- Years active: 1993 – present
- Agent: phirgun.com
- Website: nickheart.com

Nicholas Zack Samuel Heart is an Australian Professional Actor and Television and Film Personality. Heart is recognized as an Actor, Voice Actor, Television Presenter, and Wildlife Expert, conservationist. Since September 2025, Heart has played the lead role in 5 films and starring in 2. He is also starring in a new wildlife Television series set to go into production in summer of 2026.

== Early life ==
Heart studying Zoology and Conservation Biology at NMIT with further studies in ethology and wildlife management. He played baseball with the Fitzroy Lions from an early age up until 17, whilst also becoming a talented golfer achieving a handicap of 4. Heart's main interest was animals and spent his childhood working in the field with his father up until his father was killed in a vehicle accident.

Heart moved into the television and film world at age 17, becoming a professional stunt man with the New Generation Stunts Agency. Heart was trained under the Sanford Meisner acting technique by veteran Australian actress Vikki Blanche, and continued under Australian icon John Orcsik at The Australian Film and Television Academy. Heart has continued his acting schooling with coaches from the Ivana Chubbuck acting school.

== Career ==
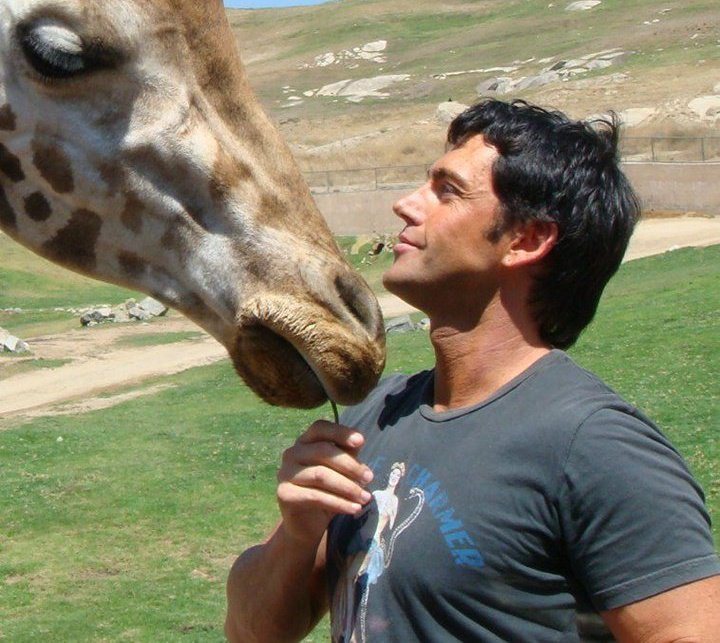
Outback Zack with Giraffe, 2010.

Heart began his career as a stuntman, actor and model at age 17 and debuted on Australian television portraying the criminal "Mackay" in the Seven Network Australian Television series Blue Heelers, which aired for 13 seasons. Heart followed this with the role of the locally well known Pizza Delivery Boy witness on the Seven Network Australia's Most Wanted and went on with recurring stunt actor roles on the Network Ten soap opera Neighbours, and the Australian Broadcasting Corporation hit series Mercury with Geoffrey Rush.

In 1995 Heart made his film debut on the American action film Silver Strand, with Gil Bellows, Nicollette Sheridan, and director George Miller. He followed this film in the role of 'Skinny' the skinhead in the Australian feature film comedy Crackers. Heart performed his own stunts as the character.

In 2009 he received public recognition for Channel 31 Australia C31, broadcasts of Outback Zack's Australian Animal Fire Victims Appeal. Heart wrote, produced, and hosted the one-hour television special which raised up to $500,000.00 for the non-profit animal rescue organisation Wildlife Victoria with broadcasts in Australia and the United States. Heart co-host The Daily Buzz show.

In 2010 Heart relocated from Australia to Hollywood, and became known by audiences as the regular host on Planet X Television appearing in multiple seasons with his "Outback Zack" persona, and starring in American vehicle commercials.

== Filmography ==
List of credits
Year	Title	Role	Production company
2026	House of Flies (Feature Film)	Lead: Joseph Corbin	Kid Wonder & AKA Dinosaur Productions
2026	Cat Enright & the Opium Equation (Feature Film)	Supporting: Hill Henley	Sally Blue Productions
2026	Soft Serve (Feature Film)	Lead/Starring: Mr. Charles	Donald Napier III
2026	Altar Call (Feature Film)	Lead/Starring: Sheriff Thomas Kirby	T. Studios Productions
2026	Punk Robbers (Short Film)	Lead/Starring: Milton Moneybags	Brayden Fox Films
2025	John (Short Film)	Lead: The Doctor aka The Hitman	Noah Collins
2025	Renegades From Hell: Chapter Black (Feature Film)	Lead: General Orson Locke	The Omni Committee
2024	Pulling The Trigger (Short Film)	Lead: Cino	Wesley Carlton Films
2024	Soft Serve (Short Film)	Mr. Charles	Donald Napier III
2024	Babylon Blues (Short Film)	Lead: Daniel Sykes	Leon lane
2023	Machination (TV series)	Lead: Tony Welland	Kimaro Sun
2023	The Heights (Film)	Supporting: Lucas Matthews	Another Coach Productions
2021	A Deal (Short Film)	Lead: Ben	Andrew Essig
2021	My Overpriced Lawyer (Short Film)	Lead: Jimmy	Andrew Essig
2021	No Going Back (Short Film)	Lead: Josh	Andrew Essig
2021	A Funny Way of Showing It (Short Film)	Lead: Ernie	Andrew Essig
2010–2025	Planet X Television (TV series)	Starring: Self and Outback Zack	Planet X Television
2013	Planet X Television (TV series) Outback Zack The Man from Downunder	Starring: Outback Zack	Planet X Television
2010	Planet X Television (TV series) Adventure With Whales	Starring: Outback Zack	Planet X Television
2010	Planet X Television (TV series) Extremity Games	Starring: Himself – Host	Planet X Television
2010	Planet X Television (TV series) Teva Games	Starring: Outback Zack	Planet X Television
2010	Planet X Television (TV series) Bali Surf	Starring: Himself – Host	Planet X Television
2010	Planet X Television (TV series) Boarder 1	Starring: Himself – Host	Planet X Television
2010	Planet X Television (TV series) Horse Jumping Special	Starring: Outback Zack	Planet X Television
2010	Planet X Television (TV series) Boarder 2	Starring: Outback Zack	Planet X Television
2010	Planet X Television (TV series) Best of Oz Winter 1	Starring: Outback Zack	Planet X Television
2010	Planet X Television (TV series) Best of Oz Winter 2	Starring: Outback Zack	Planet X Television
2010	Planet X Television (TV series) Icer X 1	Starring: Outback Zack	Planet X Television
2010	Planet X Television (TV series) Board Up	Starring: Himself – Host	Planet X Television
2010	Planet X Television (TV series) Icer X 2	Starring: Outback Zack	Planet X Television
2010	Planet X Television (TV series) PX rail 1	Starring: Himself – Host	Planet X Television
2009	KUSI-TV (TV series)	Starring: Outback Zack	KUSI News
2008	The Daily Buzz (TV series)	Starring: Himself – Host	ACME Communications
2008	Outback Zack's Australian Animal fire Victims Appeal (Talk Show)	Starring: Outback Zack	Outback Zack Productions
1998	Crackers (Feature Film)	Supporting: Skinny the Skinhead	The Australian Film Commission
1997	Australia's Most Wanted (TV series)	Johnny the murder witness	Grundy Television Australia
1996	Neighbours (TV series)	Max	Grundy Television Australia
1996	Mercury (TV series)	Stunt Actor – (as Simmons Nick)	Australian Broadcast Commission
1995	Silver Strand (Feature Film)	Featured/Stunt Actor	MGM
1995	Correlli (TV series)	Morris Moore	Australian Broadcast Commission
1995	Neighbours (TV series)	Stunt Actor	Grundy Television Australia
1995	Janus (TV series)	Nick	Australian Broadcast Commission
1995	Blue Heelers (TV series)	Supporting: Mr. Mackay	Southern Star
