= Heinrich Herzig =

Swiss painter

- Born: 28 June 1887; Rheineck, Switzerland
- Died: 16 August 1964 (aged 77); Rheineck, Switzerland
- Occupation: Painter

== Heinrich Herzig ==
Heinrich Herzig (1887–1964) was a Swiss painter. The information about him is sparse.

== Life ==
Heinrich Herzig, citizen of Walzenhausen AR, grew up in Rheineck. It was his wish from an early age to become a painter. From 1904 to 1906 he first trained as an embroidery draftsman at the drawing school of the St. Gallen Trade Museum.

From 1908 to 1914 he trained as a painter at the Munich School of Applied Arts under the teachers Wilhelm Diez and Robert Engels. His preference was painting with oil and water colors. In the years 1914 to 1917 Herzig visited i.a. also private art schools in Berlin and Dresden, where he came into contact with the current of expressionism. From 1915 to 1917 he worked in Plauen and at times worked as a designer in the porcelain factory in Meissen. From 1916 to 1918 he worked part-time in his brother's embroidery company in Jocketa in Vogtland, where he could use half the time for his artistic work.

From 1918 Herzig worked in Altstätten, then in Rheineck as a freelance painter. This was followed by study trips to Austria, Germany and especially to Italy, which suited his open nature and inspired him to many southern pictorial themes. In 1919 he returned to Rheineck. The municipality of Rheineck provided the artist with a studio under the old castle. In between, he also gave drawing lessons at the local school. The result was a wide range of expressive oil paintings and watercolors, as well as woodcuts, glass paintings, illustrations and muralswith illustrations of anecdotes from everyday life and motifs from nature. In 1921 Herzig married Ida Bänziger, with whom he had two children.

Herzig received honorary citizenship in Rheineck in 1959, and after his death a street in the village was named after him.

== Works ==
Works by Heinrich Herzig can be found in the museums of St. Gallen, Kunsthaus Zürich, Kunstmuseum Chur, Glarus, Winterthur, Dresden, Konstanz, Municipal Gallery Munich, Ulm and others.

- Snowy landscape, painted 1927
- Memory of Italy, 1932 oil painting
- Gant in Appenzellerland, oil painting from 1948
- On the Old Rhine, painted 1949
- Study from Nature, drawing, 1951
- Mother and Child in the Rhine Valley, 1957
- Winter near Wolfhalden, painted 1964
