= Carl Tchilinghiryan =

German businessman

- Born: 27 February 1910
- Died: 8 May 1987 (aged 77)
- Occupation: German businessman

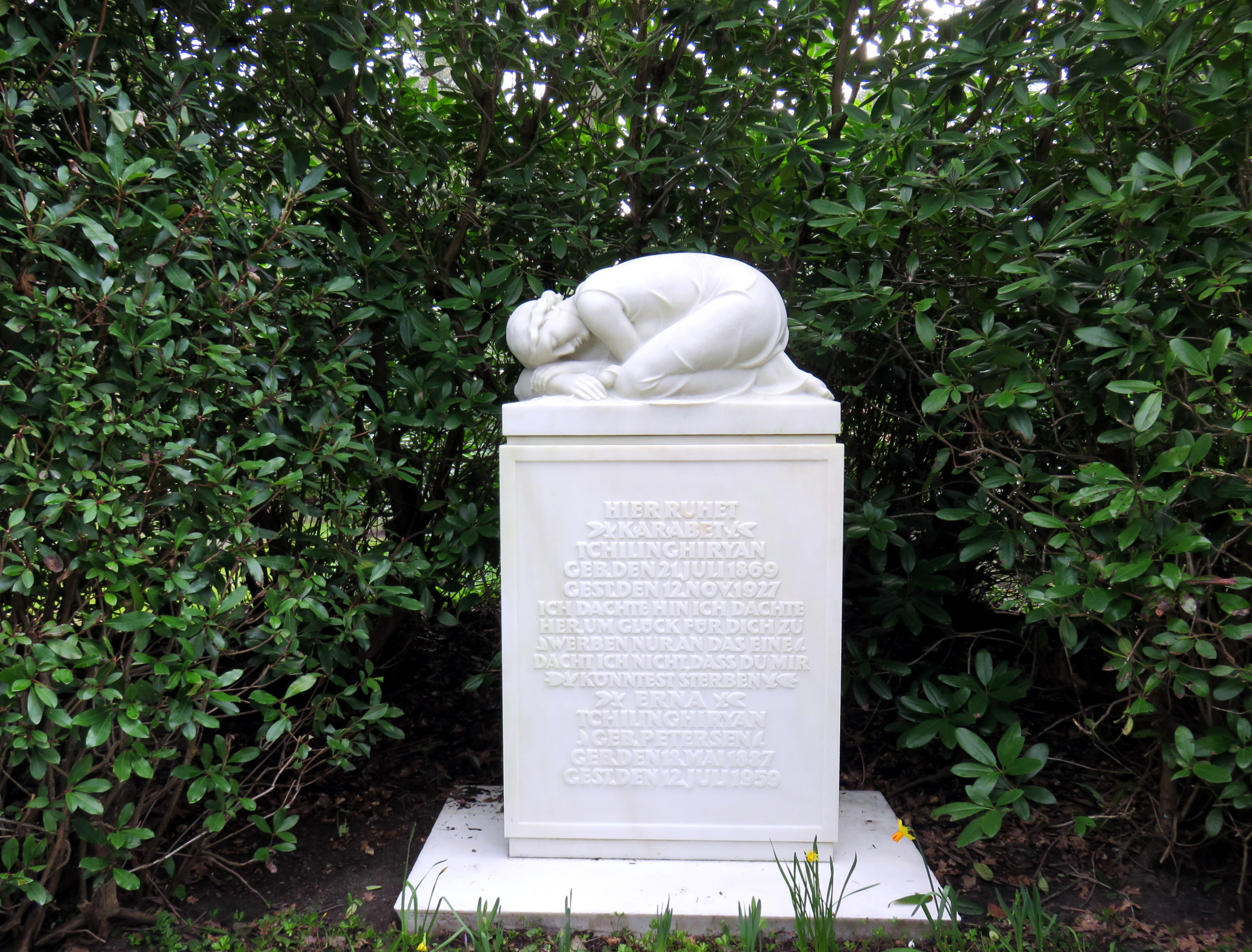

Carl Tchilinghiryan (27 February 1910 – 8 May 1987) was a German businessman of Armenian origin, who co-founded the coffee house Tchibo.

== Career ==
In 1949, together with Max Herz, he founded the "Frisch-Röst-Kaffee Carl Tchiling GmbH", which today is known as Tchibo.

Before founding the Tchibo company Tchilinghiryan dealt as a dried fruit specialist in dates, figs and trail mix.

In order to facilitate the pronunciation of his Armenian name for future Tchibo customers, Tchilinghiryan changed the spelling of his name to "Carl Tchiling-Hiryan".

== Death ==
Tchilinghiryan is buried at the Ohlsdorf Cemetery in Hamburg, Germany, in a family tomb together with his parents Karabet Tchilinghiryan (21 July 1869 – 12 November 1927) and Erna Tchilinghiryan, née Petersen (18 May 1887 – 12 July 1959).

Tchibo is 100% owned by the Herz family, Ingeburg Herz (Max Herz's widow), and two of her sons, Michael Herz and Wolfgang Herz, through their company Maxingvest AG.
