= Hurtz =

Hurtz is a surname. Notable people with the surname include:

- Emily Hurtz (born 1990), Australian field hockey player

== See also ==
- Hertz (surname)
- Herz (surname)
