= Julia Herz =

German politician (born 1997)

Member of the Landtag of Hesse
- Incumbent
- Assumed office 18 January 2024

Personal details
- Born: 1997 (age 28–29) Berlin
- Party: Alliance 90/The Greens (since 2017)

Julia Herz (born 1997 in Berlin) is a German politician serving as a member of the Landtag of Hesse since 2024. She has served as mayor of Mitte in Kassel since 2021.
