= John Hertz =

John Hertz may refer to:

- John D. Hertz (1879–1961), American businessman
- John H. Herz (1908–2005), American political scientist
- John Hertz (fan), American attorney and science fiction fan
