= Max Herz (businessman) =

German businessman, co-founder of the German coffee shop and retail chain Tchibo

Max Herz (1905–1965) was a German businessman, co-founder of the German coffee shop and retail chain Tchibo.

In 1949, together with Carl Tchilinghiryan, he co-founded the "Frisch-Röst-Kaffee Carl Tchiling GmbH", which today is known as Tchibo.

He was married to Ingeburg Herz. They had four sons, Michael Herz, Wolfgang Herz, Günter Herz, Joachim Herz, and a daughter Daniela Herz-Schnoekel.
