= Demachy =

Demachy is a French surname. Notable people with the surname include:

- François Demachy, French perfumer
- Pierre-Antoine Demachy (1723–1807), French artist
- Robert Demachy (1859–1936), French photographer

== See also ==
- Le Sieur de Machy, 17th-century French musician
