= Carl Herz =

German lawyer and Member of Parliament

- Born: 21 December 1831; Würzburg
- Died: 8 May 1897 (aged 65); Aschaffenburg
- Occupation: lawyer

Carl Herz (21 December 1831 – 8 May 1897, Aschaffenburg) was a German lawyer, and, between 1871 and 1883, Member of Parliament (Reichstagsabgeordneter).

== Life ==
=== The lawyer ===
Carl Herz was born into a catholic family in Würzburg, where he attended school locally. He began his university studies in 1851, studying Jurisprudence at Würzburg and then at Heidelberg. This was followed by a period of educational tours ("Bildungsreisen") abroad, which took in France, Italy, Austria, Switzerland, North Germany and Denmark. He obtained a job with the district court in Nuremberg in 1868. After this, in 1871, he became a "supply prosecutor", substituting for any absences of permanent officers, in Aschaffenburg and Munich. Later in the same year he obtained a permanent post as a public prosecutor in Munich.

Between 1883 and 1897 Carl Herz served as president of the district court ("Landgerichtspräsident") in Aschaffenburg.

=== The politician ===
==== Bavaria ====
Late in 1869, ahead of the 1870 session, he was elected to the lower house of the Bavarian parliament, sitting as a member of the recently founded Bavarian Progressive Party ("Bayerische Fortschrittspartei"), and representing the Weißenburg (Middle Franconia) electoral district. Following the upheavals that cleared the way for German unification the assembly mutated into a regional parliament (Landtag). Herz remained a member till 1887, although in 1881 the electoral district he represented changed, when he became the member for Würzburg.

Within the chamber he served on various parliamentary commissions. He was a long-time chairman (then deputy chairman) of the petitions commission.

==== Germany ====
From March 1871 Herz was able to combine his Bavarian parliamentary duties in Munich with membership of the newly established National Parliament ("Reichstag") in Berlin, again as a member of the Progressive Party ("Deutsche Fortschrittspartei" / DFP). Here again, he sat on several parliamentary commissions, including the petitions commission.

Between 1871 and 1883, when he resigned his mandate in the national parliament for the last time, he represented an unusually disparate succession of electoral districts:

- 1871-1874 Middle Franconia 4 (Eichstätt)
- 1874-1877 Berlin 3
- 1877-1878 Middle Franconia 3 (Ansbach-Schwabach). He resigned his seat in July 1878.
- 1881-1883 Upper Franconia 3 (Forchheim)
