= Steve Hertz =

Steve Hertz may refer to:

- Steve Hertz (baseball coach) (born 1950), former head baseball coach of the UC Irvine Anteaters and Gonzaga Bulldogs
- Steve Hertz (third baseman) (1945–2025), American Major League Baseball player
