= Hurt =

Hurt or Hurtful may refer to:

- Suffering
- Pain
- Injury

== Film and television ==
- Hurt (2003 film), a Canadian drama film
- Hurt (2009 film), an American horror film
- Hurt (2015 film), a Canadian documentary film
- Hurt (2018 film), an American horror film
- "Hurt" (Band of Gold), a 1996 television episode
- "Hurt" (The Good Doctor), a 2020 television episode
- "Hurt" (The Shield), a 2005 television episode
- "Hurtful!", a 2011 episode of the web series Battle for Dream Island

== Music ==
=== Groups ===
- Hurt (band), American rock band

=== Albums ===
- Hurt: The EP, a 2011 extended play by British singer Leona Lewis which features a cover of the Nine Inch Nails song
- Hurt (EP), 2015, by Hawthorne Heights

=== Songs ===
- "Hurt" (Roy Hamilton song), 1954, covered by several other artists, most notably in 1961 by Timi Yuro
- "Hurt" (Nine Inch Nails song), 1995, covered by several other artists, most notably in 2002 by Johnny Cash
- "Hurt" (Christina Aguilera song), 2006
- "Hurt" (T.I. song), 2007
- "Hurtful" (song), a 2008 song by Erik Hassle
- "The Hurt", by Cat Stevens, 1973
- "Hurt", a song by Jamala on the 2013 album All or Nothing
- "Hurt", a song by Tom Petty & the Heartbreakers on the 1978 album You're Gonna Get It!
- "Hurt", a song by Dean Chamberlain on the 1980 LP "Code Blue", covered by Spock's Beard on their European edition of the 1999 album Day for Night
- "Hurt", a song by Exo from the 2015 album Exodus
- "Hurt", a song by New Order on the 1982 single "Temptation"
- "Hurt", a song by Re-Flex, from the 1983 album The Politics of Dancing
- "Hurt", a song by Oliver Tree from his 2019 EP Do you Feel Me?
- "Hurt", a song by OneRepublic from the 2024 album Artificial Paradise
- "Hurt", a song by NewJeans on the 2022 EP New Jeans
- "Hurt", a song by Sasha Alex Sloan on the 2018 EP Sad Girl
- "Hurt", a song by T-ara on the 2013 EP Again
- "Hurt", a song by Wage War, from the album Pressure
- "Hurt", a song by Yung Lean, from the mixtape Unknown Death 2002
- "Hurt (Interlude)", a song by Blink-182 on the 2023 album One More Time...
- "The Hurt", a song by The Jacksons on the 1984 album Victory

== People ==
- Hurt (surname), people with the surname

== Places ==
- Hurt, Virginia, United States

== Other uses ==
- Heterogeneous Urban RSTA Team, an aerial surveillance project in the United States
- Hurt, a blue roundel in heraldry

== See also ==
- Hurst (disambiguation)
- Hurts (disambiguation)
