= Hertz (disambiguation) =

The hertz (symbol: Hz) is the SI derived unit of frequency.

Hertz may also refer to:

== People ==
- Hertz (name), a German surname that has also been used as a given name.
  - Heinrich Hertz, (1857–1894), German physicist after whom the unit of frequency was named
  - Gustav Hertz (1887–1975), German experimental physicist (see Franck–Hertz experiment)

== Places ==
- 16761 Hertz, a minor planet
- Hertz (crater), on Moon

== Arts and entertainment ==
- "Hertz", a song by Amyl and the Sniffers from their 2021 album Comfort to Me
- "Hertz", a song by Eden from his 2020 album No Future
- Pierre Jerksten, a Swedish disc jockey, working under the alias Hertz.

== Companies and organizations ==
- The Hertz Corporation, American car and equipment rental company
- Hertz Foundation, charitable scholarship foundation for science education in Livermore, California

== See also ==
- Herz (disambiguation)
- Hurts (disambiguation)
- 50Hertz Transmission GmbH, one of the four electric transmission operators in Germany
- Franck–Hertz experiment, a fundamental experiment in quantum physics
- Herts, an abbreviation of Hertfordshire
