= Adolf Herz =

Austrian-Swiss engineer and inventor

Adolf Herz (1862 in Nový Jičín – 1947 in Lucerne) was an Austrian-Swiss engineer and inventor. He co-designed one of the first modern blood pressure monitors.

== Life ==
Herz was born as son of a well-to-do brewery owner. After completing the Realschule in Brno, he studied mechanical engineering at the k&k Technische Hocshschule in Vienna, where he eventually settled down and obtained "das Bürgerrecht". He opened a werkstatt to produce some of his inventions, mainly related to automobiles, which then were in their infancy. He invented a much improved sparkplug, and a more effective shock absorber.

Together with his brother Max, a cardiologist and Privatdozent, he designed one of the first modern blood pressure monitors. He also became active as an amateur photographer, and in general participated in the typical Viennese "Kaffeehaus" culture, in the Kaffeehaus Central.

From 1905 to 1913 Adolf Herz lived in New York City, where he helped his younger brother Leopold set up a business exploiting his personal inventions in the United States.

In 1918, after the end of World War I and the end of the Habsburg monarchy, Herz left Austria for Switzerland with an Austrian passport. His wife, May Priggen, who had worked for him in Vienna, and was born there as a British subject, followed him to Switzerland. They first lived in Lugano, Hertenstein, and Weggis, while searching for employment. He had lost much of his investments during the postwar economic crisis and the hyper inflation in Austria, and the rest due to the fraudulent bankruptcy of the Austrian Bank.
