= Michael Herz (businessman) =

German businessman (born 1943)

- Born: September 28, 1943 (age 82)
- Occupation: Businessman
- Known for: Co-owner, Maxingvest AG (Tchibo)
- Title: Member of management board, Maxingvest
- Spouse: Married
- Parent(s): Max Herz and Ingeburg Herz
- Relatives: Wolfgang Herz (brother); Günter Herz (brother); Daniela Herz-Schnoekel (sister)

Michael Herz (born September 28, 1943) is a German businessman, co-owner of holdings company Maxingvest AG.

== Family business ==
In 1965, after the death of his father Max Herz, who co-founded Tchibo in 1949 with Carl Tchilinghiryan, Herz joined Tchibo (later Maxingvest AG) as head of sales.

According to Forbes’ list of global billionaires, Herz is listed at number 360 with a net worth of $4.3 billion as of July 8, 2015. He was the 21st richest man in Germany and in 2003 made the top 10.

Herz bought and reorganized book wholesaler Libri and florist Blume 2000, and prevented the break-up of Beiersdorf AG. His investment in Escada turned out to be a failure and ended in bankruptcy.

== Personal life ==
He is married and lives in Hamburg.

In 2008, his brother Joachim died in a motorboat accident.
