= Leopold Herz =

German politician (1953–2026)

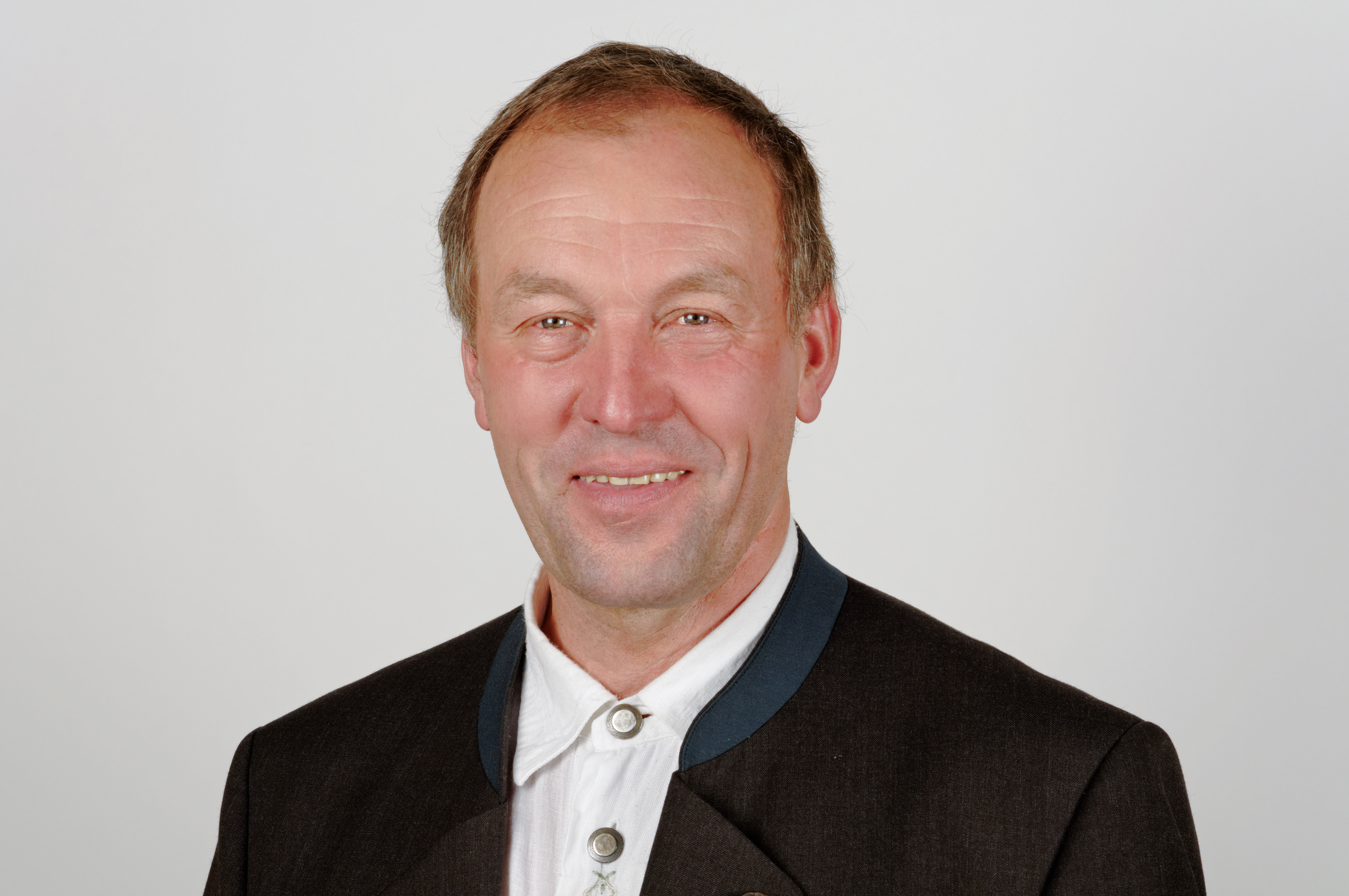
- Herz in 2012

Member of the Landtag of Bavaria
- In office 20 October 2008 – 30 October 2023

Personal details
- Born: 12 June 1953 Wertach, Bavaria, West Germany
- Died: 17 January 2026 (aged 72)
- Party: FW
- Occupation: Farmer

Leopold Herz (12 June 1953 – 17 January 2026) was a German politician. A member of the Free Voters of Bavaria, he served in the Landtag of Bavaria from 2008 to 2023.

Herz died on 17 January 2026, at the age of 72.
