= Tchibo =

German coffee retailer

Tchibo GmbH
- Type: Private GmbH
- Founded: 1949; 77 years ago
- Founder: Max Herz; Carl Tchilinghiryan
- Headquarters: Hamburg, Germany
- Number of locations: 550 shops (Germany); 320 (rest of world)
- Area served: Austria; Czech Republic; Hungary; Liechtenstein; Malta; Netherlands; Poland; Romania; Slovakia; Switzerland; Turkiye; UAE; UK
- Key people: Werner Weber (CEO); Ingeburg Herz, Michael Herz, Wolfgang Herz (co-owners)
- Revenue: ▼€3.222 billion (2017); ▼€3.308 billion (2016); ▼€3.362 billion (2015)
- Number of employees: 11.318
- Parent: Maxingvest AG
- Website: www.tchibo.com

Tchibo is a German chain of coffee retailers and cafés known for its range of non-coffee products that change weekly. The latter includes: clothing, furniture, household items, electronics and electrical appliances. In Germany, Tchibo's slogan is "Every week a new world" (German: Jede Woche eine neue Welt). Tchibo has further expanded its product range to sell services such as travel, insurance, and mobile-phone contracts.

With over 1,000 shops, Tchibo is one of Germany's largest retail chains. The company is headquartered in Hamburg. Tchibo's coffee is sold in supermarkets and other smaller stores in the United States, Canada, Czechia, Saudi Arabia, Slovakia, Slovenia, Bulgaria, Romania, Turkey, Hungary, Ukraine, Syria, Jordan, ~~Russia~~, United Arab Emirates, Poland, Ireland, United Kingdom, Switzerland, Liechtenstein, and Lebanon. It is also sold online.

== History ==
=== Founding ===
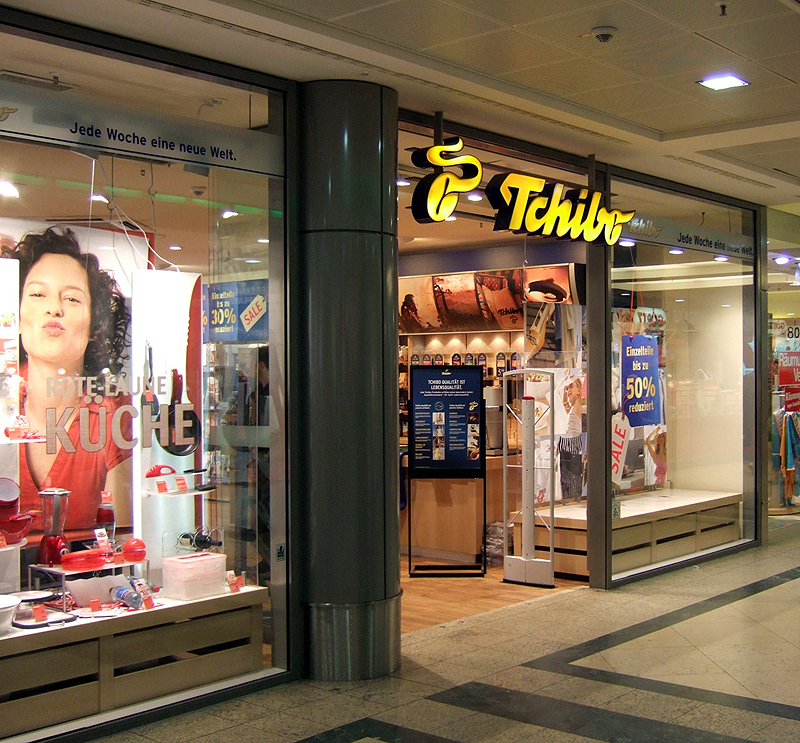
Shop in Darmstadt

Tchibo was founded in 1949 in Hamburg by Max Herz and Carl Tchilinghiryan, and still maintains its headquarters in the north of the city. The name Tchibo is an abbreviation for Tchiling and Bohnen (coffee beans). During its formative years, Tchibo concentrated on a mail-order service of freshly roasted coffee beans, processed in the company's own roasting facility in the Hamburg district of Hoheluft.

=== Expansion ===
In 1977, Tchibo purchased shares of Beiersdorf and in 1980 became the majority shareholder of the Hamburg cigarette producer Reemtsma. The Reemtsma stake was sold in 2002 to Imperial Tobacco for €5.2 billion. In 1986, they tried their luck in the video game console market and released the Tele-Fever home video game console. It sold only very few units. After buying its rival Eduscho in 1997, Tchibo became the market leader in Germany with 20%. In the 1990s, Tchibo began to expand to countries outside Germany and now has shops in Switzerland, Liechtenstein, Austria, the Netherlands, Poland, Hungary, Slovakia, the Czech Republic and Turkey. Entry into the US market was planned in the early 2000s, but later cancelled. As of mid-2020 Tchibo operates a mail order business in the United States selling ground and whole-bean coffee as well as proprietary coffee makers.

Tchibo sold the cigarette brand Davidoff to the UK-based company Imperial Tobacco for €540 million in 2006; the rights for the brand Davidoff café remained with Tchibo. Tchibo has started distribution of its brand Davidoff café to the US.

=== Reorganisation ===
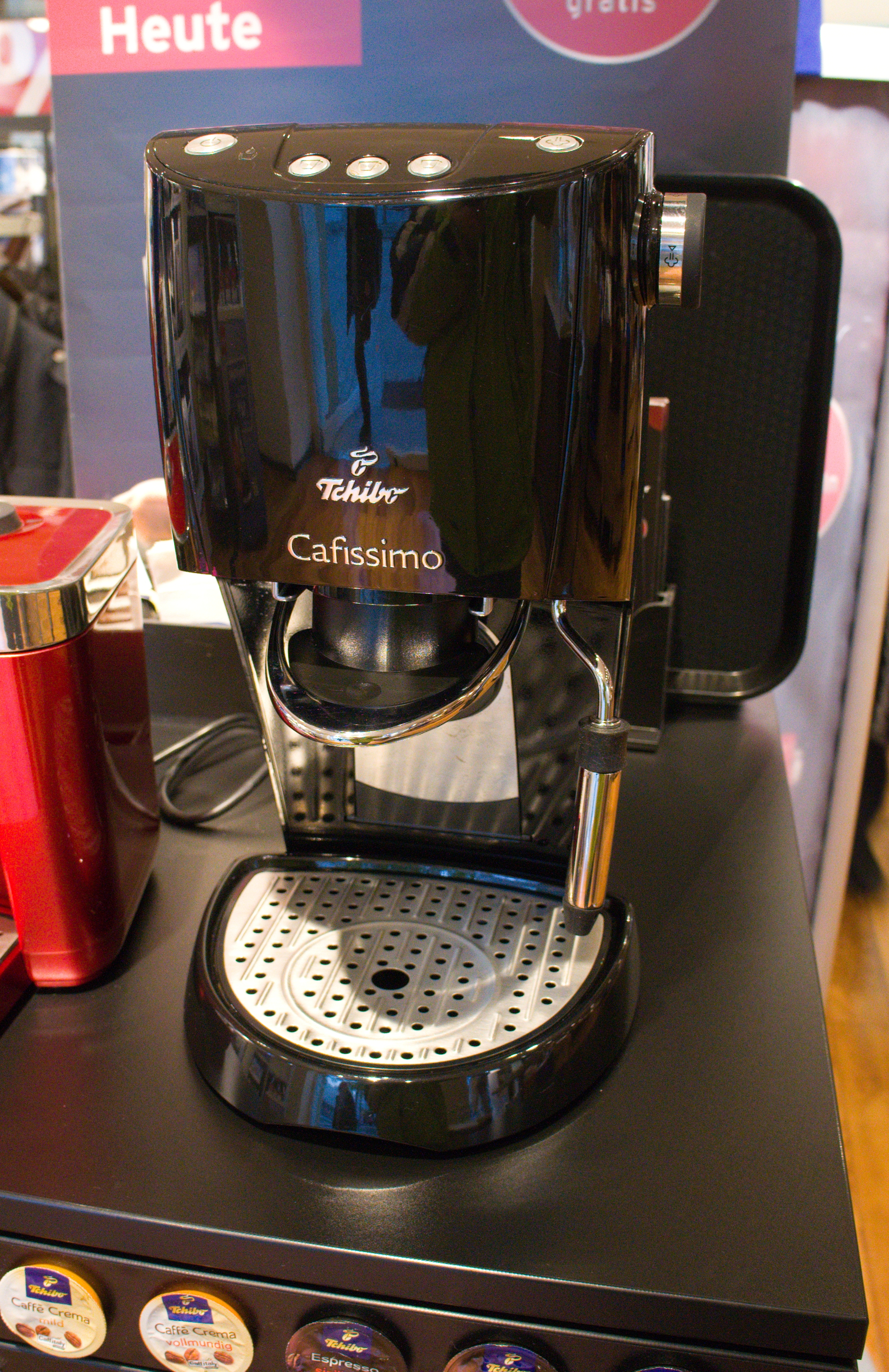
Tchibo Cafissimo coffeemaker

The company presented a reorganisation programme to its employees at a staff meeting on 7 December 2007, with the aim of returning the business to growth by 2010.

In the UK, following a consultation period, Tchibo GB decided to close half of its retail stores and re-structure the head office and field teams. The UK board was reduced from 11 directors to 4.

In November 2008, a Tchibo spokesman announced that the concessions in Somerfield and Sainsbury's supermarkets would close in 2009, blaming difficult macroeconomic conditions in Britain. Tchibo's lack of success in the British market was summarised by Retail Week as due to it being "a glorified pound shop".

In early 2009, the company confirmed it would leave the UK market, by selling its leases.

All of the Tchibo GB stores were closed by the end of October 2009. The UK online webstore followed on 1 September 2010.

A "new and improved" Tchibo Online Shop was launched in the UK on 28 June 2016

In August 2016, Tchibo acquired Scotland based roasting company Matthew Algie.

== Corporate structure ==
Tchibo is owned by Maxingvest AG, which changed its name from Tchibo Holding AG in 2007. It is 100% owned by three members of the Herz family, Ingeburg Herz (Max Herz's widow), and two of her sons, Michael Herz and Wolfgang Herz. In 2003, they bought out their brother, Gunter, and sister, Daniela Herz-Schnoekel. Their brother Joachim died in a motorboat accident in 2008.

Maxingvest AG is the largest shareholder of the listed company Beiersdorf.

In 2002, Tchibo had 850 shops and 22,000 so-called Frische-Depots in bread shops and supermarkets, where shelves bearing the company's "brand" sell packaged coffee (with customer-operated coffee grinders provided in some locations) alongside non-food articles such as clothes and accessories, as well as sporting and household goods.

== See also ==
- List of coffeehouse chains
- Tele-Fever
