= Wolfgang Herz =

German businessman (born 1950)

- Born: 1950 (age 75–76)
- Occupation: member of Maxingvest's Supervisory Board
- Known for: Co-owner, Tchibo
- Parent(s): Max Herz and Ingeburg Herz
- Relatives: Michael Herz (brother); Günter Herz (brother); Daniela Herz-Schnoekel (sister)

Wolfgang Herz (born 1950) is a German billionaire businessman, co-owner of the German coffee shop and retail chain Tchibo.

== Family business ==
Herz is the son of Max Herz and Ingeburg Herz. His father co-founded Tchibo in 1949 with Carl Tchilinghiryan.

In 2003, along with his mother and brother, he bought out his other brother, Günter Herz, and sister, Daniela Herz-Schnoekel.

== Personal life ==
According to Forbes, Herz has a net worth of US$4.5 billion, as of September 2022. Herz lives in Hamburg.
