= Karl Neumeyer =

German Jewish jurist

Karl Neumeyer (September 19, 1869 – July 17, 1941) was a German Jewish jurist who, persecuted by Nazis, committed suicide. He was professor of international law at the Ludwig-Maximilians-Universität München until 1933 when the Nazis came to power in Germany.

== Early life ==
Karl Neumeyer was the younger brother of the judge and chairman of the Association of Bavarian and Jewish Communities Alfred Neumeyer. He attended the Maximiliansgymnasium and then studied law in Munich, Berlin and Geneva. In 1900, he married Anna Hirschhorn, with whom he had two children: Alfred (1901-1973) and Fritz (1905).

In 1901, he obtained his habilitation at the Ludwig-Maximilians-Universität München, becoming associate professor in 1908. He dealt with private international law and founded the legal field of international administrative law. In 1926, he received the title of full professor. In 1931, he became faculty dean.

After Hitler came to power in 1933, Neumeyer was persecuted due to his Jewish origins. In 1934, he was banned from teaching and publishing. In 1941, faced with imminent deportation and murder, he and his wife committed suicide. He is buried in the New Jewish Cemetery in Munich.

== Commemorations ==
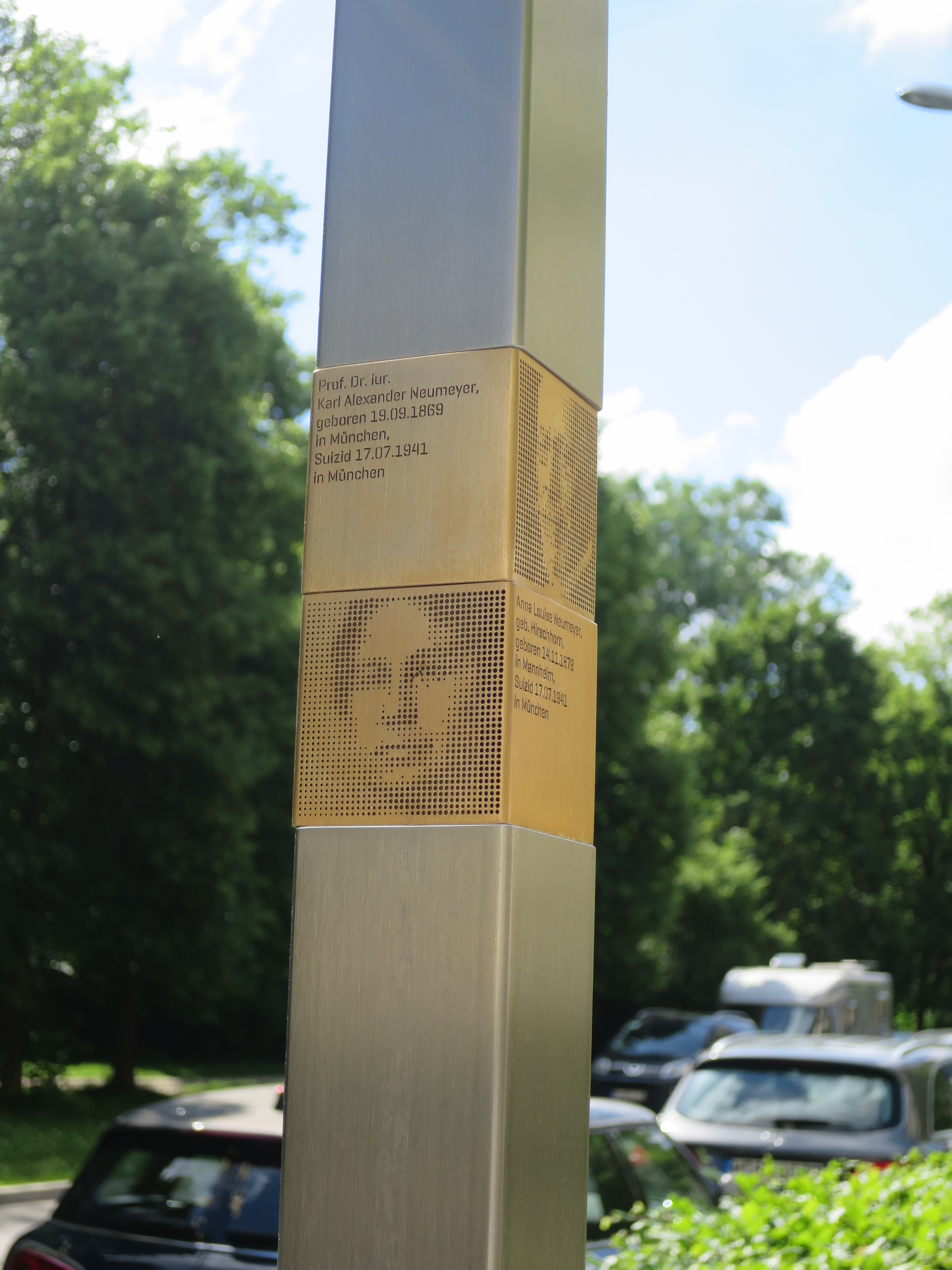
Munich Memorial for Karl and Anna Louise Neumeyer

In Munich, several sites commemorate Karl Neumeyer. In July 2019, a memorial sign was installed at Königinstraße 35a in Maxvorstadt. In 1962, Neumeyerstraße in Allach-Untermenzing was named after him. In 2008, the building of the Faculty of Law of LMU Munich at Veterinärstraße 5 was named Karl-Neumeyer-Haus. It already hosted a Neumeyer hall and a memorial plaque.

== Bibliography ==
- Pfoertner, Helga (2001–2005). Mit der Geschichte leben : Mahnmale, Gedenkstätten, Erinnerungsorte für die Opfer des Nationalsozialismus in München 1933-1945. München: Utz. ISBN 3-89675-859-4. OCLC 51799757.
- Christian Waldhoff (1999). "Neumeyer, Karl". Neue Deutsche Biographie (in German). Vol. 19. Berlin: Duncker & Humblot. pp. 172–173. (full text online).
- Werner, Alfred (1982). "Jüdische Juristen in München". In Lamm, Hans (ed.). Vergangene Tage : jüdische Kultur in München (Erw. und neu durchgesehene Ausg. des 1958 erschienenen Bandes "Von Juden in München--ein Gedenkbuch." ed.). München: Langen Müller Verlag. pp. 323–328. ISBN 3-7844-1867-8. OCLC 8308397.
- von Bonhorst, Heinrich (1988). "Karl Neumeyer". In Tremi, Manfred; Weigand, Wolf (eds.). Geschichte und Kultur der Juden in Bayern. München: Saur. pp. 257–261. ISBN 978-3-11-154857-9. OCLC 907080894.
- Göppinger, Horst (1990). "Karl Neumeyer". Juristen jüdischer Abstammung im "Dritten Reich" : Entrechtung und Verfolgung (2 ed.). München: C.H. Beck. pp. 235f. ISBN 3-406-33902-6. OCLC 22006256.
