= Anna Stankus =

Anna Stankus is a circus performer who specialises in hula hoop manipulation whilst also incorporating rhythmic gymnastics and contortion in her acts. She is currently on tour with Cirque du Soleil Kooza for its North American tour. Since first beginning her career in 2007, she has gone on to perform in many productions worldwide including for Cirque du Soleil, Cirque Le Noir, Franco Dragone shows and in various variety shows in her hometown of Las Vegas.

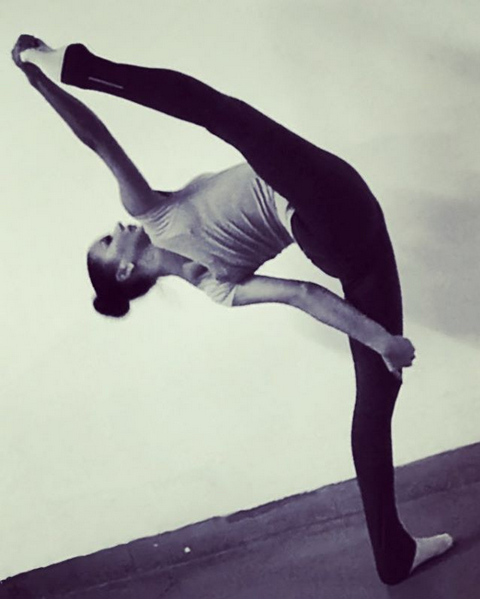
Anna Stankus is a hula hoop artist currently performing for Cirque du Soleil's Amaluna

== Early life and career ==
Anna Stankus was born in west Ukraine in Chernivtsy City on April 9, 1986. At the age of only four-years-old Anna began training with Ukraine's top rhythmic gymnastics academy, the Deriugina School located in Kyiv. During her time there Anna went on to win national and international awards in ribbon, club, ball, rope and hoop events. When she was 18, inspired by videos of Cirque du Soleil artists, Anna began her professional career performing her own dynamic contortion with hoops manipulation act before joining her first Cirque production in 2010.

Since then Anna has traveled the world performing in Japan, China, Dubai, Abu Dhabi, Russia, Switzerland, Germany, Italy, Monte Carlo, Netherlands, Austria, the Philippines and more. She is currently based in Las Vegas, Nevada. She has performed in many popular Las Vegas shows including "V - The Ultimate Variety Show" and 'Best New Show' winner in "Zombie Burlesque". In 2016 Anna told Al Arabiya English, “We’ve done this all our lives…it’s what we do for a living.”

== Performances ==
- 2017-Present, Cirque du Soleil Amaluna, (Touring), Performer
- 2016, World of Wonders at Okada Manila, (Philippines), Performer
- 2016, Cirque Le Noir - The Dark Side of Cirque Tour, (Abu Dhabi, Dubai, Doha), Performer
- 2016, Zombie Burlesque, (Las Vegas), Performer
- 2016, V - The Ultimate Variety Show, (Las Vegas), Performer
- 2015, Franco Dragone Show, (China), Performer
- 2014, Cirque Le Noir - The Dark Side of Cirque, (China), Performer
- 2014, Cirque Le Noir - The Dark Side of Cirque, (Atlantic City), Performer
- 2014, Cirque Éloize, (Dubai), Performer
- 2013-2014, Cirque du Soleil Koozå, (Touring), Performer
- 2011-2012, Alexander Kunz Theatre Dinnershow, (Saarbrücken, Saarland), Performer
- 2011, Rock Hard Festival, (Gelsenkirchen, Germany), Performer
- 2010, GOP Varieté-Theater, (Hannover), Performer
- 2009, Roncalli's Apollo Variete, (Dusseldorf, Germany), Performer
- 2008, Absinthe, (New York), Performer
