= Mathieu Laplante =

- Occupations: Producer; Director; Choreographer
- Known for: Work on Cirque-style show
- Notable work: Cirque Hawaii

Mathieu Laplante is a producer, director, choreographer, and former circus performer. He was a world-renowned gymnast from the age of 8 through 15 before joining Cirque du Soleil. He has worked on stage with artists such as Michael Jackson, Peter Gabriel, and Janet Jackson. He is best known for his work with Cirque-style shows. He began performing with Cirque du Soleil at the age of 16 and directed his first Cirque-style show at the age of 26.

== Early life and career ==
Laplante is originally from Canada and was a gymnast at the age of 6 years old. Before the age of 8, he had won numerous medals, many trophies and awards from various gymnastic and Judo competitions and events he participated in. He attended Herbert School in St. Francois; a sports and high school program designed for the Canadian Gymnastic Team at Polyvalent de Mortagne in Boucherville, and also had an orange belt in Judo. He trained in numerous circus disciplines including teeter board, bungee, Chinese pole, Aerial hoop, Russian swing, flying trapeze, and more. He was recruited by Cirque du Soleil when he was 16 years of age. He was with them for more than 10 years, performing around the world in shows such as Saltimbanco in Tokyo and the European Tour and O at the Bellagio in Las Vegas. In 2005, he was hired to create the show concept for Cirque Hawaii, with part of his duties including making the final decisions on casting, music, and scenery creation. He also worked as the acrobat consultant and head coach on House of Dancing Water directed by Franco Dragone which won a Thea Award in 2012 from the Themed Entertainment Association.

Laplante was the president and owner of Utmost Entertainment Production, a company he founded in 1998. He has performed work such as Special Event Artistic Coordinator for Cirque Du Soleil and Head of Acrobatic Training for the World Newest most Spectacular Show in Macau called House of Dancing Water for Dragone, Inc.. He was also the Acrobatic Choreographer for Dolly Parton theater in Dollywood, Celine Dion, and SeaWorld.

Laplante was also the production assistant on Celine Dion's DVD The Last Show of Celine.

== Production shows ==
- 2013, LE NOIR, The Intimate Side of Cirque, (Singapore), Resident Director & Manager
- 2012, LE NOIR, The Dark Side of Cirque, (Tokyo, Japan), Resident Director & Manager
- 2010-2012, The International All Star Circus (Bahamas), Producer, Creative Designer, & Director
- 2010-2012, Great American Circus (Atlantic City, NJ), Creative Director
- 2010-2012, Cirque Polynesian (Atlantic City, NJ / Alaska Tour), Owner, Creative Designer & Director
- 2010-2012, Cirque Risque (Atlantic City, NJ), Producer, Creative Designer, & Director
- 2010-2012, Cirque Ultra Lounge (Atlantic City, NJ), Creative Designer & Director
- 2010, Sha-Kon-O Hey - Dollywood (Tennessee), Acrobat Choreographer
- 2008, Seas World (San Antonio, TX), Russian Swing Coach
- 2009-2010, House of Dancing Water (Belgium / Paris, France), Acrobat Consultant, Head Coach (casting, research and development, training and formation)
- 2005, Cirque Hawaii (Hawaii), Creative Director

== Television, theater, and movie credits ==
- 2007, Last Show of Celine (Celine Dion DVD), Production Assistant
- 2004, World's Finest (Movie Pilot), Acrobat Instructor
- 2000, Algeria, Stunt Acrobat
- 1998 - 2003, Cirque Du Soleil "O" Las Vegas, Acrobat, Dancer, and Actor
- 1994 - 1997, Cirque Du Soleil, (Saltimbanco, Tokyo, Japan, and European Tour), Acrobat & Actor
