= Kà =

Cirque de Soleil show

Coordinates: 36.102220°N 115.169516°W

- Logo for Cirque du Soleil's Kà
- Company: Cirque du Soleil
- Genre: Contemporary circus
- Show type: Resident show
- Date of premiere: February 3, 2005 (21 years ago)
- Location: MGM Grand, Las Vegas

Creative team
- Creator and director: Robert Lepage
- Director of creation: Guy Caron
- Theatre and set designer: Mark Fisher
- Costume designer: Marie-Chantale Vaillancourt
- Composer: René Dupéré
- Choreographer: Jacques Heim
- Lighting designer: Luc Lafortune
- Sound designer: Jonathan Deans
- Interactive projections: Holger Förterer
- Puppet designer: Michael Curry
- Props designer: Patricia Ruel
- Acrobatic equipment and rigging designer: Jaque Paquin
- Aerial acrobatics designer and head coach, creation: André Simard
- Makeup designer: Nathalie Gagné
- Company founder and CEO: Guy Laliberté

Other information
- Preceded by: Zumanity (2003)
- Succeeded by: Corteo (2005)
- Official website

Kà is a show by Cirque du Soleil at the MGM Grand in Las Vegas, Nevada. Kà describes the story as "the coming of age of a young man and a young woman through their encounters with love, conflict, and the duality of Kà, the fire that can unite or separate, destroy or illuminate."

In its review, the Los Angeles Times stated it "may well be the most lavish production in the history of Western theater. It is surely the most technologically advanced." The New York Times highly praised all the technical aspects and costumes, but felt that it did not succeed in a particularly compelling story; rather, it was "essentially about the kind of wild physical feats that all Cirque shows are about, their jaw-dropping effect multiplied by the huge dimensions of the theatrical space." The show has been seen by more than one million spectators since its opening in February 2005.

== History ==
Created and directed by Robert Lepage, Kà began previews on November 26, 2004, and premiered on February 3, 2005. Kà was the first Cirque du Soleil show to encompass a cohesive storyline. The show's title, Kà, is inspired by the ancient Egyptian belief in the "Kà," an invisible spiritual duplicate of the body that accompanies every human being throughout this life and into the next.

Kà is the first Cirque du Soleil production to deviate from the company's usual format—it presents a more straightforward story, unlike the more abstract visuals of other Cirque productions. The show and the theater cost $165 million to develop.

== Set and technical information ==
Kà lacks a conventional stage with a permanent floor; instead, two giant moving platforms and five smaller lifts and platforms appear to float through a bottomless space. A narrow boardwalk separates the audience from a deep abyss where the stage floor would normally be. From the stage level of the boardwalk up to the high grid is 98 feet (30 m), and the pit drops 51 feet (16 m) below, amounting to a total of some 15 stories from the highest ceiling grid to the lowest floor level. The opening width and depth of the performance area are each 120 feet (37 m). This enormous performance space is reconfigured with each scene change by the complex movements of the show's lifts and platforms.

The largest moveable platform employed in the show, the sand cliff deck, measures 25×50×6 feet (7.6×15.2×1.8 m) and weighs 50 tons. A vertical gantry crane supports and controls the deck, lifting the platform up and down 72 feet (22 m), rotating it 360 degrees and tilting it from flat to 100 degrees. This is attached to four 75-foot-long (23 m) hydraulic cylinders that run along two support columns. The deck is equipped with show and work lights, circular elevators to bring performers in and out, 80 'rod actuators' that sprout from the floor surface to enable performers to climb it when it is tilted vertically, and video projection tiles that allow computer-generated images to appear on the floor of the deck. In one scene, the entire deck is covered with 350 cubic feet (9.9 m^{3}) of imported granular cork from Portugal which creates the realistic appearance of a beach.

The second largest platform, the tatami deck, is a cantilevered 30-by-30-foot (9.1 m × 9.1 m) platform located upstage of the sand cliff deck. It weighs 75,000 pounds (34,000 kg), and slides in and out like a drawer to provide a horizontal stage and carry massive set pieces such as the Wheel of Death.

These two decks can appear alone or together or simply disappear from view; they can move in front of, behind, above or below each other.

The theater and stage were designed by British architect Mark Fisher; the structural design and engineering of the stage platforms was by the New York City engineering firm McLaren Engineering Group. The torsion tube, wrist, and arm assembly for the sand cliff deck were built by Timberland Equipment, a company that normally builds mining equipment.

In 2008, the unique floating stages earned Kà the prestigious Thea Award for Outstanding Technical Achievement from the Themed Entertainment Association.

=== Effects ===
Kà combines complex automation, pyrotechnics, puppetry, and multimedia projections that help immerse the audience in the story.

=== Sound and video ===
Designed by sound designer Jonathan Deans, the 1,950-seat Kà Theatre contains 4,774 loudspeaker drivers in 2,139 cabinets, including two headrest speakers in every seat alongside overhead and perimeter arrays . The digital audio matrix routes music and effects across 16 independent seating zones to create an immersive surround-sound environment .

The multimedia projection in the show utilizes both infrared video motion detecting as well as a system of touch-sensitive panels beneath the surface of the main sand cliff deck. This allows the system to track the location of individual performers and change the video content accordingly. A similar example of the infrared portion of this technology can be seen in some movie theater lobbies where people can step on and burst video projected bubbles.

=== Safety ===
Kà takes safety very seriously in the form of technical implementations as well as training. Such areas include power sources, fire precautions, falling, harness equipment, and other such items among many others. As an example, many performers wear earpieces during the show in order to hear cues when they can perform various stunts safely.

Due to the speed in which artists fall from the decks, an array of airbags had to be used in lieu of traditional nets alone. These airbags sit atop two nets, which at times are 70 feet (21 m) below the point the artist begins the fall. The airbags contain individual cells which can inflate and deflate independently. In case a power outage occurs, each airbag has its own uninterruptible power supply which can last up to 30 minutes.

The sand cliff deck has pegs built into it which are used during the Climb scene. Each peg has a sensor which will not allow it to shoot out from the deck if something is blocking its path. These pegs shoot out at a speed of 19 feet per second (5.8 m/s), simulating arrows striking the surface. Likewise, each peg can only retract with less than 20 pounds (9.1 kg) of pressure. Thus if someone were hanging off of it, the peg would stay in place. If something were to go wrong with the deck, a set of backup pegs are in place which can be utilized as a safety ladder to allow performers to exit the deck safely.

As for the aerial rigging system which allows performers to perform tricks in the air while harnessed, it too has safety features. If a harness or wire were to fail, a fail-safe mechanism is in place which would lower the performer to the stage or in the aisles to safely detach from the cabling system.

As the Kà theatre is inside the MGM Grand, it too is integrated into the building's fire suppression system. During the show, stage managers must contact hotel security and ask that the fire officer override the fire detection equipment in the theatre during the duration of any pyrotechnic and fire stunts.

==== Accidents and incidents ====
On June 29, 2013, cast member Sarah "Sasoun" Guyard-Guillot, an acrobat from Paris, France, died after she fell about 94 feet (29 m) from the show's stage at MGM Grand. She was taken to the University Medical Center of Southern Nevada where she died. It was the first reported death from an accident onstage in Cirque du Soleil's 30-year history. It was the second time in less than a week that a Cirque show on the Las Vegas Strip was halted for an accident involving one of its artists; a performer in one of the final preview performances of Michael Jackson: One at Mandalay Bay suffered a mild concussion after slipping through the slack rope in the show's “Stranger in Moscow” scene, missing the protective pad below the act and landing hard upon the stage. Two artists in Zumanity at the New York-New York Hotel and Casino were seriously injured in an onstage fall in November 2007.

== Cast ==
A team of over 300 people make up the production team for Kà, ranging from technicians to support staff. Eighty people from this team comprise the on-stage artists and performers.

- Archers and Spearmen: A malevolent underground society built on war and domination by violence. They mine a rare element that can be processed into powerful explosives for weapons.
- The Chief Archer: The imposing general of the Archers' forces; he directs the archers and spearmen during their strategic attacks.
- The Chief Archer's daughter: This femme fatale is desired by all the men of the Archer tribe but spurns their affections. As she falls in love with the Twin Brother, she finds her loyalty divided.
- The Evil Counselor: Leader and strategist of the Archer tribe.
- The Counselor's son: A brilliant designer of weapons and war machines; malignant, jealous and petty.
- The Court Jester: The Fool of the court shares a special bond with the Twins. He helps protect the Twin Brother.
- The Firefly Boy: The handsome leader of the Forest Tribe swings from the trees like Tarzan. He saves the Twin Sister from falling to her death.
- The Forest Tribe: They live harmoniously with nature in the forests, and they offer protection to the Twin Sister.
- The Mountain Tribe: They live isolated from the empire in the mountaintop. They help save the Twin Sister.
- The Twins: They are brother and sister and are heirs to the throne. As children of the imperial court, they are educated, noble, and trained in combat.
- The Nursemaid: She is charged with watching over the Twins in their young age.
- The Valets: Bumbling servants of the Imperial Court who constantly get into trouble. They help protect the Twins.
- The Empire: A noble and peaceful society which represents the pinnacle of civilization in the world of KÀ.
- The Emperor: Monarch of the Empire; father of the Twins.
- The Empress: Co-ruler with the Emperor; mother of the Twins. Her elaborate dress references the traditional costumes of Peking opera.
- The Imperial Guards: Martial artists and protectors of the Emperor's Court; they are dressed in Asian-inspired robes.
- The Animals: Brought to life by larger-than-life puppets, the animals of Kà include a pair of crabs, a starfish, a turtle, a giant grasshopper, a snake, and a caterpillar.

== Choreography ==
The choreography incorporates several types of acrobatics and martial arts, including fight scenes using modern wushu taolu, Chinese opera, Poi for manipulating staves and batons, Brazilian Capoeira dance, bungees, aerial straps, swing poles, and a wheel of death.

== Acts ==
Kà is a story about "conflict and love", of "imperial twins who are separated at the prime of their youth and must undergo a rite of passage of self-discovery. It is about their encounters with Kà, the fire that has the dual power to destroy or illuminate."

Unlike other Cirque du Soleil performances, Kà offers four pre-shows. Once the house opens, guests are greeted by the villagers of Kà (better known as the “Gatekeepers"). Twenty minutes before curtain, two musicians enter the lobby and climb up to two stringed instruments specially designed for Kà and integrated into the architecture. Ten minutes before the show, actors appear in the metal framework to the left and right of the stage and perform flips and leaps assisted with ropes to dive into the audience and attempt to scare viewers. Five minutes before showtime, a staged act informs the audience that there is no flash photography or cell phone usage allowed.

The story is told in a total of fourteen scenes, each of which is preceded by movement of one or more of the massive stage elements.

- The Pageant: Kà begins with the stage set as a ship. The twins are returning home, and preparations are in motion for their arrival. The boat docks and the entire royal family is united. The court celebrates the return of the twins by displaying fantastic feats in a pageant, while the twins each perform together on their flutes. The Counselor and her son interrupt the celebration with a proposition of the alliance—the king angrily refuses, and the two intruders retreat. Just as the celebration comes to a close, pandemonium erupts when the court is attacked by a group of archers. The twins watch in horror as their parents, The Emperor and Empress, are assassinated in front of their eyes.
- The Storm: As the palace burns to the ground, the surviving members flee for their lives. Accompanied by their nursemaid, Twin Sister and Twin Brother attempt to escape to a boat that will take them to safety. However, the Twin Brother is left behind, shot down by an arrow. The Court Jester jumps off the boat to save the Twin Brother from his impending doom. The boat escapes, only to sink in a terrible storm.
- The Deep: As a soft piano and cello duet plays, the Nursemaid nearly drowns in the water. The Twin Sister dives into the depths to rescue her and quickly swims to the surface with the Nursemaid in tow.
- Archer's Den: As light returns, the stage is now the Archer's Den. The Chief Archer, the Evil Counselor, and their men celebrate the destruction of the Imperial Palace. The Counselor's Son unveils a model of the Death Machine that he designed to "grind bones with the magical ore to unleash the destructive power of fire" and use it to kill and destroy all that stand in the Archers' path to conquer the Empire.
- Wash-up on Shore: The Twin Sister, her Nursemaid, and the two Valets are reunited on a golden sandy beach. As they explore, they encounter giant sea creatures, including a crab, a turtle, a centipede, and a starfish. The group then leaves to search for other survivors.
- Lantern (Shadows): In the meantime, the Court Jester and the Twin Brother have taken refuge in a cave. The Jester gently tries to nurse the Twin Brother's wounds. To distract him from his pain and fear, the Jester teaches the Twin Brother the art of shadow puppets. This beautiful moment is spoiled by the archers, who, watching at a distance, plot their capture of the two. The Jester hears a sound and investigates, leaving Twin Brother alone. The Twin Brother turns and sees the face of the Chief Archer's Daughter. Their eyes meet but are interrupted as the Archers leap out and capture him. The Chief Archer's Daughter watches helplessly as the Twin Brother is carried away.
- The Climb: Meanwhile, the Twin Sister and her entourage are scaling a mountain when they are also attacked by the Archers. The Archers do not capture them, but the group becomes separated.
- Blizzard: The Twin Sister and the Nursemaid are reunited through the assistance of a friendly mountain tribe, but the Archers also manage to find the clan.
- Archers Attack: Under the threat of being captured by the Archers, the mountain tribe saves the Twin Sister by revealing their escape device — a simple tent dwelling that transforms into a miraculous human-powered flying machine. The group escapes but the Twin Sister falls from the machine, plunging into a deep, lush forest.
- Flutes (Captivity): The stage returns to the Archer's Den, where the Twin Brother is imprisoned in a small cage. The Chief Archer's Daughter watches from a distance, holding the flutes that the twins played before their lives were changed forever. All seems lost for the Twin Brother until he finds a friend in the kind-natured Chief Archer's Daughter, who dares to approach him. She passes the flutes to the Twin Brother, he begins to play and when she leans towards the cage for a closer look at him, he leans forward to steal a brief kiss. Although the Chief Archer's Daughter is taken aback, as she turns away from the Twin Brother it is obvious that she has also become smitten by him. After their tender moment and after great hesitation, the Chief Archer's Daughter sets the Twin Brother free from his cage, begging him to flee. Before he does, the Twin Brother makes a decision — he returns to her his flutes, the precious ceremonial gifts that were treasured by their kingdom. The Twin Brother then escapes, leaving the Chief Archer's Daughter in hope they will meet again. She cannot hide her joy — she expresses her love through a touching performance of dance using the twins' flutes. All of this is secretly witnessed by the Counselor's Son, who has desired the Chief Archer's Daughter for years. Engulfed by rage and jealousy of his unrequited love, he prepares for war.
- The Forest: The stage lights up again revealing the lush forest into which the Twin Sister has fallen. The magical forest is home to many creatures, including enormous insects and an 80-foot (24 m) long snake. As the Twin Sister falls, a dashing creature comes to her rescue. It is the Firefly Boy, who lives within the forest. He swoops down and rescues her, before inviting her to dance within the trees with him. Perched high above in the vines is one of the singers, singing a sweet and exotic melody for their acrobatic dance. Knowing that she must continue her search for her brother, the Twin Sister reluctantly leaves.
- Slave Cage: Back at the Archers' Den, the Death Machine has been completed and the enslaved former citizens of the Empire (including the captured Nursemaid and Valets) toil away in the mines. The Evil Counselor and his son now sense that they have enough support and admiration amongst the Archers’, forcing them to usurp the Chief Archer and assuming command of the Archers' forces. The fiendish Death Machine (Wheel of Death) is powered by slaves running in hamster-wheel cages on both ends of a long rotating pendulum arm. We recognize the two slaves in the Wheel of Death as former members of the Imperial Court. While operating the machine, the slaves escape out of the cage and brazenly taunt their captors by performing elaborate and dangerous stunts on the moving Death Machine. The enslaved Empire is inspired by the courage of the two slaves and while the Archers are distracted by the events, the Empire rises up and revolts against its captors. The bravery of the two slaves in the Wheel of Death begins to turn the tide in the war. In the conclusion, the Chief Archer's daughter is able to rescue her father from captivity and the Twins are finally reunited.
- Final Battle: An army, led by the Evil Counselor and his son, is preparing to crush the remains of the empire once and for all. With the aid of the Firefly Boy and the people of the forest, the Twins lead a counterattack and are victorious. In the Aftermath, we hear the cries of sorrow from the Counselor. He rushes to the side of his son, who apparently lies dying in the center of the battlefield. The stage slowly disappears into darkness.
- Aftermath: The stage lights up for a final time, revealing the same boat the twins used to return to the land. Triumphant after the battle, peace and harmony has been restored to all of the empire. The twins now rule the empire, and each has married their beloved met on their journey. The Chief Archer has vowed peace and symbolizes this by breaking his bow over his knee. The Counselor and his son also return. Although not dead, The Counselor's Son has been blinded by the battle. To show they have realized the error of their ways, they make a magnificent display through fireworks. Kà ends the way it started; in celebration.

=== Act changes ===
- Pillars: Performers leapt over pillars whilst displaying their martial arts and acrobatic skills. The pillars were around 22 inches (56 cm) in diameter and 15 feet (4.6 m) tall. It was taken out of the show after director Robert Lepage felt that it didn't fit into the show well and also the act was quite dangerous and caused many injuries to the artists.
- The Wash up on shore sequence has frequently changed over the years, from having two crabs instead of one, and having the original three valets wash up on shore instead of already being with the characters.
- There were originally three valets before being cut down to two.
- Following the stage death of acrobatic performer Sarah Guillot-Guyard, after Kà resumed performances, Kà was presented without the "Battle Scene" act. This act was then replaced with a transition artistic scene, "The Dressing-Ritual", which was originally a rotational act that debuted in 2004, and also maintained both the storyline of production and its 90-minute running time. In November 2014, the Battle Scene started being presented during certain performances of Kà, and later returned on December 12, 2014.

== Costumes ==
Asian visual iconography was the inspiration for many of the costumes in Kà: this can be seen in the imperial court and martial artists' wardrobes. The Twins, for instance, have very lavish silk costumes which draw inspiration from orientalist painters from Japan, Korea, and India.

Cirque du Soleil utilized a new type of digital screen printing in order to design many costumes for Kà, examples of which can be seen in the Forest People, Archers, and the Counselor's Son. The Forest People's costumes rely on printing the performers' body definitions onto the actual fabric to enhance the appearance of making their skin actually look like it is truly blue and green. Inspiration was drawn from the African Maasai warriors' ritual scar markings. As for the Archers, skin-toned Tactel was selected and tattoo designs were printed on it to make the Archers' tattoos look truly realistic. They also have moulded rubber toes attached to their shoes, giving the appearance that they are barefoot. Tattooing techniques used for the Archers were also applied to the Counselor's Son. In addition, a ripped piece of kilt is superimposed on his costume; this was made by using "shibori" (a Japanese tye-dyeing technique).

The crab puppets seen in the beach scene each took approximately 1,300 hours to create.

== Music ==
Kà features an off-stage band that accompanies the acting, acrobatics, and singing that takes place on stage. During various portions of the show, different musicians make appearances in the show, performing in costume directly on the stage. The vocals in Kà are provided by a mezzo-soprano (played by Rochelle Collins) and an alto (played by Lizzy Munson).

Originally, Kà's score was to be composed by Benoit Jutras. However, he left the show because of creative differences, and the music of Kà was composed by René Dupéré, who has composed music for multiple other Cirque productions, including Mystère at Treasure Island, and Cirque's touring production of Alegría.

The soundtrack for Kà was released on the 18th of October, 2005. In addition to the original score, the soundtrack features several 'inspired by' tracks. Although the album is somewhat remixed, most of the content remains faithful to the show.

The original album artwork of Kà, 2005.

Co-produced, arranged and engineered by Martin Lord-Ferguson, the Kà soundtrack features a symphonic orchestra of 57 musicians conducted by Hollywood veteran Simon Leclerc and a choir of over 50 singers conducted by Jean-Sebastien Allaire, making Kà Cirque du Soleil's most "ambitious recording to date." The album features the voices of Élise Velle (René Dupéré's wife), Ella Louise Allaire (vocalist, arranger and vocal coach) and a young soprano boy named Philippe Lapan-Vandal. In addition, the 'inspired by' tracks, with the exception of "If I Could Reach Your Heart" (performed by Élise Velle), feature the voice of Canadian world artist Nitza Melas.

Through the music of Kà, René Dupéré attempts to provoke various emotions and moods such as drama, emergency, serenity, passion, and even "the birth of love". Dupéré describes the music with an "African flavor" and states that he wants the audience to feel that the show is "full of energy". He says that the music is not intended to sound as though it belongs to a specific time frame. "It could be from medieval times or even 200 years in the future...the music itself is ageless."

The tracks on the Kà soundtrack, followed by the scenes to accompany the songs are listed below.

1. O Makundé (Foreword / Aftermath)
2. Pageant (The Pageant / Finale)
3. Koudamare (Blizzard)
4. Storm (The Storm)
5. Deep (The Deep)
6. Shadowplay (Lantern (Shadows))
7. Pursuit (Climb)
8. Forest (The Forest (Second part of the scene) / Pole jumping (Second part of the act, 2004–2007))
9. Flight (Flight)
10. Threat (Pillars (2004–2007) / Twin's Abduction (2007–present))
11. Love Dance (Captivity)
12. Battlefield (Final Battle (2004–2013, 2014–present))
13. Aftermath (Aftermath)
14. If I Could Reach Your Heart (adapted from "O Makundé")
15. We've Been Waiting So Long (adapted from "Shadowplay")
16. Reach For Me Now (adapted from "Deep")

Songs in the show that are not on the soundtrack album:

- The Music Box (Opening)
- Archer's Den
- Wash-up on Shore
- Firefly Boy (Aerial straps (2007–present))
- The Forest (First part of the scene) / Pole jumping (First part of the act, 2004–2007)
- Slave Cage
- The Dressing Ritual (2004–present)

== Comic book adaptation ==
Cirque du Soleil and Marvel Entertainment teamed up to adapt Kà through a limited four-part series of collectible comic books. Created by comic book writer Bryan J.L. Glass, artist Wellinton Alves and colorist Jean-Francois Beaulieu, these comics follow the heroic journey of the Imperial Twins, separated by war, who encounter adventure and peril at every turn on their quest to reunite their kingdom. The first installment debuted at the Marvel booth at the 2012 San Diego Comic-Con on July 12 – 15, then a wide release followed into comic book stores and a digital download version with subsequent issues to come.

== In popular culture ==
- Footage of Kà was featured in the premiere of the seventh season of CSI: Crime Scene Investigation, "Built To Kill, Part 1"; one of the cases in that episode included a death of a woman who was crushed by one of the moving stages while trespassing.
- Kà was a part of the 2007 NBA All-Star Game half-time show.
- Kà was also featured in an episode of Really Big Things on the Discovery Channel.
- Repair of the sand cliff deck from Kà was documented in an episode of World's Toughest Fixes on the National Geographic Channel.
- The Kà theater was used as the set for episode 14 of the 2007 season of MTV's Road Rules series.
- The performers from Kà participated in part 1 of the first-season finale of Top Chef on Bravo.
- Kà - Backstage was a 90 minute long documentary made exclusively for French Language TV channel, Arte and the German TV Station, ZDF. It aired on ZDF December 28, 2007.
- German national TV channel ZDF later aired a backstage documentary named Kà Backstage in parallel to the show Kà, allowing the viewers to switch between the channels with the same timeline. This documentary included never seen before behind-the-scenes night vision shots of the crew preparing the next sets while the show was running.
- "Battlefield" was featured as the percussion break in Phantom Regiment's 2008 DCI World Champion field show "Spartacus."
- On July 21, 2010, Kà performed on America's Got Talent (season 5, episode 16).
- On June 27, 2011, at a San Diego Padres Game, 10 members of Kà participated in elements of the game including the first pitch, national anthem, and warm-up during the 7th-inning stretch. They also performed traditional Chinese and Brazilian martial arts during a pregame performance.
- On July 21, 2011, artists from Kà performed for San Diego Comic-Con. The performance took place on a vertical stage created by the use of an outside façade of Petco Park.
- On October 3, 2016 Marilu Henner and Derek Hough danced the Paso Doble to the song “Battlefield” as part of Cirque Du Soleil night on Dancing With The Stars
