= Death of Sarah Guyard-Guillot =

French acrobat (1981–2013)

Sarah Guyard-Guillot
- Born: September 12, 1981; Paris, France
- Died: June 29, 2013 (aged 31); Las Vegas, Nevada, United States
- Cause of death: Blunt force trauma

Sarah "Sasoun" Guyard-Guillot (French pronunciation: [sa.ʁa sa.sun ɡi.jaʁ.ɡi.jo]; September 12, 1981 – June 29, 2013) was a French acrobat and aerialist who fell to her death during a performance of the Cirque du Soleil show Kà at MGM Grand in Las Vegas, Nevada, on June 29, 2013.

== Background ==
Kà is a Cirque du Soleil show that plays at the MGM Grand in Las Vegas, Nevada. According to the Los Angeles Times, the show "may well be the most lavish production in the history of Western theater [and] is surely the most technologically advanced." It features a 360 degree rotating stage and 86 cast members. The stage does not have a permanent floor; it has several moving platforms that appear to float.

Guyard-Guillot's fall was the second accident to halt a performance in less than a week. On June 26, 2013, a cast member suffered a minor concussion after slipping from a slack rope during a preview performance of Michael Jackson: One at Mandalay Bay. Previously, two cast members were seriously injured during a 2007 performance of Zumanity at the New York-New York Hotel and Casino. In 2009, an acrobat died during a trampoline training accident.

== Life ==
Sarah Guyard-Guillot was born in Paris, France, and began her circus career in childhood. She graduated from the Annie Fratellini Art & Circus Academy. She worked as an acrobat and aerialist for 22 years. In 2006, Guyard-Guillot joined the cast of Kà as it opened at the MGM Grand. She ran a circus school class for children in Las Vegas called Cirquefit. She was formerly married to Mathieu Guyard, another Kà performer. At the time of her death, Guyard-Guillot's son and daughter were 5 and 8, respectively.

== Death ==
During the final battle scene of Kà, the stage is oriented vertically and performers use harnesses attached to cables to move about with a catwalk above them. During this scene at the 9:30 pm show on June 29, 2013, Guyard-Guillot was hoisted up the side of the stage to a height of at least 94 feet (29 m) (some eyewitnesses said it may have been over 100 feet (30 m)). According to an eyewitness, she "then just plummeted down." Her harness apparently slipped free from its safety wire, causing her to fall into a pit, out of the audience's view. A spokesperson confirmed that the harness itself remained on Guyard-Guillot during her fall. "Initially, a lot of people in the audience thought it was part of the choreographed fight," said an eyewitness. "But you could hear screaming, then groaning, and we could hear a female artist crying from the stage." After her fall, the show was quickly stopped and a recording asked the audience to leave and said refunds would be offered. The other performers watched helplessly as they dangled in the air, before being lowered to safety, one by one.

Guyard-Guillot died in the ambulance on the way to the hospital. She was pronounced dead at 11:43 pm. Guyard-Guillot's death was the first on-stage accident resulting in death in Cirque du Soleil's 30-year history. She was 31 at the time of her death.

On July 2, 2013, the Clark County Coroner's Office said Guyard-Guillot fell around 90 feet (27 m), which is almost twice the distance reported initially. She died of blunt force trauma.

== Reaction ==
An official statement by Cirque du Soleil read, "The entire Cirque du Soleil family is deeply saddened by the accidental death of Sarah (Sasoun) Guyard ... Our thoughts are with her family and the entire Cirque du Soleil family." Company founder Guy Laliberté said he was "heartbroken", and remarked, "We are all completely devastated with this news ... [Guyard-Guillot] has been an integral part of our Cirque du Soleil tight family. We are reminded, with great humility and respect, how extraordinary our artists are each and every night." A memorial website was quickly flooded with condolences.

Performances of Kà were put on hold indefinitely. On July 14, 2013, it was announced that performances of the show (in a modified form) would resume on July 16, 2013, and that a full schedule would be resumed on July 23, 2013. The first performance was dedicated to Guyard-Guillot, who was described as "an exceptional artist".

== Investigation ==
A formal investigation into Guyard-Guillot's death was launched by Nevada OSHA. John Fudenberg of the Clark County Coroner’s office, who worked with OSHA on the investigation, said, "There is certainly safety apparatus that is used during any Cirque du Soleil show, and I know that company is very safety-conscious. We have to make sure we inspect the safety harnesses ... Our priority is to find out how this happened." The investigation was expected to take up to six months.

On October 29, 2013, Nevada OSHA initially issued six citations totaling $25,000 in fines and penalties for Cirque du Soleil Nevada, and three citations totaling $7,000 for the MGM Grand. In November 2013, all but one of the violations issued against Cirque du Soleil in the incident were withdrawn by agency investigators. According to the remaining OSHA violation and a press conference from Cirque du Soleil, Guyard-Guillot hit the catwalk above her when ascending. This sent a force up the cable causing her wire rope to be jarred out of a pulley and then severed by the edge of the pulley, leading her to fall.
