= Teeterboard =

Acrobatic apparatus

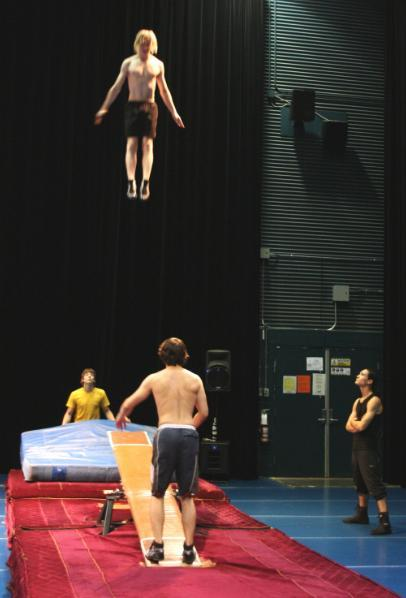
Corteo performers practising on the teeterboard

The teeterboard or Korean plank is an acrobatic apparatus that resembles a playground seesaw. The strongest teeterboards are made of oak (usually 9 feet in length). The board is divided in the middle by a fulcrum made of welded steel. At each end of the board is a square padded area, where a performer stands on an incline before being catapulted into the air. The well-trained flyer performs various aerial somersaults, landing on padded mats, a human pyramid, a specialized landing chair, stilts, or even a Russian bar.

The teeterboard is operated by a team of flyers, catchers, spotters and pushers. Some members of the team perform more than one acrobatic role. In the early 1960s the finest teeterboard acts, trained in the Eastern Bloc countries, performed with Ringling Brothers and Barnum & Bailey Circus.

Korean-style teeterboard called Neolttwigi is a form of teeterboard where two performers jump vertically in place, landing back on the apparatus instead of dismounting onto a landing mat or human pyramid. Korean plank acts are featured in the Cirque du Soleil shows La Magie Continue, Le Cirque Réinventé, Nouvelle Experience, Mystère, Dralion, Corteo, Koozå, Amaluna, Drawn to Life, and Echo.

Flying Fruit Fly Circus, based in Albury NSW Australia, uses custom teeterboards (handmade in-house) in numerous national and international shows.

The Hungarian board (bascule hongroise) has a higher fulcrum, and the pushers jump from a height (e.g., from a tower).

References:

- Technical Note 6-7: Teeterboard
- FEDEC Manual on Teeterboard
- A kinematic analysis of jumping technique in elite Korean teeterboard athletes: a case-study DOI:10.1080/14763141.2021.2018030
- The Influence of the Board Bending and Recoil Effect on Circus Performance in Korean Teeterboard DOI:10.4028/p-7QwXVo
- Effect of jump heights, landing techniques, and participants on vertical ground reaction force and loading rate during landing on three different Korean teeterboards DOI:10.1177/17543371211058031
