= Bazzar (Cirque du Soleil) =

Touring show by Cirque du Soleil

- Company: Cirque du Soleil
- Genre: Contemporary circus
- Show type: Touring show
- Date of premiere: November 14, 2018 (Mumbai, India)
- Final show: January 6, 2025 (Meloneras, Gran Canaria)

Other information
- Preceded by: Crystal (2017)
- Succeeded by: Alegria: In a New Light (2019)
- Official website

Bazzar was a touring show by Cirque du Soleil that premiered on 14 November 2018 in Mumbai, India. It is the company's 43rd production, and its first show to perform in India. From India, it moved to Riyadh in Saudi Arabia.

The show was designed to target the Indian and African market.

Destani Wolf was the lead vocalist for performances in India, United Arab Emirates, Oman, Lebanon, Egypt, Turkey and Saudi Arabia, and Dominican Republic.
