= Cirque du Soleil =

Canadian contemporary circus company

Cirque du Soleil Entertainment Group
- Type: Private
- Industry: Entertainment
- Founded: 16 June 1984; 42 years ago
- Founders: Guy Laliberté; Gilles Ste-Croix
- Headquarters: Montreal, Quebec, Canada
- Area served: Worldwide
- Key people: Mark Cornell (president and CEO)
- Revenue: ▲ C$850 million (FY 2018)
- Number of employees: 4000+
- Divisions: Cirque du Soleil Images; Cirque du Soleil Events + Experiences
- Subsidiaries: Outbox; Blue Man Group; VStar Entertainment Group; The Works Entertainment
- Website: cirquedusoleil.com

The Cirque du Soleil Entertainment Group, commonly known as Cirque du Soleil (French: [siʁk dy sɔ'lɛj], Canadian French: [sɪʁk d͡zy sɔ'lɛj]; French for 'Circus of the Sun'), is a Canadian entertainment company and the largest contemporary circus producer in the world. Headquartered in the inner-city area of Saint-Michel, Montreal, it was founded in Baie-Saint-Paul on 16 June 1984 by former street performers Guy Laliberté and Gilles Ste-Croix.

Originating as a performing troupe called Les Échassiers (IPA: [lez‿eʃas'je]; "The Stilt Walkers"), they toured Quebec in various forms between 1979 and 1983. Their initial financial hardship was relieved in 1983 by a government grant from the Canada Council for the Arts to perform as part of the 450th anniversary celebrations of Jacques Cartier's voyage to Canada. Their first official production Le Grand Tour du Cirque du Soleil was a success in 1984, and after securing a second year of funding, Laliberté hired Guy Caron from the National Circus School to recreate it as a "proper circus". Its theatrical, character-driven approach and the absence of performing animals helped define Cirque du Soleil as the contemporary circus ("nouveau cirque") that it remains today.

After financial successes and failures in the late 1980s, Nouvelle Expérience was created—with the direction of Franco Dragone—which not only made Cirque du Soleil profitable by 1990, but allowed it to create new shows. It expanded rapidly through the 1990s and 2000s, growing from one production to dozens of shows in over 300 cities on six continents. In 2017, the company employed 4,900 people from 50 countries and took in about US$1 billion. Several permanent Las Vegas shows alone play to more than 9,000 people a night, 5% of the city's visitors, adding to the over 100 million people who have seen Cirque du Soleil productions worldwide.

In 2000, Laliberté bought out Daniel Gauthier's stake in the company, and with 95% ownership continued to expand the brand. In 2008, Laliberté sold 20% of his share to the investment groups Istithmar World and Nakheel of Dubai, but bought back the stake after the 2008 financial crisis. In 2015, TPG Capital, Fosun Industrial Holdings, and Caisse de dépôt et placement du Québec purchased 90% of Cirque du Soleil while Laliberté retained a 10% stake in the company. In February 2020, Laliberté sold his remaining 10% stake in the company to Caisse de dépôt et placement du Québec for $75 million. The company declared bankruptcy amid the COVID-19 pandemic and was sold in November 2020 to a group of its creditors led by Catalyst Capital Group.

The company's creations have received numerous prizes and distinctions, including three Drama Desk Awards; seven Primetime Emmy Awards; multiple Gemini Awards; a Daytime Emmy Award; a Juno Award; and a star on the Hollywood Walk of Fame. In 2000, Cirque du Soleil was awarded the National Arts Centre Award, a companion award of the Governor General's Performing Arts Awards, and in 2002 was inducted into Canada's Walk of Fame.

== History ==
=== 1979–1983: Origins ===
In 1979, after having quit college and learned the art of fire breathing, Guy Laliberté organized a summer fair in Baie-Saint-Paul with the help of Daniel Gauthier and Gilles Ste-Croix. As part of a publicity stunt to convince the Quebec government to help fund this production, Ste-Croix walked the 56 miles (90 km) from Baie-Saint-Paul to Quebec City on stilts. This gave them funding for the stilt-walking troupe Les Échassiers de Baie-Saint-Paul, which then toured Quebec the following year in 1980.

Although well received by audiences and critics alike, Les Échassiers was a financial failure. Laliberté spent the following winter in Hawaii while Ste-Croix stayed in Quebec to set up a nonprofit holding company named "The High-Heeled Club" (Club des Talons Hauts) to mitigate the losses of the previous summer. This allowed Les Échassiers de Baie-Saint-Paul to break even by fall 1981. The following summer, Laliberté and Ste-Croix founded La Fête Foraine, a street performance festival that featured circus performances and workshops to teach the circus arts to the public. Laliberté managed and produced the fair for 2 more years, becoming a moderate financial success.

In 1983, the government of Quebec gave him a $1.6 million grant to host a production the following year as part of Quebec's 450th anniversary celebration of the French explorer Jacques Cartier's arrival in Turtle Island (North America). This became Cirque du Soleil's first production Le Grand Tour du Cirque du Soleil.

=== 1984–1989: Foundation and early productions ===
The company's first production Le Grand Tour performed in Quebec for 13 weeks in summer 1984. Although several issues persisted during the first tour (including a collapsed tent and conflict between artists), it was a financial success. After securing funding from the Canadian government for a second year from the help of Quebec premier René Lévesque, Laliberté hired Guy Caron, head of the National Circus School, as Cirque du Soleil's artistic director. Laliberté and Caron reworked the company's performance style to emulate that of Moscow Circus by having the acts tell a story. Further influences from the Circus of China, Cirque Arlette Gruss, and Circus Roncalli led Cirque du Soleil to approach their shows in a more theatrical fashion with live music and no technical crew on stage. To assist in this shift towards a theatrical production, Laliberté and Caron hired Belgian director Franco Dragone to direct segments of their 1985 production, Cirque du Soleil.

The company's first non-Quebec performances in Ontario in 1985 were unsuccessful, leading to a $750,000 deficit. To enable a 1986 tour, the Desjardins Group covered $200,000 of bad checks, financier Daniel Lamarre represented the company for free, and the Quebec government allotted it an additional year of funding. La Magie Continue, their 1986 production, proved more artistically successful with the direction of Franco Dragone. This extended to the creation of their 1987 show Le Cirque Réinventé.

In the summer of 1987, Cirque du Soleil was invited to present Le Cirque Réinventé at the Los Angeles Arts Festival. Despite only having enough money to make a one-way trip, the company agreed to open for the festival in September of that year. Le Cirque Réinventé's first American performances were an instant critical and financial hit, allowing them make a profit of over $1.5 million by the end of 1987. Over the next two years the show continued to tour Canada and the United States, making its first appearance at New York's Battery Park in March 1988. In 1989 plans for a second touring show named Éclipse started developing. Due to artistic differences with these plans, Guy Caron, along with a number of artists, left the company causing the plans to be shelved. Gilles Ste-Croix, who had been away from the company since 1985, subsequently replaced Caron as artistic director.

=== 1990–1999: Consistent successes and international expansion ===
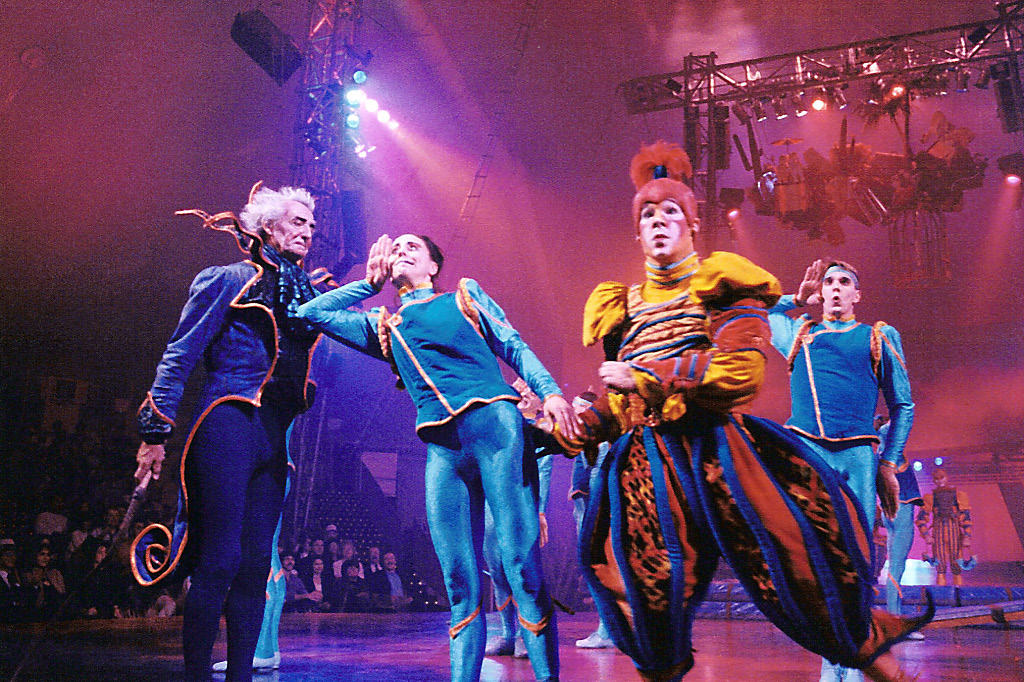
On stage at the 1993 finale of Nouvelle Expérience

By the end of 1989, the company once again faced deficit due to internal conflicts amongst the company's leaders as well as from lukewarm reception to their revamped tour of Le Cirque Réinventé in the United States. In response to this, Cirque du Soleil took their plans for their previously shelved show Éclipse and developed it into Nouvelle Expérience. Franco Dragone returned as director in addition to a creative team made up of costume designer Dominique Lemieux, set designer Michel Crête, lighting designer Luc Lafortune, choreographer Debra Brown, and composer René Dupéré. Nouvelle Expérience premiered in May 1990 to critical acclaim, touring North America through the end of 1991 and later taking up a one-year residency in Las Vegas until 1993. The following touring shows created by the same creative team—Saltimbanco, Alegría, and Quidam—proved to be equally successful.

The success of Nouvelle Expérience's contract in Las Vegas led to a deal between Cirque du Soleil and the Mirage Casino-Hotel to create a permanent show, Mystère, residing in Treasure Island Hotel and Casino on the Las Vegas Strip. It premiered in December 1993. Its success as the company's first permanent production would later allow for the creation of two more permanent shows in 1998: O in Las Vegas and La Nouba at Walt Disney World in Orlando, Florida. During this time of expansion, the company also founded their International Headquarters in Montreal's Saint-Michel neighbourhood and their multimedia division Cirque du Soleil Images, which produced their first film Alegría in 1999, also directed by Dragone.

Following the premiere of La Nouba, the creative team made up of Dragone, Lemieux, Crête, Lafortune, and Brown (as well as Benoît Jutras who took over as in-house composer after Dupéré in 1994) departed Cirque du Soleil. Starting with the creation of Dralion in 1999, the company began producing shows with entirely new creative teams.

==== First international ventures ====
Le Cirque Réinventé marked the company's first performances outside of North America when it performed in London and Paris in 1990. The show received a mixed reception and was not followed by another production until Saltimbanco's 1995 European tour, which better solidified Cirque du Soleil's presence in the European market.

Cirque du Soleil also toured Japan in the summer of 1992 at the behest of the Fuji Television Network. Combining acts from their previous shows Nouvelle Expérience and Le Cirque Réinventé, they created their first arena show Fascination which toured Japan from May to August of that year. Fascination's positive reception allowed Cirque du Soleil to play Saltimbanco there in 1994, thereby establishing the company's market in the Asia and Pacific region for their subsequent tours in the late 1990s and 2000s.

=== 2000–2009: Rapid growth ===
In 2000, the company produced their IMAX film Journey of Man. Shortly afterwards, at the beginning of 2001, Daniel Gauthier left the company and was bought out by Guy Laliberté, bringing his ownership stake in the company to 95%. Gilles Ste-Croix also soon left to found the horse-based touring show Cheval, leading Laliberté to hire Lyn Heward and Daniel Lamarre as Presidents and C.O.O.'s of the company's Creative Content and New Ventures divisions, respectively.

In 2002, the company created the touring show Varekai and in 2003 premiered the resident show Zumanity in Las Vegas, their first "X-rated" show performed only for adults aged 18 years and older. The company also produced their first television shows that year: the documentary reality miniseries Fire Within and the variety series Solstrom. In 2004, Cirque du Soleil premiered the resident show Kà at MGM Grand in Las Vegas, directed by Robert Lepage. In September of that year, the company launched their record label, Cirque du Soleil Musique, after their agreement with BMG Canada expired.

In 2005, Lamarre took over as President of Cirque du Soleil from Laliberté while Heward took on the role of executive producer for special projects. In that same year the company premiered the touring show Corteo. The same year, the Cirque du Soleil switched ticketing companies to go with Outbox's technology, a white label system, of which it also became a shareholder.

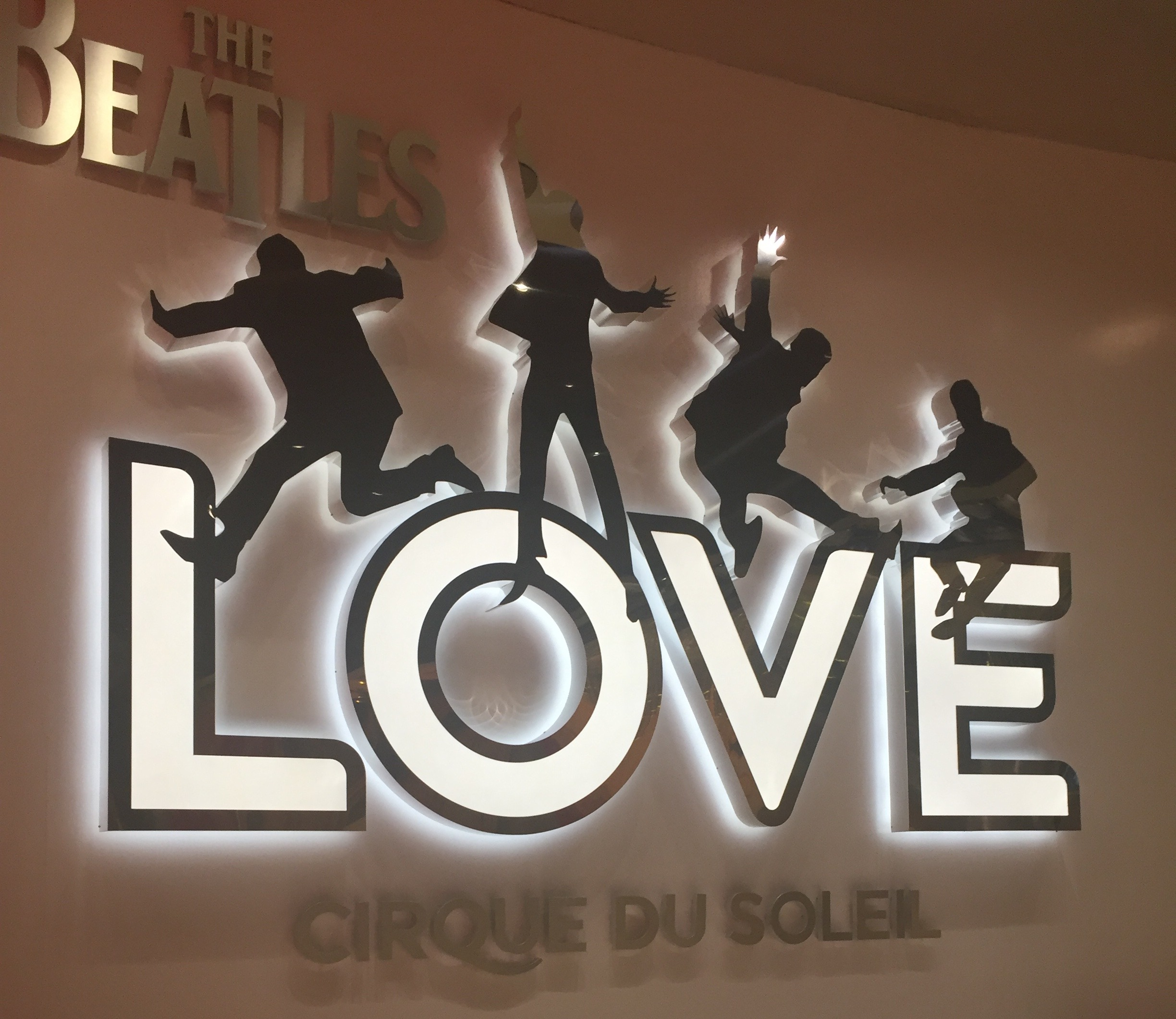
Beatles Love sign at the Mirage Hotel

Cirque du Soleil premiered two shows in 2006: Delirium, their first significant touring arena show, in January of that year and The Beatles Love, their first collaboration with The Beatles, in June. Similarly, in 2007 they opened two more productions with the resident show Wintuk in New York City and the touring tent show Koozå. In July 2007 the company made their first effort to convert tent shows to arena settings by launching Saltimbanco's arena tour in London, Ontario (this custom would be followed by other tent shows in later years).

The company opened three resident shows within the span of 3 months in 2008—Zaia in Macau, China, Criss Angel Believe in Las Vegas, and Zed in Tokyo, Japan—which furthered their practice of producing multiple shows at the same time. That year Cirque du Soleil also announced that they sold a 20% stake in the company to Dubai investors Istithmar World and Nakheel in order to finance their goals, including plans for a resident show in Dubai directed by Guy Caron and Michael Curry (according to Laliberté, these plans were later "put on ice" due to the Great Recession).

In 2009, they launched 3 more shows: the touring tent show Ovo, the touring theatre show Banana Shpeel, and the resident show Viva Elvis in Las Vegas. At this time Cirque du Soleil began being criticized for the quality of their productions. Banana Shpeel became labelled as one of the company's first "failures" when it was panned by both critics and audiences; Criss Angel Believe and Viva Elvis also received negative reviews.

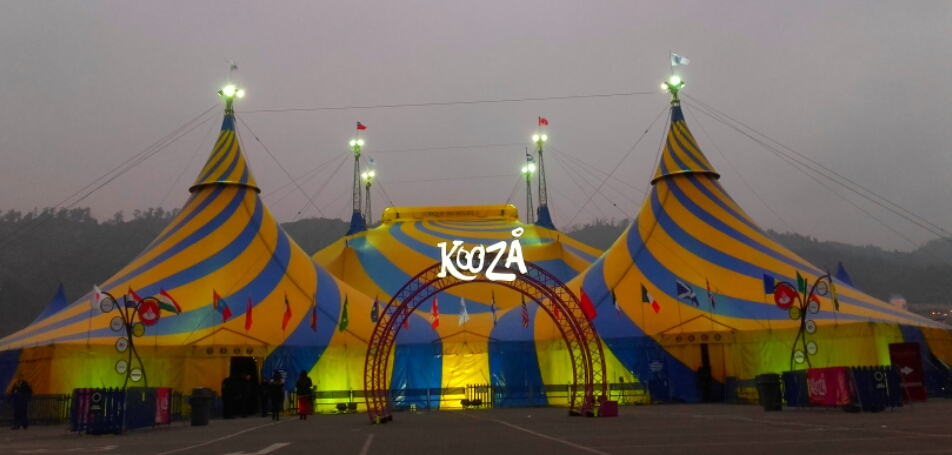
Koozå's grand chapiteau in Santiago, Chile

=== 2010–2014: Cutbacks and restructuring ===
The touring show Totem premiered in 2010 and was soon followed by three more shows in 2011: the resident show Iris in Los Angeles and the touring shows Michael Jackson: The Immortal World Tour and Zarkana. Although the company was still growing at this time, it continued to face several issues with its newer productions. Zarkana and Michael Jackson: The Immortal World Tour received poor reviews and the company had a string of closures. Banana Shpeel closed in Toronto in October 2010 after cancelling its previously-announced engagement in San Francisco. In July 2011, Cirque du Soleil announced the closure of Zed due to poor ticket sales as a direct result of the March 2011 Tōhoku earthquake and tsunami. In November 2011 MGM Grand asked the company to close and replace Viva Elvis by the end of 2012 due to poor ticket sales. In February 2012, the company announced the closure of Zaia due to disappointing ticket sales and in November 2012, despite critical praise, announced the closure of Iris, also due to low ticket sales. In December 2012, the company announced a new division—Cirque du Soleil Média—in conjunction with Bell Media, followed by the release of their second film Worlds Away. At this time Cirque du Soleil also announced 50 layoffs. The layoffs consisted mostly of 30 employee positions at their International Headquarters in Montreal, including three vice-presidents.

With the high output of shows between 2007 and 2011 in combination with its multiple closures, the company began slowing down its operations. In 2012 and 2013 it only opened two shows: the touring tent show Amaluna and the resident show Michael Jackson: One in Las Vegas. On 16 January 2013, Cirque du Soleil announced that it would be laying off 400 of its 5000 employees worldwide, most of which at their International Headquarters. The company noted that it had not been profitable in 2012 despite having garnered over $1 billion in revenue that year. Later that year, on 30 June 2013, the company faced headlines when acrobat Sarah "Sasoun" Guyard-Guillot died after falling during a performance of Kà in Las Vegas, its first on-stage death in its history.

In January 2014, Cirque du Soleil announced the creation of Cirque du Soleil Theatrical, a division aimed developing more traditional theatre productions in order to diversify their production output. In April 2014, Kurios: Cabinet of Curiosities, a touring tent show, premiered in Montreal to critical acclaim and was followed in November 2014 by Joyà, both the company's first resident show in Mexico and their first dinner theatre production.

=== 2015–2020: Rebranding and diversification under TPG Capital, Fosun, and CDPQ ===
On 20 April 2015, Guy Laliberté announced that he had sold a 90% joint stake in the company to the investment groups TPG Capital, Fosun Capital Group, and La Caisse de dépôt et placement du Québec (CDPQ) for approximately $1.5 billion, while retaining a 10% stake in the company himself. The sale received regulatory approval from the Government of Canada on 30 June 2015. Under the new ownership, the company began majorly restructuring its executive leadership in order to focus on increasing their profitability. Their finance director, chief operating officer, and numerous vice-presidents were all replaced within six months of the company's sale. Notably, the position of Chief Operating Officer held by Charles Décarie was given to finance lawyer Jonathan Tétrault.

In November 2015 the company premiered the touring arena show Toruk – The First Flight based on James Cameron's Avatar franchise. It was followed shortly after by the touring tent show Luzia and the company's first Broadway musical Paramour, both opening in April 2016. By the end of 2016 the company had also launched the preschool television series Luna Petunia on Netflix. In 2017, it launched three more productions. Séptimo Día - No Descansaré, an arena show based on the music of Soda Stereo, premiered in March for a short year-long tour targeted largely at South and Central American audiences. In April 2017, it premiered the touring tent show Volta and in October, Crystal, the company's first ice show.

Cirque du Soleil launched the children's show Big Top Academy through TVO in October 2018. In November 2018, it premiered the touring tent show Bazzar in India, the company's first production to tour in that region. In 2019, the company opened six shows: the touring tent show Alegría: In a New Light; the touring arena shows Axel and Messi10; the touring theatre show 'Twas the Night Before; and two resident shows—X: The Land of Fantasy in Hangzhou, China and R.U.N in Las Vegas.

Under the ownership of TPG Capital, Fosun Capital Group, and La Caisse de dépôt et placement du Québec, Cirque du Soleil restructured into a new parent company named Cirque du Soleil Entertainment Group and secured several multi-million dollar acquisitions: the Blue Man Group, VStar Entertainment Group, and The Works Entertainment Group. In February 2020, Caisse de dépôt et placement du Québec acquired Guy Laliberté's remaining 10% stake in Cirque du Soleil, bringing its total ownership in the company from 10% to 20%.

=== 2020–2021: Impact of the COVID-19 pandemic ===
On 19 March 2020, responding to the COVID-19 pandemic, Cirque du Soleil announced that all 44 active shows worldwide would be suspended, and that 4,679 employees, comprising 95 percent of their staff, would be temporarily laid off, effective immediately. These actions brought the company into a state of financial collapse with a debt of over $1 billion. Although it received financial support with a $50 million injection from its shareholders and a $200 million loan from the Quebec government, on 29 June 2020 the company announced that it had filed for bankruptcy protection and was terminating 3,500 employees who had previously been laid off. CEO Daniel Lamarre stated the intention of the company was to rehire "a substantial majority" of terminated employees once coronavirus-related shutdowns were lifted and operations could resume, business conditions allowing.

In connection with the filing, Cirque du Soleil entered a stalking horse bid from its shareholders with the intention of drawing outside bidders to buy the company. In July 2020, the company's shareholders offered a proposal that would allow its creditors to obtain a 45% stake in the company while the current shareholders would maintain a 55% shared stake. On 17 July 2020, a takeover proposal by the company's creditors valued at US$1.2 billion was approved as a benchmark bid in the company by the Quebec Superior Court. On 17 August 2020, Caisse de dépôt et placement du Québec reported that it had to write off the US$75 million investment which it had made only four months prior, in February. On 24 November 2020, it was announced that the company emerged from bankruptcy and was sold to a group of its creditors led by Canadian investment company Catalyst Capital Group.

=== 2021–present: Post-pandemic restructuring under Catalyst ===
With the exception of the resident shows Joyà and X: The Land of Fantasy, which reopened with limited capacities in the summer of 2020, Cirque du Soleil did not reopen its shows for over a year during its worldwide COVID-19 performance suspension. They began gradually reopening its shows in the summer of 2021, beginning with its Las Vegas-based resident shows. Several productions that had been temporarily suspended due to the pandemic (including Zumanity, Totem, Volta, and Axel) did not reopen and were retroactively permanently closed by the company.

In 2021, the resident show Drawn to Life premiered—the company's first new production since the onset of the pandemic. In 2022, Mad Apple opened in the former Zumanity theatre at New York-New York Hotel and Casino in Las Vegas, followed by the touring show Echo in 2023. In 2024, the touring theatre production Songblazers premiered, but was shut down after four months due to "logistical reasons". In 2025, the resident shows Alizé and Ludõ premiered in Berlin and Nuevo Vallarta, Mexico, respectively.

==== Changes in leadership and employment structure ====
In November 2021, Cirque du Soleil announced that Daniel Lamarre would be stepping down as president and CEO of the company and transitioning into the role of executive vice-chairman of the board, while former chief financial officer and chief operating officer Stéphane Lefebvre would take over as president and CEO, effective 1 December 2021. In April 2025, Stéphane Lefebvre stepped down from his position as president and CEO and was temporarily replaced again by Lamarre until Mark Cornell was appointed president and CEO in November 2025.

Numerous cutbacks occurred during this period under a consolidation policy the company titled "ONE Cirque", which included over 100 layoffs, the closure of two Blue Man Group performance venues, and the shuttering of their Las Vegas costume and fabrication workshops, all between November 2024 and February 2025. In February 2025, chief revenue officer Mike Newquist departed the company less than one month after beginning in the position.

== Shows ==
Each Cirque du Soleil production is a synthesis of circus styles from around the world, with its own central theme and storyline. Shows employ continuous live music, with performers rather than stagehands changing the props.

The duration of each touring show is typically between 2 and 2 hours and 30 minutes, including an intermission. Permanent shows are usually between 70 and 90 minutes in length without an intermission. Typically touring shows as well as resident shows perform a standard 10 shows a week. Touring shows usually have one "dark day" (with no performances) while resident shows have two.

=== Show list ===
Name	Premiere	Venue	Format	Status
Le Grand Tour du Cirque du Soleil	16 June 1984	Tour	Grand Chapiteau (1984); Arena (1984) (Note: Cirque du Soleil's tent collapsed under heavy rainwater buildup prior to their first show in Gaspé in 1984. After using a borrowed tent for their first performances, they performed in arenas for the next two tour stops before they were able to set up their repaired tent for the rest of the show's tour.)	Retired
Cirque du Soleil	14 May 1985	Tour	Grand Chapiteau (1985)	Retired
La Magie Continue	1 May 1986	Tour	Grand Chapiteau (1986)	Retired
Le Cirque Réinventé	7 May 1987	Tour	Grand Chapiteau (1987–1990); Theatre (1990) (Note: Le Cirque Réinventé's run in Paris in 1990 was housed in a "theatre in the form of a big top at Cirque d'Hiver Bouglione in the 11th arrondissement [...] owned by the Bouglione family".)	Retired
Nouvelle Expérience	8 May 1990	Tour	Grand Chapiteau (1990–1993)	Retired
Saltimbanco	23 April 1992	Tour	Grand Chapiteau (1992–2006); Arena (1994, 2007–2012) (Note: Saltimbanco performed in the CPR Angus Shops for its 1994 tour stop in Montreal.)	Retired
Fascination	22 May 1992	Tour	Arena (1992)	Retired
Mystère	25 December 1993	Treasure Island, Las Vegas	Resident (since 1993)	Active
Alegría	21 April 1994	Tour	Grand Chapiteau (1994–1999, 2001–2009); Resident (1999–2000); Arena (2009–2013)	Retired
Quidam	23 April 1996	Tour	Grand Chapiteau (1996–2010, 2015); Arena (2009, 2010–2016)	Retired
O	15 October 1998	Bellagio, Las Vegas	Resident (since 1998)	Active
La Nouba	23 December 1998	Disney Springs, Lake Buena Vista, Florida	Resident (1998–2017)	Retired
Dralion	22 April 1999	Tour	Grand Chapiteau (1999–2010); Arena (2010–2015)	Retired
Varekai	24 April 2002	Tour	Grand Chapiteau (2002–2013, 2017); Arena (2013–2017)	Retired
Zumanity	14 August 2003	New York-New York, Las Vegas	Resident (2003–2020)	Retired
Kà	26 November 2004	MGM Grand, Las Vegas	Resident (since 2004)	Active
Corteo	21 April 2005	Tour	Grand Chapiteau (2005–2015); Arena (2018–2025)	Retired
Delirium	26 January 2006	Tour	Arena (2006–2008)	Retired
The Beatles Love	2 June 2006	The Mirage, Las Vegas	Resident (2006–2024)	Retired
Koozå	19 April 2007	Tour	Grand Chapiteau (since 2007)	Active
Wintuk	1 November 2007	Madison Square Garden, New York City	Seasonal Resident (2007–2011)	Retired
Zaia	26 July 2008	The Venetian Macao, Cotai Strip, Macau	Resident (2008–2012)	Retired
Zed	15 August 2008	Tokyo Disney Resort, Tokyo, Japan	Resident (2008–2011)	Retired
Criss Angel Believe	26 September 2008	Luxor, Las Vegas	Resident (2008–2016)	Retired
Ovo	23 April 2009	Tour	Grand Chapiteau (2009–2015); Arena (since 2016)	Active
Banana Shpeel	19 November 2009	Tour	Theatre (2009–2010)	Retired
Viva Elvis	16 December 2009	Aria Resort and Casino, Las Vegas	Resident (2009–2012)	Retired
Totem	22 April 2010	Tour	Grand Chapiteau (2010–2020); Arena (2017)	Retired
Zarkana	9 June 2011	Aria Resort and Casino, Las Vegas	Theatre (2011–2012); Resident (2012–2016)	Retired
Iris	21 July 2011	Dolby Theatre, Los Angeles	Resident (2011–2013)	Retired
Michael Jackson: The Immortal World Tour	2 October 2011	Tour	Arena (2011–2014)	Retired
Amaluna	19 April 2012	Tour	Grand Chapiteau (2012–2020)	Retired
Michael Jackson: One	23 May 2013	Mandalay Bay Resort and Casino, Las Vegas	Resident (since 2013)	Active
Kurios: Cabinet of Curiosities	24 April 2014	Tour	Grand Chapiteau (since 2014)	Active
Joyà	8 November 2014	Vidanta, Riviera Maya, Mexico	Resident (since 2014)	Active
Toruk – The First Flight	12 November 2015	Tour	Arena (2015–2019)	Retired
Paramour	16 April 2016	New York City and Hamburg, Germany (Note: Paramour previously ran on Broadway in 2016 and 2017. It reopened in Hamburg in 2019.)	Theatre (2016–2020)	Retired
Luzia	21 April 2016	Tour	Grand Chapiteau (since 2016)	Active
Séptimo Día - No Descansaré	9 March 2017	Tour	Arena (2017–2018)	Retired
Volta	20 April 2017	Tour	Grand Chapiteau (2017–2020)	Retired
Crystal	5 October 2017	Tour	Arena (2017–2025)	Retired
Bazzar	14 November 2018	Tour	Grand Chapiteau (2018–2025)	Retired
Alegría: In a New Light	18 April 2019	Tour	Grand Chapiteau (since 2019)	Active
X (The Land of Fantasy)	3 August 2019	Hangzhou, China	Resident (2019–2025) (Note: Following a temporary closure brought on by the COVID-19 pandemic, Cirque du Soleil sold X (The Land of Fantasy) to the Hangzhou Suntiandy Group Company. The production operated independently of Cirque du Soleil until it permanently closed in 2025.)	Retired
Axel	4 October 2019	Tour	Arena (2019–2020)	Retired
Messi 10	10 October 2019	Tour	Arena (2019–2024)	Retired
R.U.N	24 October 2019	Luxor, Las Vegas	Resident (2019–2020)	Retired
'Twas The Night Before...	29 November 2019	Tour	Seasonal Theatre (since 2019)	Active
Drawn to Life	18 November 2021	Disney Springs, Lake Buena Vista, Florida	Resident (since 2021)	Active
Mad Apple	12 May 2022	New York-New York, Las Vegas	Resident (2022–2026)	Retired
Echo	20 April 2023	Tour	Grand Chapiteau (since 2023)	Active
Songblazers	2 July 2024	Tour	Theatre (2024)	Retired
ʻAuana	5 December 2024	Outrigger Waikiki Beachcomber Hotel, Honolulu, Hawaii	Resident (since 2024)	Active
Alizé	24 October 2025	Theater am Potsdamer Platz, Berlin, Germany	Resident (since 2025)	Active
Ludõ	4 December 2025	Vidanta, Nuevo Vallarta, Mexico	Resident (since 2025)	Active
L'Éveil d'Utopia	22 April 2027	Tour	Grand Chapiteau	Upcoming

=== Future productions ===
- L'Éveil d'Utopia: a Grand Chapiteau show premiering in Montréal on 22 April 2027, written and directed by Michel Laprise.

== Divisions, affiliates, and subsidiaries ==
Cirque du Soleil oversees multiple divisions, affiliates, and subsidiary companies which it has created or acquired over the course of its history. These have included in-house multimedia divisions such as Cirque du Soleil Musique, Cirque du Soleil Média, and Cirque du Soleil Images, as well as existing entertainment companies such as VStar Entertainment Group or The Works Entertainment Group.

=== Cirque du Soleil Events + Experiences ===
From the 1992 until 2015, Cirque du Soleil produced a variety of public and private events and performances under its Special Events division. In April 2015, the Special Events division was restructured as a formal subsidiary company named 45 Degrees. 45 Degrees later merged with the company's C-Lab (creative laboratory) division, expanding its purview to include development of "new concept" shows for the company's main division (for example, the dinner-show concept found in Joyà). In April 2019, the 45 Degrees subsidiary was restructured and rebranded as "Cirque du Soleil Events + Experiences", under which the company now develops its special events and projects.

Notable special events
Date	Name or event(s)	Location	Notes
20 March–29 November 1992	Knie Presents Cirque du Soleil	Switzerland	A collaboration with Circus Knie directed by Guy Caron that toured for nine months through 60 cities in Switzerland. The production followed the plot of Le Cirque Réinventé, using several of the show's acrobatic acts while also employing Circus Knie's animal acts—one of the few times the company used animals in performance.
June 1995	21st G7 Summit	Halifax	The company performed at the request of then Canadian Prime Minister Jean Chrétien for the dignitaries of the June 1995 G7 Summit in Halifax, Nova Scotia.
12 June 1997 – 28 May 2000	Pomp Duck and Circumstance	Germany	Directed by Gilles Ste-Croix, Cirque du Soleil revamped the German dinner-theatre show Pomp Duck and Circumstance and toured it in Germany from 1997 to 2000.
24 March 2002	74th Academy Awards	Los Angeles	A performance for the special effects category at the 74th Academy Awards. The five-minute performance featured 11 acts from a variety of the company's shows at that time.
11 July 2004	Soleil de Minuit	Montreal	A collaborative performance between Cirque du Soleil and the Montreal International Jazz Festival to celebrate the 20th and 25th anniversaries of each respective organization, directed by Michel Lemieux and Victor Pilon. The performance was televised live on CBC and later released on DVD.
16 July 2005	Reflections in Blue	Montreal	Cirque du Soleil created and performed the opening ceremony for the 2005 World Aquatics Championships in Montreal.
4 February 2007	One Day, One Game, One Dream	Miami Gardens, Florida	Cirque du Soleil created a performance inspired by Brazilian street theatre and the art of Romero Britto for the Super Bowl XLI pre-game show.
June–September 2008	El Despertar de la Serpiente	Zaragoza, Spain	El Despertar de la Serpiente (The Awakening of the Serpent) was a 65-minute moving parade production created for Expo 2008 in Zaragoza under the direction of Julien Gabriel.
17–19 October 2008	400th anniversary of Quebec City	Quebec City	Cirque du Soleil created a $3.3 million production involving 150 artists to commemorate the 400th anniversary of Quebec City in October 2008, running for a total of 5 performances.
16 May 2009	Enfant Prodigue	Moscow, Russia	Cirque de Soleil was the opening performance at the Final of the Eurovision Song Contest 2009.
24 June 2009 – 1 September 2013	Les Chemins invisibles	Quebec City	In 2009, Cirque du Soleil was given a $34.4 million, five-year contract by the city of Quebec to create free summer productions for tourists. The show, titled Les Chemins invisibles, premiered a different installment each year for five years between 2009 and 2013.
May–September 2010	Canada Pavilion	Shanghai	Cirque du Soleil co-created the Canada Pavilion in association with the Government of Canada for Expo 2010 in Shanghai. During its exhibition Cirque du Soleil performed and organized cultural programs for the pavilion.
26 February 2012	84th Academy Awards	Los Angeles	Over 50 artists performed a routine, scored by Danny Elfman, during the 84th Academy Awards in the Dolby Theatre.
13 July 2013 – 30 July 2017	Scalada series	Andorra	Cirque du Soleil created a series of summer productions for the principality of Andorra beginning in July 2013. The shows, respectfully titled Scalada in 2013, Mater Natura in 2014, Storia in 2015, Vision in 2016 and Stelar in 2017, performed each summer before concluding in July 2017.
13–28 December 2014	The 30th Anniversary Concert	Montreal	Cirque du Soleil's 30th Anniversary Concert was performed at the Saint-Jean-Baptiste Church in Montreal in December 2014. The 75-minute concert featured a 30-person orchestra, a 70-person choir, and 8 veteran Cirque du Soleil singers performing a variety of songs the company's previous shows.
13 May–30 August 2015	Allavita!	Milan	Allavita! was an hour-long show featuring 48 artists created for Expo 2015 in Milan. The €8 million production was performed in an open-air theatre built by Expo 2015.
10 July 2015	2015 Pan American Games opening ceremony	Toronto	Cirque du Soleil created the opening ceremony for the 2015 Pan American Games in Toronto. The 150-minute presentation featured 625 performers from 25 nationalities, including pianist Chilly Gonzalez and vocalist Véronic DiCaire.
15 July 2015–present	Série Hommage	Trois-Rivières, Quebec	An annual series of 75-minute summer shows paying tribute to Quebecois bands and musicians at the Amphithéâtre Cogeco in Trois-Rivières. Such tributes have included Beau Dommage, Robert Charlebois, Luc Plamondon, Les Colocs, and Les Cowboys Fringants.
2–10 January 2016	Joel	Moscow	Joel was a winter-inspired show directed by Fernand Rainville that performed in the 800-seat Barvikha Luxury Village concert hall in Barvikha, Moscow.
6 February 2016 – 23 December 2020	La Forge aux étoiles	Vienne, France	Cirque du Soleil created an aquatic evening show to replace the Lady O show at the French theme park Futuroscope. It performed 250 to 300 shows a year on an outdoor aquatic stage, utilizing laser projections, water fountains, pyrotechnics, and fire rather than acrobatics.
16 June–9 September 2017	Reflekt	Astana, Kazakhstan	This 75-minute production featuring 80 performers was created and performed 71 times for Expo 2017 in Astana, Kazakhstan, in the summer of 2017.
30 June 2018 – 31 July 2022	Andorra music series	Andorra	Following the Scalada series in Andorra, the Government of Andorra extended its contract with Cirque du Soleil with further summer productions paying tribute to various musical themes—Diva in 2018, Rebel in 2019 and Mūv in 2022.
14 August 2018 – 19 August 2019	Monte-Carlo and Bôcca	Monaco	Cirque du Soleil was hired by the Monte-Carlo Sporting Summer Festival in the summers of 2018 and 2019 to create 65-minute productions to run for 5 performances each. 2018's Monte-Carlo was based in 1920s Monegasque culture while 2019's Bôcca was largely a dinner-theatre event.
23 September 2018 – 24 September 2022	Saudi National Day	Saudi Arabia	An hour-long production in Riyadh featuring 80 artists created for the 2018 Saudi National Day. The company's decision to perform in Saudi Arabia for the first time was seen as a controversial one due to the August 2018 diplomatic dispute between Canada and Saudi Arabia. A second production was mounted in Dammam for five performances in September 2019 for the 2019 Saudi National Day. Following a hiatus due to the COVID-19 pandemic, a third production performed from 21 to 24 September 2022 in Riyadh.
27 November 2019 – 18 December 2022	Vitori, Fieri, and Amora	Valletta, Malta	In April 2019, Cirque du Soleil announced a three-year contract with the Malta Tourism Authority to create a series of 60-minute shows performed at the Mediterranean Conference Centre. The first show, Vitori, played in 2019. Following a hiatus due to the COVID-19 pandemic, the series returned with the shows Fieri and Amora in 2021 and 2022, respectively.
2 May 2022 – 26 May 2023	Best Of series	Jeddah, Saudi Arabia	A 90-minute production titled Fuzion performed as part of the 2022 Jeddah Season in May 2022 in Jeddah, Saudi Arabia. This was followed by Vizion in 2023.
1 July 2023–present	Andorra series	Andorra	Following the music-themed series in Andorra, the Government of Andorra continued its annual summer contract with Cirque du Soleil with Festa in 2023, Sublim in 2024, Il-Lu in 2025, and Ràdio Andorra.
9–31 May 2024	Spirit	Easter Elchies, Craigellachie, Moray, Scotland	A partnership performance with the Macallan distillery staged at the Macallan Estate to commemorate its 200th anniversary.
12 February–21 March 2027	Le Lo Lai	San Juan, Puerto Rico	A limited residency show at Coca-Cola Music Hall based on Puerto Rican culture.

=== Outbox ===
Outbox is a white-label electronic ticketing technology of which Cirque du Soleil is a primary shareholder, having partnered with the company shortly after its launch in 2005.

=== 4U2C ===
4U2C was an multimedia company that specialized in combining video, sound, lighting, and special effects for various projection surfaces. It was launched in 2013 as a joint venture between Cirque du Soleil and audiovisual company Solotech and later absorbed into the Cirque du Soleil Events + Experiences division in February 2020.

=== Blue Man Group ===
Performance art company Blue Man Group became a subsidiary under the Cirque du Soleil Entertainment Group parent company in July 2017. The cost for the acquisition was a reported US$65.5 million.

=== VStar Entertainment Group ===
Children's entertainment company VStar Entertainment Group was acquired by Cirque du Soleil Entertainment Group in July 2018. Its assets include Paw Patrol Live as well as one-time competitor Cirque Dreams, which itself is a subsidiary of VStar.

=== The Works Entertainment Group ===
Entertainment company The Works Entertainment Group, whose productions include The Illusionists, was acquired by Cirque du Soleil Entertainment Group in February 2019 for US$40 million.

== Other works and collaborations ==
=== Projects ===
- Cirque du Monde: A social action project founded in 1994 designed to reach marginalized youth nationally and internationally by teaching circus arts and skills.
- One Drop: In 2007, Cirque du Soleil founded One Drop, a charitable project designed to bring clean water to developing countries.
- Jukari Fit to Fly: Cirque du Soleil collaborated with Reebok in 2009 to create a gym workout set based on trapeze work.
- Safewalls: An artistic outreach project in which urban street artists were hired to create visual artworks for the company in 2011.
- Desigual inspired by Cirque du Soleil: Cirque du Soleil partnered with Desigual fashion design in 2011 to develop a collection of clothing and accessories, which were made available at Desigual stores and Cirque du Soleil show boutiques. The partnership was discontinued in 2015.
- Movi.Kanti.Revo: In association with Google, Cirque du Soleil released a Google Chrome extension in 2012.
- Felix & Paul Studios VR: Between 2014 and 2017, the Cirque du Soleil Média collaborated with Felix & Paul Studios to create a number of virtual reality videos based on Zarkana, Kurios, Kà, O, and Luzia. Inside the Box of Kurios later won a Daytime Emmy Award in 2016.
- Cirque du Soleil Theme Park: On 12 November 2014, Cirque du Soleil, Grupo Vidanta, and Goddard Group announced plans for a theme park in Nuevo Vallarta, Mexico. The plans called for at least two lands, the Village of the Sun and the Village of the Moon, as well as an outdoor evening show accommodating as many as 3,000 to 5,000 spectators, and may include a water park and nature park elements. The opening was initially delayed from 2018 to a mid-2019 opening. Further delays have subsequently pushed the projected opening date to 2023. The last press release about this project was submitted in 2021.
- One Night for One Drop: From 2013 to 2019, Cirque du Soleil organized an annual one-night event in support of the clean water charity One Drop.
- NFL Experience Times Square: A short-lived project with interactive displays about the National Football League.
- Criss Angel Mindfreak Live: Following the closure of Criss Angel Believe, Cirque du Soleil acted as a producing partner on Angel's subsequent production, Mindfreak Live, from 2016 to 2018.

=== Cruise ship performances ===
==== Collaboration with Celebrity Cruises ====
In March 2004, Celebrity Cruises announced its first collaboration with Cirque du Soleil. By the end of that year, the collaboration had launched "The Bar at the Edge of the Earth" on both the Constellation and Summit cruise ships, a bar and lounge inspired by Cirque du Soleil featuring live characters and projections. However, due to lukewarm reception, Celebrity Cruises announced in October 2005 that it would be removing the live characters and projections from the lounges and retooling its Cirque du Soleil offering so as to create a more standard circus performance. In December 2005, the collaboration premiered the 30-minute acrobatic show A Taste of Cirque du Soleil on both ships. It continued through 2006 and was eventually discontinued.

==== Cirque du Soleil at Sea ====
On 9 November 2015, Cirque du Soleil announced that it would be re-entering the cruise ship business in collaboration with MSC Cruises. The partnership plans included a $21 million investment by MSC to create special theatre spaces in four of their Meraviglia class ships while Cirque du Soleil would create eight new shows, two on each ship in alternating performances. The partnership was later branded as Cirque du Soleil at Sea.

In June 2017, it launched its first two productions on the MSC Meraviglia—Viaggio and Sonor. This was followed by Syma and Varélia on the MSC Bellissima in March 2019 and Cosmos and Exentricks on the MSC Grandiosa in November 2019. Two more shows were planned to launch on MSC Virtuosa in 2020 until the COVID-19 pandemic forced all Cirque du Soleil at Sea productions to close.

=== Lounges and nightclubs ===
Following the opening of The Beatles Love in Las Vegas in June 2006, Cirque du Soleil opened the Revolution lounge at The Mirage resort in 2007, its first venture into the Las Vegas nightlife business. The lounge was based on the work of The Beatles, in conjunction with the concept of The Beatles Love. In 2009, the company opened the Gold Lounge at the Aria Resort and Casino based on the life of Elvis Presley and their show Viva Elvis. In May 2013 the Light Group opened the Light nightclub in collaboration with Cirque du Soleil at the Mandalay Bay Hotel and Casino in concurrence with the premiere of Michael Jackson One. It would later be host to the musical For the Record, the company's first project out of its theatrical division.

In October 2015, Cirque du Soleil renounced its intention to be involved in Las Vegas nightclubs and has since dissociated itself from all its lounges and clubs. Both the Revolution and Gold Lounges closed in 2015 while the Light nightclub is no longer affiliated with the company.

=== Luna Petunia ===
In 2014 Cirque du Soleil Média and Saban Brands produced Luna Petunia, an animated series for preschool-aged children. It began airing on Netflix in September 2016. On 1 May 2018, Saban Brands sold Luna Petunia to Hasbro.

=== The Wiz ===
In a collaboration with Universal Television and Sony Pictures Television, the Cirque du Soleil Theatrical division co-produced the television broadcast of The Wiz Live! (based on the musical of the same name) which aired in December 2015 on NBC. Tony Award-winning director Kenny Leon directed the show along with Broadway writer/actor Harvey Fierstein, who contributed new material to the original Broadway script. Queen Latifah, Mary J. Blige, Stephanie Mills, Ne-Yo, David Alan Grier, Common, Elijah Kelley, Amber Riley, and Uzo Aduba and Shanice Williams starred in the broadcast. It was speculated that a live version of the show would play on Broadway during the 2016–2017 season, however this plan fell through.

== Tours ==
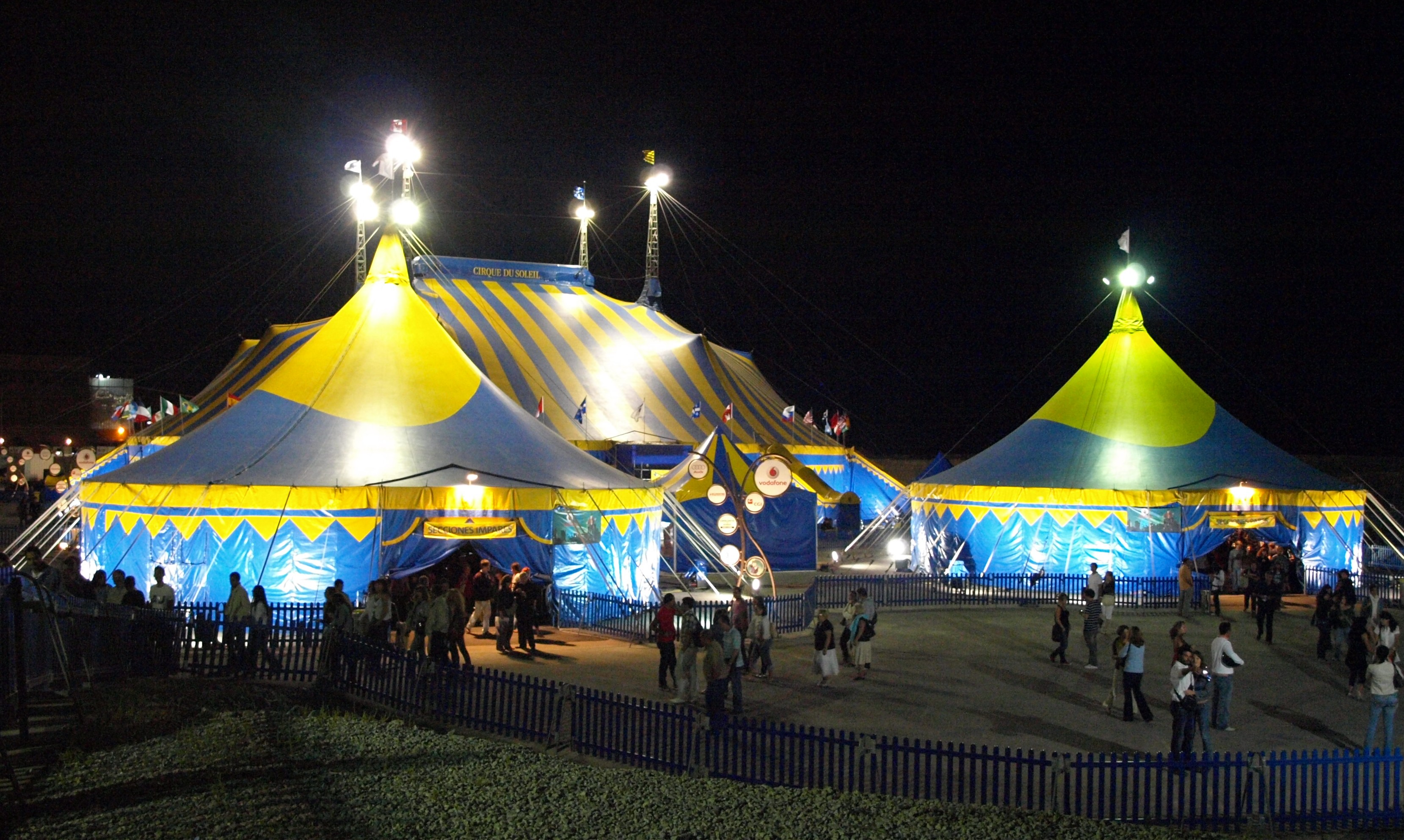
Night shot of Quidam's grand chapiteau in Barcelona, Spain

Touring Cirque du Soleil shows are customarily mounted under a grand chapiteau (i.e. big top) hauled from site to site along with a large entrance tent, artistic tent, kitchen, school, and other items necessary to support the cast and crew.

It typically takes eight days to set up and three to break down the site. About 100 local workers are hired as temporary staff, overseen by one of the company's tent masters.

Before 2006, Cirque du Soleil performed exclusively in tents and permanent theatres, with the exception of the brief arena tours of Le Grand Tour du Cirque du Soleil in 1984 and Fascination in 1992. 2006's Delirium was the company's first significant touring show for the arena market. Its success led Cirque du Soleil to re-stage its Grand Chapiteau shows for arena tours, beginning with Saltimbanco in 2007 and subsequently with most of their major Grand Chapiteau productions.

The company's tours contribute to venue cities' economies: renting lots for shows, parking spaces, selling and buying promotions, renting hotel rooms, purchasing food, and hiring local help. For example, during its 2009 stay in Santa Monica, California, Koozå brought an estimated US$16,700,000 (equivalent to $25,061,657 in 2025) to the city government and local businesses.

== Filmography ==
The company's multimedia division Cirque du Soleil Images creates original products for film, television, video, and DVD and distributes its productions worldwide. Its creations have garnered numerous awards, including a multiple Gemini Awards and seven Primetime Emmy Awards for Fire Within, Corteo, Dralion, Nouvelle Expérience, and Le Cirque Réinventé.

List of video releases
Year	Title	Notes
1985	Cirque du Soleil	A television adaptation of the production Cirque du Soleil, filmed live in Montréal in 1985. Only broadcast on television.
1988	La Magie Continue	A television adaptation of the production La Magie Continue. Filmed live in Toronto in 1986.
1989	Le Cirque Réinventé	A television adaptation of the production Le Cirque Réinventé. Filmed live in Montréal in 1988.
1991	Quel Cirque!	A promotional video about the touring production Nouvelle Expérience.
1992	Nouvelle Expérience	A film adaptation of the production Nouvelle Expérience. Filmed in live Toronto in 1991.
1992	Saltimbanco's Diary	A behind-the-scenes featurette on the making of Saltimbanco.
1992	Knie Presents Cirque du Soleil	A television adaptation of the company's collaboration with Circus Knie, filmed live in Switzerland in 1992.
1994	Saltimbanco	A television adaptation of the production Saltimbanco. Filmed live in Atlanta in 1993.
1994	A Baroque Odyssey	A 10th anniversary retrospective. Additional film shot in Montréal and Las Vegas.
1994	The Truth of Illusion	Documentary about the production Alegría. Filmed in Montréal in 1994. Out of print.
1996	Full Circle: The Making of Quidam	A behind-the-scenes look at the making of Quidam. Filmed in Montréal in 1996. Out of print.
1999	Quidam	A television adaptation of the production Quidam. Filmed live in Amsterdam in 1999.
1999	Alegría	A fictional story loosely inspired by the stage production Alegría, directed by Franco Dragone.
1999	In the Heart of Dralion	Behind the scenes of Dralion. Released along with the Dralion film adaptation DVD.
2000	Journey of Man	A compilation of acts from various Cirque du Soleil shows including Mystère and Quidam. This movie was shot in wide format and released at IMAX theatres.
2000	Inside La Nouba	Highlights of the show and interviews with creators. Out of print.
2001	Dralion	A television adaptation of the production Dralion. Filmed live in San Francisco in 2000.
2002	Alegría	A television adaptation of the production Alegría. Filmed live in Sydney in 2001.
2002	Fire Within	A 13-episode miniseries about the creation and production of Varekai broadcast on Global and Bravo in 2002 and 2003. It subsequently won two Gemini Awards and a Primetime Emmy Award.
2003	Varekai	A television adaptation of the touring show Varekai. Filmed live in Toronto in 2002.
2003	Solstrom	A 13-episode series using various acts from Cirque du Soleil and other productions, shown on Bravo. Each episode has a different theme. Filmed in Montréal in 2003.
2004	Midnight Sun	Filmed live at the Festival International de Jazz de Montréal on 11 July 2004, to celebrate the 25th anniversary of the Festival International de Jazz de Montréal and Cirque du Soleil's 20th anniversary.
2004	La Nouba	A television adaptation of the show La Nouba. Filmed live in Orlando in 2003.
2005	Kà Extreme	A documentary which explores the production of Kà by following the show's evolution from early rehearsals through to the first public performance.
2006	Corteo	A television adaptation of the touring show Corteo. Filmed live in Toronto in 2005.
2006	Lovesick	Filmed over two years and set in Las Vegas during the creation of the cabaret-style production Zumanity. Filmed in Las Vegas.
2007	Flow: A Tribute to the Artists of "O"	An homage to the artists of "O" that provides an in-depth documentary of the Las Vegas aquatic extravaganza. Filmed in Las Vegas in 2007.
2007	The Mystery of Mystère	A documentary about Mystère, the critically acclaimed theatrical production playing at the permanent location at the Treasure Island Resort. Filmed in Las Vegas in 2007.
2007	A Thrilling Ride through Kooza	A short documentary filmed during the creation period of Koozå. Filmed in Montréal in 2007.
2007	Kà - Backstage	Filmed exclusively for French-language TV channel Arte and the German national TV channel ZDF. The performance in its entirety was broadcast on the latter.
2008	Koozå	A television adaptation of the touring show Koozå. Filmed live in Toronto in 2007.
2008	Delirium	The last performance of Delirium was filmed in London. This film was released in limited theatrical runs on 20 August and 15 October 2008.
2008	All Together Now	A documentary about the making of The Beatles Love.
2010	Zed in Tokyo	A documentary filmed during the creation period of the Tokyo residency show Zed.
2010	Flowers in the Desert	A look at all the Vegas shows including Viva Elvis.
2011	Crossroads in Macao	A documentary filmed during the creation period of the Macao residency show, Zaia. Filmed in Macau and Montréal in 2010.
2012	Michael Jackson The Immortal World Tour Documentary	A documentary on the creation of the arena show Michael Jackson The Immortal World Tour. Filmed in Montréal in 2011.
2012	Cirque du Soleil: Worlds Away	Cirque du Soleil partnered with James Cameron and Andrew Adamson in association with Reel FX Entertainment to produce this 3D motion picture. Distributed worldwide by Paramount Pictures on 21 December 2012, the film tells the story of a girl named Mia going to a travelling circus and falling in love with its main attraction, the Aerialist. After the Aerialist falls during his act, he and Mia are transported to another world where each encounter the different worlds of Cirque du Soleil through O, Mystère, Kà, The Beatles Love, Zumanity, Viva Elvis, and Criss Angel Believe.
2013	Hatching	A documentary on the creation of the touring show Ovo.
2013	Amaluna	Film adaptation of the touring show Amaluna. Filmed live in Toronto in 2012.
2015	Le Grand Concert	A television adaptation of The 30th Anniversary Concert, produced by Echo Media exclusively for Canadian French-language TV channel Ici Radio-Canada Télé. Filmed live in Montréal on 23 December 2014.
2016	Toruk - The First Flight	Film adaption of the touring show Toruk - The First Flight inspired by James Cameron's film Avatar. Filmed live at the world premiere in Montréal in December 2015 and first released through the merchandising stands of various shows in July 2016.
2016	Luzia	Film adaptation of the touring show Luzia. Filmed live in Montréal in May 2016 and later released at the San Francisco premiere in November 2016.
2016	Luna Petunia	Canadian-American animated television series produced by Cirque du Soleil Media with Saban Capital Group and BrainPower Studio. The series premiered on Netflix on 9 December 2016. Four new seasons were launched during 2017 and 2018. On 1 May 2018, Saban Brands sold Luna Petunia to Hasbro.
2017	Kurios	A film adaptation of the touring show Kurios which was filmed in Miami in December 2016. It was released at the show's boutique shop in May 2017.
2017	O	A television adaptation of O for French-language TV channel Arte filmed live in Las Vegas in 2017 and first broadcast on 27 December 2017.
2018	Volta	A film adaptation of the touring show Volta, filmed live in Montréal in 2017 and released on Bell Fibe TV in 2018.
2022	Without a Net	A documentary about rebooting the show O after the production was shut down due to COVID-19.
2024	O	A film adaptation of O exclusively for the Cosm Los Angeles immersive movie theatre, filmed live in Las Vegas in 2024 and premiered 28 July 2024.
2025	Kurios - Interactive digital experience	Take control with an interactive digital experience that lets you explore the Seeker’s Cabinet of Curiosities, go backstage, and follow the performers.

== Controversies and legal issues ==
=== Firing of HIV-positive artist ===
In November 2003, gymnast Matthew Cusick (represented by the Lambda Legal Defense and Education Fund) filed a discrimination complaint against Cirque du Soleil in the Equal Employment Opportunity Commission, alleging a violation of the Americans With Disabilities Act. Cusick (a trainee performer who was scheduled to begin working at Mystère) alleged that in April 2002, Cirque du Soleil fired him because he tested HIV-positive, even though company doctors had already cleared him as healthy enough to perform. Cirque du Soleil alleged that due to the nature of Cusick's disease coupled with his job's high risk of injury, there was a significant risk of his infecting other performers, crew or audience members. Cirque du Soleil said that they had several HIV-positive employees, but in the case of Cusick, the risk of his spreading his infection while performing was too high to take the risk. A boycott ensued and Just Out ran a story on it with the headline "Flipping off the Cirque". Cirque du Soleil settled with Cusick in April 2004. Under the settlement, the company began a company-wide anti-discrimination training program; changed its employment practices pertaining to HIV-positive applicants; paid Cusick $60,000 in lost wages, $200,000 in front pay, and $300,000 in compensatory damages; and paid $40,000 in attorney fees to Lambda Legal.

An additional complaint was filed on Cusick's behalf by the San Francisco Human Rights Commission. Their complaint stemmed from the City of San Francisco's ban on city contracting with employers that discriminate based on HIV status; the circus leases property owned by the city-owned Port of San Francisco.

=== Trademark and copyright disputes ===
Cirque du Soleil opposed Neil Goldberg and his company Cirque Productions over its use of the word "Cirque" in the late 1990s. Goldberg's company was awarded a trademark on its name "Cirque Dreams" in 2005.

In August 1999, Fremonster Theatrical filed an application for the trademark Cirque de Flambé. This application was opposed by the owners of the Cirque du Soleil trademark in August 2002, on the grounds that it would cause confusion and "[dilute] the distinctive quality" of Cirque du Soleil's trademarks. A judge dismissed the opposition and the Cirque de Flambé trademark application was approved in 2005.

In April 2016, Cirque du Soleil filed a copyright infringement lawsuit against Justin Timberlake, Timbaland, and Sony Music Entertainment in federal court in New York, alleging that Timberlake's song "Don't Hold the Wall" (co-written with Timbaland) from his third studio album The 20/20 Experience (2013) infringed the copyright of Cirque du Soleil's song "Steel Dream" from its 1997 album Quidam. The two parties settled out of court.

=== H.B. 2 law in North Carolina ===
In 2016 the company cancelled all touring shows to North Carolina, including Ovo in both Greensboro and Charlotte, and Toruk in Raleigh, following signature of the Public Facilities Privacy & Security Act (commonly known as "HB2") by North Carolina governor Pat McCrory. Cirque du Soleil was criticized for this decision and accused of taking a double standard, for cancelling the shows in North Carolina while many times they have performed their shows in countries like the United Arab Emirates which violates a number of fundamental human rights.

== Fatalities ==
On 16 October 2009, 24-year-old performer Oleksandr "Sacha" Zhurov, of Ukraine, died at a hospital in Montreal, Quebec, Canada, from head injuries he had sustained during a training session. He had been with the company only a few months at the time of the accident. An initial report of the incident said Zhurov had fallen off a trampoline but, in 2010, it was reported he had fallen while doing training exercises on a Russian swing. An investigation by Quebec's occupational-safety board decided that while Zhurov made the error that ultimately resulted in his death, the company should be fined $1,915 for failing to adequately determine the risks associated with equipment.

On 29 June 2013, 31-year-old performer Sarah "Sasoun" Guyard-Guillot, of France, died in an ambulance en route to hospital as the result of blunt force trauma she had sustained from a fall during a performance of Kà in Las Vegas, Nevada. She had been with the company since 2006. It was originally thought that Guyard-Guillot's safety harness had failed her and that was what resulted in her fall but, in actuality, a cable responsible for keeping her in the air had been cut after accidentally being knocked loose by movement during the performance. Reports as to how far Guyard-Guillot fell differ from source to source, with some saying she fell 50 feet and others 94 feet. The show resumed 17 days after the death without the final aerial battle scene. The company was fined as a result.

On 29 November 2016, 42-year-old set technician Olivier Rochette, from Canada, died in San Francisco, California, from head injuries he had sustained after accidentally being hit in the head by an aerial lift while preparing for a production of Luzia. Rochette was the son of Cirque du Soleil co-founder Gilles Ste-Croix.

On 17 March 2018, 38-year-old aerial straps performer Yann Arnaud, of France, died at a hospital in Tampa, Florida, after falling during a performance of Volta. He had been with the company for 15 years.

== Notable people ==
- Criss Angel, magician and frequent collaborator
- Anthony Gatto, juggler
- Guy Laliberté, founder and former CEO
- Mathieu Laplante, producer, director, choreographer, and former circus performer
- Thom Wall, juggler and publisher of academic circus books
- Mason Ryan, former WWE wrestler and current Cirque du Soleil performer
