= R.U.N (Cirque du Soleil) =

- Company: Cirque du Soleil
- Genre: Contemporary circus
- Show type: Resident show
- Date of premiere: October 24, 2019 (Luxor Las Vegas, Las Vegas, Nevada)
- Final show: March 8, 2020

Creative team
- Creative Director: Stefan Miljevic
- Show Director: Michael Schwandt
- Writer: Robert Rodriguez
- Composer: Tyler Bates
- Set Designer: Bruce Rodgers
- Projection Designer: Olivier Goulet, Johnny Ranger
- Lighting Designer: David Finn
- Sound Designer: Jonathan Deans
- Acrobatic Equipment and Rigging Designer: Jaque Paquin
- Performance and Action Designer: Rob Bollinger
- Action Sequence Designer: Jean Frenette
- Costume Designer: Kym Barrett
- Choreographers: Ivan Velez, Preston Mui
- Make-Up Designer: Nathalie Gagne

Other information
- Preceded by: Messi 10 (Early October 2019)
- Succeeded by: 'Twas The Night Before... (November 2019)
- Official website

R.U.N was a resident live-action thriller Cirque du Soleil show that premiered on 24 October 2019 in Las Vegas, Nevada at the Luxor Las Vegas. The show was retired on March 8, 2020.

== Background ==
On April 30, 2019, Cirque du Soleil announced R.U.N at the Luxor Hotel and Casino, to premiere on October 24, 2019, as a replacement for Criss Angel Mindfreak Live! and Believe after a ten-year contract with the illusionist Criss Angel. Featuring movie-style stunts instead of acrobatic circus acts, R.U.N is directed by Michael Schwandt, with music by Tyler Bates, and a screenplay and opening narration by filmmaker Robert Rodriguez. Daniel Lamarre, President and CEO of Cirque du Soleil Entertainment Group, said, "R.U.N is very different from the other shows within the Cirque du Soleil portfolio. With R.U.N, we will ... draw inspiration from action movies and graphic novels".

R.U.N closed March 7, 2020, followed shortly thereafter by all Cirque shows on March 14, 2020, due to the COVID-19 pandemic.

== Characters ==
- Me: The Hero, Leader of the Street Kingz. (Originally played by Mark Poletti)
- The Groom: The rival of the "Me". Leader of the BlakJax. (Originally played by Florian Beaumont)
- The Bride: Where do her loyalties lie? (Originally played by Emilie Caillon)
- The Professional: A BlakJax Thief. Can he take down the hero? (Originally played by Samuel Ferlo)
- The Doctor: What will come of the hero in his torture chamber? (Originally played by Andrew Stanton and AuzzyBlood)
- Bone Breaker: As he is tortured, are his bones really breaking? (Originally played by Raye Yong)
- Camera Woman: Whether she is soaring through the air, or lurking behind the scenes, she captures every moment of our Hero's adventure. (Originally played by Joelle Zilberman)
- Street Kingz: The Hero's Gang. Can they reclaim Las Vegas' underworld as their own?
- BlakJax: The Groom's Gang. Fighting to avenge his honor.

== Scenes ==
A portion of the "Tag" scene in R.U.N

- Neon Wedding: Opening video introducing the characters and setting up the story
- Boom Brawl: A fight between the BlakJax and the Street Kingz, ending in the explosion of a Downtown Las Vegas fireworks factory.
- Bolt: Opening Credits, the hero is on the run on a massive treadmill.
- Lookout: The Professional attempts to take back what was stolen from the BlakJax.
- Tag: Flashback scene featuring stunt bikes exploring the history of the main characters
- Lessons in Pain: Freakshow artists attempt to get answers from the Hero, but end up losing.
- Rev: The Hero and The Bride attempt to escape as a car chase unfolds on stage, using projections, treadmills, and a full size car, traveling through the desert highways around Las Vegas.
- Into the Depths: The Hero and the Bride attempt to get to the surface after crashing into Lake Mead
- Level Up: Using BMX and Trials motorcycles, the Hero and the Groom's avatars battle for the right to take the heart.
- Til Death: Resisting the opening scene wedding, this time, with a twist.

== Gallery ==
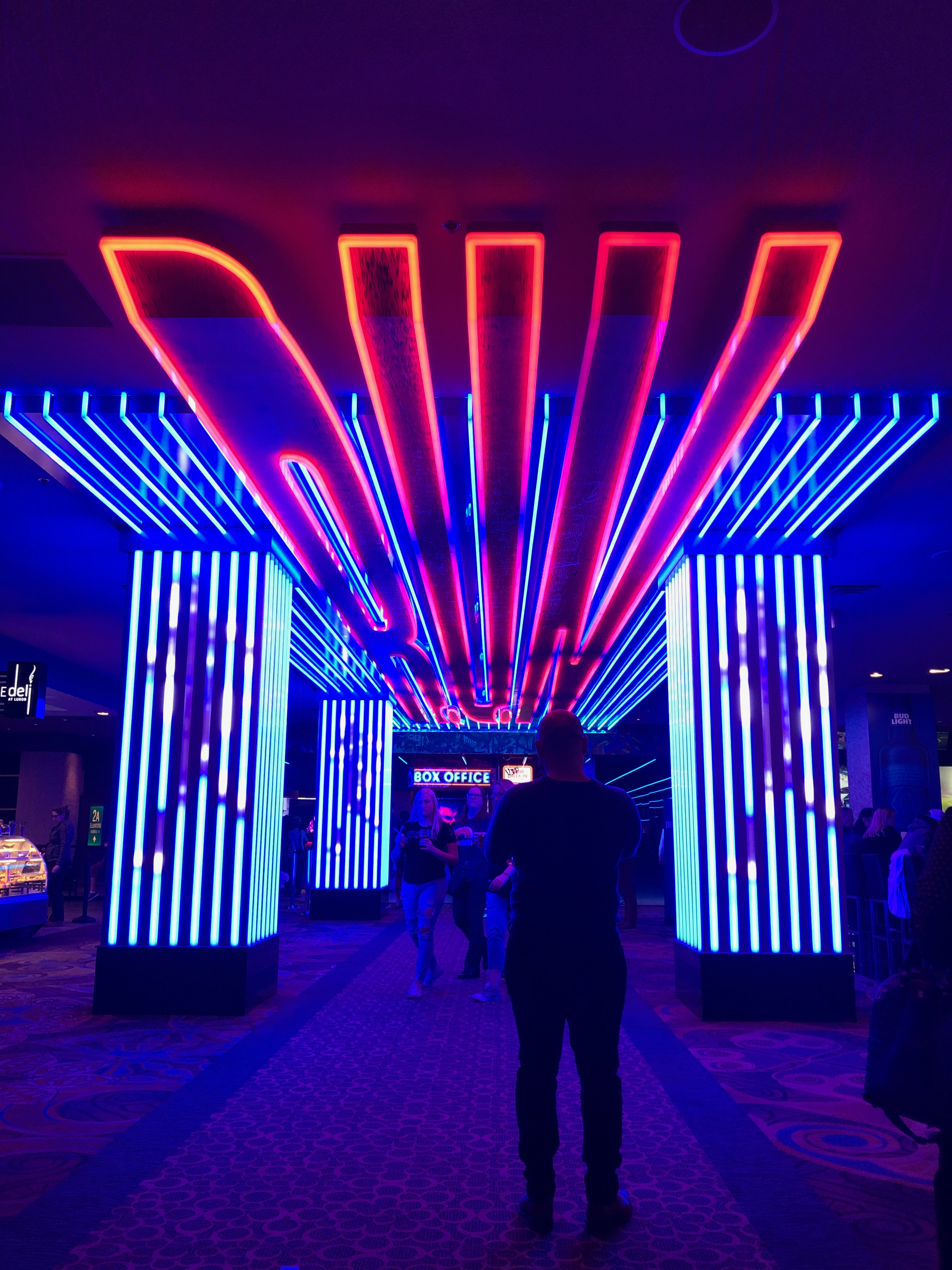
Show entrance

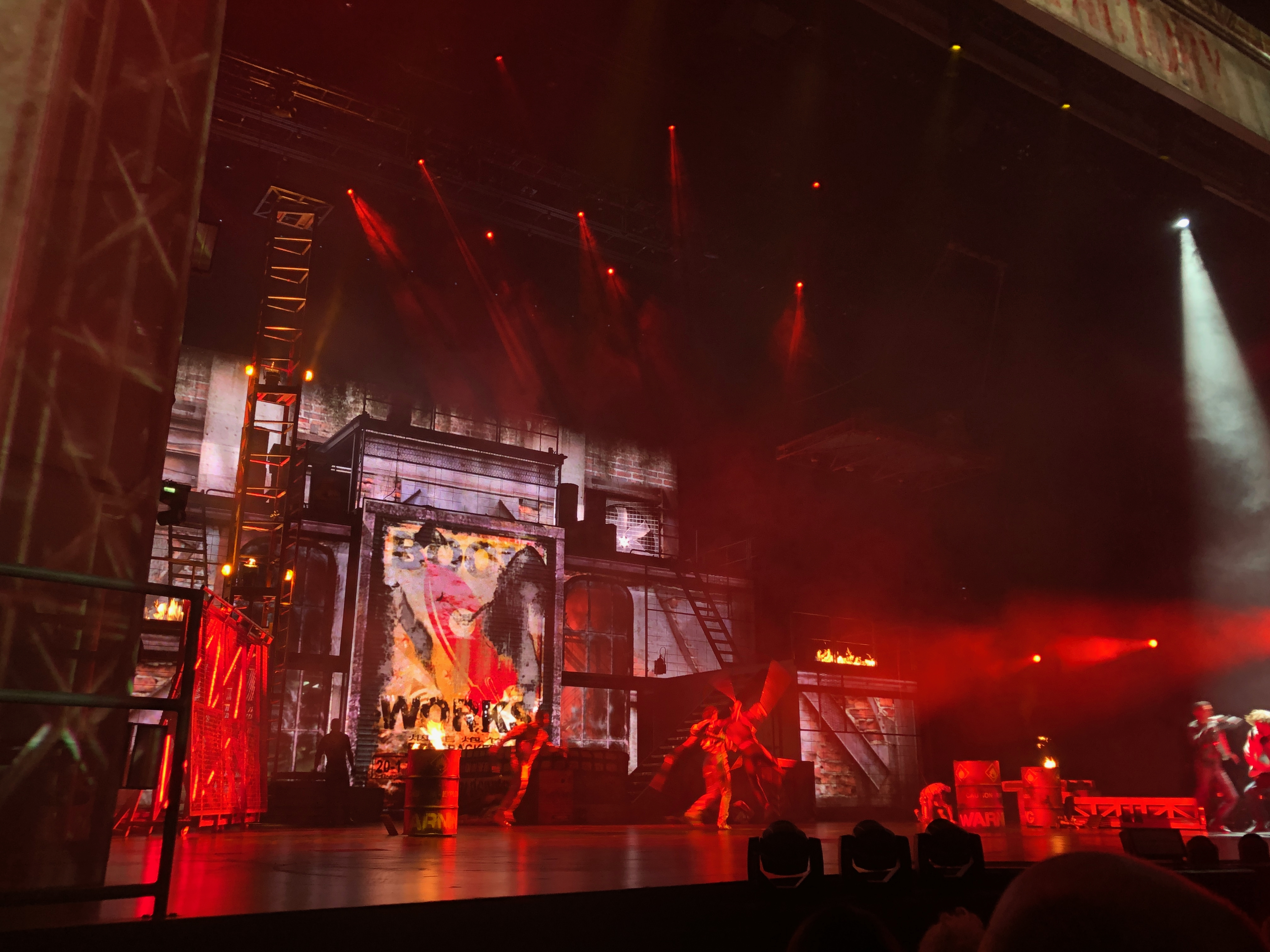
The "Boom Brawl" scene

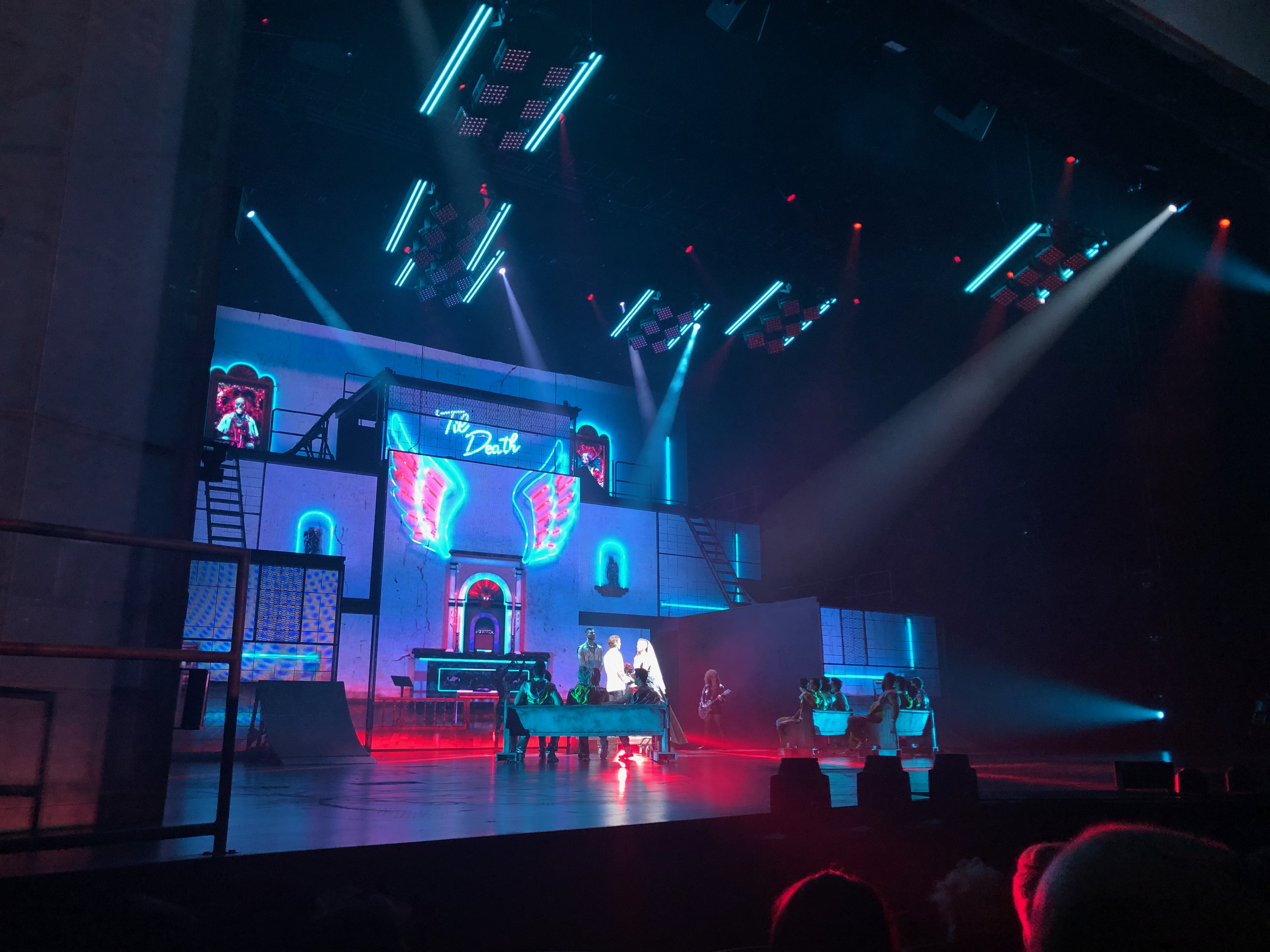
The "Til Death" scene
