= Crystal (Cirque du Soleil) =

Arena-touring show by Cirque du Soleil

- Logo for Cirque du Soleil's Crystal
- Company: Cirque du Soleil
- Genre: Contemporary circus
- Show type: Touring show
- Date of premiere: December 13, 2017 (Quebec)
- Final show: June 8, 2025 (Vancouver, BC)

Creative team
- Creative Director: Stefan Miljevic
- Show Director: Shana Carroll & Sébastien Soldevila
- Acrobatic Equipment: Fred Gérard
- Set Designer: Stéphane Roy
- Video Content Designer: Johnny Ranger
- Music Composer: Maxim Lepage
- Lighting Designer: Éric Champoux
- Props Designer: Anne-Séguin Poirier
- Costume Designer: Marie Chantale Vaillancourt
- Makeup Designer: Véronique St-Germain
- Choreographer: Geneviève Dorion-Coupal
- Skating Performances Senior Designer: Kurt Browning
- Skating Performances Designer: Benjamin Agosto
- Synchronized Skating Designer: Marilyn Langlois
- Performance Designer: Raphael Cruz

Other information
- Preceded by: Volta (2017)
- Succeeded by: Bazzar (2018)
- Official website

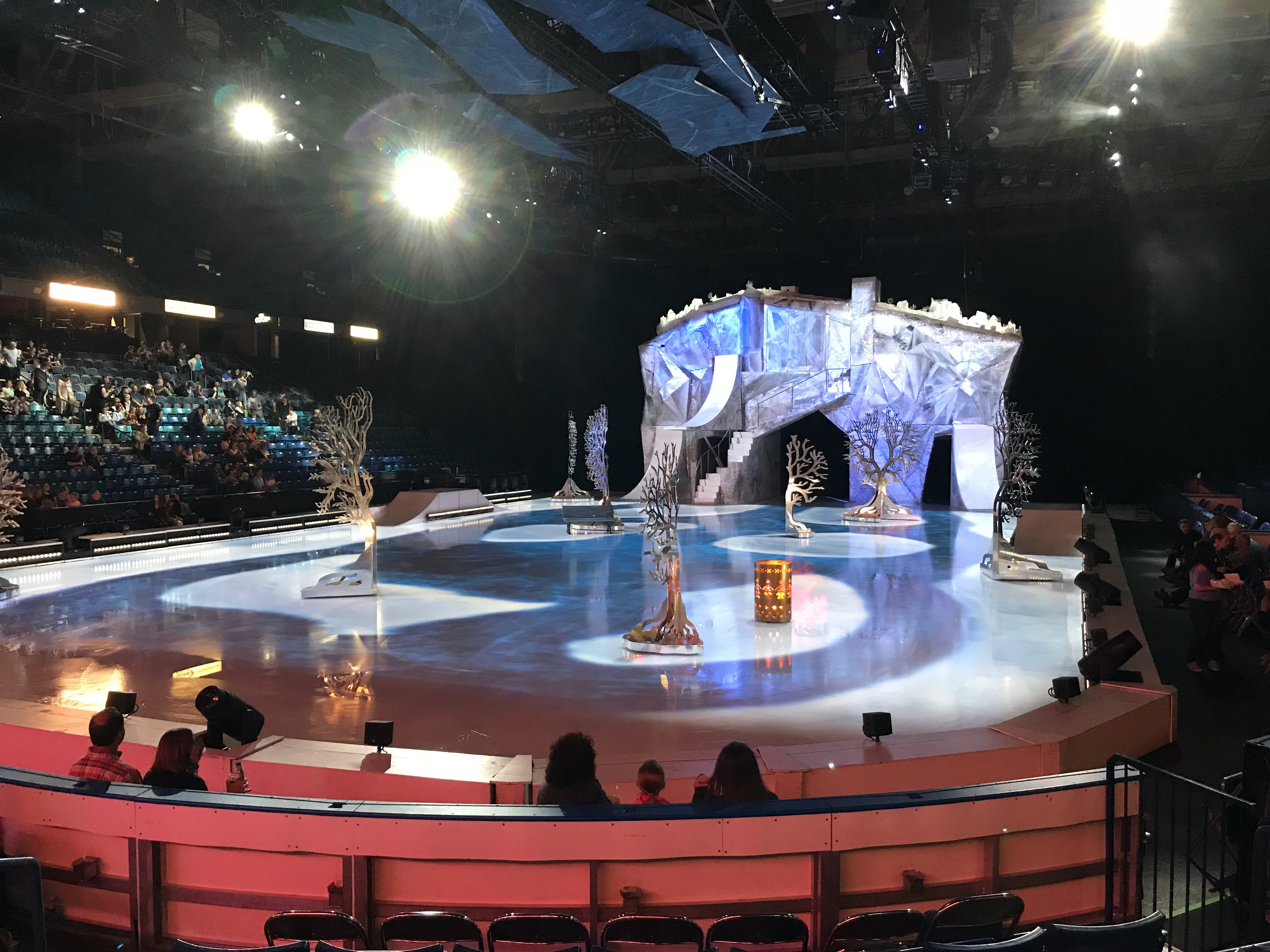
Photo of Cirque Crystal in May 2018, in Saskatoon, Saskatchewan, Canada

Crystal was an arena touring show by Cirque du Soleil that started previewing to the public in October 2017, with an official premiere in December 2017. It is Cirque du Soleil's 42nd original show since 1984, and the first one done on an ice rink, where most of the performers are ice skating throughout the show, and blends several circus acts with high-level ice skating. It is described as a woman shattering reality to discover herself in the world of possibility.

Kurt Browning, a four-time world champion Canadian figure skater, joined the creative team as the Skating Performances Senior Designer, along with Benjamin Agosto, four-time world medalist American ice dancer, as the Skating Performances Designer.

== Music ==
- Cover of U2's "Beautiful Day" performed by Cyrille Aimée.
- Cover of Beyonce's "Halo" performed by Gabrielle Shonk.
- Cover of Nina Simone's "Sinnerman" performed by Betty Bonifassi.
- Cover of Sia's "Chandelier" performed by Ariane Moffatt.

== Reception ==
Crystal had its first preview public performances in some second-tier US markets, before officially premiering in Quebec in December 2017. In one of the first reviews of the show, YQG Rocks entertainment critic Dan Savoie said of the Windsor, Ontario show at the WFCU Centre on January 3, 2018: "Crystal was an astonishing demonstration and is gorgeous in every way. The ice seemed to enhance the movements and made the performers appear to move faster."
