= Kurios (Cirque du Soleil) =

Cirque du Soleil touring production

- Logo for Cirque du Soleil's Kurios: Cabinet of Curiosities
- Company: Cirque du Soleil
- Genre: Contemporary circus
- Show type: Touring show
- Date of premiere: April 24, 2014 (Montreal)

Creative team
- Director: Michel Laprise
- Director of creation: Chantal Tremblay
- Set designer: Stéphane Roy
- Composers: Raphaël Beau, Bob & Bill (Guy Dubuc and Marc Lessard)
- Costume designer: Philippe Guillotel
- Lighting designer: Martin Labrecque
- Choreographers: Sidi Larbi Cherkaoui; Yaman Okur
- Acrobatic choreographers: Andrea Ziegler; Ben Potvin; Susan Gaudreau
- Sound designer: Jacques Boucher; Jean-Michel Caron
- Makeup designer: Eleni Uranis
- Acrobatic performance designers: Rob Bollinger; Germain Guillemot; Boris Verkhovsky
- Rigging designer: Danny Zen
- Production manager: Gabriel Pinkstone
- Chief production officer and executive producer: Charles Joron
- Creative guide: Jean-François Bouchard

Other information
- Preceded by: Michael Jackson: One (2013)
- Succeeded by: Joyà (2014)
- Official website

Kurios is a Cirque du Soleil touring production which premiered on April 24, 2014, in Montreal, Quebec, Canada under the full title of Kurios: Cabinet of Curiosities. Created and directed by Michel Laprise, it looks at a late 19th-century world inventor who invents a machine that defies the laws of time, space, and dimension. As he reinvents everything around him with steampunk elements, he is joined by characters from another dimension who interact with him.

== Acts ==
Acts currently in the show include:

- Chaos synchro (synchronized dance)
- Russian cradle
- Aerial bicycle
- Contortion
- Balancing on chairs
- Rola bola
- Acro net
- Aerial straps
- Yo-yo
- Banquine

Acts in rotation:

- Aerial cart
- Solo Aerial Straps

Retired Acts:

- Chinese pole
- Handbalancing (Réserve)
- Juggling (Réserve)

== Music ==
The score, composed by Raphaël Beau in collaboration with Guy Dubuc and Marc Lessard (known as Bob and Bill), fuses jazz with electro swing.

The soundtrack was released on December 9, 2014. A CD launch, "Kurios about Music", took place at the December 10, 2014, show, which included an off-stage performance by the Kurios band and an after-show party.

=== Track titles ===
1. "11h11" (Opening)
2. "Steampunk Telegram" (Aerial Bike)
3. "Bella Donna Twist" (Chaos Synchro 1900)
4. "Gravity Levitas" (Russian Cradle)
5. "Monde inversé" (Upside Down World)
6. "Hypnotique" (Contortion)
7. "Departure" (Theater of hands/Transition into Rola Bola)
8. "Fearsome Flight" (Rola Bola)
9. "Clouds" (Acro Net)
10. "Créature de siam" (Aerial Straps Duo)
11. "Wat U No Wen" (Banquine)
12. "You Must be Joking" (Finale)

=== Vocalists ===
- Erini Tornesaki - from April 24, 2014, to March 19, 2017
- Estelle Esse - from May 2014, to May 16, 2014
- Sophie Guay - from March 19, 2017, to present

Backup singers:

- Christa Mercy - from May 2014, to January 2017
- Lana Cenic - May 5, 2017, to February 2020

== Critical reception ==
The Toronto Star praised the show and critic Richard Ouzounian, saying "Kurios is Cirque du Soleil's strongest act in years." The Gazette also declared Kurios a success, saying it was "...a classic. It runs like clockwork and could tick on forever." The Globe and Mail described it as a "kinetic, whimsical and astounding new production".

On the show's debut in San Francisco, the San Francisco Chronicle called Kurios "the best Cirque du Soleil show in a long time". The San Jose Mercury News wrote, "For its 30th anniversary, Cirque du Soleil has concocted a dark and mysterious world that eschews the brightly colored eye candy for which the French Canadian juggernaut has become famous."

Chris Jones of the Chicago Tribune wrote: "Well, the Cirque has come roaring back with a dazzling, hyper-detailed, potent, quixotic and generally fantastic show that reveals this extraordinary artistic company's singular capacity for exploration and metamorphosis. It is not to be missed on any account. Even the music, sung by the Greek vocalist Eirini Tornesaki, is beguiling."
