= Echo (Cirque du Soleil) =

Cirque du Soleil tour

- Company: Cirque du Soleil
- Genre: Contemporary circus
- Show type: Touring show
- Date of premiere: April 27, 2023
- Final show: Running

Creative team
- Director: Mukhtar Omar Sharif Mukhtar
- Director of creation: Chantal Tremblay
- Composers: Jade Pybus; Andy Theakstone; Hugo Montecristo
- Costume designer: Nicolas Vaudelet
- Set designer: Es Devlin

Other information
- Preceded by: Mad Apple (2022)
- Succeeded by: Songblazers (2024)
- Official website

Echo is a touring Cirque du Soleil show that premiered on April 27, 2023. It features the story of a girl named Future and her dog Ewai, who meet various characters along their journey and rebuild the 23-foot Cube in the center of the stage, which represents the natural world.

== Characters ==
Cirque du Soleil Echo features many characters.

- Future: the protagonist of the story.
- Ewai the dog: Future's energetic dog.
- Cartographer: The master of exploration that guides Future on her journey.
- Double Trouble: Two clowns who repeatedly try to stack many boxes on top of each other, in humorous ways such as balancing on a ladder or simply throwing it to the top.
- Color Paper People: Korean cradle act.

== Acts ==
Echo features a variety of acts, typical of Cirque du Soleil shows.

The current running order is:

- Opening
- Symbiosis (Cube suspension)
- Bungee Straps
- Icarian Games
- Double Hair Suspension
- Double Trouble (Clown l)
- Human Cradle
- Marionette

Intermission

- Entr'acte/A dark cloud
- Double Slackwire
- Aerial Poles
- Juggling
- Double Trouble (Clown ll)
- Dislocation
- Washington Trapeze
- Teeterboards
- Finale

Acts in Rotation:

- Dance Trapeze
- Contortion
- Aerial Loops Duo
- Cyr Wheel
- Solo Hair Suspension

Retired Acts:

- Chrysalid (Flying Poles)
- Diabolo
- Cube Manipulation
