= Mark Cornell =

British businessman

- Born: Mark Ralph Delano Cornell; 30 May 1966 (age 60)
- Education: Winchester College, Royal Military Academy Sandhurst, International Institute for Management Development (MBA)
- Occupation: Businessman
- Title: CEO, Cirque du Soleil
- Spouse: Lucy Gordon Lennox
- Children: 2 sons and 2 daughters

Mark Ralph Delano Cornell (born 30 May 1966) is a British businessman, who was formerly the CEO of Krug Champagne, Moët Hennessy USA, Sotheby's Europe and CEO of Ambassador Theatre Group. He is the president & CEO of Cirque du Soleil.

== Background ==
Mark Cornell was educated at Winchester College in Winchester, England where he was awarded an entry scholarship to The Royal Military Academy Sandhurst. After being commissioned, he served in the British Armed Forces with the Royal Green Jackets from 1985 to 1992. During that time he completed three tours of duty in Northern Ireland.

In 1996 Cornell received a post-graduate diploma from the Chartered Institute of Marketing. In 1999 he was awarded a Masters of Business Administration(MBA) degree from International Institute for Management Development in Lausanne, Switzerland.

== Business career ==
In March 2013, Cornell became the managing director of Sotheby's for Europe, UK, MENA, and Russia. In February 2016, he became the CEO of ATG Entertainment headquartered in Woking, England. In September 2024, he was appointed as the non-executive chairman of Sapling Spirits.

In November 2025, he was appointed the president and CEO of Cirque du Soleil.

== Government and charity work ==
Mark Cornell, as CEO of Ambassador Theatre Group, was appointed a member of the Cultural Renewal Taskforce set up by the UK's Department for Digital, Culture, Media and Sport (DCMS) in May 2020. The taskforce, chaired by Culture Secretary Oliver Dowden, aim was helping the recreation and leisure sectors, including arts, culture, and sports, reopen safely after COVID-19 lockdowns.

Cornell also served from 2017 as a trustee of LAMDA, a leading drama school in Hammersmith, London.
