= MSC Grandiosa =

Cruise ship operated by MSC Cruises

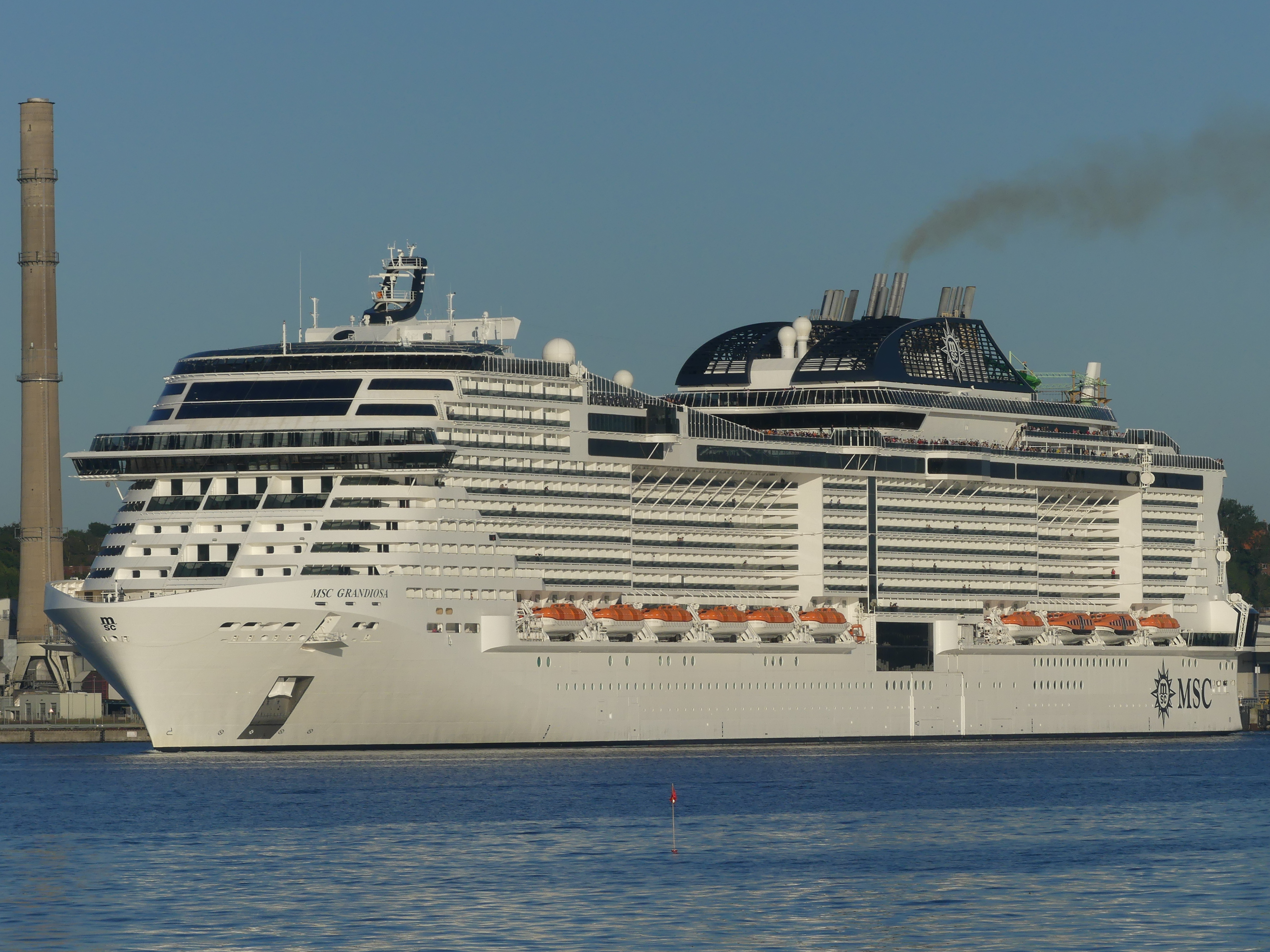
- MSC Grandiosa in Kiel, 2022

History

Malta
- Name: MSC Grandiosa
- Owner: MSC Cruises
- Operator: MSC Cruises
- Port of registry: Valletta, Malta
- Ordered: 1 February 2016
- Builder: Chantiers de l’Atlantique; (Saint-Nazaire, France)
- Yard number: G34
- Laid down: July 2018
- Launched: 5 January 2019
- Sponsored by: Sophia Loren
- Christened: 9 November 2019
- Acquired: 31 October 2019
- In service: 2019–present
- Identification: Call sign: 9HA5063; IMO number: 9803613; MMSI number: 215325000
- Status: In service

General characteristics
- Class & type: Meraviglia Plus-class cruise ship
- Tonnage: 181,541 GT
- Length: 331.43 m (1,087.4 ft)
- Beam: 43 m (141 ft)
- Height: 65 m (213 ft)
- Decks: 19
- Speed: 22.3 kn (41.3 km/h; 25.7 mph)
- Capacity: 4,842 (double occupancy); 6,334 (maximum)
- Crew: 1,704

MSC Grandiosa is a Meraviglia Plus-class cruise ship owned and operated by MSC Cruises. Built by Chantiers de l'Atlantique in Saint-Nazaire, France, she is the first of three Meraviglia Plus-class ships set to operate for the cruise line. She commenced operations on 10 November 2019.

== History ==
=== Construction and debut ===
On 1 February 2016, MSC Cruises announced that they had converted their options for two new ships into firm orders, with the new vessels being a part of a sub-class that evolves from the cruise line's original Meraviglia-class platform, dubbed "Meraviglia Plus". Each new vessel was designed to be larger than their older Meraviglia-class sisters, at 181,541 GT, with a maximum passenger capacity of 6,334 guests.

On 15 November 2017, on the day of the ship's steel-cutting ceremony at the STX France shipyard, MSC Cruises announced that the name of the first Meraviglia Plus-class ship would be MSC Grandiosa. Her coin ceremony was performed in July 2018 and her float-out occurred six months later, on 5 January 2019. She successfully completed her sea trials in September 2019. MSC Grandiosa was delivered to MSC Cruises in a ceremony at the Chantiers de l'Atlantique shipyard on 31 October 2019. Following her delivery, MSC Grandiosa sailed her first voyage from the shipyard to Hamburg for press events and her christening, with calls in Rotterdam and Le Havre.

On 9 November 2019, the ship was christened in a ceremony by her godmother, Sophia Loren, whilst being moored in the river Elbe. The ship later returned to her dock at the Port of Hamburg before embarking on her inaugural cruise the following day, on 10 November 2019. Her inaugural cruise set sail on 10 November 2019 from Hamburg to Genoa via Southampton, Barcelona, and Marseille, and was also hampered by a storm that forced the cancellation of Lisbon.

=== Operational career ===
Beginning on 23 November 2019, MSC Grandiosa began sailing weekly Mediterranean itineraries for her inaugural season, calling in Genoa, Rome, Palermo, Valletta, Barcelona, and Marseille. On 30 December 2019, at the Port of Palermo, the ship struck the Vittorio Veneto pier with her stern on the port side when maneuvering to dock. Minor damage was reported on her stern and the pier, but no injuries were reported, and the ship left for Valletta later that day.

MSC Grandiosa was originally expected to continue sailing in the Mediterranean until repositioning to Santos, Brazil in autumn 2020 to begin cruising in South America for the 2020–2021 season, which would have made her the largest passenger ship to ever homeport in South America. However, after the COVID-19 pandemic forced MSC to reduce its operations and redeploy its fleet, MSC Grandiosa was ultimately scheduled to continue sailing Mediterranean cruises through 2021. On 16 August 2020, she also became MSC's first ship to resume operations amid the pandemic, and the first major cruise ship overall to restart operations in the Mediterranean since the cessation of cruises earlier in the year.

On 25 November 2023, she arrived in Santos, Brazil to begin cruising for the 2023-2024 Brazilian Season, calling in Búzios, Salvador, and Maceió. MSC Grandiosa is confirmed in the 2024-2025 Brazilian Season with the same itineraries.

On 16 May 2024, MSC announced she will start 7 day eastern and western Caribbean itineraries sailing from Port Canaveral Florida beginning in December 2025.

== Design and specifications ==
MSC Grandiosa measures 181,541 GT and houses 2,421 passenger cabins for a total guest capacity of 6,334 passengers. The ship also employs 1,704 crew members. She has a length of 331.43 metres (1,087.4 ft), a beam of 43 metres (141 ft), a height of 65 metres (213 ft), and a maximum speed of 22.3 knots (41.3 km/h; 25.7 mph). She is also MSC's first cruise ship to be equipped with a selective catalytic reduction system that helps to reduce the ship's nitrogen oxide emissions by 80 percent, along with a closed-loop exhaust gas cleaning system that reduces her sulfur emissions by 97 percent.
