= Mad Apple =

Cirque du Soleil show in Las Vegas, Nevada (2022-pres.)

- Company: Cirque du Soleil
- Genre: Contemporary circus
- Show type: Resident show
- Date of premiere: May 12, 2022
- Final show: September 5, 2026
- Location: New York-New York Hotel and Casino, Las Vegas

Creative team
- Co-creator and director: Simon Painter
- Director: Neil Dorward
- Composer: Evan Duffy
- Official website

Mad Apple was a show by Cirque du Soleil at the New York-New York Hotel and Casino in Las Vegas, Nevada. This show opened in May 2022, replacing Zumanity at the hotel.

== Critical reception ==
The Los Angeles Times wrote "The stage production, which has been taking rapt audiences through a fantastical night on the town in New York City, is at once familiar and groundbreaking, with several features never-before-seen in Cirque du Soleil performances, including stand-up comedy."

The Las Vegas Review-Journal said "“Mad Apple” is not the Cirque we’ve come to know over the years, and that's all right from here. It's a good time with a fresh and fun cast. You'll walk out impressed at all the thought and talent Cirque packs into a show, and that's what it's all about."
