= Amaluna =

Former Cirque du Soleil touring show

- Logo for Cirque du Soleil's Amaluna
- Company: Cirque du Soleil
- Genre: Contemporary circus
- Show type: Touring show
- Date of premiere: April 19, 2012 (Montreal)
- Final show: March 1, 2020 (Sacramento, CA)

Creative team
- Director: Diane Paulus

Other information
- Preceded by: Michael Jackson: The Immortal World Tour (2011)
- Succeeded by: Michael Jackson: One (2013)
- Official website

Amaluna was a touring show by Cirque du Soleil. It was created and directed by Diane Paulus and is loosely inspired by The Tempest by William Shakespeare. It opened in Montréal, Quebec, Canada, on April 19, 2012. The cast is 70% female. They performed their last show in Sacramento, California, US, on March 1, 2020.

== Music ==
Track titles as they appear in order on the CD (the items in parentheses reflect the act correlated with each song):

1. All Come Together (Opening 2012 - Present)
2. Elma Om Mi Lize (Icarian and Water meteor 2012 - 2015, Icarian Games 2015 - 2016)
3. Tempest (Storm Straps 2012 - 2014, The Storm and Aerial Straps 2014 - Present)
4. Enchanted Reunion (Suspended Poles and Peacock dance 2012 - Present)
5. Fly Around (Uneven Bars 2012 - 2014)
6. Hope (Vocal Aerial Hoop 2012 - Present)
7. O Ma Ley (Waterbowl-Handbalancing 2012 - Present)
8. Burn Me Up (Teeterboard 2012 - Present)
9. Whisper (Balance Goddess 2012 - Present)
10. Running On The Edge (Tightwire 2012 - 2013)
11. Ena Fee Alyne (Unicycles 2012 - 2013 and 2016 - Present, Hula Hoops 2014 - 2015, Diabolo 2015)
12. Creature Of Light (Chinese Pole and A Thousand Arms and Sticks 2012 - Present, Cyr Wheel 2015 - Present)
13. Mutation (Juggling 2012 - Present)
14. Run (Aerial Straps 2012 - 2014, Banquine 2016 - Present and Finale 2012 - Present)
