= Michael Jackson: One =

Cirque du Soleil production

- Logo
- Company: Cirque du Soleil
- Genre: Contemporary circus
- Show type: Resident show
- Date of premiere: May 23, 2013
- Location: Mandalay Bay, Las Vegas Strip; Paradise, Nevada, U.S.

Creative team
- Writer and director: Jamie King
- Creation director: Welby Altidor
- Associate show director: Carla Kama
- Musical designer: Kevin Antunes
- Set and Props designer: Francois Séguin
- Costume designer: Zaldy Goco
- "Man in Mirror" scene creators: Michel Lemieux and Victor Pilon
- Choreographers: Travis Payne, Rich and Tone Talauega, Parris Goebel, Sidi Larbi Cherkaoui, Ivan Velez, Olivier Simola
- Acrobatic performance designers: Germain Guillemot, Rob Bollinger
- Acrobatic choreographers: Ben Potvin, Andrea Ziegler
- Projection designers: Raymond St-Jean, Jimmy Lakatos
- Lighting designer: David Finn
- Sound designer: Jonathan Deans
- Acrobatic equipment and rigging designer: Pierre Masse
- Makeup designer: Nathalie Gagné

Other information
- Preceded by: Amaluna (2012)
- Succeeded by: Kurios (2014)
- Official website

Michael Jackson: One is the second Michael Jackson-based production by Cirque du Soleil, after Michael Jackson: The Immortal World Tour.

Like The Immortal World Tour, the production was written and directed by Jamie King, but only uses prerecorded tracks, with no live orchestra. One evokes the entertainer's artistic style in several ways and is the most dance-driven Cirque du Soleil show.

It was announced to the public and media on February 21, 2013, began previews on May 23, 2013, and held its official world premiere on June 29, 2013, at the Mandalay Bay on the Las Vegas Strip in Paradise, Nevada. Marketing efforts in 2013 included the release of "sneak peek" videos of several production numbers, including "2 Bad", "Stranger in Moscow", "Bad", and "Smooth Criminal". With 4500 shows and 5.5 million tickets sold by January 2025, Michael Jackson: One is one of the most successful Cirque du Soleil productions of all time.

== The show ==
The show's plot is centered on four "misfits" who set out on a journey into Michael Jackson's world and music. By journey's end, they personify Jackson's agility, courage, playfulness and love. These values are represented with his solo white glove, sequined white socks and black shoes, hat, and sunglasses.

Each of four main characters receives an object from Jackson. First, Clumsy is given the shoes, and with his newfound balance, performs a double slackline act to "Bad." Next, Shy overcomes her name when she receives Jackson's glasses, and she vanquishes a troupe of warriors in a martial arts display set to "2000 Watts" and "Jam." Then, Smarty Pants, the de facto leader of the four, puts on Jackson's hat and is imbued with the artist's legendary gracefulness in "Smile." Finally, Sneaky, the troublemaker, performs a playful manipulation act with the rogue glove to "This Place Hotel" and "Workin' Day and Night."

== Characters ==
- Michael Jackson – the misfits' spirit guide;
- Mephisto – the antagonist who represents the paparazzi and tabloid media;
- Clumsy – the misfit who gains balance with Jackson's white socks and black loafers;
- Shy – the misfit who uses Jackson's sunglasses to overcome her introversion;
- Smarty Pants – the de facto leader of the misfits; uses Jackson's fedora to display gracefulness;
- Sneaky – the troublemaking misfit who performs a playful manipulation act using Jackson's sparkly glove;
- Various villains – opponents whom the misfits encounter and must defeat to complete their adventurous journey;
- Warriors – the heroes of the show who use white jackets and white fedoras to defeat Mephisto.

== Setlist ==
- "Privacy" (pre-show music)
- "The Vortex" (video interlude)*
- "Beat It"
- "Leave Me Alone" / "Tabloid Junkie" / "2 Bad"
- "Stranger in Moscow" / "Will You Be There" (spoken outro)
- "Bad"
- "Smooth Criminal"
- "I'll Be There"
- "Human Nature" / "Never Can Say Goodbye"
- "2000 Watts" / "Jam"
- "They Don't Care About Us"
- "Planet Earth" / "Earth Song"
- "Smile"
- "Wanna Be Startin' Somethin'"
- "PYT (Pretty Young Thing)" / The Way You Make Me Feel" / "You Rock My World"
- "Dangerous" / "Dirty Diana" / "In the Closet"
- "This Place Hotel" (instrumental) / "Workin' Day and Night"
- "Billie Jean"
- "Scream"
- "Thriller"
- "Speechless" (2013–2024)
- "The Mime Segment" (2024–present)
- "I Just Can't Stop Loving You"
- "Man in the Mirror"
- "Can You Feel It"
- "Black or White"
- "Don't Stop 'Til You Get Enough" (curtain call music)
- "Remember the Time" (post-show music pre-2014)
- "Love Never Felt So Good" (post-show music from 2014–present)

== Acts ==
- "The Vortex" – Intro
- "Beat It" – Dance Number
- "Leave Me Alone" / "Tabloid Junkie" / "2 Bad" – Dance Number
- "Stranger in Moscow" – Spanish Web (Réserve: Aerial Silks)
- "Bad" – Slack line
- "Smooth Criminal" – Japanese Men's Rhythmic Gymnastics
- "Human Nature" – Contortion (2013–Unknown), Free Style Dancing (Unknown–Present)
- "Jam" – Martial Arts
- "They Don't Care About Us" – March Routine
- "Earth Song" – Shadow Puppets
- "Smile" – Solo Dance
- "Wanna Be Startin' Somethin'" – Diabolo
- "The Way You Make Me Feel" – Dance Number
- "Dangerous" / "Dirty Diana" / "In the Closet" – Pole Dance
- "This Place Hotel" – Glove Manipulation
- "Billie Jean" – Glow-in-the-dark Dance Routine
- "Scream" – Video Projection
- "Thriller" – Trampoline
- "Speechless" – Interlude (2013–2024)
- "The Mime Segment – Interlude (2024–Present)
- "I Just Can't Stop Loving You" – Aerial hoops
- "Man in the Mirror" – Dance Number
- "Black or White" – Finale
