= Solstrom =

- DVD Cover
- Country of origin: Canada
- No. of episodes: 13

Production
- Running time: 44 minutes

Original release
- Network: CBC
- Release: November 30, 2003 – 2004

Solstrom is a Cirque du Soleil television series in thirteen 45-minute episodes from 2003. It was initially broadcast on the U.S. Bravo cable network and aired on Bold in Canada and SBS Television in Australia. It has also been released on DVD.

== Overview ==
The series is structured as a unique combination of the variety show and sitcom format. Its episodes connect assorted circus acts and variety acts using simple storylines, all of which emerge from the premise that a diverse group of extraterrestrial creatures with transformative powers has arrived on Earth. Invisible to humans, these creatures from the sun individually observe and magically alter various situations wherever they go, changing normal humans into graceful and athletic performers, transforming their mundane realities, and enchanting them to perform graceful acts of wonder. Meanwhile, an eccentric scientist named Fogus Punch (performed by Cirque du Soleil veteran clown John Gilkey and voiced by Alex Ivanovici) remotely observes the creatures' interactions through an observatory telescope.

The series features regular performers from Cirque du Soleil's live shows as well as many accomplished guest performers, including partners and family members, clowns and Guinness Book record holders. Some acts are creative re-adaptations of performers' acts from Cirque du Soleil's other productions; other acts feature performers and acts that have never appeared in any of the company's other shows. Music from previous Cirque du Soleil shows accompanies some of Solstrom's acts, though a great deal of original music was written by several different composers to accompany other acts.

== Sun creatures ==
Each episode features one or more characters appropriated from one of Cirque du Soleil's stage shows, here presented as "creatures" from the sun who catalyze the other characters' various transformations from mundane to magical. Their roles are largely confined to brief appearances where they initiate transformations by blowing "solar winds" on the people they encounter. Below is a list of the sun creatures in the order they appear in the series. Listed after each creature is the name of the Cirque du Soleil show in which the character originally appeared.

- Fiona, one of the baroques (Saltimbanco) played by Andrea Conway
- Les Cons (La Nouba)
- Zebras (O)
- The Baron (Saltimbanco)
- Gaia (Dralion)
- "Quidam" (Quidam)
- Boum-Boum (Quidam)
- L'Ame Force (Dralion)
- Lizard (Varekai)
- The Aviator (Quidam)
- The Comet (O)
- The Dreamer (Saltimbanco)
- The Guide (Varekai)
- Venus (Mystère)
- The Barrel Organ Grinder (O)

At the beginning of the episode Wind from the Past, some classic Alegria characters appears as children version. As Sun creatures, they don't appear in the episode with the exception of their landing of the shuttle, accompanied by The Dreamer (which is itself the main creature of the episode).

- Baby White Singer (Alegria)
- Baby Monsieur Fleur (Alegria)
- Baby Tamir (Alegria)
- Baby Shoulder-Pole Wire act character (voltigeur) (Alegria)
- Baby Shoulder-Pole Wire act character (porteur) (Alegria)

The last episode takes place on a space station frequented by the Sun creatures. Although they does not come on Earth (and therefore are not perceived in any one episode besides this one), here is the list of these Sun creatures:

- Moon Head (O) (note that this character is the creature associated with the episode Cosmic Wind: he descends from the shuttle at the beginning of each episode. In fact, he is the only main Sun creatures in the serie to never blow solar wind)
- One of the Double Faces (Mystère)
- Two Nostalgic Old Birds (Alegria)
- Bungee act character (Mystère)
- A Spermatos (Mystère)
- Two Musicians (Alegria)

== Episodes ==
Each episode has a different theme that is explored through various loosely interwoven storylines.

- Wind of Romance (set in Italy)

An Italian village becomes a festival of passionate excursions.

- Twin Winds (set in Brazil)

A vain man pursues his stolen reflection in a world of pairs.

- Howling Winds (set in Transylvania)

An old-fashioned hotel turns into a haunted house of fun and horror.

- Rockin' Wind (set in France)

An orchestra rehearsal goes awry and takes on a rock 'n' roll beat.

- Once Upon a Wind (set in London)

A storybook turns those who touch it into adventure heroes.

- Wind of Freedom (set in the Caribbean)

Prisoners flee captivity by exceptional means.

- Ghostly Wind (set in Hollywood, California)

A night watchman is frightened by costumes brought to life in a warehouse.

- Gone With the Winds (set in Nevada)

An airport employee experiences a unique adventure in the desert.

- Wind from the Past (set in Quebec)

For a fleeting moment, an old man becomes a child in the world of his toy box.

- Winds of Courage (also set in Quebec)

An armchair sports fan enters into a series of competitive games.

- Wind of Imagination (set in New York City)

A boy's building blocks become an actual construction site.

- Wind of Life (set in Austria)

In a toy shop in Salzburg, an old artisan's marionette comes to life.

- Cosmic Wind (set in outer space)

Creatures of the sun live it up in an intergalactic discothèque.
