= Le Cirque World's Top Performers =

Italian circus entertainment company

- Company type: Private
- Industry: Entertainment
- Founded: 2015; 10 years ago in Italy
- Founder: Gianpiero Garelli
- Headquarters: Italy
- Area served: Europe
- Key people: Onofrio Colucci; Anatoliy Zalevskyy
- Number of employees: 70+
- Website: lecirquetopperformers.com

Le Cirque World's Top Performers is a contemporary circus company based in Italy, founded in 2015 on the initiative of the entrepreneur Gianpiero Garelli, and it presents circus entertainment shows which include balancing, acrobatics, tightrope walking, contortionism, juggling, comedy, dance, and music. The company is made up of over 70 artists from all over the world. Animals are never used in their shows. The artists have a background of performing with other famous "new circus" troupes and shows including Nouveau Cirque, Slava's Snowshow, and Cirque du Soleil.

== ALIS ==
In 2016, Le Cirque made its debut in the Italian city of Lucca, premiering their first show, titled ALIS. The performance was inspired by Alice in Wonderland and the fantastic literature of the 1800s.

The first tour took place in a traditional circus tent, with 33 shows in 9 cities: Ancona, Ascoli Piceno, Chieti, Piacenza, Riccione, Viterbo, Lucca, Bergamo, Alba. The next six tours were staged in the arenas and theatres of other Italian cities, including Brescia, Turin, Genoa, Forlì, Bologna, Padua, Florence, Bolzano, Trieste, and Milan.

The eighth tour took place in Switzerland between March and April 2019, in Lugano, Zürich, Lausanne, Basel, and Geneva.

The ninth ALIS tour, titled Nuovo Alis (new Alis), took place in Italy between December 2019 and January 2020.

The artistic director of ALIS is Onofrio Colucci, an artist known for his starring role in Slava's Snowshow, for which he won the Lunas del Auditorio prize, as well as the Cirque du Soleil shows O, Zaia, and Zed.

== TILT ==
On 15 May 2019, Le Cirque announced the production of their second show, named TILT, and loosely inspired by Steven Spielberg's movie Ready Player One. The artistic director of TILT is Anatoliy Zalevskyy, who also worked for Cirque du Soleil and was awarded the Golden Clown at the International Circus Festival of Monte-Carlo in 1999.

The first Italian TILT tour is taking place between November 2019 and January 2020.
