= Zaia =

Cirque du Soleil show

Coordinates: 22°8′55″N 113°33′38″E

- Logo for Cirque du Soleil's Zaia
- Company: Cirque du Soleil
- Genre: Contemporary circus
- Show type: Resident show
- Date of premiere: August 28, 2008
- Final show: February 19, 2012
- Location: The Venetian Macao, Cotai Strip, Macau

Creative team
- Artistic guide: Guy Laliberté; Gilles Ste-Croix
- Creation director: Neilson Vignola
- Writer and director: Gilles Maheu
- Set and props designer, theater concept: Guillaume Lord
- Costume designer: Dominique Lemieux
- Composer and musical director: Violaine Corradi
- Choreographer: Martino Müller
- Acrobatic choreographer: Jeff Hall
- Acrobatic performance designer: Rob Bollinger
- Artistic equipment and rigging designer: Guy Lemire
- Lighting designer: Alex Morgenthaler
- Projection designer: Jimmy Lakatos; Raymond Saint-Jean
- Sound designer: Steven Dubuc
- Makeup designer: Nathalie Gagné
- Clown acts designer: Leonid Leykin

Other information
- Preceded by: Wintuk (2007)
- Succeeded by: Zed (2008)
- Official website

Zaia was a Cirque du Soleil stage production based at The Venetian Macao on the Cotai Strip in Macau. The 90-minute show opened in August 2008, bringing together 75 high-calibre artists from around the world. Zaia was Cirque du Soleil's first resident show in Asia and was directed by Neilson Vignola and Gilles Maheu. The custom-built theater housing the performance was capable of seating 1,800 spectators at a time.

Zaia presented a young girl's dream of journeying into space, discovering worlds populated by a panoply of otherworldly creatures. The title, Zaia, came from a Greek name meaning "life".

Due in part to a drop in attendance during the Great Recession, the show closed on 19 February 2012. Despite its closing, Venetian Macao resort owner Las Vegas Sands Corp. claimed, "Using Las Vegas as a benchmark, Zaia’s 3 1/2-year run should be deemed successful and provide strong support for the argument that the future of entertainment in Macau is on the right track."

== History ==
Zaia opened in 2008 and had a rough start, due in part to the Great Recession which hurt audience turnout. With the addition of Chinese-style elements such as a lion dance performance and a flying dragon, increased ticket sales were eventually reported. Despite the improved box office sales, the show was still recording losses in 2011, Sands China president Edward Tracy revealed on 18 November 2011. The Venetian Macau show remained "the only business sector that doesn’t make a profit," he added. Criticism from Sands China chairman Sheldon Adelson led to rumours that the 10-year contract of Zaia would be terminated earlier. But Edward Tracy rejected this possibility. "We are prepared to take a loss to provide that kind of entertainment," he stressed. On 7 February 2012, Sands China and Cirque du Soleil announced that Zaia would close on 19 February 2012.

== Cast ==
Some of Zaia's creatures and characters are listed below.

- Zaia: She was the main character; her journey was the show's premise.
- Romeo: He fell for Zaia and performed a straps duet.
- Clowns: Five clowns were present in the show, divided into pairs.
- Parents
- Handyman
- Adam and Eve
- Humans
- Artistos: They performed in the aerial act.
- Weathervanes: This group of characters performed in the Chinese poles on globes act and represented the directions on the compass.
- Primitives
- Sage: As the keeper of knowledge, the Sage watched over Zaia.
- Fossils

== Acts ==
Circus and dance elements comprised Zaia's acts, listed below.

- Choreography I - Cityscape: A fast-paced dance act set on a group of high-rise buildings; each performer used different dancing techniques from around the world.
- Aerial bamboo: Zaia's parents dangled on a long bamboo pole. The father clung to the top of the pole while the mother dangled beneath him by wires connecting their teeth, or she held onto his arms or legs.
- Skating: A couple performed a fast-paced dance, continuously circling with roller skates at a high speed on a raised platform.
- Lion dance: An acrobatic take on the lion dance; the performers in lion costumes walked on a seesaw, balanced on globes, and even balanced on each other.
- Choreography II - Dance of the automatons: Another fast-paced dance; each dancer performed as if they were a robot or a toy.
- Juggling: A group of jugglers tossed clubs, balls and rings to each other.
- Flying trapeze: A group of artists swung from one trapeze to another, performing elaborate flips before being caught in mid-air.
- Hand to hand: A man and woman representing Adam and Eve balanced atop each other in a series of poses requiring extraordinary strength.
- Handbalancing: An understudy act for hand to hand, it saw a male performer balance on high handstand canes.
- Aerial straps duo: Zaia performed a stunning aerial straps act with Romeo while two girls performed a cerceau act on the side.
- Choreography III - Fire dance: The dance troupe performed with fire clubs, fire staffs and other fire performance apparatus.
- Trampoline and X-board: An X-shaped trampoline had two crossed teeterboards where the trampoline tracks met. The acrobats would flip on the trampoline and send other performers flying in the air with the X-board.

=== Retired acts ===
- Rola bola: A comical balancing act; a clown created a precarious structure using flexible planks.
- Chinese poles on globes: A group of eight artists performed this dangerous act. Four performers balanced on rolling globes, each with a Chinese pole on one of their shoulders; the other four climbed up these poles and would flip or spin to the next pole.
- Aerial frame: Two cradles were at each end; the porter would send the flyer to a catcher, and the flyer would perform flips while in the air. The two catchers had a swinging apparatus on which they were based.
- Stranger: A clown met another lonely clown while riding in a hot air balloon.
- Overture: One of the clowns performed an act originally created by Denis Lacombe.
- Hoop Manipulation: An act that featured veteran Cirque performer, Elena Lev.
- Dual Aerial Straps: An aerial ballet featuring two performers.
- Aerial Cube: An act previously performed in Mystère and Alegría.
- Aerial Silks: A performer flew around on silks.
- Aerial Hoop: Three performers spun around on a single hoop.

== Costumes ==
Costume designer Dominique Lemieux took inspiration from the inventive dress styles younger generations create for themselves; thus the costumes for Zaia were an eclectic merging of genres. The different styles of outfits represented the differences among the groups of performers. As one of the urban characters, Zaia was seen wearing primarily red, one of the warmer colors. To complement her, Romeo wore warm earth tones with copper and gold highlights. In contrast to the style of the wardrobe of the acrobats and dancers, the clowns wore patches of fabric with patina; their costumes drew inspiration from 18th-century explorers.

== Music ==
The show's score was composed by Violaine Corradi and was released as a CD album on May 26, 2009. Below is a list of the tracks featured on the CD.

1. Noi (Finale)
2. Aestus Calor (Cityscape)
3. Ignis (Zaia's Balloon)
4. Hatahkinn
  - Aerial Bamboo
  - Aerial Silk
  - Hoops (featuring Elena Lev, Jan-Feb 2009)
5. Aquilex
  - Globes and Poles (2008-2010)
  - Transition into Lion Dancing (2010-2012)
6. Comissatio
  - Globes and Poles (2008-2010)
  - Lion Dancing (2010-2012)
7. Blue Ales (Interlude)
8. Adrideo (Clowns, 2008-2010)
9. Ardor Oris (Opening)
10. Aequor Oris (Fire Dance)
11. Caelestis (Aerial Frame)
12. Undae (Interlude)
13. Temperatio
  - Juggling (2008-2010)
  - Roller Skating (2010-2012)
  - Cube Manipulation (Back Up) (2011-2012)
  - Interlude
14. Ellâm Onru (Hand to Hand)
15. Gaudiumni (Trampoline and X-Board)
16. Utinam (Aerial Straps and Hoops)

Other songs:

- Travelling Cowboy (Clown Intro, 2008-2009)
- Montgolfiere (Clown Intro mid 2009-2010)
- Cityscape (Cityscape, mid 2009)
- Automat Dance (Automatons)
  - Cityscape (Previews)
- Alobaloro
  - Rola Bola (2008-2010)
  - Clowns (2010-2012)
- Vishnu (Juggling, 2010-2012)
- Namaste (Flying Trapeze, 2010-2012)

== Filmography ==
In 2011, Cirque du Soleil released Crossroads in Macau, a short documentary about the creation of Zaia.
