= Koozå =

Cirque du Soleil production

- Company: Cirque du Soleil
- Genre: Contemporary circus
- Show type: Touring show
- Date of premiere: April 19, 2007

Creative team
- Writer and director: David Shiner

Other information
- Preceded by: Love (2006)
- Succeeded by: Wintuk (2007)
- Official website

Koozå is a touring circus production by Cirque du Soleil which premiered in Montréal, Quebec, Canada, in 2007. The show was written and directed by David Shiner, who had previously worked as a clown in Cirque du Soleil's production of Nouvelle Expérience. His experience as a clown and his time with Switzerland's Circus Knie and Germany's Circus Roncalli informed his work on Koozå.

== Acts ==
Acts in the show have included:

- Charivari (opening)
- Contortion
- Aerial Hoop
- Duo Unicycle
- Clown (Knighting)
- Highwire

Intermission

- Skeleton Dance/Crooner (choreographed dance number)
- Wheel of Death
- Hoops manipulation
- Clown (Crown)
- Chair balancing
- Teeterboard
- Finale

Acts in Rotation:

- Diabolo
- Solo/Duo Contortion
- Cyr Wheel
- Duo Juggling
- Handbalancing

Retired acts:

- Juggling (Solo)
- Pickpocket
- Hand-to-hand (Réserve)
- Solo Trapeze
- Aerial Straps
- Aerial Silks
- Icarian Games (Réserve)

== Costumes ==
Reflecting Cirque du Soleil's return to more traditional circus arts with clowning and acrobatics, Marie-Chantale Vaillancourt (costume designer) chose a colour palette more in line with traditional circus and burlesque: red, white, and gold. Koozå's costumes are designed from the point of view of a character called the Innocent. The Innocent's costume itself has horizontal stripes and is very ill-fitted, with long sleeves and pant legs too short, illustrating his childlike naïvety. The other main character, the Trickster, is impeccably dressed, with the same coloured stripes as the Innocent, yet his are vertical. The stripes are aligned to such a degree that the lines run directly in line from headpiece to shoe. Much detail was put into piecing the wool-lycra blend pieces together to show the Trickster's mischievous and all-powerful character.

Inspiration for the characters was drawn from graphic novels and comic books, Gustav Klimt paintings, as well as Indian and Eastern European art. As Koozå is dreamt of by the Innocent, many costumes are designed to impress the audience with ideas of children's toys, soldiers, and children's stories. Many of the costumes are also designed to metamorphose. For example, the Charivari performers have controls at their fingertips that will turn their costumes from gold to red in the blink of an eye. These metamorphosis effects were inspired by quick-change artists and magicians.

== Music ==
Composed by Jean-François Côté, the show's music was inspired by the music of India, pop music, 1970s funk, orchestral music, and film scores from the 1940s and 1950s. Below is a list of the tracks featured on the CD, which was released on June 24, 2008. The items in parentheses indicate the related act.

Songs found in the album

1. Koozå Dance (Skeleton dance)
2. Superstar I (Juggling / Diabolo)
3. L'innocent (Charivari, pt 1)
4. Royaume (Charivari, pt 2)
5. Junoon (Contortion)
6. Alambre Alto (High wire)
7. 16-Papillon (Solo trapeze / Aerial hoop / Aerial straps / Cyr Wheel / Aerial silks)
8. Pearl (Unicycle duo, pt 1)
9. Cabaret Sata (Unicycle duo, pt 2)
10. Aankh Micholi (Pickpocket)
11. Diables (Wheel of death, pt 1)
12. El Péndulo de la Muerte (Wheel of death, pt 2)
13. Petit-Jaune (Opening)
14. Superstar II (Juggling / Diabolo)
15. Imposteur (Entr'acte, intro to pickpocket)
16. Prarthana (Balancing on chairs, pt 1)
17. Don't be Afraid (Balancing on chairs, pt 2)
18. Hum Jaisa Na Dekha (Teeterboard)

Other songs

- Démons II (Hand to Hand (original back-up act version) )
- Ao Na (Hand to Hand / Cyr Wheel)
- High Wire Setup Chase (Clown Transition / High Wire Setup)
- High Wire Rock (High Wire Intro)
- Chaise Drone (Balancing on chairs Intro)
- Verto Divum (Hula Hoops)
- Clown Baroque (Clown act)
- Icarian Games (Icarian games / Duo Juggling)

=== Vocalists ===
==== Spirit Singer (formerly Indian singer) ====
- Tara Baswani – from April 2007 (Montreal) to January 2013 (London)
- Meetu Chilana – from 2009 to 2010
- Naomi Zaman – from January 2013 (London) to April 2013 (Madrid)
- Dorothée Doyer – from May 2013 (Bilbao) to June 2014 (Vienna)
- Mary-Pier Guilbault – from June 2014 (Vienna) to December 2015 (Vancouver), From August 2017 (Singapore) to 2020 (Sevilla)
- Alessandra González – from March 2016 (Montevideo) to August 2017 (Singapore)
- Kathryn Holtkamp – from January 2022 (Punta Cana) to Present

==== Soul Singer ====
- Theresa Bailey – from April 2007 (Montreal) to October 2007 (Toronto)
- Cinda RamSeur – from November 2007 to January 2011 (Miami)
- Vedra Chandler – from February 2011 (Tokyo) to April 2015 (Bern)
- Nathaly Lopez – from June 2015 (Columbus) to April 2016 (Montevideo)
- Jennlee Shallow – from April 2016 (Buenos Aires) to July 2016 (Santiago)
- Lisa Ramey – from August 2016 (Sydney) to August 2017 (Singapore)
- Lyrika 'Erica' Ball-Holmes – from August 2017 (Singapore) to June 2018 (Hong Kong)
- Tymara Walker – from June 2018 (Changsha) to March 2019 (Auckland)
- Joanie Goyette – from May 2019 (Valencia) to March 2024 (San Francisco)
- Suzanne Perkins – from March 2024 (San Francisco) to Present

== Critical reception ==
The New York Times, "What is special about this new production is that Mr. Shiner introduces some carefully choreographed chaos and old-fashioned sideshow spark to the rock-solid formula."

Los Angeles Times, "“Kooza,” is a thrilling spectacle jampacked with white-knuckle acrobatic moments."

KQED, "A classic Cirque du Soleil show in all the good ways: dazzling tricks and feats of strength, accompanied by a live band performing world music mashups, and interwoven with some old-fashioned clowning."

== Filmography ==
A Thrilling Ride through Koozå was the first film release related to Cirque du Soleil's show, Koozå. This short documentary was directed by Roger Cantin and released in September 2007. It was shot on location in Montréal, Canada.

Cirque du Soleil released a film production of Koozå in September 2008. The film was directed by Mario Janelle and produced by Jacques Méthé. It was shot using eight high-definition cameras on location in Toronto, Canada.

== Incidents ==
Due to the 2011 Tōhoku earthquake and tsunami, the artists and staff of Koozå were temporarily relocated to Macau where they continued training at Cirque du Soleil's resident show Zaia. The major benefit of relocating there is that the team can partner with the crews of Zed (which was also relocated from Japan) and Zaia at the Macau training facilities. Artists were also able to connect with artists from The House of Dancing Water, the water-based show at The City of Dreams by former Cirque du Soleil director Franco Dragone. Shows running from March 11 through April 9 were cancelled. The troupe returned and started performances again after facility management had conducted a thorough safety inspection.

On 27 November 2016, gymnast Lisa Skinner suffered a fractured neck and broken arm during a solo aerial hoop performance in Brisbane, Australia.

On 24 August 2024, Russian aerialist Mariia Konfektova was hospitalized after a fall during a solo aerial hoop performance in Portland, Oregon.
