= Wintuk =

Cirque du Soleil production

- Logo for Cirque du Soleil's Wintuk
- Company: Cirque du Soleil
- Genre: Contemporary circus
- Show type: Seasonal residency production
- Date of premiere: November 7, 2007
- Final show: January 2, 2011
- Location: Madison Square Garden, New York

Creative team
- Writer and director: Richard Blackburn
- Director of creation: Fernand Rainville
- Set/props designer: Patricia Ruel
- Composer: Simon Carpentier
- Costume designer: François Barbeau
- Sound designers: Jonathan Deans; Leon Rothenberg
- Lighting designer: Yves Aucoin
- Choreographer: Catherine Archambault
- Projections designer: Francis Laporte
- Acrobatic performance designer: Daniel Cola
- Acrobatic equipment and rigging designer: Guy St-Amour
- Makeup designer: Eleni Uranis

Other information
- Preceded by: Koozå (2007)
- Succeeded by: Zaia (2008)
- Official website

Wintuk (pronounced win-took; amalgamating the English word "winter" with Inupiaq phonetics) was a semi-permanent and seasonal residency show created by Cirque du Soleil. Wintuk played seasonally from 2007 to 2011 at the former WaMu Theater at Madison Square Garden (now the Hulu Theater) entertainment complex in New York.

The show ran for ten weeks each winter holiday season during the 2007 to 2011 period. Previews of Wintuk began November 1, 2007 and the world premiere and inaugural season was launched on November 7, 2007. Wintuk was a 90-minute show with a 20-minute intermission. Its initial premier season ran from November 7, 2007 to January 6, 2008. It returned for three more engagements with the final season running from November 17, 2010 through January 2, 2011.

== Storyline ==
A young boy named Jamie lives in a city that has entered the season of winter. Although the season has brought ice, long shadows and intense cold, the most important arrival has not come: there is no snow.

Jamie takes it on himself to try to discover what has caused this. On his quest, he interacts with a variety of characters - ranging from high-energy urban street characters, to giant dogs, to talking marionettes. He is also joined by the shy man known as Wimpy, the playful young girl known as Shadowgirl, and a lost Shaman.

This adventure brings the characters to an imaginary arctic world known as Wintuk – an environment without sunlight. Jamie and his friends find themselves surrounded by giant ice creatures and the People of the North. When the sun finally returns to Wintuk, Jamie and his friends are transported home, flying on the back of a giant crane. This generates a snowstorm, and snow finally falls on the town.

== Cast ==
- Jamie: Is a bright, optimistic and open-minded young boy with a boundless sense of curiosity. Jamie has the rare ability to understand the language of the puppet lampposts and dogs in the world of Wintuk.
- Shadow Girl: Is a mysterious, playful young girl who appears in the form of a shadow. She finds it quite amusing to annoy Jamie with silly games. When a sunbeam finally sets her free from her shadow, she joins Jamie on his quest to recover snow.
- Wimpy: A shy young man, Wimpy is scared of many things, including his shadow. However, it is destined that he will discover his courage, and he joins Jamie on his pursuit for snow.
- The Shaman: The homeless woman living in the city with her dogs is actually The Shaman. She is known to have great powers, including being able to summon the moon. After Jamie convinces the Shaman to help him in his quest, she finally reconnects with her own identity.
- The People of the North: Under the eye of their High Priestess, the impervious and cold People of the North are swift and agile. They welcome the Shaman and her dogs back to their icy homeland, and also aid Jamie on his quest.
- The Puppets: Throughout Wintuk, puppets are found, ranging from lampposts that help Jamie on his quest to the fantastic ice giants.

== Acts ==
- Aerial straps: Two artists perform an aerial straps act.
- Charivari: A group of skateboarders, inline skaters and trail bike riders take the stage, demonstrating technical twists, acrobatic turns and one-wheel spins.
- Cyr wheel: Two artists (Mikalai Liubezny and Valerie Inertie) representing the People of the North spin and roll across the stage inside six-and-a-half-foot-wide metallic rings.
- Hoops: With the extreme flexibility, the artist (Elena Lev) performs a hoops act, by combining contortion and hula-hooping moves.
- Inner tubes: In their icy cold homeland, the People of the North make a buoyant entrance as they bounce up and down on inner tubes.
- Juggling: The gigantic dogs spot a man whom they try to include into their game. The dogs bring the artist various items for him to juggle, resulting in a high-speed act.
- Rola bola: In an attempt to turn a light back on, an acrobat performs a balancing act using the props his coworkers toss him—pipes, panels, boards and globes.
- Rag doll: A life-size rag doll tumbles out of a strange package. A thief and a businessman fight over the seemingly lifeless toy, spinning it around and bending it into impossible positions.
- Russian bars: The traditional Russian bar act (Mikalai Liubezny, Dzianis Maskalenka, Oleg Sharipov, Ruslan Coda, Darin Good, Sergei Samoded, Svetlana Suvorova, Pavlov Yurii, Dmitrii Murashev, Dmitrii Kovganov) is performed with a twist: the flyers maintain a horizontal position, rather than a standing position, while they are 'bounced' on the bars.
- Slackrope: Standing on a village clothesline, an equilibrist ascends high above the stage. Supported by a half-inch rope, a series of striking moves and about-turns is performed. This act was performed by Jamie Adkins in the first three seasons and a modified version was performed by Chris Pettersen in the fourth and final season.
- Swiss balls: A duo of acrobatic clowns known as "Les Vitaminés" springs into action to present a high-energy act in which they bounce up and down on Swiss balls like springs.

== Music ==
The music of Wintuk was composed by Simon Carpentier, who also composed the music of Cirque du Soleil's 2003 production Zumanity. Cirque du Soleil released a studio album based on the show's original score on November 1, 2007. The tracks are listed below.

1. Something's Missing
2. Shadows
3. Beyond the Clouds
4. Dogs will be Dogs!
5. He's Scared of His Shadow
6. Norah Knows
7. Heading North
8. Back Where We Belong
9. Northern Folk
10. Elena
11. Ice Giants
12. Dolce Luce
13. Tundra Ballet
14. We Want to See it Snow
15. Nothing's Missing
16. Snowstorm
