= Mystère (Cirque du Soleil) =

Cirque du Soleil show which premiered in 1993

Coordinates: 36°07′30″N 115°10′19″W

- Logo for Cirque du Soleil's Mystère
- Company: Cirque du Soleil
- Genre: Contemporary circus
- Show type: Resident show
- Date of premiere: December 25, 1993
- Location: Treasure Island, Las Vegas Strip, Paradise, Nevada

Creative team
- Director: Franco Dragone
- Director of creation: Gilles Ste-Croix
- Composers: René Dupéré; Benoît Jutras
- Costume designer: Dominique Lemieux
- Set designer: Michel Crête
- Choreographer: Debra Brown
- Lighting designer: Luc Lafortune
- Sound designer: Jonathan Deans
- Make-up designer: Nathalie Gagné
- Senior artistic director: James Hadley
- Artistic director: 1995-2001 Pavel Brun, 2001 and on - Sandi Croft
- Aerial cube act creator: Mikhail Matorin
- Aerial high bar act creators: Andrei Lev, Pavel Brun

Other information
- Preceded by: Saltimbanco (1992)
- Succeeded by: Alegría (1994)
- Official website

Mystère (French: [mis.tɛʁ], mee-STAIR, "mystery") is a resident Cirque du Soleil show in Las Vegas, Nevada. Held in a custom theatre at the Treasure Island Hotel and Casino, the show was first performed on 25 December 1993, making it the company's longest-running show and the oldest one still active. As with many Cirque du Soleil productions, Mystère features a mixture of circus skills, dance, elaborate sets, opera, worldbeat music, and street theatre-style comedy. Featuring a musical score composed by René Dupéré and Benoît Jutras, the show was created under the direction of Franco Dragone.

== History ==
The idea for Mystère started around 1990. It was originally planned for Caesars Palace with a theme based on Greek and Roman mythology. The plan, however, was scrapped by the casino executives, who thought the project would be too financially risky. Mystère was very different from the typical material they were used to in a Las Vegas show. According to Mystère set designer Michel Crête, "Vegas... was still very influenced by Folies Bergère, with the scarves, feather boas, etc. There was a European culture already in place, oddly enough, not an American one. The people who opened the door for something new were Siegfried and Roy. They were the first to move away from the Folies Bergère thing."

Treasure Island picked up the show three years later. Mystère was the first Cirque du Soleil show that would have its own theater, rather than touring with a circus tent. Mystère would have a permanent base in Las Vegas. They worked with The Mirage hotel to produce a show.

Recent milestones Mystère has achieved include:

- Mystère celebrated their 20th anniversary on 25 December 2013
- Mystère celebrated their 10,000th show on 27 December 2014.
- Mystère celebrated their 11,111th show on 17 May 2017.
- Mystére celebrated their 30th anniversary on 25 December 2023

== Set and technical information ==
The theater is a unique theater built in the Treasure Island Hotel and Casino specifically for the show. The design of the theater was created by Michel Crête and that of Montreal-based team of Scéno Plus. This theater seats 1,541 audience members. The stage measures 120 feet by 70 feet deep and covers approximately 10,032 square feet. The stage floor is made of a layer of Base Mat, which is rubber made from recycled old tires and sneakers. This helps give the stage some bounce for tumbling. This is held together by polyurethane adhesive and covered with thousands of gallons of liquid that dries onto the surface. The Downstage D Lift is 36 feet in diameter and includes a 28-foot revolving stage. The revolving stage rotates up to 10 revolutions per minute. Props, equipment, and performers are elevated to stage level from the basement or trap by four moving lifts. These moving lifts were constructed in Montreal and then assembled in Las Vegas, NV.

The snail seen growing larger throughout the show is called Alice. By the end of the show, she is a giant inflatable puppet controlled by four puppeteers from the inside. The puppeteers move her around by following markings on the floor, since they can not see outside the puppet. They also control her eyes, torso, and tail.

The taiko drums in Mystère are created by the Japanese company Asano Taiko, located in Mattō, Ishikawa Prefecture. The largest drum in Mystère is the ōdaiko, which is 6 feet (1.8 m) in diameter and 15 feet (4.6 m) in length, and weighs half a ton. Due to the large size of the drum, it had to be brought into the theatre during construction. Since the completion of the theatre the drum cannot be removed, as no door is large enough to accommodate it.

== Characters ==
The cast of Mystère comprises a myriad of fantastic and mysterious characters.

- Inti X & Y (Spermatos/Spermatites): A comic chorus representing the seeds of life.
- Red Bird: Convinced he can fly. His brilliant appearance and acrobatic skills snap up the energy of the show like sparks that fly in the wind.
- Les Laquais: The "lackeys" of Mystère who serve and support others. They perform in the Korean plank act.
- Brian Le Petit: A troublemaker who steals people's popcorn and causes chaos both onstage and off, he was originally created and performed by Brian Dewhurst and later by Eligiusz Skoczylas, Darren Pitura and Jimmy Slonina. (2000–present)
- Chanteuses Plumes: A duo of muses who sing the emotion of all humans.
- The Firebirds: Along with the Double Faces, they perform the Chinese pole act.
- Les Bébés: Two enormous babies on a quest for nourishment. There's Big Baby (also known as Bébé François) and the Baby Girl. There was a third baby for a short period, similar to Francois, who was a part of the original 1993 cast, until his eventual removal in Mid-1994. All the babies carried some object of their own: Big Baby carried a red ball, Baby girl carried a miniature Alice and the third baby that lasted from 1993 to 1994 carried a puppet of Tony, who came to life as a performer.
- La Vache à lait: Protector of youth and a symbol of fertility. When he sounds his horn, it heralds a new beginning.
- Moha-Samedi: A man dressed in a magenta-red suit, named after the first day of the new millennium. He is the narrator no one listens to, he was originally portrayed by Canadian actor Paul Ahmarani and later by Lorenzo Pisoni and Nicky Dewhurst.
- La Belle: Afraid of ugliness, she seeks to avoid pain at all costs.
- Black Widow: The antithesis of La Belle. She represents a praying mantis who destroys the illusions and dreams of her victims. Originally portrayed by Katie Renauld.
- Birds of Prey: These unpredictable birds soar and fly throughout the world of Mystère. They are graceful, yet aggressive when hungry. Originally portrayed by Lejdka Zievert and Mark Ward
- The Frog: Creepy characters witness to the strength of birth and time.
- Les Valseuses: Ghostly figures twirling around themselves accompanying the appearance of the Dome.
- The Green Lizards: Mischievous and skittish chameleons. There is the Male Chameleon and the Female Chameleon (who are not present in the show anymore). The Male Chameleon was originally portrayed by Karl Baumann
- Double Faces: These two-faced creatures perform in the Chinese pole act. Also known as The Asticots, each one is a segment of the whole and would die if alone. Their double face hides the corruption of their state.
- Les Palmiers: Out of a purple-blue mist, these tropical ladies float by.
- Deus ex machina: The machine that regulates the existence of everything.
- The Tribe (Les Pagnes): The primitive, tragic ghosts of modern humanity. They descend from the skies to provide the earthly beat of our journey. They welcome us, and they bid us farewell. They perform in Taïko.
- Monarch Bird: A male bird introduced in 2022 as backup dancing character.
- The Prince of the Darkness: The prince of the dark side of Mystère, performed by Miguel Godreau; he would perform in the show, but never participate in the premiere due to complications from HIV.
- Zucchini: A yellow creature with a large, bulbous head that performed with some artists from 1993 to 1995; no longer in the show. originally appeared on the Net-Up set, before Flying Trapeze.
- The Shaman: A mysterious man who creates the sounds of the world; no longer in the show. Originally portrayed by Luis Perez
- Bungee Warriors: A duo of muscle men able to fly in the air.
- The Jugglers: A trio of jugglers that performed the Manipulation act from 1993 to 1995; no longer in the show.
- The Cube Man: Exhibiting great strength and courage, he captures the attention of young souls in search of wonder.; no longer in the show.
- The Mountain Man: An archangel who is ready to sacrifice everything. Originally known as Gabriel.
- Mephisto and Vénus: Part of the Giants race, they are thwarted, twisted creatures. Their presence wreaks havoc in any domain. Together they want to create chaos and destroy the balance that exists within the world of Mystère.
- The Giants: A gentle race with feathers and long legs. There's the happy-go-lucky Pumpkin Giant, the grumpy Fly Giant, the magnificent Giraffe Giant, the beautiful Plume Giant (no longer in the show) and the Egg Giant, a delicate interior inside a protective shell.
- The Yellow Bird: A kind of playful dwarf. Performs handbalancing since 1998. Originally played by Stanislav Greyner, and later Sebastian Coin.
- The Medusa: A long-appendaged creature that was part of. the original cast between 1993 and 1995; no longer in the show. Appeared among the smoke and disappeared among the shadows, performed during the Net-Set Up.
- The Wheel Rider: A character who performed the German Wheel act from 1995 to 1997; no longer in the show.
- The Green Man: A curly-horned creature similar to a Satyr that was part of the cast from a short period in 1997, no longer in the show. Originally portrayed by Guennadi Tchijov, who joined the show after Saltimbanco had ended in 1997. After the announcement of Saltimbanco's return a year later, Tchijov left, and Sebastian Coin took his place and reprised the role of Yellow Bird in the Handbalancing act, which he still performs today.
- The Toy: A living doll who was from the third baby and magically came to life as a performer. He was the original Handbalancer of the Chinese Poles act that was part of the original cast between 1993 and 1995. Originally portrayed by Tony Manducas; no longer in the show.
- Egon Egli: A strange, lanky, bespectacled youth who would get into childish antics during the performance. No longer in the show. Originally portrayed by Reinier Groustra
- The Giants Zucchinis: Two inflatable marionettes only used in the Net Set-up for the original trapeze act; no longer in the show.
- La Grosse: An egg-like character who appeared sometimes during the Overture and Bungee acts from 1993 to 1995; no longer in the show. Originally portrayed by Jean François Rogemont.
- Alice the Escargot: An enormous snail. Born from a spring rain, carrier of the souls of the ancestors and herald of the future.
- The Bungees: Like majestic birds in flight, the Bungees dive fearlessly through the air, creating images of unison and separation.
- Benny Le Grand: Mystère's original clown, who was a bitter old man, often mocking the show and disrupting it with his dangerous antics. (1993 - 1995, 1996 - 2000)
- Alex El Sobrino: Benny Le Grand's Spanish nephew. (1998 - 2000)
- Alfredo et Adrenaline: A comedic duo of clowns who had previously appeared in Le Cirque Reinventé's European tour, and the special Zirkus Knie show. (1995 - 1996)
- Lucky: A Pyrotechnic obsessed clown who briefly replaced Benny Le Grand. He was a somewhat absent minded character modeled after Vaudevillian performers like Buster Keaton and Harold Lloyd that often got into surreally comical situations. Originally portrayed by Jonah Logan. (1997)

== Acts ==
Mystère features several acrobatic acts, supplemented by clown acts and transitional scenes that advance the storyline.

- Prologue (1993 - present)
- Bébé: Bébé François plays with a big red ball. (1993 - present)
- Aerial Straps Duo: A pair of aerialists performs twists and turns as they fly over the stage. (2017 - present)
- Chinese Poles and Hand Balancing: A group of acrobats climb up, jump between, and slide down four adjacent metal poles while an acrobat contorts into poses on two balancing canes on a platform above the Chinese poles. (2012 - present)
- Photograph: Brian Le Petit tries to take pictures despite the strict rules. (2000 - present)
- Bottle: Bébé François appears from an opening high up in the corner of the stage. (1993 - present)
- Hand-to-Hand: Two artists perform an exhibition of strength and stamina on a rotating dome. (1993 - present)
- Bungee: A group of artists bounce and swing from the ceiling to the ground and back on bungees. (1993 - present)
- Teeterboard and Power Track: Artists perform a combination of these two skills. (2017 - present)
- Dei Ex Machina (Contemporary Dance): The time has arrived for the dark side of Mystère, as ominous clanging and industrial noises beckon Mephisto to rise from the depths, exposing a mysterious crate. (1993 - Present)
- The Box Trick: Benny Le Grand/Brian Le Petit attempts to perform a magic trick with a large crate, but ends up causing chaos. (1993 - 1995, 1996 - present)
- Flying trapeze: Unlike the original version where two separate trapeze towers were surrounded by a platform on one side and an aerial cradle on the other, the current version has a platform on either side. Each trapeze tower now has two trapeze bars swinging beside each other. The act and music were originally from Zed (a resident show at Tokyo Disney Resort) which closed in 2011. (2012 - present)
- Taiko: A group of artists perform powerful rhythms on Japanese taiko drums. (1993 - present)
- Epilogue: With an upbeat, hand-clapping, celebratory number, the entire cast circles the stage. You can see pride in their faces as they reveal their true identities. (1993 - present)

=== Reserve acts ===
- Solo Straps: On reserve for the Aerial Straps duo; features a single artist on straps with the Black Widow or La Belle performing choreography on stage. (1993 - 1995, 2000 - present)
- Aerial Silk: With the classic soundtrack of Birimbau, the Aerial Silk act is full of energy mixed with breathtaking spins and amazing balance. (Main: 2012 - 2018, 2023 - 2024) (Réserve: 2021 - 2023, 2024 - Present)

=== Retired acts ===
- Manipulation: Created by Michael Moschen, three performers used warped metal sheets to juggle and manipulate balls. (1993 - 1995)
- Flying Trapeze: With flashy, colorful costumes and an unwavering spirit to fly, these birds of prey took to the skies in a phenomenal act. (1993 - 1995)
- German Wheel: In a special act performed for a short time by Wolfgang Bientzle, an artist inside of a giant wheel would perform tricks, manipulated by shifting their center of gravity. (1995 - 1997)
- Dual High Bar: The pendulum movement of the High Bar flyers emphasize that time continues but never stops passing. The benefits outweigh the risks, for the adventure is the reward. (1995 - 2012)
- Flying Man in Silk: Strong yet sensitive, powerful yet delicate, natural but surreal, the Flying Man emerges from the shadows, showing his force for more subtle art, evoking sensual men's movement, and the live stream on silk. (1997)
- Aerial Cube: Originally created and performed by Mikhail "Misha" Matorin, and later Paul Bowler. An artist performed with the metal skeleton of a large cube on the ground and in the air. (1995 - 1996, 1998 - 2015)
- Chinese Poles: Squirming up and down the poles, like sprouting vines, the Double Faces are a symbol of organic life, which feeds on itself and grows. (1993 - 2011)
- Trampoline, Fast Track, and Korean plank/Teeterboard: This act signifies organized human society, productivity, play and brotherhood with the entire team working as a unit. (1993 - 2017)
- The Tour Guide: Benny Le Grand interrupts the show as an impromptu tour guide. (1996 - 2000)
- The Mime: Alfredo tries to perform a traditional mime number, but is harassed by Adrenaline. (1995 - 1996)
- Le Dégât/The Damage: Alfredo and Adrenaline try to perform music, but ends up escalating into a full blown paint war. (1995 - 1996)
- Pogo: Lucky gets tangled up in a shoddily made Pogo Stick. (1997)
- Dog: Lucky gets chained to a fire-breathing Dog House. (1997)
- Papa: Bébé François dresses up his "Papa" to look like him, and the two of them end up squirting the audience with Water guns. (1996 - 2000)

=== Acts used in the film Cirque du Soleil: Journey of Man (2000) ===
- Taiko
- Aerial cube
- Aerial straps

=== Acts used in the film Cirque du Soleil: Worlds Away (2012) ===
- Aerial cube

== Costumes ==
Dominique Lemieux took inspiration from nature to create the colorful costumes of Mystère. One such costume is the Firebird, which has red feathers and accents that give the impression of embers flying through the air. The odd-looking Spermatos and Spermatites are dressed in elongated costumes which bulge in the center and have a tendril-like feature on the head. To give the characters an organic nature, spandex/lycra was used in conjunction with fringes and borders.

== Music ==
The original score of Mystère was composed by René Dupéré, who had composed all of Cirque du Soleil's earlier shows, including Nouvelle Expérience and Saltimbanco. In 1994 the show's music was released as a studio album featuring the vocals of Canadian singers Élise Gouin (now known as Élise Velle) and Nathalie Gauvin.

In 1995 the show underwent an artistic overhaul, including changes in the lineup of acts. The "Manipulation" act was replaced by the "Aerial Cube", the Flying Trapeze act by the Aerial High Bars (the Flying Trapeze returned in 2012), and the Acro Net setup dance act was excluded from the show. At the same time the musical score was renovated with assistance from Benoît Jutras, a longtime music director and arranger for Cirque who later went on to compose for Quidam and other Cirque shows. The result, captured in the album Mystère: Live in Las Vegas, was a score that reflects the diverse compositional styles of both composers. Mystère: Live in Las Vegas is a live, in-house recording of the new score, featuring Nathalie Gauvin and Wendy Talley on vocals; the album was released on November 12, 1996. After the release of the live album, the music was rearranged and altered once again. While the album resembles the current live music closely, it is not identical. For the celebration of the 25th anniversary of the show in 2018, a vinyl album specifically dedicated to the employees was created in limited quantities, just as it was done for the show Alegria in 1994 and Saltimbanco in 1997.

Below are the track lists for the 1994, 1996 and 2018 Mystère soundtrack albums. Acts are listed next to the songs they have accompanied in the show.

1994 studio album

1. Égypte (Chinese poles intro)
2. Rumeurs (Manipulation, 1993 - 1995)
3. Birimbau (Flying Trapeze, (1993 - 1995), Aerial Silk (2024 - present) )
4. Kunya Sobé (Bungee pt. 2 (1993 - 2012, 2018–2022), complete Bungee act (2012–2017) )
5. En Ville (Trampoline, Fast track/Power track, Korean plank/Teeterboard (1993 - 2016) )
6. Ulysse (Hand-to-hand (1993 - present), Main à Main (1993 - 1995; 1996 - 1998), Solo Aerial Straps (1994) )
7. Rondo (Chinese poles and Handbalancing)
8. Caravena (Interlude (Set Up for Flying Trapeze), (1993 - 1995) )
9. Kalimando (Aerial silk (2012 - 2017), Bungee pt. 1 (1993 - 2012, 2018 - present) )
Further information: Cirque du Soleil discography § Mystère

1996 live album (Live in Las Vegas)

1. Ouverture/Ramsani (Opening, (1993 - present) )
2. Misha (Aerial cube (1996 - 2015), Solo Aerial Straps (2002 - 2015), Flying Man in Silk (1997), Duo Aerial Straps (2018 - Present), Aerial Silk (2021 - 2023) )
3. Égypte (Chinese poles intro, (1993 - present) )
4. Rondo/Double Face (Chinese poles and Handbalancing (1993 - present) )
5. Ulysse (Hand-to-Hand (1993–present) Main à Main (1993 - 1995; 1996 - 1998) Solo Aerial Straps (1994) )
6. Dôme (Interlude from Hand-to-Hand)
7. Kalimando (Aerial silk (2012 – 2017), Bungee pt. 1 (1993 - 2012, 2018–present) )
8. Kunya Sobé (Bungee pt. 2 (1993 - 2012, 2018 - 2022), complete Bungee act (2012 - 2017) )
9. En Ville/Frisco (Trampoline (1993 - 2016), Fast Track/Power Track, Korean Plank/Teeterboard (1993 - 2017) )
10. Gambade (Finale interlude (1993 - 1995) Dance interlude and Dei ex Machina (1993 - 2017) )
11. High Bar (Dual High Bar (1996 - 2010), Intro to Dual High Bar (2010 - 2012) )
12. Taïko (Taiko drumming)
13. Finale (Finale, 1996 - Present)

2018 vinyl live album (twenty-five LIVE)

1. Ouverture/Ramsani (Opening, (1993 - present) )
2. Misha (Duo Aerial Straps, (2018 - present) )
3. Égypte (Chinese poles intro (1993 - present) )
4. Rondo/Double Face (Chinese poles and Handbalancing (1993 - present) )
5. Ulysse (Hand-to-hand (1993 – present), Main à Main (1993 - 1995; 1996 - 1998), Solo Aerial Straps (1994) )
6. Dôme (Interlude from Hand-to-Hand)
7. Kalimando (Aerial silk (2012 – 2017), Bungee pt. 1 (1993 - 2012, 2018–present) )
8. Kunya Sobé (Bungee pt. 2 (1993 - 2012, 2018 - 2022), complete Bungee act (2012 - 2017) )
9. Convergence (Teeterboard and Power track (2017 – present) )
10. Rogue (Planche Dance interlude and Dei ex Machina (2017–present) )
11. Fiesta (originally from Zed) (Flying Trapeze, 2012–present)
12. Strike of the Net (Set-Up to Taiko drumming)
13. Finale (Finale, 1996 - Present)

Songs not appearing on either album:

- Alice (Ending, (1993 - 1995). Updated version of song right after "Finale," (1995 - present) )
- Benny/Klezmer (Clown act, (1996 – present) )
- Mime (Clown act, (1995 - 1996) )
- Bolero (Clown act, (1995 - 1996) )
- Benny Le Grand/Wayne (Clown act, (1993 - 1995) )
- Disco-clown (Clown act, (2001 - 2021) )
- Mist (Intro to Hand-to-Hand, (1995 - 1997) )
- Cercles (German Wheel, (1995 - 1997) )
- High Bar II (Dual high bar, (2010 - 2012) )
- Avos (Bungee, (2022 - Present) )
- Carnaval Ver. I (Interlude (1993 – 2022) )
- Carnaval Ver. II (Interlude (2022 – present) )
- Big City (Intro to Trampoline (1993 - 2016), Fast Track/Power Track, Korean Plank/Teeterboard (1993 - 2017) )
- Hell/Angel (Dei ex machina, (1993 – present) )
- Rampant (Chineses poles Exit)
- Nouvel Envol (Aerial cube, 2015 - 2017) (Solo Aerial Straps, 2015–present) (Duo Aerial Straps, 2017 - 2018)
- Love Over (Duo Aerial Straps, (2018 - present) )

Vocalists

Singer 1

- Nathalie Gauvin: Dec 1993 - Dec 2005
- Jeannette D' Armand: 2000 (temporarily replaced Nathalie Gauvin)
- Mirjana Milovanovic: Jan 2006 - Jul 2007
- Sarah Boucher: Jul 2007 - Sep 2009
- Silje Marie Norderhaugh: Sep 2009 - Jan 2013
- Anna Bille: Jan 2013 - Dec 2014, Oct 2017
- Kailee Ann: Dec 2014 - Aug 2017
- Mackenzie Thomas: April 2018 - Present

Singer 2

- Elise "Gouin" Velle: Dec 1993 - Sep 1994
- Wendy Talley: Sep 1994 - Dec 1997, 1998 (temporarily replaced Chantal Hamel)
- Chantal Hamel: Dec 1997 - Jul 1999
- Stacey Beth Sanford: Jul 1999 - Dec 2000
- Dina Emerson: Jan 2001 - Jan 2002, Apr 2007 - Jun 2017
- Rochelle Collins: Jan 2002 - Jul 2003, Oct 2003 - May 2007
- Briana Rossi: Jun 2017 - July 2021
- Brittany Avey: July 2021 - Present

Singer 3

- Luis Perez: Dec 1993 - Jul 1996

== In popular culture ==
- Mystère was a featured guest performance on Lopez Tonight, airing December 20, 2010. The featured acts included the hand-to-hand and aerial cube acts.
- In the film Knocked Up, the main characters watched Mystère.
- In the webseries Dorm Life, the character Courtney Cloverlock, a huge Cirque du Soleil fan, has posters of both Mystère and Love by her bed.
- Yuji Naka, creator of the video game Nights into Dreams…, has cited Mystère as an inspiration for the game.
- Mystère did a performance collaboration with alternative rock band Imagine Dragons for the Life is Beautiful Festival.
