= Hand to hand =

Hand to hand might mean

- Hand-to-hand combat, a fighting discipline
- Hand to hand acrobatics, a balancing skill
- Hand to Hand (album), 1980 jazz album
- Hand-to-hand, a combat sport
