= Saltimbanco =

Touring show by Cirque du Soleil

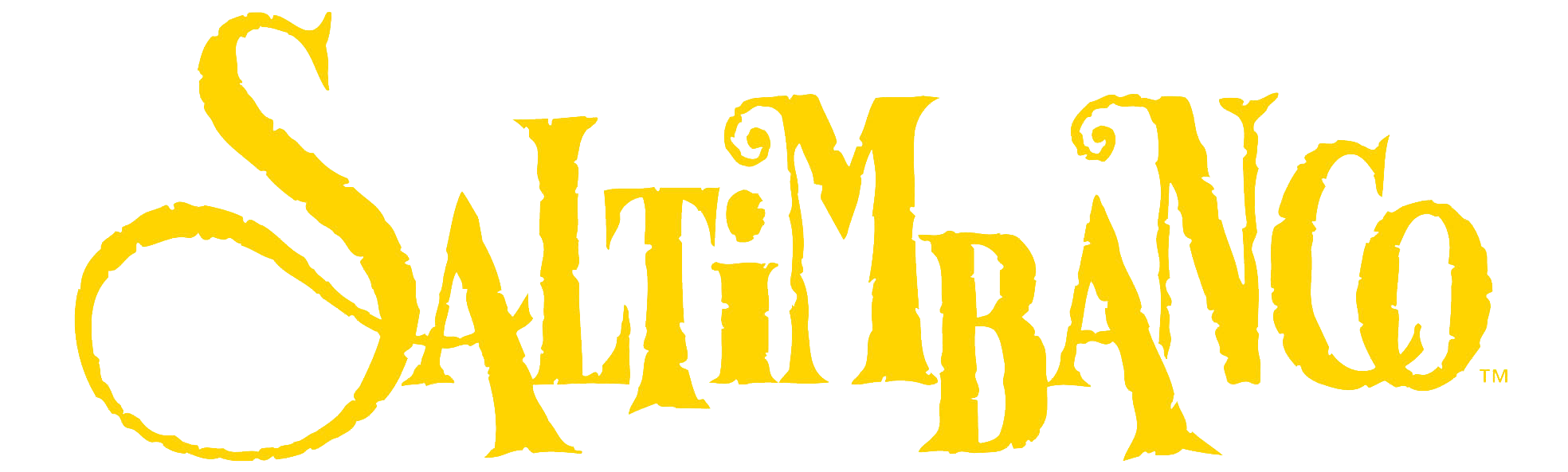
- Logo for Cirque du Soleil's Saltimbanco
- Company: Cirque du Soleil
- Genre: Contemporary circus
- Show type: Touring tent show (1992–2006); touring arena show (2007–2012)
- Date of premiere: April 23, 1992 (Montreal)
- Final show: December 30, 2012 (Montréal)

Creative team
- Director: Franco Dragone
- Director of creation: Gilles Ste-Croix (1992); Carmen Ruest (2007)
- Composer: René Dupéré
- Costume designer: Dominique Lemieux
- Set designer: Michel Crête
- Choreographer: Debra Brown (1992); Hélène Lemay (2007)
- Lighting designer: Luc Lafortune
- Sound designer: Jonathan Deans (1992); François Desjardins (2007)
- Make-up designer: Nathalie Gagné (2007)
- Mask designer: André Hénault (1992)
- Clown act creator and acting consultant: René Bazinet (2007)
- Production manager: Pierre Guillotte (2007)
- Musical Director, Guitars: Francois Dumais (1999), (1992)

Other information
- Preceded by: Nouvelle Expérience (1990)
- Succeeded by: Mystère (1993)
- Official website

Saltimbanco was a touring show by Cirque du Soleil. Saltimbanco ran from 1992 to 2006 in its original form, performed under a large circus tent called the Grand Chapiteau; its last performance in that form was in Rio de Janeiro, Brazil, on December 10, 2006. A new adaptation of the show started touring North America on July 31, 2007, with its first stop in London, Ontario, Canada. The new version was staged in arenas with fewer performances in each city it visited. The new version closed at the end of 2012.

The show was described by Cirque du Soleil as a celebration of life. Its creators say they developed it as an antidote to the violence and despair prevalent in the 20th century.

== Etymology ==
English has lost the word saltimbank from current usage; but it is still familiar in Spanish, Portuguese and Italian as saltimbanco, and in French as saltimbanque, meaning street acrobat or entertainer. According to the company's site, the word "saltimbanco" comes from the Italian "saltare in banco", which means "to jump on a bench." The etymology of the word reflects its acrobatic associations. A salto means a jump in Italian; banco in this connection is a trestle holding a board, set up as a temporary stage for open-air performers. 'Saltimbanchi' were thus those who performed somersaults on a temporary platform—wandering acrobats, performing as buskers in the open air, the platform giving their audience a better view.

== History ==
Saltimbanco was Cirque du Soleil's longest running production when it closed at the end of 2012. In 2011 it was the first show by Cirque du Soleil to be presented in Turkey, and Ukraine, in 2012 the first show in Slovakia and in Amman, Jordan. Saltimbanco's last performance took place in Montreal on December 30, 2012 after 6,000 big top and arena appearances before 14 million spectators in 200 cities worldwide.

== Set and technical information ==
Saltimbanco's set played on opposites and contradictions located within a cityscape. A rosace made of metal rings suspended over the stage allowed light to filter through like leaves on a tree. The lighting was cinematic in effect due to the usage of different colored gels. The facts listed below applied to the arena format of Saltimbanco, although some of these were also applicable to the grand chapiteau tour as well.

- The stage was 110 feet (34 m) in length and 65 feet (20 m) in width.
- The Chinese poles were 24 feet (7.3 m) in height.
- The equipment for the show weighed a total of 180 tonnes (180 long tons; 200 short tons) and was transported and configured by 26 specialty technicians and 12 truck drivers.
- Approximately 140 people were hired locally in each city to set up and load out the show for the arena.

== Cast ==
The 51-member performance troupe included multiple musicians, singers, acrobats, and characters. Characters included:

- The Urban Worms
- The Multicolored Worms
- The Cavaliers
- The Baroques
- The Death
- The Ringmaster
- The Baron
- The Dreamer
- The Punks
- The Songbird (La Belle)
- The Blue Gypsy
- The Child
- Eddie
- The Angels

The cast has featured numerous performers over the years including René Bazinet, Frédéric Volovitch and Andrea Conway.

== Acts ==
The acts in Saltimbanco were a mix of traditional circus acts with more modern acts.

- Adagio trio: Three acrobats performed in an adagio that drew inspiration from acrosport.
- Chinese poles: Up to 26 performers performed in this act using four 25-foot-tall (7.6 m) poles in the middle of the stage. They climbed up, dropped down, jumped between, hung from, and even spun on these poles.
- Balancing on canes: A handbalance artist performed feats of strength and various contortion poses, including the Marinelli bend, while balancing on high handstand supports.
- Juggling: A juggler used multiple balls in a display of increasing dexterity.
- Boleadoras: Two performers twirled boleadoras in this unique act. The bolas are a percussion instrument that is hit against the ground to produce a loud popping sound. The act later included the use of the Taiko by one of the performers while the other used the bolas to play a complementary beat.
- Russian swing: Multiple artists jumped off a large swing, performing twists, spins, and flips, before landing on human pyramids, a mat, and other props.
- Solo trapeze: A young artist swung a trapeze incredibly high, whenever the trapeze was swung high the artist would spin up multiple times, and would catch the bar of the trapeze with her legs.
- Hand-to-hand: A duo used an incredible amount of body strength in this act as one would balance in a handstand on the other.
- Bungee: Four aerialists suspended from bungees flipped, swung, and bounced in synchronization with each other.

=== Rotational acts ===
- Aerial straps: A performer swung on these straps and would use upper body strength to create many dangerous poses.

=== Retired acts ===
- Tight rope (double wire): An acrobat ascended a wire as two more tightropes, one three feet higher than the other, were revealed. She performed various tricks including flips, spins, and splits. She even backflipped from one rope to the other, and then jumped back. This act was removed from the arena version due to rigging issues.
- Contortion: This act featured four female contortionists from a previous Cirque du Soleil show, Nouvelle Expérience. It replaced the Boleadoras act for several years, but did not continue after the 1998 revival.
- Diabolo: This was a solo diabolo act using Western-style diabolo tricks.
- Vertical rope: This was one of the original Saltimbanco acts, a Spanish web act originally performed by the adagio troupe. This act was not seen outside of the North America/Japan tour.
- Manipulation: This act featured three women manipulating ribbons and hoops. It replaced the boleadoras act.
- Artistic bicycle: A bicycle artist wheeled around the stage, all the while playing the guitar, hand balancing, swinging and dancing on wheels.
- Duo trapeze: This act featured two female artists who would swing on a trapeze, one would leap off and would be caught at the last minute by the other performer and be brought back onto the trapeze for the next trick.

== Costumes ==
The costumes in Saltimbanco were bright and vivid in color to accentuate the dynamism of the urban city. The colors used in the costumes were all primary colors: cyan, yellow, magenta, and green. The Baron, clad in black, red, and white, wore a cape, length-arm gloves, and tights. The Multi-Colored Worms wore jumpsuits that covered everything but their faces. The Urban Worms's masks were made of a polyester resin base which was both hypoallergenic and permeable to air.

== Music ==
The original album artwork for Saltimbanco, 1992

The Saltimbanco score was written and composed by René Dupéré, and was released as a studio album on October 9, 1992. The music has a range of musical influences from the classical to the modern.

Several other limited editions of the album have been released. In 2001 Cirque du Soleil Musique released a limited edition of the original 1992 soundtrack featuring two additional tracks, "Arlequin" and "Adagio" (performed by Laur Fugere). Another limited edition of the CD, Saltimbanco Live in Amsterdam, was created and distributed exclusively to staff members of Saltimbanco. The employee special edition features a live, in-house recording of an entire performance and is considered a collector's item.

The original soundtrack features the vocal work of Canadian vocalist Francine Poitras. In 2005, Cirque du Soleil re-recorded and released the soundtrack to update its music. Some songs were completely re-recorded, while others had new instrumentation added and included Poitras's original vocal track. Additional and new vocals were provided by Laurence Janot, a French singer who was touring with the show at the time. Every track was slightly edited in some form from the original CD.

Below is the list of tracks for 1992, 1996 and 2005 re-releases alongside are the acts during which each song was performed.

1992 studio album

1. Kumbalawé (Opening pt. 2)
2. Barock (Russian swing)
3. Kazé (Double wire (1992–2006))
4. Amazonia (Duo trapeze, 1992–2011, 2011-2012)
5. Norweg (Double wire, 1992–2006)
6. Urgence (Hand to Hand)
7. Pokinoï (Vertical rope, 1992–1994), (Boleadoras transition)
8. Saltimbanco (Chinese poles)
9. Il Sogno di Volare (Bungee)
10. Horéré Ukundé (Finale)
11. Rideau (Opening pt. 1)
  - 2002 extended edition bonus tracks. Recorded in Amsterdam.
12. Adagio (Adagio Trio)
13. Arlequin (Juggling (1992-1996, 1998-2012))

1996 live album (Live in Amsterdam)

- CD 1
1. Cloche et Présentation (Introduction to the show)
2. Rideau (Opening pt. 1)
3. Kumbalawé (Opening pt. 2)
4. Adagio (Adagio Trio)
5. Saltimbanco (Chinese poles)
6. Clown (Clown acts intro)
7. Kazé/Norweg (Double wire (1992-2006))
8. Rêve (Transition)
9. Arlequin (Juggling (1992-1996, 1998-2012))
10. Rave Out (Contortion, 1995-1997); (Manipulation, 1998-2001); (Balancing on Canes, 2009-2012)
- CD 2
1. Tap Dance (Cabaret Transition, 1994-2012)
2. Barock (Russian swing)
3. Cantus/Mélopeé (Solo trapeze, 1994–2006, 2011-2012)
4. Amazonia (Duo trapeze, 1992–2011, 2011-2012)
5. Démontage Trapèze (Solo/Duo Trapeze transition) (1994-2012)
6. La Mort (Character scene)
7. Urgence (Hand to Hand)
8. Il Sogno di Volare (Bungee)
9. Transfert (Transition)
10. Horéré Ukundé (Finale)

2005 re-release

1. Kumbalawé (Opening pt. 2)
2. Saltimbanco (Chinese poles)
3. Cantus-Mélopée (Solo trapeze, 1994–2006, 2011-2012)
4. Norweg (Double wire, 1992–2006)
5. Kazé (Double wire, 1992–2006)
6. Barock (Russian swing)
7. Adagio (Adagio trio)
8. Amazonia (Duo trapeze, 1992–2011, 2011-2012)
9. Pokinoï (Vertical rope, 1992–1994), (Boleadoras transition)
10. Il Sogno Di Volare (Bungee)
11. Horéré Ukundé (Finale)
12. Rideau (Opening pt. 1)

Other songs

1. Boogaloo (Eddie's Clown acts, 1992–1997, 1998, 2000, 2004-2005)
2. Slaloom (Bicycle)
  - Diabolo (2002–2006)
  - Artistic Bycicle (2007–2011)
  - Aerial Straps (2012)
3. Darkness (Intro to Boleadoras)
4. Malamba Ver.1 (Boleadoras, 1992–1994)
5. Malamba Ver.2 (Boleadoras, 1995–2006)
6. Malamba Ver.3 (Boleadoras, 2007–2012)
7. Sax (Cabaret Transition - Russian Swing transition, 1992–1994)
8. Pocoleta (Second act intro)
9. Démontage Trapèze Ver.1 (Solo/Duo Trapeze transition) (1992-1994)

== Filmography ==
=== Saltimbanco's Diary ===
A behind-the-scenes featurette on the making of Saltimbanco.

=== Cirque du Soleil Presents: Saltimbanco ===
A television adaptation, filmed live in Atlanta in 1993 and released as a 78-minute VHS in 1994, though the show's acts continued to change significantly after it was filmed.

=== Saltimbanco 20 ans Pour Toujours / Forever 20 ===
In 2012, just before the show's retirement, a behind-the-scenes documentary was filmed, titled Saltimbanco Forever 20 (directed by Eric Chaussé; director of photography: Miguel Henriques; editor: Julie Bouffard). This documentary had thus far remained unreleased, although a short clip was leaked in October 2013. In 2014 another excerpt was leaked featuring an interview with boleadoras performer Adriana Pegueroles; another clip, about the show's music, was published in 2019. In August 2025 the full documentary was found and uploaded to the Internet Archive.

== Critical reception ==
Variety, "The show is different, but the lyricism and sense of wonder remain."

Los Angeles Times, "With the delicacy and strength of a spider’s web, Saltimbanco straddles time and place and captures the imagination as only truly great theater can do."

== Tour ==
Saltimbanco toured around the world several times during its original 14-year tour under the Grand Chapiteau. It played its final show in the Royal Albert Hall in London on 1 February 1997. Saltimbanco was revived the following year on 14 October 1998, and went on to tour the Asia-Pacific region. The show played for another nine years, becoming the first Cirque du Soleil show to tour South America, with visits to Santiago, Chile (March 2006); Buenos Aires, Argentina (May 2006); and São Paulo (August 2006) and Rio de Janeiro, Brazil (October 2006). That tour's final performance took place in Rio de Janeiro, Brazil on 10 December 2006.

Following its closure in December 2006, Saltimbanco was configured into an arena show format, and re-launched in July 2007 to commence an extensive North American tour, visiting cities and areas that Cirque du Soleil had previously been unable to visit. The tour started in London, Ontario and subsequently toured Canada and the United States. Saltimbanco’s three-year tour of North America ended in Columbus, Ohio. In 2009 the show embarked on its third tour of Europe. Between 2011 and 2012, it visited over 50 cities in South Africa, Australia, New Zealand, Asia, Eastern Europe, and North America.

Saltimbanco's final performance took place in Montreal on 30 December 2012.

Saltimbanco has been to many different regions, here is the list of all of them.

- North American Tour - (1992–1993)
- Japan Tour - (1994)
- Montreal special - (1994–1995)
- European Tour - (1995–1997)
- Ottawa special - (1998)
- Asia & Pacific Tour - (1999–2000)
- North American Tour II (pacific northwest) - (2000)
- Japan Tour II - (2001)
- European Tour II - (2002–2005)
- Mexican Tour - (2005–2006)
- South American Tour - (2006)
- North American Arena Tour - (2007–2009)
- European Tour III - (2009–2011)
- South African Tour - (2011)
- Australian Tour - (2011)
- European Tour - (2011–2012)
- Asian Middle East Tour - (2012)
- North American Arena Tour II - (2012)

The following colorboxes indicate the region of each performance:
EU Europe NA North America SA South America AP Asia/Pacific OC Oceania AF Africa

=== Arena tour ===
1996–1997, 2003, 2007–2012

==== 1996 schedule ====
EU London, UK (Royal Albert Hall)- From 5 Jan 1996 to 28 Jan 1996

==== 1997 schedule ====
EU London, UK (Royal Albert Hall) - From 2 Jan 1997 to 1 Feb 1997

==== 2003 schedule ====
EU London, UK (Royal Albert Hall)- From 7 Jan 2003 to 6 Feb 2003

==== 2007 schedule ====
- NA London, ON - From 31 Jul 2007 to 5 Aug 2007
- NA Ottawa, ON - From 8 Aug 2007 to 12 Aug 2007
- NA Halifax, NS - From 15 Aug 2007 to 19 Aug 2007
- NA St. John's, NL - From 23 Aug 2007 to 26 Aug 2007
- NA Saint John, NB - From 30 Aug 2007 to 2 Sep 2007
- NA Syracuse, NY - From 5 Sep 2007 to 9 Sep 2007
- NA Wilkes-Barre, PA - From 12 Sep 2007 to 16 Sep 2007
- NA Greensboro, NC - From 19 Sep 2007 to 23 Sep 2007
- NA State College, PA - From 26 Sep 2007 to 30 Sep 2007
- NA Norfolk, VA - From 3 Oct 2007 to 7 Oct 2007
- NA East Lansing, MI - From 10 Oct 2007 to 14 Oct 2007
- NA Peoria, IL - From 17 Oct 2007 to 18 Oct 2007
- NA Champaign, IL - From 9 Nov 2007 to 10 Nov 2007
- NA Green Bay, WI - From 13 Nov 2007 to 15 Nov 2007
- NA Madison, WI - From 17 Nov 2007 to 19 Nov 2007
- NA Dayton, OH - From 21 Nov 2007 to 25 Nov 2007
- NA Colorado Springs, CO - From 28 Nov 2007 to 1 Dec 2007
- NA Denver, CO - From 3 Dec 2007 to 13 Dec 2007
- NA Montréal, QC - From 19 Dec 2007 to 30 Dec 2007

==== 2008 schedule ====
- NA Québec, QC - From 3 Jan 2008 to 8 Jan 2008
- NA Chicoutimi, QC - From 16 Jan 2008 to 19 Jan 2008
- NA Detroit, MI - From 23 Jan 2008 to 27 Jan 2008
- NA Cleveland, OH - From 29 Jan 2008 to 1 Feb 2008
- NA Memphis, TN - From 20 Feb 2008 to 21 Feb 2008
- NA Charlottesville, VA - From 26 Feb 2008 to 1 Mar 2008
- NA Little Rock, AR - From 4 Mar 2008 to 6 Mar 2008
- NA Shreveport, LA - From 8 Mar 2008 to 9 Mar 2008
- NA San Antonio, TX - From 12 Mar 2008 to 16 Mar 2008
- NA Laredo, TX - From 18 Mar 2008 to 19 Mar 2008
- NA Corpus Christi, TX - From 21 Mar 2008 to 22 Mar 2008
- NA Wichita, KS - From 26 Mar 2008 to 30 Mar 2008
- NA Omaha, NE - From 2 Apr 2008 to 6 Apr 2008
- NA Des Moines, IA - From 10 Apr 2008 to 13 Apr 2008
- NA Moline, IL - From 15 Apr 2008 to 18 Apr 2008
- NA Cedar Rapids, IA - From 23 Apr 2008 to 27 Apr 2008
- NA Albuquerque, NM - From 14 May 2008 to 18 May 2008
- NA Boise, ID - From 21 May 2008 to 25 May 2008
- NA Victoria, BC - From 30 May 2008 to 1 Jun 2008
- NA Kelowna, BC - From 4 Jun 2008 to 8 Jun 2008
- NA Kamloops, BC - From 11 Jun 2008 to 15 Jun 2008
- NA Edmonton, AB - From 18 Jun 2008 to 22 Jun 2008
- NA Saskatoon, SK - From 25 Jun 2008 to 29 Jun 2008
- NA Regina, SK - From 2 Jul 2008 to 6 Jul 2008
- NA Winnipeg, MB - From 9 Jul 2008 to 13 Jul 2008
- NA Kansas City, MO - From 16 Jul 2008 to 20 Jul 2008
- NA Newark, NJ - From 7 Aug 2008 to 10 Aug 2008
- NA Toronto, ON - From 13 Aug 2008 to 24 Aug 2008
- NA Hamilton, ON - From 27 Aug 2008 to 31 Aug 2008
- NA Amherst, MA - From 3 Sep 2008 to 7 Sep 2008
- NA Buffalo, NY - From 10 Sep 2008 to 14 Sep 2008
- NA Trenton, NJ - From 17 Sep 2008 to 21 Sep 2008
- NA Minneapolis, MN - From 24 Sep 2008 to 28 Sep 2008
- NA Milwaukee, WI - From 1 Oct 2008 to 5 Oct 2008
- NA Highland Heights, KY - From 8 Oct 2008 to 12 Oct 2008
- NA Honolulu, HI - From 30 Oct 2008 to 16 Nov 2008
- NA Prescott Valley, AZ - From 20 Nov 2008 to 23 Nov 2008
- NA Tucson, AZ - From 26 Nov 2008 to 30 Nov 2008
- NA Oklahoma City, OK - From 3 Dec 2008 to 7 Dec 2008
- NA Tulsa, OK - From 10 Dec 2008 to 14 Dec 2008
- NA Hidalgo, TX - From 17 Dec 2008 to 21 Dec 2008

==== 2009 schedule ====
- NA Tupelo, MS - From 9 Jan 2009 to 11 Jan 2009
- NA Biloxi, MS - From 14 Jan 2009 to 18 Jan 2009
- NA Hoffman Estates, IL - From 21 Jan 2009 to 1 Feb 2009
- NA St. Charles, MO - From 4 Feb 2009 to 8 Feb 2009
- NA Indianapolis, IN - From 12 Feb 2009 to 15 Feb 2009
- NA Baton Rouge, LA - From 18 Feb 2009 to 20 Feb 2009
- NA Rockford, IL - From 24 Feb 2009 to 1 Mar 2009
- NA Youngstown, OH - From 4 Mar 2009 to 8 Mar 2009
- NA Louisville, KY - From 11 Mar 2009 to 15 Mar 2009
- NA Mobile, AL - From 2 Apr 2009 to 5 Apr 2009
- NA Nashville, TN - From 9 Apr 2009 to 12 Apr 2009
- NA Huntsville, AL - From 15 Apr 2009 to 19 Apr 2009
- NA Charleston, SC - From 22 Apr 2009 to 26 Apr 2009
- NA Lakeland, FL - From 29 Apr 2009 to 3 May 2009
- NA Gainesville, FL - From 7 May 2009 to 10 May 2009
- NA Tallahassee, FL - From 13 May 2009 to 17 May 2009
- NA Jacksonville, FL - From 20 May 2009 to 24 May 2009
- NA Sunrise, FL - From 27 May 2009 to 7 Jun 2009
- NA Tampa, FL - From 25 Jun 2009 to 5 Jul 2009
- NA Estero, FL - From 8 Jul 2009 to 12 Jul 2009
- NA Cypress, TX - From 15 Jul 2009 to 15 Jul 2009
- NA Houston, TX - From 22 Jul 2009 to 26 Jul 2009
- NA Phoenix, AZ - From 29 Jul 2009 to 2 Aug 2009
- NA Salt Lake City, UT - From 5 Aug 2009 to 9 Aug 2009
- NA Columbus, OH - From 12 Aug 2009 to 23 Aug 2009
- EU Stockholm, SE - From 17 Sep 2009 to 20 Sep 2009
- EU Helsinki, FI - From 23 Sep 2009 to 27 Sep 2009
- EU Turku, FI - From 30 Sep 2009 to 4 Oct 2009
- EU Oslo, NO - From 8 Oct 2009 to 11 Oct 2009
- EU Aalborg, DK - From 14 Oct 2009 to 18 Oct 2009
- EU Copenhagen, DK - From 21 Oct 2009 to 1 Nov 2009
- EU Gothenburg, SE - From 4 Nov 2009 to 8 Nov 2009
- EU Mannheim, DE - From 10 Nov 2009 to 14 Nov 2009
- EU Nice, FR - From 18 Nov 2009 to 22 Nov 2009
- EU Rotterdam, NL - From 10 Dec 2009 to 13 Dec 2009
- EU Geneva, CH - From 18 Dec 2009 to 27 Dec 2009
- EU Barcelona, ES - From 30 Dec 2009 to 10 Jan 2010

==== 2010 schedule ====
- EU Salzburg, AT - From 13 Jan 2010 to 17 Jan 2010
- EU Strasbourg, FR - From 20 Jan 2010 to 23 Jan 2010
- EU Frankfurt, DE - From 27 Jan 2010 to 31 Jan 2010
- EU Nantes, FR - From 2 Feb 2010 to 5 Feb 2010
- EU Innsbruck, AT - From 25 Feb 2010 to 28 Feb 2010
- EU Torino, IT - From 3 Mar 2010 to 7 Mar 2010
- EU Pesaro, IT - From 10 Mar 2010 to 14 Mar 2010
- EU Bologna, IT - From 17 Mar 2010 to 21 Mar 2010
- EU Florence, IT - From 24 Mar 2010 to 28 Mar 2010
- EU Stuttgart, DE - From 31 Mar 2010 to 4 Apr 2010
- EU Bremen, DE - From 7 Apr 2010 to 11 Apr 2010
- EU Valencia, ES - From 14 Apr 2010 to 18 Apr 2010
- EU Santiago, ES - From 21 Apr 2010 to 25 Apr 2010
- EU San Sebastian, ES - From 28 Apr 2010 to 2 May 2010
- EU Sheffield, UK - From 20 May 2010 to 23 May 2010
- EU Liverpool, UK - From 26 May 2010 to 30 May 2010
- EU Glasgow, UK - From 2 Jun 2010 to 6 Jun 2010
- EU Manchester, UK - From 9 Jun 2010 to 13 Jun 2010
- EU Birmingham, UK - From 17 Jun 2010 to 27 Jun 2010
- EU Newcastle, UK - From 30 Jun 2010 to 4 Jul 2010
- EU Dublin, IE - From 7 Jul 2010 to 18 Jul 2010
- EU Nottingham, UK - From 21 Jul 2010 to 25 Jul 2010
- EU London, UK - From 28 Jul 2010 to 1 Aug 2010
- EU Hamburg, DE - From 19 Aug 2010 to 22 Aug 2010
- EU Dortmund, DE - From 25 Aug 2010 to 29 Aug 2010
- EU Berlin, DE - From 1 Sep 2010 to 4 Sep 2010
- EU Munich, DE - From 7 Sep 2010 to 12 Sep 2010
- EU Milan, IT - From 15 Sep 2010 to 18 Sep 2010
- EU Zaragoza, ES - From 22 Sep 2010 to 26 Sep 2010
- EU Granada, ES - From 29 Sep 2010 to 3 Oct 2010
- EU Madrid, ES - From 5 Oct 2010 to 10 Oct 2010
- EU Lisbon, PT - From 13 Oct 2010 to 24 Oct 2010
- EU Prague, CZ - From 12 Nov 2010 to 14 Nov 2010
- EU Zagreb, HR - From 17 Nov 2010 to 21 Nov 2010
- EU Belgrade, RS - From 24 Nov 2010 to 28 Nov 2010
- EU Basel, CH - From 1 Dec 2010 to 5 Dec 2010
- EU Budapest, HU - From 8 Dec 2010 to 12 Dec 2010
- EU Nurnberg, DE - From 15 Dec 2010 to 19 Dec 2010
- EU Antwerp, BE - From 22 Dec 2010 to 2 Jan 2011

==== 2011 schedule ====
- EU Lille, FR - From 5 Jan 2011 to 9 Jan 2011
- EU Paris, FR - From 13 Jan 2011 to 16 Jan 2011
- EU Friedrichshafen, DE - From 11 Feb 2011 to 13 Feb 2011
- EU Istanbul, TR - From 18 Feb 2011 to 5 Mar 2011
- AF Johannesburg, ZA - From 9 Mar 2011 to 20 Mar 2011
- AF Cape Town, ZA - From 23 Mar 2011 to 3 Apr 2011
- OC Perth, AU - From 21 Apr 2011 to 8 May 2011
- OC Adelaide, AU - From 12 May 2011 to 22 May 2011
- OC Melbourne, AU - From 25 May 2011 to 11 Jun 2011
- OC Hobart, AU - From 15 Jun 2011 to 19 Jun 2011
- OC Brisbane, AU - From 8 Jul 2011 to 17 Jul 2011
- OC Newcastle, AU - From 20 Jul 2011 to 24 Jul 2011
- OC Sydney, AU - From 27 Jul 2011 to 14 Aug 2011
- OC Wollongong, AU - From 17 Aug 2011 to 21 Aug 2011
- OC Auckland, NZ - From 25 Aug 2011 to 4 Sep 2011
- AP Shanghai, CN - From 21 Sep 2011 to 1 Oct 2011
- EU Ekaterinburg, RU - From 15 Oct 2011 to 23 Oct 2011
- EU Kazan, RU - From 26 Oct 2011 to 30 Oct 2011
- EU Moscow, RU - From 3 Nov 2011 to 13 Nov 2011
- EU St Petersburg, RU - From 16 Nov 2011 to 21 Nov 2011
- EU Kyiv, UA - From 27 Nov 2011 to 4 Dec 2011
- EU Vilnius, LT - From 15 Dec 2011 17 Dec 2011
- EU Riga, LV - From 21 Dec 2011 to 25 Dec 2011
- EU Tallinn, EE - From 28 Dec 2011 to 1 Jan 2012

==== 2012 schedule ====
- EU Gdansk, PL - From 19 Jan 2012 to 22 Jan 2012
- EU Malmo, SE - From 26 Jan 2012 to 29 Jan 2012
- EU Sofia, BG - From 3 Feb 2012 to 5 Feb 2012
- EU Bucharest, RO - From 8 Feb 2012 to 12 Feb 2012
- EU Bratislava, SK - From 15 Feb 2012 to 19 Feb 2012
- EU Graz, AT - From 22 Feb 2012 to 26 Feb 2012
- EU Bordeaux, FR - From 2 Mar 2012 to 5 Mar 2012
- EU Dijon, FR - From 9 Mar 2012 to 11 Mar 2012
- EU Rome, IT - From 15 Mar 2012 to 18 Mar 2012
- AF Casablanca, MA - From 6 Apr to 15 Apr 2012
- AP Beirut, LB - From 10 May 2012 to 20 May 2012
- EU Catany, IT - From 5 Jun 2012 to 17 Jun 2012
- AP Ammán, JO - From 26 Jun 2012 to 30 Jun 2012
- AP Doha, QA - From 4 Jul 2012 to 7 Jul 2012
- AP Hong Kong, HK - From 12 Jul 2012 to 22 Jul 2012
- AP Singapore, SG - From 26 Jul 2012 to 5 Aug 2012
- AP Manila, PH - From 9 Aug 2012 to 19 Aug 2012
- AP Kaohsiung, TW - From 29 Aug 2012 to 2 Sep 2012
- AP Taipei, TW - From 5 Sep 2012 to 9 Sep 2012
- NA Portland, ME - From 10 Oct 2012 to 14 Oct 2012
- NA Pittsburgh, PA - From 18 Oct 2012 to 21 Oct 2012
- NA Reading, PA - From 25 Oct 2012 to 27 Oct 2012
- NA Boston, MA - From 31 Oct 2012 to 4 Nov 2012
- NA Pensacola, FL - From 7 Nov 2012 to 8 Nov 2012
- NA San Juan, PR - From 15 Nov 2012 to 18 Nov 2012
- NA Santo Domingo, DO - From 22 Nov 2012 to 25 Nov 2012
- NA Cedar Park, TX - From 12 Dec 2012 to 16 Dec 2012
- NA Montréal, QC - From 19 Dec 2012 to 30 Dec 2012 (final show)

=== Grand Chapiteau tour ===
1992-2006

==== 1992 schedule ====
NA Montréal, QC - From 23 Apr 1992 to 2 Jun 1992 (show première)
NA Québec, QC - From 13 Jun 1992 to 28 Jun 1992
NA San Francisco, CA - From 14 Jul 1992 to 16 Aug 1992
NA San Jose, CA - From 27 Aug 1992 to 27 Sep 1992
NA Santa Monica, CA - From 8 Oct 1992 to 20 Dec 1992

==== 1993 schedule ====
NA Costa Mesa, CA - From 30 Jan 1993 to 14 Mar 1993
NA New York, NY - From 30 Mar 1993 to 6 Jun 1993
NA Toronto, ON - From 18 Jun 1993 to 11 Jul 1993
NA Chicago, IL - From 28 Jul 1993 to 29 Aug 1993
NA Boston, MA - From 9 Sep 1993 to 3 Oct 1993
NA Washington, DC - From 14 Oct 1993 to 7 Nov 1993
NA Atlanta, GA - From 18 Nov 1993 to 19 Dec 1993

==== 1994 schedule ====
AP Tokyo, JP - From 11 Mar 1994 to 11 Sep 1994
NA Montreal, QC - From 02 Nov 1994 to 08 Jan 1995

==== 1995 schedule ====
EU Amsterdam, NL - From 9 Mar 1995 to 13 Apr 1995
EU Munich, DE - From 19 May 1995 to 9 Jul 1995
EU Berlin, DE - From 21 Jul 1995 to 3 Sep 1995
EU Düsseldorf, DE - From 15 Sep 1995 to 17 Oct 1995
EU Vienna, AT - From 10 Nov 1995 to 17 Dec 1995

==== 1996 schedule ====
(Saltimbanco played in the Royal Albert Hall in London, UK during this time)
EU Hamburg, DE - From 8 Feb 1996 to 10 Mar 1996
EU Amsterdam, NL - From 5 Apr 1996 to 19 May 1996
EU Stuttgart, DE - From 31 May 1996 to 14 Jul 1996
EU Antwerp, BE - From 26 Jul 1996 to 1 Sep 1996
EU Zurich, CH - From 13 Sep 1996 to 20 Oct 1996
EU Frankfurt, DE - From 11 Nov 1996 to 22 Dec 1996

==== 1997 schedule ====
(Saltimbanco played in the Royal Albert Hall in London, UK during this time)

==== 1998 schedule ====
NA Ottawa, ON - From 14 Oct 1998 to 1 Nov 1998

==== 1999 schedule ====
OC Sydney, AU - From 7 Jan 1999 to 7 Mar 1999
OC Melbourne, AU - From 18 Mar 1999 to 16 May 1999
OC Brisbane, AU - From 28 May 1999 to 8 Jul 1999
OC Adelaide, AU - From 21 Jul 1999 to 25 Aug 1999
OC Perth, AU - From 9 Sep 1999 to 17 Oct 1999
AP Singapore, SG - From 25 Nov 1999 to 8 Jan 2000

==== 2000 schedule ====
AP Hong Kong, HK - From 25 Jan 2000 to 19 Mar 2000
NA Portland, OR - From 11 May 2000 to 25 Jun 2000
NA Seattle, WA - From 6 Jul 2000 to 3 Sep 2000
AP Tokyo, JP - From 12 Oct 2000 to 28 Jan 2001

==== 2001 schedule ====
AP Fukuoka, JP - From 9 Feb 2001 to 8 Apr 2001
AP Nagoya, JP - From 20 Apr 2001 to 3 Jun 2001
AP Osaka, JP - From 10 Jun 2001 to 9 Sep 2001
AP Yokohama, JP - From 20 Sep 2001 to 25 Nov 2001

==== 2002 schedule ====
EU Amsterdam, NL - From 14 Feb 2002 to 14 Apr 2002
EU Barcelona, ES - From 26 Apr 2002 to 26 May 2002
EU Vienna, AT - From 10 Jul 2002 to 4 Aug 2002
EU Brussels, BE - From 4 Sep 2002 to 19 Oct 2002
EU Madrid, ES - From 31 Oct 2002 to 26 Dec 2002

==== 2003 schedule ====
(Saltimbanco played in the Royal Albert Hall in London, UK during this time)
EU Bilbao, ES - From 26 Feb 2003 to 6 Apr 2003
EU Geneva, CH - From 18 Apr 2003 to 25 May 2003
EU Cologne, DE - From 5 Jun 2003 to 29 Jun 2003
EU Oostende, BE - From 24 Jul 2003 to 17 Aug 2003
EU Zurich, CH - From 19 Sep 2003 to 26 Oct 2003
EU Valencia, ES - From 28 Nov 2003 to 21 Dec 2003

==== 2004 schedule ====
EU Seville, ES - From 16 Jan 2004 to 22 Feb 2004
EU Lyon, FR - From 5 Mar 2004 to 18 Apr 2004
EU Milan, IT - From 29 Apr 2004 to 6 Jun 2004
EU Gijon, ES - From 25 Jun 2004 to 31 Jul 2004
EU Frankfurt, DE - From 20 Aug 2004 to 25 Sep 2004
EU Rome, IT - From 7 Oct 2004 to 31 Oct 2004
EU Lille, FR - From 25 Nov 2004 to 26 Dec 2004

==== 2005 schedule ====
EU Manchester, UK - From 6 Jan 2005 to 27 Jan 2005
EU Birmingham, UK - From 24 Feb 2005 to 13 Mar 2005
EU Paris, FR - From 8 Apr 2005 to 17 Jul 2005
NA Monterrey, MX - From 4 Aug 2005 to 11 Sep 2005
NA Mexico City, MX - From 22 Sep 2005 to 6 Nov 2005
NA Guadalajara, MX - From 17 Nov 2005 to 1 Jan 2006

==== 2006 schedule ====
NA Mexico City, MX - From 13 Jan 2006 to 5 Feb 2006
SA Santiago, CL - From 15 Mar 2006 to 22 Apr 2006
SA Buenos Aires, AR - From 5 May 2006 to 11 Jun 2006
SA São Paulo, BR - From 3 Aug 2006 to 22 Oct 2006
SA Rio de Janeiro, BR - From 2 Nov 2006 to 10 Dec 2006 (final show under Big Top)
