= René Dupéré =

Canadian composer (born 1946)

- Born: 1946 (age 79–80); Québec, Canada
- Genres: Theatre, film score
- Occupation: Composer

René Dupéré (born 1946) is a Canadian composer from Mont-Joli, Québec, Canada.

== Biography ==
Dupéré is best known as the composer and arranger of music for contemporary circus productions by the Canadian entertainment company Cirque du Soleil. Among the Cirque du Soleil stage shows he has scored are: Le Grand Tour du Cirque du Soleil (1984), La Magie Continue (1986), Le Cirque Réinventé (1987), Nouvelle Expérience (1990), Saltimbanco (1992), Mystère (1993), Alegría (1994), Kà (2004), and Zed (2009). According to press releases from Cirque du Soleil, "René Dupéré played a key role in shaping the artistic universe of Cirque du Soleil during its first ten years."

Dupéré's album of music from Cirque du Soleil's Alegría was nominated for a Grammy Award in 1995 and spent 65 weeks on Billboard's World Music Chart. The albums Mystère and Kà also spent several weeks at the top of the Billboard charts. As of 2009, Dupéré has sold over 3 million CDs.

His work outside of Cirque du Soleil has included writing music for various TV and film productions (see Filmography below). In 1997, he wrote part of the music for the ceremony marking the handover of Hong Kong to China. He also composed the soundtrack for Xotica: Journey to the Heart, a Holiday on Ice show that toured in 1998. A modified version of a song entitled "Earth" from the Xotica soundtrack was used as the backing track for the 2003 short film Oïo by Simon Goulet.

In June 2005, René Dupéré received an honorary doctorate in music from his alma mater, Université Laval de Québec.

== Discography ==
- 1987 : Cirque du Soleil (1987 album)
- 1990 : Cirque du Soleil (1990 album)
- 1990 : Nouvelle Expérience
- 1992 : Saltimbanco
- 1994 : Alegría
- 1994 : Mystère
- 1996 : Mystère Live in Las Vegas
- 1997 : Voyage
- 1999 : Xotica: Journey to the Heart
- 2005 : Kà
- 2009 : Zed

== Filmography ==
- 1986 : La Magie continue (TV)
- 1986 : Anne Trister
- 1989 : La Toile blanche
- 1989 : Ballade urbaine (short documentary)
- 1991 : Nouvelle expérience (TV)
- 1991: Primary Colors: The Story of Corita (TV documentary)
- 1991 : The Irises (short animation)
- 1992 : Cirque réinventé (TV)
- 1994 : Cirque du Soleil: A Baroque Odyssey (TV)
- 1997 : Saltimbanco (TV)
- 1998 : L'Ombre de l'épervier (TV series)
- 2001 : Alegría: Live in Sydney (TV)
- 2003 : Oïo (short film)
- 2004 : Ciertos vacíos (short documentary)
- 2004 : White Skin
- 2007 : La luna en botella
- 2008 : Journey to the Center of the Earth (TV film)

== Awards ==
- Felix for best producer of the year for the soundtrack album of Alegría in 1995.
- Golden Award for best original music for Ismya Vova from the New York Publicity Festival in 1998.
- Two Hagood Hardy prizes given by the Society of Composers, Authors and Music Publishers of Canada (SOCAN).

== See also ==
- Cirque du Soleil discography
