= Vedra Chandler =

American singer and dancer (born 1980)

Vedra Della Chandler (born 1980) is a singer and dancer from Camden, New Jersey.

== Early life and education ==
Born 1980, Chandler attended Westfield Friends School where she received an education grounded in the spiritual teachings of the Quaker religion. Following Friends school Vedra choose to attend Haddonfield Memorial High School in Haddonfield, New Jersey, where she was captain of the tennis team, Student Council President and Homecoming Queen. She was accepted to Harvard University and graduated in 2002 with a degree in Government. Early on she pursued a career in business as a warehouse supervisor.

== Career ==
Vedra began dancing when she was four years old at the Marcia Hyland Dance and Arts Center in Mount Laurel, New Jersey. She performed in high school musicals and while at Harvard she danced with the Harvard Crimson Dance Team which earned 5th and 4th rankings at the NDA National Cheerleading and Dance Competitions in 2001 and 2002 respectively. She continued performing while working in the business world, dancing for Bon Joviʼs Philadelphia Soul arena football team. In 2005, she joined the touring company of "Hairspray!", the hit Broadway Musical.

Later she performed in multiple theater projects around the world. These included productions of Aida, All Shook Up!, High School Musical, and a national tour of The Wizard of Oz. In 2010 she accepted the role of Soul Singer on Cirque Du Soleil's big top touring show, Kooza.

In 2010, Chandler joined Cirque Du Soleil to perform the role of the Soul Singer on Kooza. Her last show with Cirque was on 5 April 2015 in Bern, Switzerland.

After a decade of touring Vedra is back in her hometown of Camden, NJ where in addition to performing she works with local governments and nonprofits to develop programs and solutions that improve social capital in urban neighborhoods. By activating underutilized spaces with art and cultural installations and activities, Vedra consistently uses the arts as a vehicle to tap into the potential of Camden city and its residents. Vedra serves as Vice Chairperson of the Camden County Arts and Heritage Commission and is a member of Macedonia A.M.E. Church in Camden, NJ, and performs with her musical ensemble CPR: Music Invincible throughout the Delaware Valley and with the Victor Company Players in Berlin, NJ.

== Memberships ==
Chandler is a member of the National Association of Negro Musicians and Alpha Kappa Alpha sorority.
