= Chinese pole =

Vertical pole used in circus performing

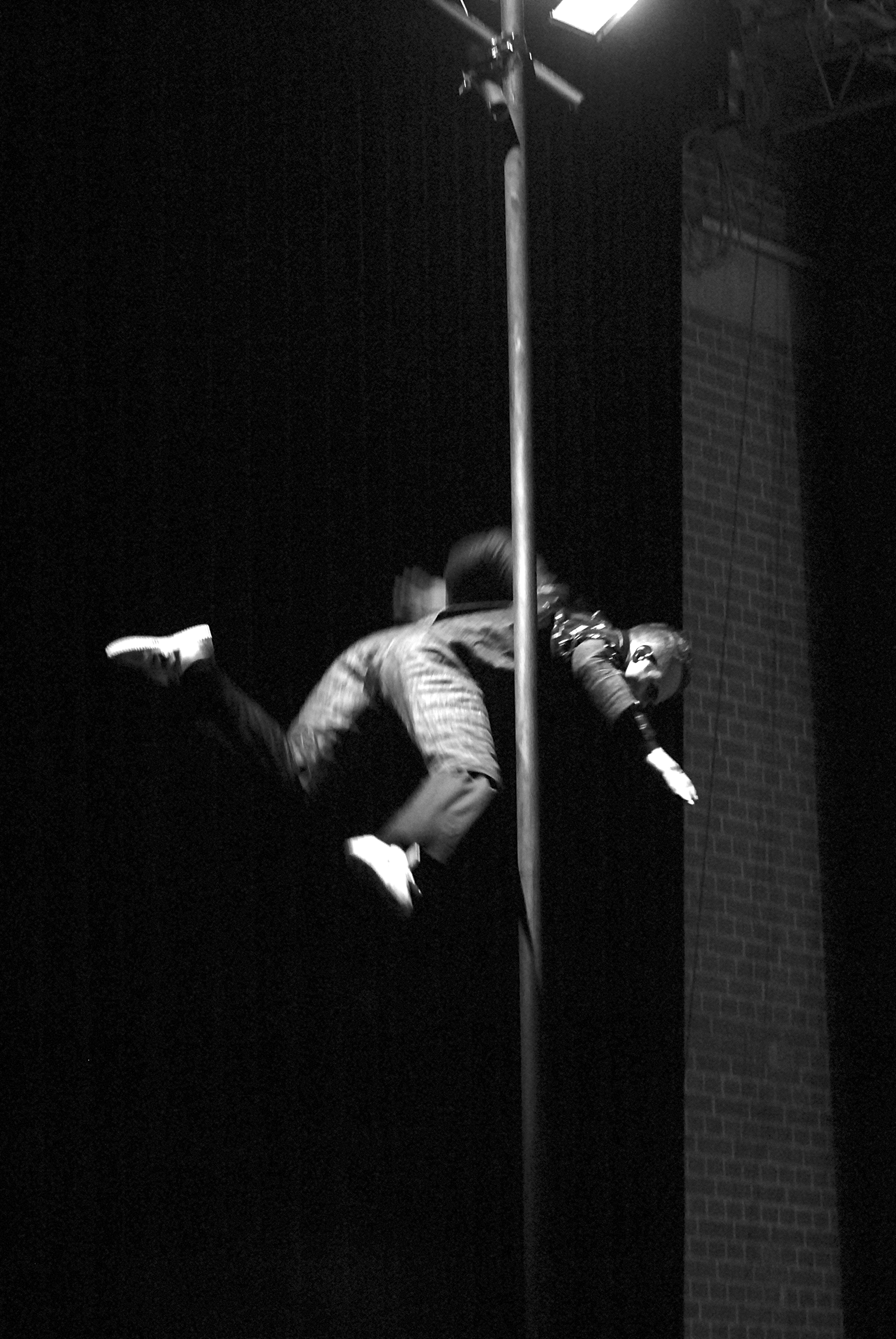
Italian circus artist Paolo Locci on the Chinese pole

Chinese poles are vertical poles on which circus performers climb, slide down and hold poses. The poles are generally between 3 and 9 metres (10 and 30 ft) in height and approximately 2 to 3 inches (5 to 8 cm) in diameter. Some poles have a slightly larger pole that rotates around the static central pole using ball bearings. This rotating pole allows a performer to spin on the vertical axis, giving a performer the ability to incorporate rate of spin into a performance. Bringing the body closer into the pole causes the performer to spin faster. A few Chinese pole tricks have been incorporated with pole dancing techniques.

The poles are sometimes covered with rubber to improve grip. However, the rubber can cause friction burns on parts of the Chinese pole artists' bodies. Acrobats often wear multiple layers of clothing to prevent such burns and bruises.

The most famous trick is "the flag", where the artist hangs straight out from the pole with their hands. This requires a very strong upper body. A few people are able to do pushups in this position, and even fewer can rotate the legs around in a circle—this requires enormous core strength.

Chinese pole acts have been featured in the Cirque du Soleil shows Saltimbanco, Mystère, Zed, Amaluna, Luzia, and Messi10.

== Gallery ==
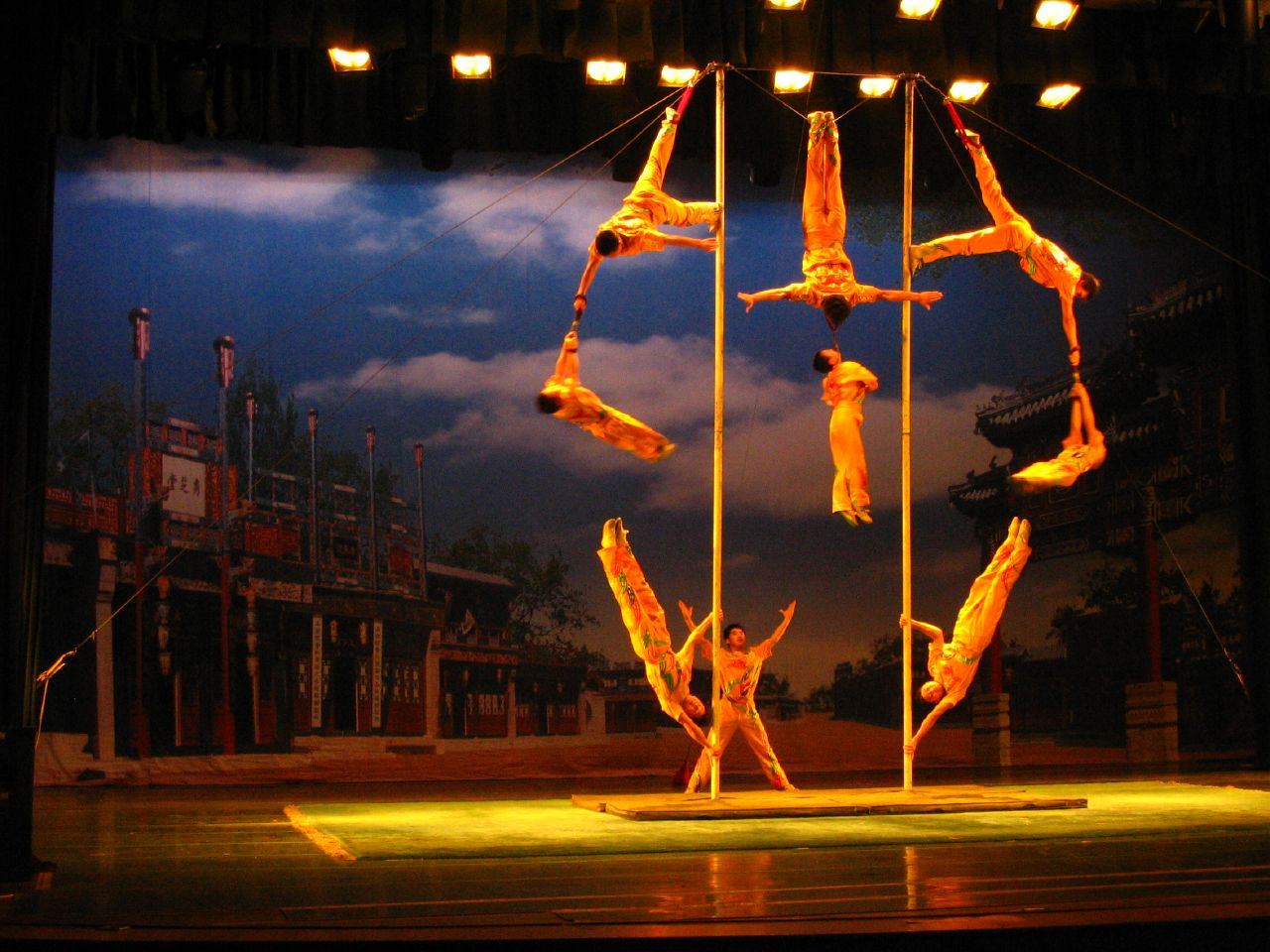
Example of Chinese pole dancing from China

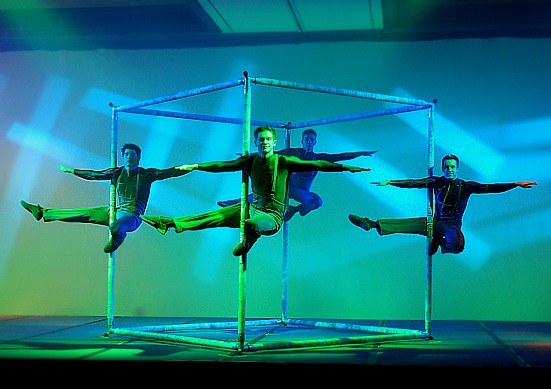
Demonstration of the monkey sit

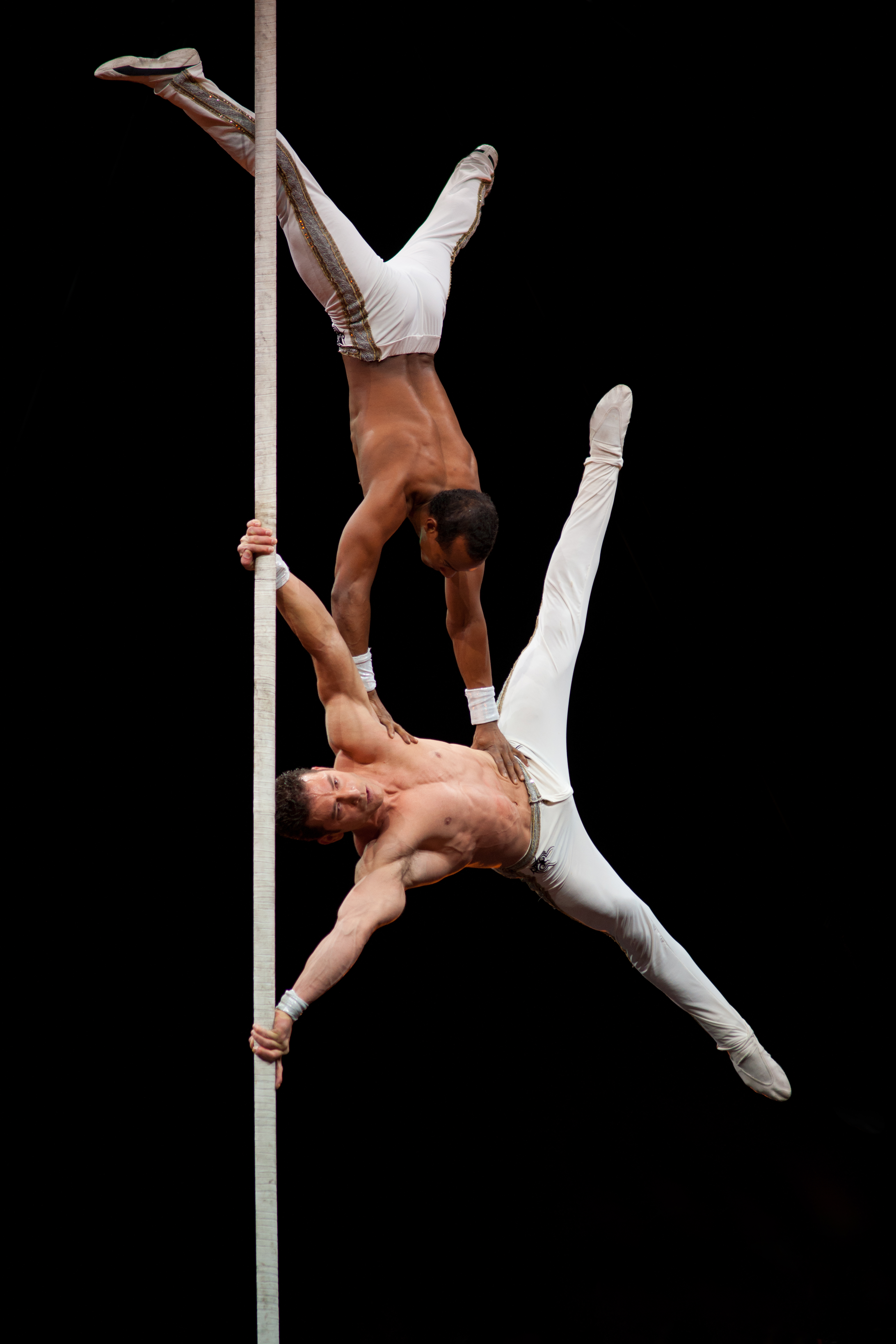
Cuban acrobatic artists Leosvel and Diosmani on the Chinese pole
