= René Bazinet =

German-Canadian clown, mime, and actor (born 1955)

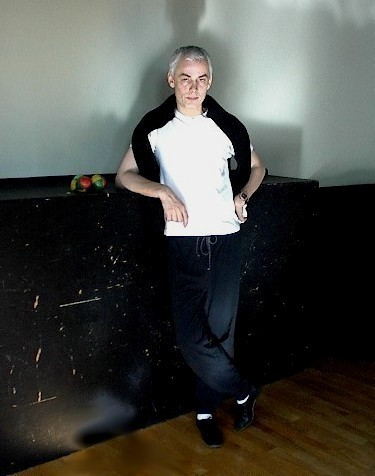
- Bazinet at a studio workshop in Montreal, Canada, 2002
- Born: René Fiener; 1955 (age 70–71); Bochum, West Germany
- Occupation: Master clown, mime, teacher, actor

René Bazinet (born 1955) is a German-Canadian clown, mime, and stage and film actor. He is known for his work with Cirque du Soleil, first as a performing artist touring extensively with Saltimbanco, and later as the clown act creator and acting consultant for the show as well as for Cirque du Soleil's 2011 production Zarkana. He has also starred in shows at the Berlin Wintergarten and the Circus Roncalli.

== Life and career ==
Bazinet was born René Fiener (his mother's surname) in Bochum, West Germany. His father was Willy Dege, a cabaret and variety artist. When he was 14, his mother married a Canadian military police officer, Sgt. Major Bazinet, who adopted him, and the family emigrated to Canada. After completing high school in Montreal, Bazinet studied theatre at John Abbott College in Quebec. One of his teachers there, who had studied with Jacques Lecoq, recognized Bazinet's talent for mime and devised a one-man show for him.

On his teacher's recommendation he was accepted at the École Internationale de Théâtre Jacques Lecoq and in 1978 left for Paris. There he was particularly influenced by the master clown Philippe Gaulier. It was through Gaulier that Bazinet made his first appearance in West Germany, playing Harlequin in a 1980 Gaulier show at the Frankfurter Autoren Theater. Jorge Zulueta and Jacobo Romano, the founders of Grupo Accion Instrumental, saw his Frankfurt performances and offered him a job writing and performing in their theatre productions for Paris, Graz, and the Venice Biennale. When he left the Grupo Accion ensemble in 1982, he reconnected with Philippe Gaulier, who had opened his own school with the actress Monika Pagneux. Bazinet did further studies in theatrical movement with Pagneux and worked as a street performer in Paris, often in the plaza of the Pompidou Center.

In a 1984 article on the Pompidou Center street performers for The Drama Review, Kris Palmquist described Bazinet's miming as marked by a strong "inwardness" and noted,

René puts all his emphasis on the perfection of movement, precise and unusual body placement, and rhythmic timing. If everything goes correctly, his act is hypnotic.

During this period, Bazinet formed what was to be a life-long friendship with David Shiner who also worked as a street mime at the Pompidou. In 1988 Bazinet and Shiner (who by then was based in Munich) produced and performed a two-man show there and then took it on tour through Germany for a year and later to the rest of Europe. The 1980s also saw Bazinet performing mime roles in several operas including Maurice Ohana's La Célestine (Paris Opera, 1988); Menotti's The Medium (Opéra de Nantes, 1983); and Stravinsky's Renard (La Fenice, 1982).

Bazinet's association with Cirque du Soleil began in 1992 when he created and performed four roles in their premiere production of Saltimbanco. He remained a cornerstone of the production for its first four years as it toured internationally. Variety's critic Christopher Meeks wrote:

The funniest act on opening night was when clown Rene Bazinet, performing mime with self-produced sound effects, ensnared a denim-dressed man from the audience to join him. The man warmed to the clown's wordless mime lessons, and they enacted eating bananas, slipping on the peels, and, in inspired shenanigans, a shootout at high noon.

He went on to provide movement and Feldenkrais training for the performers in Cirque du Soleil's next production Quidam and was the clown act creator and acting consultant for later productions of Saltimbanco as well as their 2011 production Zarkana. He also played the leading role of Frac in the 1999 film Alegría which was based on the Cirque du Soleil show of the same name.

During the late 1990s and early 2000s Bazinet performed mainly in Germany where he appeared in circuses such as the Circus Roncalli and Salto Natale and in numerous variety and cabaret shows at Berlin's Wintergarten and elsewhere. In the later years of his career he has been based in Montreal and still performs occasionally. He appeared with his fellow veteran clowns Oleg Popov, Peter Shub, David Shiner and Avner Eisenberg in the revue Lachen machen – die Könige der Clowns which toured Germany in 2012, but he has switched his primary focus from performing to teaching and directing. In 1999 he wrote Le Clown, an illustrated book on the art of clowning, published by Éditions Logiques and part of the series Collection Arts du cirque.

== Filmography ==
- Silent Sonata (2011), as the Ring Master
- In The Cooler (2009, short film), as Cabaret Dancer
- Alegría (1999), as Frac
- Saltimbanco (1997)
- Satie and Suzanne (1994), as Chess Player
- The Man Inside (1990), as Herbert Stroh
- Mit den Clowns kamen die Tränen (1990 TV mini-series)
- La reine de la jungle (1987 TV movie), as Bernadette
- Music Hall (1986 TV movie), as Poum
