= Zed (Cirque du Soleil) =

Former Cirque du Soleil production

Coordinates: 35°37′58″N 139°53′19″E

- Logo for Cirque du Soleil's Zed
- Company: Cirque du Soleil
- Genre: Contemporary circus
- Show type: Resident show
- Date of premiere: October 1, 2008
- Final show: December 31, 2011
- Location: Cirque du Soleil Theater, Tokyo Disney Resort, Urayasu, Japan

Creative team
- Artistic guide: Gilles Ste-Croix
- Executive producer: Francois Macerola
- Writer and director: François Girard
- Creation director: Line Tremblay
- Set designer: François Séguin
- Costume designer: Renée April
- Composer and arranger: René Dupéré
- Lighting designer: David Finn
- Choreographers: Debra Brown; Jean-Jacques Pillet
- Sound designer: François Bergeron
- Acrobatic equipment and rigging designer: Scott Osgood
- Acrobatic performance designer: Florence Pot
- Make-up designer: Eleni Uranis
- Production manager: Michael Anderson
- Guest creator-dramatist: Serge Lamothe

Other information
- Preceded by: Zaia (2008)
- Succeeded by: Criss Angel Believe (2008)
- Official website

Zed was Cirque du Soleil's second resident show in Asia. It premiered on October 1, 2008, at the Cirque du Soleil Theater, Tokyo Disney Resort, in Urayasu, Chiba, Japan. Inspiration for Zed was taken from the Tarot and its Arcana; the main character Zed represents the Fool of the Tarot. The show depicted Zed's journey and his role in uniting two mythical groups, the people of the earth and sky. The production closed permanently on December 31, 2011.

== History ==
Due to the 2011 Tōhoku earthquake and tsunami, shows from March 11 through April 20, 2011 were cancelled. The artists and staff of Zed were temporarily relocated to Macau where they continued training at Cirque du Soleil's resident show Zaia. The major benefit of relocating there was that the team was able to partner with the crews of Koozå (which was also relocated from Japan) and Zaia at the Macau training facilities. The troupe was able to start performances again on April 23 after a thorough safety inspection of the theatre and facilities had been undertaken.

On Sunday, July 24, 2011, it was announced to the cast and crew of Zed that The Oriental Land Company and Cirque du Soleil had come to an agreement to permanently close the production on December 31, 2011. The closure was due to the business environment that arose from the impacts of the 2011 Tōhoku earthquake and tsunami. Zed had reached its one-millionth guest faster than any show in Japan, and had seen great success with over 1,000 performances. On April 17, 2020, Cirque du Soleil released a 60-minute special of Zed through its #CirqueConnect channel on YouTube. CirqueConnect

== Set and technical information ==
Cirque du Soleil spent three years constructing the Cirque du Soleil Theatre Tokyo for its resident show Zed. The theatre, which is located at the Tokyo Disney Resort, was exclusively designed for Zed. The roof was formed by polyhedrons and was made to look similar to the circus tents seen at Cirque du Soleil's Grand Chapiteau touring shows. The form was designed to capture the sun's light from any angle.

François Séguin, set designer, drew inspiration for the set design from the astrolabe. The atmosphere of the stage was intended to evoke the High Renaissance and the beginning of the Mechanical Age. Finishings of the stage included many brass and copper components representing mechanical gears. Above the stage, a globe showed the meridians and lines of latitude, while the Milky Way and phases of the moon appeared on the stage floor. Also seen throughout the stage and show was the "Zed Alpha"—a 26-letter alphabet created for the show.

Due to safety concerns arising from the 2011 Tōhoku earthquake and tsunami, Cirque du Soleil ordered a NZ$15,000 inflatable air bag from Canvasland located in Levin, New Zealand. The nylon cushion measured 12 by 5 metres (39 ft × 16 ft) and weighed 200 kilograms (440 lb). The design included an air mattress base and inflated tongs; this allowed the artist to fall safely in any position without bouncing off. The new device was used in the high wire act, ensuring additional safety in the event of any new earthquakes and aftershocks.

== Characters ==
As the inspiration of Zed was the Tarot and its Arcana, many of the characters were based on this tradition.

- Zed: Inspired by the Fool of the Tarot, Zed is the main character in the show.
- Nouit: Representative of the starry sky, she is a singer and the incarnation of the Great Goddess, Mother of the Sky.
- Erato: A muse and a beautiful goddess of Heaven.
- Abraka: Inspired by the Magician of the Tarot, this character is the father of Earth and is flanked by servants who wear gold and blue Venetian livery.
- Kernoon: Inspired by the Tarot card of the Devil, this medieval character holds fire in his hands and wears and a large silk coat covered with a hundred orange and red flowers.
- Shaman: As representative of the Hierophant (i.e. the Pope) in the Tarot, the Shaman guides Zed on his journey. He wears a transparent copper-colored mesh costume and a tribal headdress.
- Djinn: Accompanies the Shaman and is the bringer of light and fire. He is dressed in gold and turquoise blue with shades of green and covered in tattoos.
- Clowns: Two clowns named Oulai and Nalai. One is a petty dictator and the other is just lazy.
- The People of the Sky: These characters are dressed in turquoise, blue and iridescent colors, resembling dragonflies or elves. The Nymphs, who also belong to this people, look like jellyfish with fiery tails.
- The Satyrs: These characters embody the forces of nature; they wear justaucorps and flames that go over their heads like the horns of goat. Some of them as a know name, like Le Corbeau or Le Renard.

== Acts ==
The acts of Zed featured various circus skills:

- Vortex: The opening of the show, a vortex effect was created by a large silk sheet that covered the stage plummeting into a hole.
- Bungee: Four female performers represented the sky by flipping and twisting off a trapeze with bungee chords.
- Lassos: A Chinese troupe manipulated lassos, they would spin the lassos while tumbling through them, this act represented the earth.
- Poles and trampoline: A group of men from the earth tried to reach the women of the sky by jumping from a trampoline and climbing poles.
- Solo tissue: A jaw-dropping tissue act, the artist wrapped the silk around her body, she flipped and twisted to unwrap herself. This act represented the air.
- High wire: A trio of performers walked a high wire precariously, the wire was in the border of the sky world and the earth world.
- Juggling: A group of men representing the earth juggled clubs, discs and even fire clubs.
- Banquine: A large group of acrobats were flung high in the air by porters, and created high human towers.
- Straps: Two women, each representing the different worlds performed tricks in perfect synchronisation.
- Batons: A world champion baton twirler spun and threw up to three batons at a time,
- Hand to hand: A woman of the sky and a man of the earth united in this touching balancing act.
- Flying trapeze: Artists swung between four trapezes, performing flips throughout. Since 2012, this version of the act (along with its music) has been performed in Mystere, another resident Cirque show in Las Vegas.
- Charivari: The worlds united, and every act came together in this amazing finale.

== Costumes ==
Central to Zed's theme was the uniting of the people from the earth and sky. To set them apart, costume designer Renée April chose iridescent colors, pale shades, and a heavy usage of pearl and silver for the people of the sky, and chose an Italian Renaissance color palette (gold, ochre, Venetian blue, turquoise green) for the people of the earth. Zed, who united this group, was clad in darted, all-white organza, and his outfit was reminiscent of a Pierrot. Djinn, who was part of the earth group, wore an outfit made of a stretch silicone material. The neckline had a type of gold leaf appliqué to resemble an Inca or Aztec necklace. The torso, upper body, and arms had tattoo designs printed on the silicone material.

Additional highlights of the costumes included the following.

- Nouit was fitted with 14 wings. Her costume was decorated with 400 LED lights.
- Abraka's 4 wings spread out over 18 metres (59 ft) and ranged in color from purple to gold.
- Kernoun's yellow and dark brown ochre costume had a hundred cornettes (orange and red flowers) sewn onto it. Many of these were motorized to create a rippling effect.

== Music ==
René Dupéré composed the music of Zed, except "First Incantation", "Vaneyou Mi Le", "Fiesta" and "Kernoon's Fire", which were co-written by E.L. Allaire and M.L. Ferguson. The soundtrack was produced, mixed and engineered by Martin Lord Ferguson and Ella Louise Allaire. The album for Zed was released on October 13, 2009. The acts associated with each song are in parentheses below.

1. First Incantation (Baton Twirling and Opening)
2. Birth of the Sky (Bungee)
3. Reaching Up (Chinese Poles and Trampoline)
4. Blue Silk (Aerial Silk)
5. High Temptation (High Wire)
6. Vaneyou Mi Le (Banquine, 2nd part)
7. Zed in Love (Aerial Straps)
8. Kernoon's Fire (Juggling)
9. Mirror of the Two Worlds (Combining of the two halves of Zed, Baton Twirling)
10. The Worlds Meet (Hand to Hand)
11. Fiesta (Trapeze)
12. Hymn of the Worlds (Charivari and Finale)

Songs not on the soundtrack album:

- Animation (Pre-show (Music is similar to "Combining of the two halves of Zed"))
- Birth on Earth (Lassos)
- Pendulum (High Wire intro)
- Entr'Acte (Intermission, 2008 - 2010)
- Banquine - Part 1 (Banquine, 1st part was replaced during the first year of the show)
- Babel (Banquine, 1st part)
- Playing the Shaman (Clown act 3)
- Closing of the Storybook (Clown act 4)

== Trivia ==
In 2023, a song from the show; 'The Worlds Meet' was adapted by composer René Dupéré and former Cirque du Soleil singer Francesca Gagnon, into the song "Where Children Play", featuring Daniel Lavoie.

== Filmography ==
In 2010, Cirque du Soleil released Zed in Tokyo, a short documentary about the creation of Zed. It was filmed in both Montreal and Tokyo. The show has also been filmed during its last performances in December 2011.
