= Nouvelle Expérience =

Cirque du Soleil show

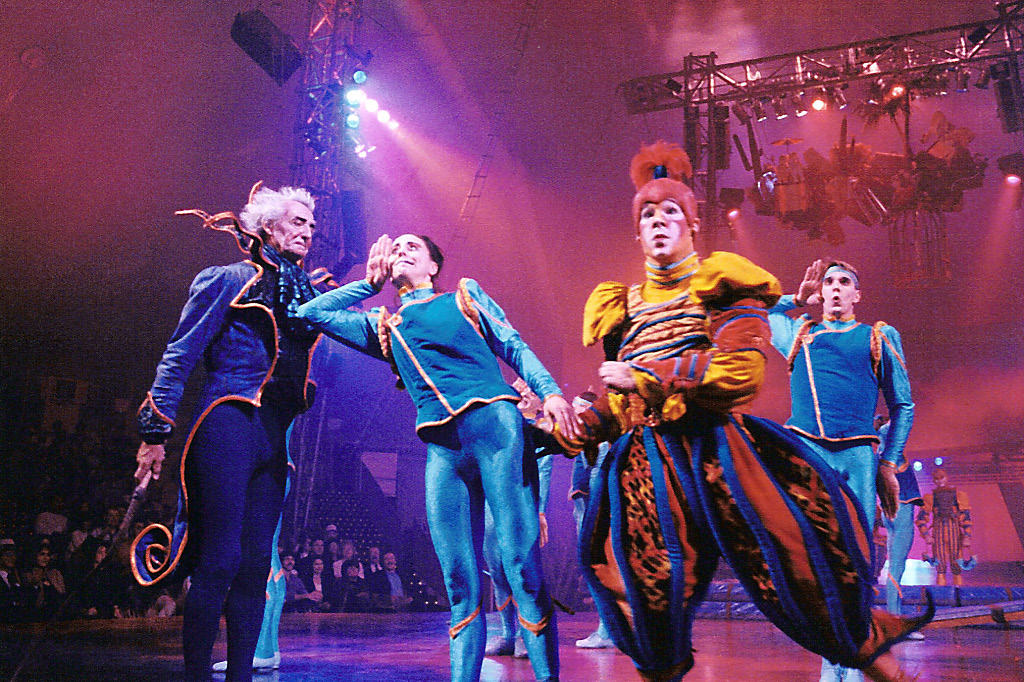
- Company: Cirque du Soleil
- Genre: Contemporary circus
- Show type: Touring production
- Date of premiere: May 8, 1990 (Montreal)
- Final show: November 21, 1993 (Las Vegas)

Creative team
- Director: Franco Dragone
- Director of creation: Gilles Ste-Croix
- Set designer: Michel Crête
- Composer: René Dupéré
- Costume designer: Dominique Lemieux
- Lighting designer: Luc Lafortune
- Choreographer: Debra Brown
- Sound designer: François Bergeron

Other information
- Succeeded by: Saltimbanco (1992)

Nouvelle Expérience was Cirque du Soleil's fourth touring circus show, which premiered in 1990.

Before the show's conception, Cirque du Soleil attempted to revive one of its previous shows, Le Cirque Réinventé. The attempt was abandoned after a weak critical reception. Laliberté and Ste-Croix instead created a new show based on the plans that had originally been drawn up by Caron before his departure. Originally intended to be called Eclipse, they renamed the show Nouvelle Expérience and launched it in 1990.

Franco Dragone agreed to return—albeit reluctantly—but only if he had full creative control of the show's environment. One of the first things he did was to remove the curtain that separated the artist from the audience, so that they would both feel part of a larger show. Whereas in a traditional circus the artist could go past the curtain and drop his role, Dragone had created an environment where the artist had to remain in character for the full length of the production.

Although Dragone was given full control over the show, Laliberté oversaw the entire production. He was in favor of Dragone's new ideas. Inspired by Jules Verne's "La Chasse au Météore", Dragone's concept for the show was that the performers were playing the parts of jewels spread around the Earth.

Nouvelle Expérience turned out to be Cirque du Soleil's most popular show up to that point and would continue running until 1993. It spent one of those years at the Mirage Resort and Hotel on the Las Vegas Strip, seen by over 1.3 million people during its 3½-year run. By the end of 1990, the company was profitable again and was prepared to start a new show.

== Characters ==
- Flounes: The fallen angels. Dressed in browns and ochres.
- Devils: The spirits of disobedience. Dressed in reds.
- Corporation: The slaves of the world. Dressed in blue.
- Madame Corporation/Enterprise: Queen of the Flounes, and along with the Great Chamberlain, ruler of the Corporation.
- Great Chamberlain (aka Ringmaster): Madame Corporation's right-hand man.
- Everyman: Along for the journey is a man dressed in a suit who represents any one of us - Mr. or Ms. Everybody. He shows us our most profound fears and searches for authenticity and sincerity.
  - David Shiner, Geoff Hoyle and Rodrigue "Chocolat" Tremblay. (1990-1991)
  - Kenny Raskin, Gerry Regitschnig and Paul Vachon. (1992-1993)

== Acts ==
The acts of Nouvelle Expérience blended theatre, music, circus arts and dance:

- Contortion: Four women, clad in pink, take to a suspended platform. The four twist and bend themselves into unbelievable positions. (Performed to "Meandres" on the soundtrack)
- Korean plank: Madame and the Corporation approach a seesaw-like object in the middle of the stage. They begin to jump on the ends, bouncing the opposite performer into the air. Soon, they begin performing twists and spins, and even form towers by flipping acrobats onto other acrobats' shoulders. (Performed to "Bascule" on the soundtrack.)
- Solo trapeze: An odd introduction happens between one of the Flounes and the Everyman. Afterwards, a woman takes to the stage, and is lifted towards a trapeze. She begins a beautiful number above, while flounes and devils watch from below. (Performed to "Fixe", "Ballant", and "Baleines" on the soundtrack)
- Fil de fer: One of the flounes moves about on a wooden ball. He spins, dances, and jumps until the Everyman enters the stage. At this point, the Everyman and the Floune try to shake hands again, but this attempt is successful. They begin to dance until the four other flounes enter near backstage. They take the fifth floune's ball, do a little trick with a quilt, and it reveals a tightrope walker. The man jumps up onto his tightrope (which is five or so feet high) and begins to perform many tricks. The ringmaster gives it a try and fails miserably. The two switch off, and the ringmaster gets better and better until the two are performing together.
- Fanfare: A little parade led by Madame Corporation introduces the next act. (Performed to "Fanfare" on the soundtrack)
- Aerial straps: A muscular man approaches two leather straps hanging from the ceiling. He takes to the straps and takes flight. He spins, flips, and hangs to a lyrical cello piece entitled "L'oiseau".
- Trapeze: Six figures climb three rope ladders up to an unusual flying trapeze apparatus. There is one regular trapeze, a two-layered trapeze, and a Russian trapeze. They swing back and forth between the three, performing daring tricks. (Performed to "Azimut" and "Sanza" on the soundtrack)
- Foot juggling: Two beautiful oriental women take to the stage. First, one begins to spin umbrellas on her feet and hands. Soon, she is juggling the other girl, and the other girl is spinning cloths on her feet. (Performed to "Suite Chinoise" on the soundtrack)
- Russian bar/Trampoline/Korean cradle: Three acts are combined into one (Performed to "Eclipsé" on the soundtrack):
  - Russian bar – A 5-inch-wide bar held by two men across their shoulders, while a third bounces on it.
  - Trampoline
  - Korean cradle – Two men are strapped in on platforms, and take women by their hands to swing and flip them between one another.
- Balancing on chairs: A man dressed in white takes to the stage, a few chairs in his hands. He begins to stack the chairs and balance on them, along with a flaming birthday cake. (Performed to "Havi Vahila" on the soundtrack)

== Costumes ==
The costumes of Nouvelle Expérience were designed to complement the wood theme of the set. Dominique Lemieux, costume designer, combined many different styles for the highly theatrical costumes, which makes it difficult to pin them down to any specific period. Surprisingly, some of the costumes worn are lined with upholstery material which make them very heavy. For example. the Flounes' medieval-esque costumes, made of a mix of lycra, velvet, and satin, weigh over 9 kilograms (20 lb).

== Music ==
The show's original score was composed by René Dupéré and performed live by five musicians. The show featured one singer, Cécile Ardail, who sang for the balancing on chairs act as well as played one of the Floune characters. A studio album of the music was released in 1990 and again in 1993, the tracks of which are listed below. It features two singers, Francine Poitras, who sang only for the album, and Cécile Ardail. The track of the Fil de Fer act is the only one which was not recorded on the album. Nouvelle Expérience marked the first time Cirque du Soleil's music used an invented language for the lyrics (for song "Havi vahlia"), a tradition that has persisted in most of the company's subsequent musical scores.

1. Fanfare (Character Parade)
2. Méandres (Contortion)
3. Boléro (Finale)
4. Bascule (Korean Plank)
5. Fixe (Intro to Solo Trapeze)
6. Ballant (Solo Trapeze)
7. Baleines (Interlude)
8. Havi Vahlia (Chair Balancing)
9. Suite Chinoise (Foot Juggling)
10. Éclipse (Russian Bar/Trampoline/Korean Cradle) (1990–1991)
11. L'Oiseau (Aerial Straps)
12. Azimut (Trapeze)
13. Sanza (Trapeze)
14. Grosse Femme (Opening)

Additional songs in the show not included on the album:

1. Cinéma (Clown act) (1990–1991)
2. Danse à 3 Jambes (Clown act) (1991)
3. Cloche (Clown act) (1991–1993)
4. La Clarinette (Clown Act) (1992–1993)
5. Marche de Fil (Fil de Fer)
6. Trapeze (Trapeze) (Premiere Only)
7. Bars (Russian Bar/Trampoline/Korean Cradle) (Premiere Only)

=== Vocalists ===
- Cécile Ardail – From 8 May 1990 (Montréal) to 21 November 1993 (Las Vegas)

==== Other vocalists ====
- Francine Poitras (album only)

== Tour ==
Nouvelle Expérience began its grand chapiteau tour of North America in Montreal on 8 May 1990 and ended it in Las Vegas on 21 November 1993. The following colorboxes indicate the region of each performance: NA North America

=== Grand Chapiteau tour ===
==== 1990 schedule ====
- NA Montréal, QC - From 8 May 1990 to 17 Jun 1990
- NA Seattle, WA - From 5 Jul 1990 to 22 Jul 1990
- NA San Francisco, CA - From 1 Aug 1990 to 19 Aug 1990
- NA San Jose, CA - From 12 Sep 1990 to 30 Sep 1990
- NA Santa Monica, CA - From 12 Oct 1990 to 16 Dec 1990

==== 1991 schedule ====
- NA San Diego, CA - From 26 Jan 1991 to 10 Feb 1991
- NA Costa Mesa, CA - From 22 Feb 1991 to 24 Mar 1991
- NA New York, NY - From 11 Apr 1991 to 2 Jun 1991
- NA Sainte Foy, QC - From 20 Jun 1991 to 14 Jul 1991
- NA Toronto, ON - From 26 Jul 1991 to 1 Sep 1991
- NA Chicago, IL - From 13 Sep 1991 to 13 Oct 1991
- NA Washington, DC - From 25 Oct 1991 to 27 Nov 1991
- NA Atlanta, GA - From 29 Nov 1991 to 21 Dec 1991

==== 1992 schedule ====
- NA Las Vegas, NV - From 10 Nov 1992 to 31 Dec 1992

==== 1993 schedule ====
- NA Las Vegas, NV - From 1 Jan 1993 to 21 Nov 1993 (final show)
