= Hand to hand acrobatics =

Type of performance

Hand to hand acrobatics is a type of performance in which an acrobatic base and flyer balance on top of each other in either a gymnastic or acrobatic medium. It combines strength, agility, flexibility, and balance. For it to be considered hand to hand acrobatics, the top performer (flyer) must be making physical contact only with the base's hands, with the flyer's hands keeping them balanced. Positions the top can perform in this style of acrobatics are straddles, handstands, pikes, press to handstand, one arm handstands, planches, flags, and many others. Hand to hand acrobatics can also include dynamic catches and throws that either begin with a throw from a hand to hand position or end in a catch in the hand to hand position.

Hand to hand acrobatics has been used in a variety of contexts throughout history. These include circus acrobatics, acrobatic gymnastics, muscle beaches, acroyoga, and strongman competitions.

== Circus acrobatics ==
In circus shows such as Le Rêve or Cirque du Soleil: Worlds Away, hand to hand acrobatics have featured as an important part of the show. Often the circus will recruit gymnasts from sports such as acrobatic gymnastics because hand to hand acrobatics is such a big part of that sport.

Hand to hand acrobatics also appears within other disciplines in the circus arts. Aerialists, trapeze flyers, and contortionists often use hand to hand acrobatics. There are times when aerialists and contortionists perform alone, but when performing in pairs or groups, simple hand to hand acrobatics is often incorporated. For example, this may involve one person hanging from a hoop or curtain while holding another person in the air below them. In the case of trapeze artists, many of the throws and catches are hand to hand grabs, and handstands are often performed between throws to not only show strength but to give the flyer a short amount of time to collect themselves before being thrown across the stage again.

== Acrobatic gymnastics ==
According to Chrissy Antoniades, an acrobat who represented Team USA and is now working at The House of Dancing Water in Macau, China, acrobatic gymnastics is not a well-known sport. The routines are performed on the same spring floor gymnasts use for floor exercise competitions. Partner balances, tosses, catches, dance, and tumbling elements are all choreographed and performed to music. Working in groups or pairs, hand to hand acrobatics is especially stressed in the sport. While you are allowed to perform skills on other body parts, it is very common to see skills performed in the hand to hand fashion. This is true especially in the case of pairs—two athletes working together in a routine.

The first use of acrobatics as a specific sport was in the Soviet Union in the 1930s, and the first acrobatic world championships were in 1974. At this time many acrobats were not performing the same types of routines one would see today. Instead, for groups of four boys, they would have only one balance skill where all four of them are stacked on top of each other, and hand to hand acrobatic moves of the competitors choice were performed.

== Acroyoga ==
Acroyoga is a recent practice stemming from acrobatic gymnastics. It features hand to hand acrobatics in a similar way, but routines are not performed as in the sport. While hand to hand acrobatics is a small part in acroyoga, it is more common to do many different types of balancing positions.

== College campuses ==
A small group of college students perform hand to hand acrobatics in their own acrobatic competitions. Currently, only girls are allowed to compete in the sport. The sport resembles cheerleading more than it does acrobatics. Teams that compete come from Baylor University, West Liberty University, East Texas Baptist University, Quinnipiac University, University of Oregon, Hawaii Pacific University, Converse College, and Arizona Christian University.

== Strongman ==
In strongman culture, handstands are often an impressive feat due to the massive size of these men. While their form is far different from those in gymnastics, their hand to hand acrobatics resemble acts closer to what one would find in places such as muscle beach. California is a huge breeding ground for those types of athletes. Instructions from strongmen on how to perform handstands vary from what one would find in gymnastics, but they fall under the same category.
