= Aerial straps =

Aerial performance apparatus

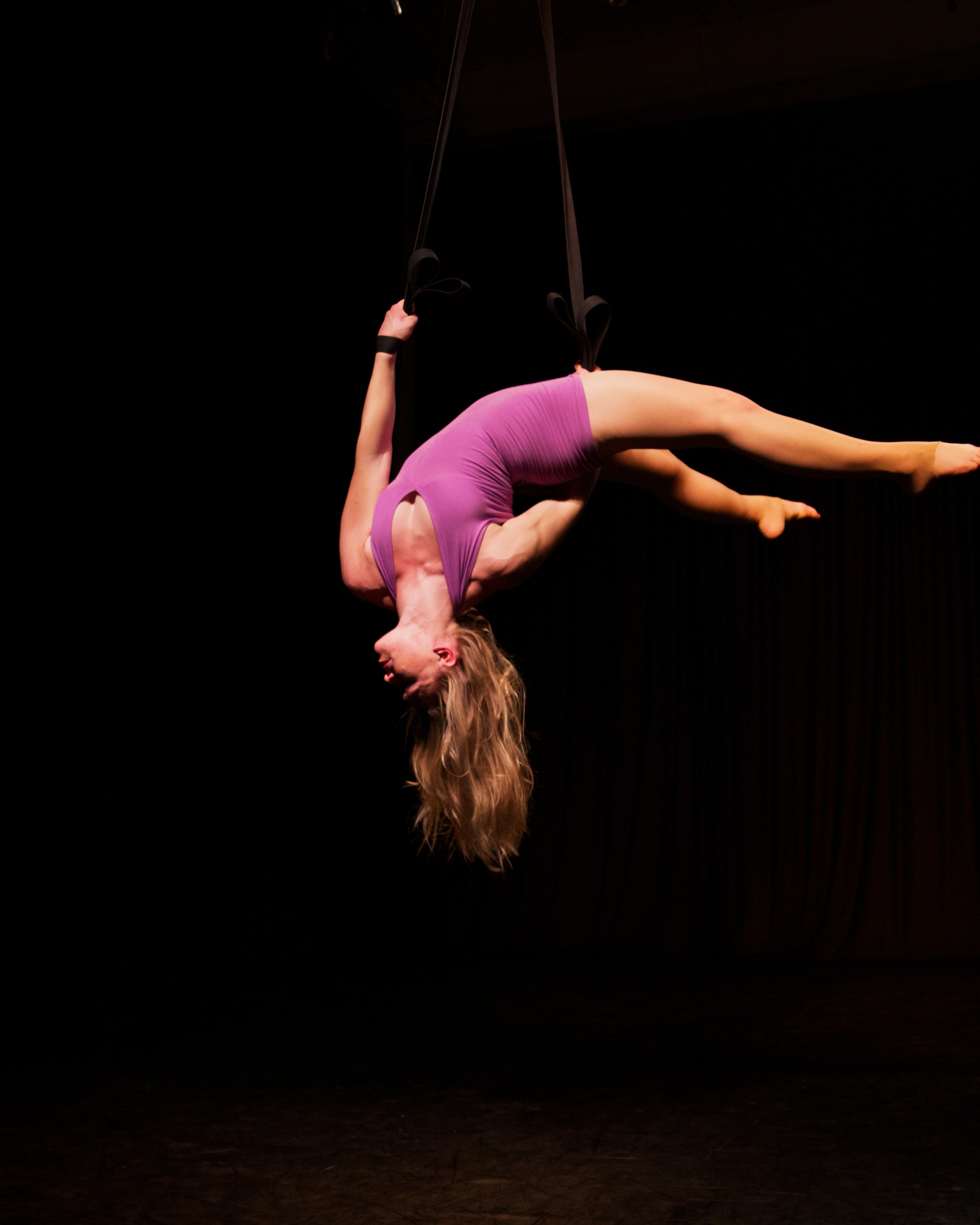
Aerialist performing on aerial straps

Straps, also known as aerial straps, are a type of aerial apparatus on which various feats of strength and flexibility may be performed, often in the context of a circus performance. It is a cotton, velvet, or nylon apparatus that looks like two suspended ribbons. Wrapping the strap ends around hands and wrists, the performer performs holds, twists, rolls and manoeuvres, requiring extreme strength and precision similar to men’s rings in gymnastics. Straps are available in various configurations, including those with various types of loops at the ends and those without loops. A straps act usually includes held poses and postures done on the straps, dance moves performed on the floor away from the straps, partner acrobatics done on and off the straps, as well as having the straps pulled up and let down during the act.

== The Panteleenko Brothers ==
The discipline of aerial straps was originally a Chinese specialty where athletes would perform intensely muscular tricks up and down the straps. Many of the moves are similar to those of the aerial rings. The pioneers of contemporary aerial straps were identical twins Yuri and Valery Panteleenko, known as the Panteleenko Brothers. The brothers started their performance careers as part of a Russian illusionist’s magic show. During a show in Rostov-on-Don in 1969, Vladivien Levshin, the Rubanov Company’s acrobatic coach, saw their athleticism and potential and began training them to perform what was to become a milestone act in the history of the apparatus. Previously, a straps routine would be performed from a static position, only moving up and down the straps. Levshin introduced swinging, circular, and two-person moves. These new elements, not to mention the brothers’ elegance and resemblance, added a new level of grace and beauty to the balletic nature of the apparatus. In 1972 the brothers debuted the act; in 1973 they won the Soviet Union’s All-Union Circus Competition. They subsequently began touring with the Moscow State Circus.

In 1983 the brothers performed at the International Circus Festival of Monte-Carlo but were largely ignored by the judges, receiving only the City of Monaco prize. It wasn’t until the early 1990s that the Panteleenko brothers’ style of performance gained wider acceptance. Today nearly all straps routines bear the mark of their original routine.

In 1989 Yuri died of a heart attack after a show. Valery continued on the Panteleenko Brothers act, taking on Igor Gruzen as Yuri’s replacement. They performed until 1995, when Valery retired from performing at the age of 50 to become head rigger for Barnum's Kaleidoscape, eventually retiring to Florida. Valery died of cancer in January 2006 but was succeeded by his son Maxime, who is still performing.
