= Jeffrey Hall (performer) =

Canadian dancer and choreographer

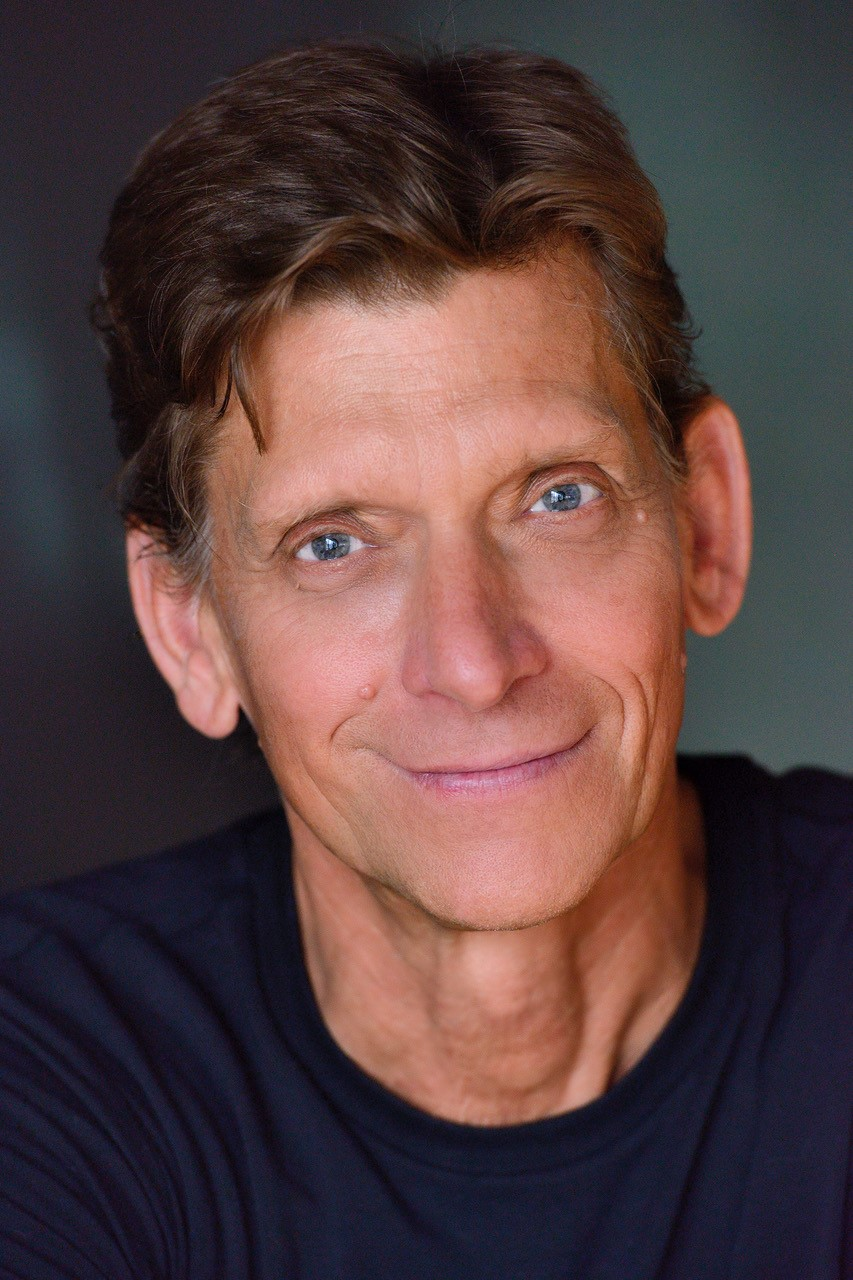
- Born: July 29, 1958 (age 68)
- Occupations: Choreographer, director, performer
- Years active: 1985-present
- Notable work: Totem (Cirque du Soleil) ZAIA by Cirque du Soleil The Beatles LOVE (Cirque du Soleil)
- Website: https://www.jeffhallchoreographer.com

Jeffrey Hall (born July 29, 1958) is a Canadian dancer, choreographer, director and stage artist with close to 40 years of experience. His work ranges from dance, theatre, film, television to circus arts and large-scale live entertainment productions.

Over the years, Hall's work has been seen by millions of people worldwide. Among other productions, he has worked on the choreography of several Cirque du Soleil shows, including TOTEM, as a choreographer, ZAIA, as a co-choreographer, and The Beatles LOVE, as an artistic coach. Additionally, he has spearheaded the stage direction of Devdan, a permanent show presented in Bali, Indonesia. He has also written and directed Circo Jumbo 2013 and 2014, two productions presented in several countries across South America. In 2022, he codirected and choreographed Netflix's The Queen's Ball – A Bridgerton Experience, an immersive show presented in several cities around the world. In 2023, he choreographed Robert Lepage's latest creation, Le Projet Riopelle.

== Early life and education ==
Hall holds a Bachelor's degree in Contemporary Dance from Concordia University, a Piano Matriculation from the McGill Conservatory of Music as well as a Film Directing Diploma from the National Institute of Image and Sound (INIS).

At a younger age, Hall was a freestyle frisbee player and won the Toronto Canadian Freestyle Frisbee Championships in 1989 and 1990.

He first took dance classes at Montreal's Concordia University in the hope that learning dance would help his frisbee style.

During his studies at Concordia, he met Pierre-Paul Savoie, who would become the founder of PPS Danse and one of Hall's long-time collaborators.

== Early career ==
Freshly graduated from Concordia, Hall created the dance duet Duodénum with Pierre-Paul Savoie. In this creation, Hall and Savoie "embody a duo of antiheroes who explore the psyche of contemporary males through a series of misadventures, injecting a dose of freshness, humour and social criticism into the Montreal dance world".

The dancer then toured from 1990 to 1995 with the production company Carbone 14, performing in both the show and the film Café des Aveugles, as well as the show Le Dortoir and its film adaptation by François Girard. He reunited with Carbone 14 as a performer in the 2001 creation Silences et Cris by Gilles Maheu.

In 1993, Hall created the dance duet Bagne with Pierre-Paul Savoie. The company PPS Danse describes the show as "a cry from the heart that speaks of the need for freedom and love, a metaphor for imprisonment, both physical and psychological, and a reminder of the very fragility of life".

Hall was also cocreator and co-artistic director with PPS Danse with Pierre-Paul Savoie. Their productions toured Canada, the US and Europe from 1993 to 2000.

In 1996, he cocreated the multimedia production Pôles with the same company in collaboration with visual artists Michel Lemieux and Victor Pilon.

== Falling ==
In 2002, Hall worked with Robert Lepage on the show Zulu Time. He was suspended in the air during a rehearsal. Due to a harness malfunction, he plunged 15 feet (5 metres) down to the ground. The accident crushed 90 percent of his spinal cord. The doctors assumed that he would never walk again.

Until 2005, he dedicated most of his time to learning to walk again, which he achieved despite his back leg muscles remaining paralyzed. His story was the subject of Falling, a 2009 short film by Philip Szporer and Marlene Millar. Hall adapted the film into a dance production also named Falling in 2012.

== Recent career ==
In 2003, Hall collaborated once again with Robert Lepage as a movement assistant on La Trilogie des dragons.

In 2005, his frisbee skills landed Hall a first collaboration with Cirque du Soleil as an artistic coach on The Beatles LOVE. Director Dominique Champagne was creating an acrobatic number that included frisbees and sought Hall's expertise for the development of the performance. The 45-second flying frisbee sequence was ultimately not included in the final version of the show that premiered in Las Vegas in 2006.

The collaboration with Cirque du Soleil turned into a long-lasting relationship as Hall was chosen as the acrobatic choreographer for the company's production ZAIA. Created in 2008 by Gilles Maheu, the show presented at the Venetian in Macao was Cirque du Soleil's first permanent show in China.

In 2010, Hall choreographed TOTEM by Cirque du Soleil. Written and directed by Robert Lepage, the show was seen by more than five million people around the world between 2010 and 2020.

In 2011, Hall staged Devdan, a permanent show presented in Bali, Indonesia. The show included 35 traditional Indonesian dancers and contemporary acrobats and thematically explored the diverse cultures of the five main islands of the Indonesian archipelago.

He wrote and directed Circo Jumbo 2013 and 2014, two different touring productions presented by Siete BTL Communications, which toured Chile, Colombia and Peru.

In 2022, Hall was hired as a choreographer and codirector for The Queen's Ball – A Bridgerton Experience. The immersive show produced by Fever, Netflix and Shondaland was inspired by the popular series broadcast by the streaming company. The show, which premiered in Los Angeles in March 2022 is currently on tour around the globe.

Robert Lepage sought the support of Hall as a choreographer once again for his latest creation. The show, which uses Le Projet Riopelle as a working title, is based on the life of Quebec painter Jean-Paul Riopelle and is set to premiere in Montreal in April 2023.

== Return to stage ==
After directing and choreographing shows alongside the biggest producers and directors in the world, Hall returned on stage in 2022 at 64 years old. He performed as a physical actor in Brigitte Poupart's show Until We Die, which is touring Canada and Europe in 2023 and 2024.

== Other involvements ==
Hall has taught and directed shows at the Circus School of Verdun, in Montreal from 1998 to 2007. He has also played in several TV shows including Galidor: Defenders of the Outer Dimension, Big Wolf on Campus, and Vampire High.

== Honours ==
Hall received an Iris Award for the short film Nord Sud Est West in 2005. In 2002, his co-creation Bagne won a Bessie Award in New York for Best Set Design. He won the Jacqueline-Lemieux Prize in 1996 for his choreography of Pôles and two Contemporary Dance Awards from Concordia University for the Most Outstanding Student in 1987 and the Highest-Grade Point Average also in 1987. Hall has also won the Toronto Canadian Freestyle Frisbee Championships in 1989 and 1990.
