= Ovo (Cirque du Soleil) =

Touring circus production

oVo
- Logo for Cirque du Soleil's oVo
- Company: Cirque du Soleil
- Genre: Contemporary circus
- Show type: Touring show
- Date of premiere: April 23, 2009

Creative team
- Writer, director, and choreographer: Deborah Colker
- Creation director: Chantal Tremblay
- Set and props designer: Gringo Cardia
- Composer and musical director: Berna Ceppas
- Costume designer: Liz Vandal
- Lighting designer: Eric Champoux
- Artistic guides: Guy Laliberté; Gilles Ste-Croix
- Sound designer: Jonathan Deans
- Makeup designer: Julie Bégin
- Rigging and acrobatic equipment designer: Fred Gérard
- Acrobatic performance designer: Phillipe Aubertin

Other information
- Preceded by: Criss Angel Believe (2008)
- Succeeded by: Banana Shpeel (2009)
- Official website

Ovo (stylized in all caps or as oVo) is a touring circus production by the Canadian company Cirque du Soleil that premiered in Montréal in 2009. Its creator and director, Deborah Colker, took inspiration from the world of insects. The idea for Ovo is not to be about the acts, nor dancing, nor insects, but about movement. The movement of life permeates the entire show, with creatures flying, leaping, bounding, and crawling. Composer Berna Ceppas brought additional life to Ovo with a score inspired by the music of Brazil. Ovo means "egg" in Portuguese and represents the underlying thread of the show. Graphically, inside the logo of Ovo, is an insect. The two O's represent the eyes and the V forms the nose and antennas.

== Set and technical information ==
The stage and set for Ovo were designed by Gringo Cardia and utilize irregular shapes throughout. The rear wall is 19 metres (62 ft) wide by 8 metres (26 ft) high and is only supported at the sides, thus allowing the trampolines for the final act to slide into place. During its arena tour, Ovo used the stage from the Cirque show Dralion. Inset in the wall are 24 "firefly eggs". These are molded fibreglass bulbs fitted with LED bulbs that can produce a full color spectrum of light. The "membranes" seen throughout the performance are quite large in scale, the largest being 24 metres (79 ft) wide by 17 metres (56 ft) high. The egg seen at the beginning of the show is inflated to 8.5 metres (28 ft) wide by 7 metres (23 ft) high.

Ovo has the largest flying act yet undertaken by Cirque du Soleil, as of 2010. To support it, eighty cables have to be installed during the performance. This requires the assistance of upwards of forty performers and technicians. The trapeze net itself is 3 metres (9.8 ft) off the ground and spans 30 metres (98 ft) in length and 15 metres (49 ft) in width.

== Cast ==
The cast of Ovo consists of three principal characters and numerous others in supporting roles. At its premiere, the makeup of Ovo included 54 performing artists from sixteen countries.

- Master Flipo: The principal character, he keeps everything in this chaotic world in order.
- Foreigner: The Foreigner, another principal character, is a fly from a faraway land who brings with him the mysterious ovo.
- Ladybug: Ladybug is the third principal, who brings life and joy to the world of insects and also ends up falling for the Foreigner.
- Dragonfly: The dragonfly flits throughout the entire performance and performs the hand-balancing act.
- Spiders: Four spiders provide mystery and caution throughout the show. Their acts include contortion and slackwire.
- Fleas: Three spry fleas jump about with flashes of red and yellow as they perform acro-trio.
- Ants: The ants carry kiwis and corn with them on their journey as they perform foot juggling.
- Butterflies: The butterfly duo flies through the air in a Spanish web (2009–2015)/ aerial straps (2016–present).
- Firefly: The firefly flits about, performing with diabolos.
- Mosquito: The mosquito adds character to the performance, while also being part of the powertrack, trampoline, and wall act.
- Scarabs: The strong scarabs fly through the air, twisting and spinning in the flying trapeze (2009–2015)/ aerial cradle (2016–present).
- Crickets: Ten crickets jump and leap about in green streaks as they do air track, trampoline, and wall.
- Creatura: A mysterious Creatura brings life to the party with his dancing.
- Cockroaches: Nine cockroaches are seen singing and playing music throughout the entire performance.

== Acts ==
Ovo has ten acrobatic acts, whereas the rest are dancing or supplemental to the storyline.

- Opening: The hectic insect world is portrayed by pounding samba music and bright lights, then a sudden calm; the bright lights change to warm natural light and the heavy samba is replaced by a calming guitar song.
- Foot-juggling and Icarian games (Ants): A group of ants juggle kiwis, corn, eggplant slices, as well as other ants, all on their feet.
- Hand balancing (Dragonfly): A lone dragonfly balances precariously on a high, rotating block.
- Tissue (Cocoon): Combining agility and grace, this soon-to-be butterfly performs a solo contortion on aerial silks, showcasing her theatrical metamorphosis.
- Duo straps (Butterflies): Two butterflies soar across the stage, strung on straps from the ceiling.
- Diabolos (Firefly): A firefly manipulates and tosses multiple diabolos at a time.
- Creatura (Creatura): A comic routine involving a giant suit that resembles multiple slinkys.
- Russian cradle (Scarabs): Based on Corteo's "Paradise" act, three aerial cradles are spaced diagonally above the stage, and fliers are thrown and caught in the arms of catchers in the cradles.
- Web (Spiders): One spider uses the same vertical rope as used by the butterflies to create multiple flexible poses, while another on the ground uses handstands to balance while her back and legs contort in multiple positions.
- Acro trio (Fleas): Two male performers use techniques similar to those in acrobatic gymnastics (acrosport) to toss a female performer in the air.
- Slackwire (Spider): On a loose (and sometimes swinging) wire, a spider balances with its legs and hands, and at one point rides a unicycle.
- Legs: A unique dance, multiple legs pop up through holes in the stage.
- Wall (Crickets): The crickets bounce on a long trampoline in the floor called a power track; they perform tumbling at an amazing speed. A trampoline is also used by the crickets to jump onto the wall. On the wall, they leap off and land on the trampoline.
- Banquete: The finale of the show.

=== Acts in rotation ===
- Aerial hoop (Mosquito): Two artists fly over the stage on a hoop suspended in the air in an energetic feat of acrobatics.

=== Retired acts ===
- Volants (Scarabs): Using two trapezes on either side of the stage, the scarabs are thrown onto a platform suspended above the centre of the stage, where they are caught and thrown in a banquine-style discipline. This act was replaced by aerial cradle during the arena conversion in 2015.
- Spanish web duo (Butterflies): Two butterflies swing and twist on a long vertical rope. This act was replaced by aerial straps during the arena conversion in 2015.
- Acrosport (Fleas): A group of five male and female fleas use acrobatic gymnastic (acrosport) techniques to toss other fleas in the air as well as create high towers of fleas. This act was replaced by aerial straps during the arena conversion in 2015.

== Costumes ==
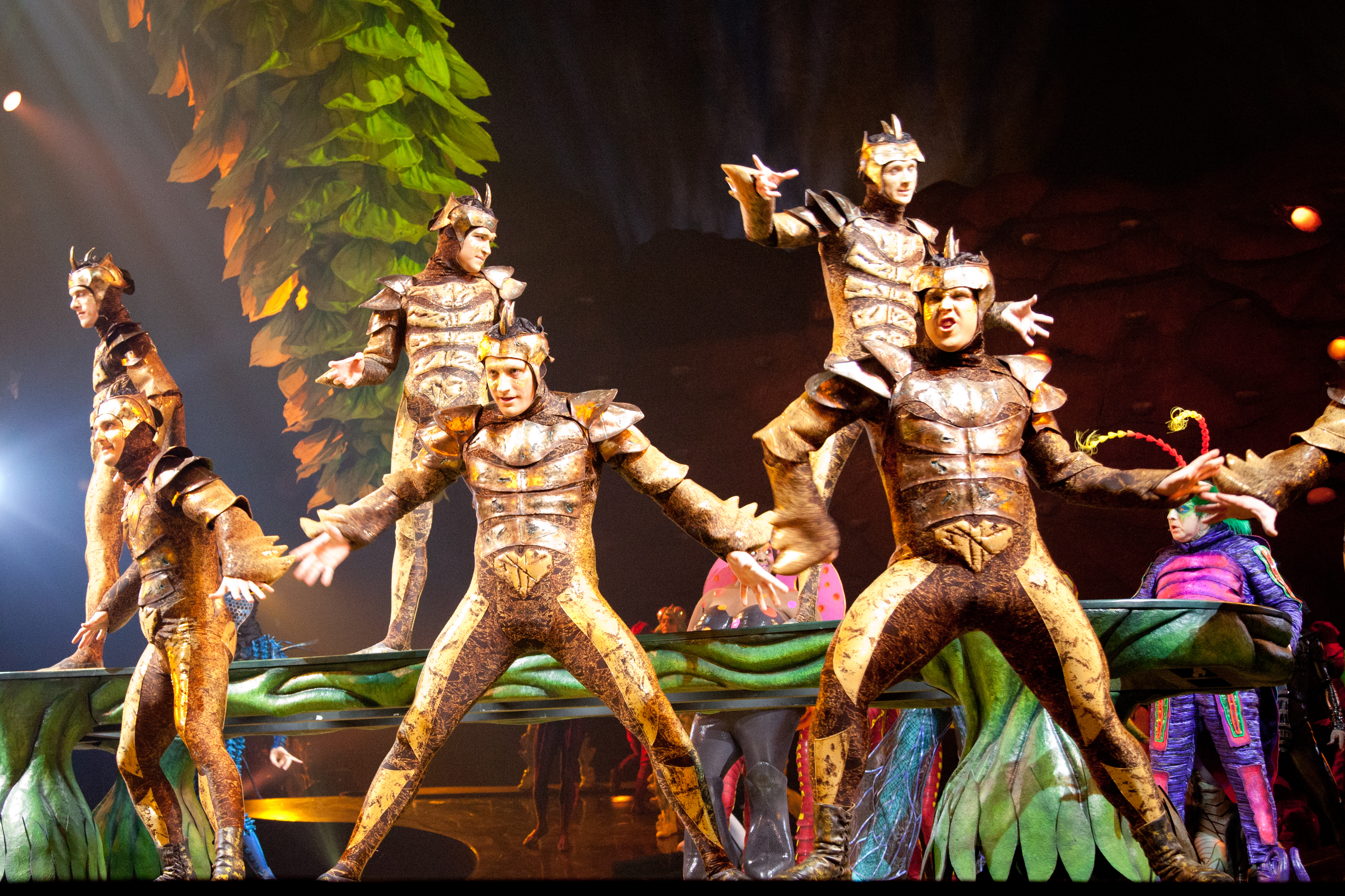
Liz Vandal's costumes for Ovo

The costumes in Ovo were designed by Liz Vandal and evoke the appearance of insects. The outfits were created to have areas that appear as sections to replicate the segmented bodies of insects. This was achieved by using permanent pleating, varying finishes, and coloring methods. To also provide the illusion of exoskeletons, a mixture of fabrics was used to create both hard and soft flexible fabrics, thus providing the look of a hard shell without inhibiting the artists' movements.

The crickets have detachable legs, which are removed for the powertrack act, to give the sense of an insect with six legs. The legs also provide the illusion that the cricket is oversized, aiding the spectator's illusion of being the size of an insect in this world.

Due to the rigidity of some of the costumes, most characters have two versions: the first is more lightweight and functional for their acrobatic performance. The second, on the other hand, is more richly detailed and heavier, and worn while not performing their act.

== Music ==
The show's musical influences stem primarily from Brazilian genres such as samba; both the creator and music director are Brazilian. Additional texture is added by the use of sounds of insects throughout the soundtrack. Below is a list of tracks featured on the CD, which was released in April 2010.

1. Brisa Do Mar (Pre-show and opening)
2. Foreigner (Cricket dance)
3. Ants (Foot juggling and Icarian games)
4. Cocoon (Tissue)
5. Frevo Zumbido (Diabolos)
6. Orvalho (Hand balancing)
7. Carimbo da Creatura (Creatura)
8. Love Duet
  - Spanish web duo (2009–2015)
  - Duo straps (2016-present)
9. Scarabee
  - Volants (2009–2015)
  - Russian cradle (2016–present)
10. Sexy Web (Web)
11. Legs (Interlude into Wall)
12. Flea Girls
  - Acrosport (2009–2015)
  - Acro trio (2016–present)
13. Super Hero (Slackwire)
14. Secret Samba Luv (Clown act)
15. Parede (Wall)
16. Banquete (Banquet and bows)

=== Vocalists ===
- Marie-Claude Marchand – From April 23, 2009 (Montreal) to June 27, 2014 (Tokyo)
- Alexandra Cabanilla – From June 28, 2014 (Tokyo) to June 7, 2015 (Sendai)
- Júlia Tázie – From April 8, 2016 (Lake Charles) to January 20, 2019 (Murcia)
- Lari Finocchiaro – From March 7, 2019 (Belo Horizonte)

== Tour ==
Ovo began touring in April 2009 in Montréal, Canada. They performed their 1,000th show on January 29, 2012, while in Santa Monica, California.

== Critical reception ==
Ovo got mixed reviews from critics. According to the Los Angeles Times, "'Ovo' may not be the best 'Cirque' show in the world, or even in L.A. at the moment. But its isolated instances of pure aerial magic are still something to buzz about." The New York Times wrote that "If you're judging Ovo just by the performance, you may leave feeling that the two-and-a-half-hour show has delivered only about an hour's worth of entertainment. But factor in the rest of the experience ... and perhaps you'll conclude that this isn't such a bad way to spend a few springtime hours after all."
