= Viva Elvis (Cirque du Soleil) =

Former Cirque du Soleil production

Coordinates: 36°6′28.50″N 115°10′37″W

- Logo for Cirque du Soleil's Viva Elvis
- Company: Cirque du Soleil
- Genre: Contemporary circus
- Show type: Resident show
- Date of premiere: February 19, 2010
- Final show: August 31, 2012
- Location: Aria Resort & Casino, Las Vegas

Creative team
- Writer and director: Vincent Paterson
- Creation director: Armand Thomas
- Musical director and arranger: Erich van Tourneau
- Set designer: Mark Fisher
- Costume designer: Stefano Canulli
- Acrobatic performance designer: Daniel Cola
- Acrobatic equipment and rigging designer: Guy St-Amour
- Original lighting designer: Marc Brickman
- Additional lighting design and programming: Martin Labrecque
- Image content designer: Ivan Dudynsky
- Sound designer: Jonathan Deans
- Props designer: Patricia Ruel
- Makeup designer: Nathalie Gagné
- Choreographers: Tabitha and Napoleon D'umo, Mark Swanhart, Catherine Archambault
- Artistic guide: Guy Laliberté, Gilles Ste-Croix

Other information
- Preceded by: Banana Shpeel (2009)
- Succeeded by: Totem (2010)
- Official website

Viva Elvis was the seventh resident of the Cirque du Soleil show on the Las Vegas Strip. It resided at the Aria Resort & Casino and premiered on February 19, 2010. The show closed on August 31, 2012. Cirque du Soleil partnered with Elvis Presley Enterprises to produce this show, similar to how they partnered with The Beatles' Apple Corps to produce the resident show Love at the Mirage.

CKX, the company that owns the rights to Elvis Presley's name, likeness, and music publishing, signed an agreement to have Cirque du Soleil create the Elvis-themed residency show. The gala premiere was originally scheduled for January 2010 on what would have been Elvis' 75th birthday, but was postponed until February 19, 2010. CKX and Cirque du Soleil eventually intended to develop additional touring shows and multimedia interactive "Elvis Experiences" throughout the world.

== Closure ==
Due to low attendance records for Viva Elvis, MGM Resorts asked Cirque du Soleil to replace the show. The show had its final performance on August 31, 2012. On March 7, 2012, Cirque du Soleil announced that following its second Radio City Music Hall engagement, the show Zarkana would be its replacement.

== Set and technical information ==
The Elvis Theater was designed with a conventional proscenium layout reminiscent of an opera house. The stage had 16 platforms, divided into 12 sections which could rise 10 feet (3.0 m); the widest section was 18 by 80 feet (5.5 m × 24.4 m) and was controlled by four large motors located 26 feet (7.9 m) below the stage.

The show's opening scene contained a jukebox made of chrome and gloss black which is 70 feet (21 m) wide by 22 feet (6.7 m) high. It also incorporated a 50-foot-tall (15 m) video screen. Also seen during the opening, a 29-foot-long (8.8 m), blue suede shoe weighed 7,000 pounds (3,200 kg) and was made of steel and fiberglass.

During "Got a Lot of Livin' to Do", seven trampolines were utilized. The entire structure took up the entire width of the stage, 78 feet (24 m), and weighed 30 tonnes (30 long tons; 33 short tons).

The set for the "Jailhouse Rock" scene was based on the technical requirements for a circus art called marche inversée. It had ten tracks that allowed acrobats to walk upside down, attached by their feet, while dancers performed right side up on other levels; the whole structure weighed 82,000 pounds (37,000 kg).

== Acts ==
The acts for Viva Elvis were staged to the music of Elvis Presley.

- Opening
- Blue Suede Shoes: Dance number with acrobatics
- Don't Be Cruel: Dance number with German wheel
- One Night With You: Aerial frame, performed on a metal-frame guitar
- "You'll Never Walk Alone": Interlude
- Saved: Dance number
- Got a Lot of Livin' to Do: Trampoline
- Heartbreak Hotel: Interlude
- Love Me Tender: Singing duet
- Return to Sender: Dance number with horizontal/parallel bars
- Are You Lonesome Tonight?: Aerial pas de deux
- Western Medley: Gun twirling and Lassos
- Burning Love: Band interlude
- Bossa Nova Baby: Balancing on chairs
- King Creole: Dance number with diabolo
- Jailhouse Rock: Dance number with acrobatics (Viva Elvis centerpiece)
- It's Now or Never: Chinese poles
- Can't Help Falling in Love: Interlude
- Love Me/Don't: Duo cerceaux
- Viva Las Vegas: Dance number
- Suspicious Minds: Acrobatic dance duet
- Rock Medley: Banquine
- Hound Dog: Finale
- Such A Night: Bonus Finale

== Costumes ==
Viva Elvis's costume designer, Stefano Canulli, drew inspiration from the iconic Elvis fashion of the 1950s and 1960s and added Technicolor lines to highlight the human body. The wardrobe collection as a whole contained nearly 400 costumes and around 1,500 costume components. Part of this total came from more than 450 pairs of shoes and 150 custom wigs. Cirque du Soleil, for the first time, used flocking to create some of the accessories, thus giving them a velvet appearance. Some of the several wigs used for the show were created using urethane foam, which gave them the appearance of Japanese manga.

== Music ==
The music for Viva Elvis was created in partnership with Elvis Presley Enterprises. The soundtrack album, which was released on November 5, 2010, was released under Sony Legacy Recordings and was produced by Erich van Tourneau.

List of music included in the show (In alphabetical order):

- All Shook Up (Banquine)
- Also Sprach Zarathustra (Opening)
- Are You Lonesome Tonight? (Aerial pas de deux)
- Baby Let's Play House (Gun twirling and Lassos, Trampoline)
- Baby What You Want Me To Do (Gun twirling and Lassos)
- Blue Moon (Aerial pas de deux)
- Blue Moon Of Kentucky (Gun twirling and lassos)
- Blue Suede Shoes (Dance Number with acrobatics, Banquine)
- Bossa Nova Baby (Balancing on chairs)
- Burning Love (Film montage and band interlude)
- Can't Help Falling in Love (Interlude)
- Didja Ever (Dance number with horizontal/parallel bars)
- Don't (Duo cerceaux)
- Don't Be Cruel (Dance number with German wheel)
- Don't Cry Daddy
- First In Line
- Follow That Dream
- Frankfort Special (Dance number with horizontal/parallel bars)
- Good Rockin' Tonight (Trampoline)
- Got A Lot O' Livin To Do (Trampoline)
- Heartbreak Hotel (Intelude, Banquine)
- Hound Dog (Finale)
- I am Roustabout
- I Don't Care If The Sun Don't Shine (Gun twirling and lassos)
- I Got A Woman
- It's Now or Never (Chinese poles)
- Jailhouse Rock (Dance number with acrobatics)
- King Creole (Diabolo)
- Love Me (Duo cerceaux)
- Love Me Tender (Singing duet)
- My Baby Left Me
- Mystery Train (Gun twirling and lassos)
- One Night (Aerial frame)
- Polk Salad Annie
- Return to Sender (Dance number with horizontal/parallel bars)
- Saved (Dance number)
- Shake Rattle And Roll (Trampoline)
- So High (Dance number)
- Such A Night (Bonus Finale)
- Surrender
- Suspicious Minds (Acrobatic dance duet)
- That's All Right (Banquine)
- Tiger Man (Gun twirling and lassos)
- Too Much (Dance number with German wheel)
- Treat Me Nice
- Trouble (Banquine)
- Trying To Get To You (Gun twirling and lassos)
- Viva Las Vegas (Dance number)
- You'll Never Walk Alone (Interlude)
