= Cité Mémoire =

Art installation by Michel Lemieux and Victor Pilon

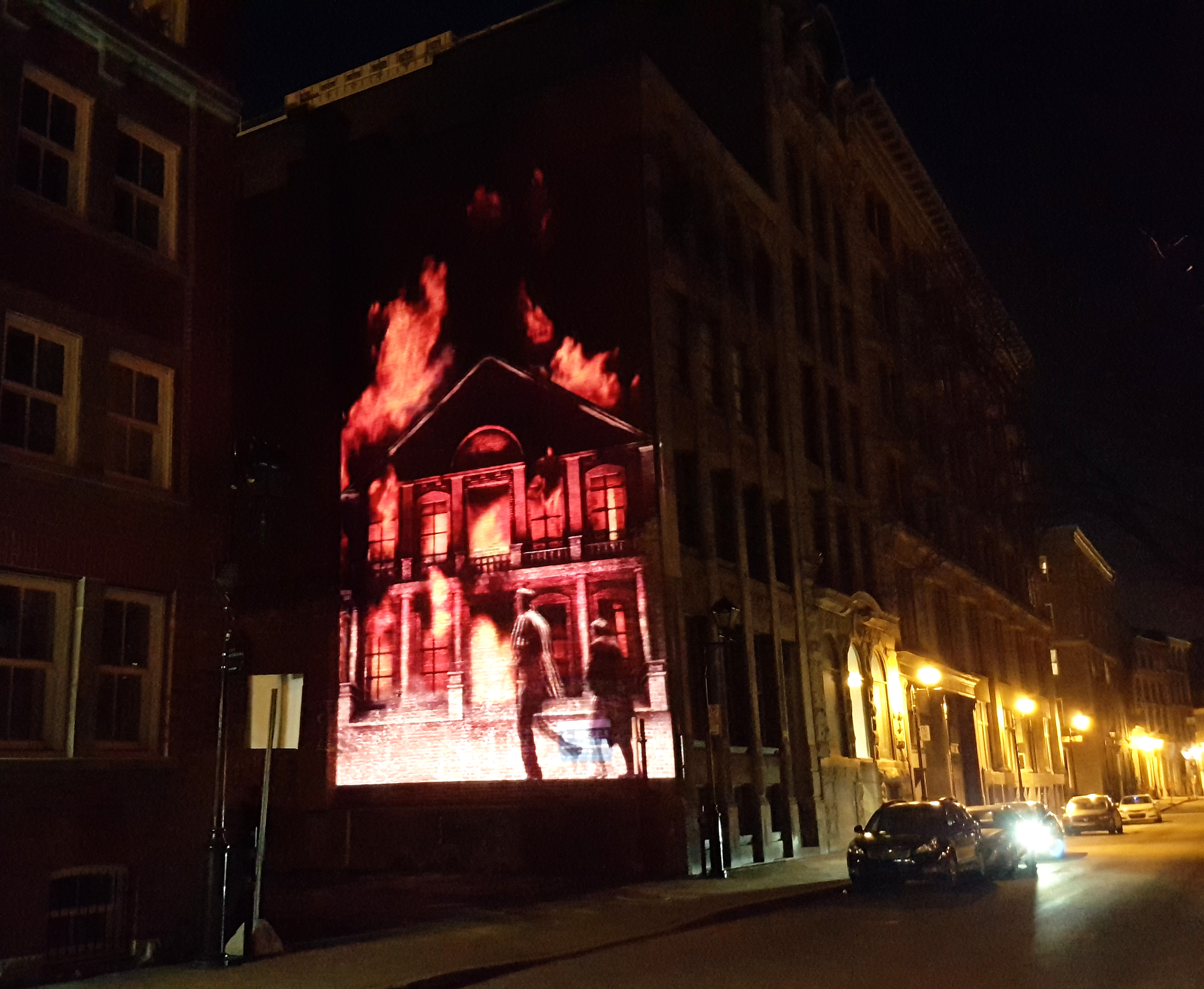
- Artist: Michel Lemieux, Victor Pilon
- Medium: Video projection
- Location: Montreal, Quebec, Canada

Cité Mémoire was an art installation created by Michel Lemieux and Victor Pilon, displayed in Old Montreal, Quebec, Canada. It was scheduled to last for four years, and featured 80 projectors creating images on old buildings. Cité Mémoire has been called the "largest such installation in the world". On the days when the projection was active, which varied during the year, it was available from dusk to close to the end of the day. The art installation officially ended December 22nd, 2024.
