= Liz Vandal =

French-Canadian costume designer (born 1965)

Liz Vandal is a French-Canadian costume designer known for designing the costumes for the Cirque du Soleil show Ovo. Her style, which is inspired by futuristic super heroes, insects, and medieval armor, was helpful in creating the costumes for Ovo, a show that brings different insects to life. Vandal was born in Montreal, Canada in 1965.

== Life and career ==
As a child, Vandal wanted to be a dancer, and in college she majored in computer science, but came back to fashion after "gaining some logic". She has a son named Leonard. Cirque du Soleil contacted Vandal twice before Ovo to design their costumes, but both times fell through.

She began her career as a fashion designer in 1988. She has designed costumes for several companies and organizations such as the National Ballet of Canada, the Backstreet Boys, and The Washington Ballet. In 1990, she began her long career of designing costumes for Édouard Lock, founder of the Montreal dance company La La La Human Steps. She designed for shows such as Infante c'est destroy (1991), 2 (1995), and Exaucé/Salt (1999). She also designed costumes for Lock's Amelia (2002), André Auria (2002), and Opéra de Paris and Amjad (2007). In 1992, at age 27, she founded Vandal Costumes with partner Yveline Bonjean, where they create costumes in the fields of fashion, theatre, opera, music and film, specializing in dance. The Backstreet Boys hired her in 2000 to design the costumes for their Black & Blue tour. In 2002, she designed costumes for the films The Lathe of Heaven directed by director Philip Haas and La Turbulence des Fluides by director Manon Briand. In 1997, Vandal and Bonjean of Vandal Costumes were nominated for Best Costume Design at the 18th Genie Awards for Night of the Flood, a 1996 Canadian film by director Bernar Hebert.

== Cirque du Soleil ==
Ovo is the first Cirque du Soleil show that Vandal has designed for. In an interview about her childhood fascination with insects, Vandal said: "Insects were here before we (humans) were here, and they will probably be here after we are gone, and we would die without them." Cirque du Soleil director Deborah Colker told Vandal that she wanted an evocation of the insects, not an imitation. Inspiration for the outfits came from French fashion designer Pierre Cardin's graphic lines and geometric shapes, Renaissance garments' slashed sleeves, and the pleating techniques of Japanese fashion designer Issey Miyake. From early 2008 to the spring of 2009, Vandal and the Cirque du Soleil team created 17 different insect costumes including a spider, a mosquito, a firefly, an ant, a butterfly, and a cockroach. The initial cricket costumes each took 75 hours to make. The first insect costume Vandal envisioned was the spider, for which she drew a real spider and turned it into a woman's body. Vandal used the Cirque du Soleil laboratory to develop her own fabrics and textile for the costumes to be sure that they were elastic enough for a great deal of movement. It was important to create the insect costumes in sections with stretchy material, allowing the performers to move easily. At first, Vandal considered using biodegradable materials for the Ovo costumes. But eventually she opted for the usual polyester and Lycra because their longevity made them more 'green' in the long run.
