= Delirium (Cirque du Soleil) =

Cirque du Soleil stage show

- Logo for Cirque du Soleil's Delirium
- Company: Cirque du Soleil
- Genre: Contemporary circus
- Show type: Touring arena show
- Date of premiere: January 26, 2006
- Final show: April 20, 2008

Creative team
- Director of creation: Gilles Ste-Croix, Carmen Ruest
- Creators, directors, set designers, and multimedia directors: Michel Lemieux, Victor Pilon
- Musical director, recording producer, arrangements, sound effects designer: Francis Collard
- Choreographer: Mia Michaels
- Lyrics: Robbie Dillon
- Costume designer: Michel Robidas
- Lighting designer: Alain Lortie
- Adaptation, research, design of acrobatic language: Catherine Archambault
- Prop and set elements designer: Anne-Ségun Poirier
- Sound designer: Yves Savoie
- Make-up designer: Nathalie Gagné
- Hair designer: Mario Huot
- Associate producer, musical content: Ian Tremblay
- Artistic director: Luc Tremblay
- Original music composers: Violaine Corradi, René Dupéré, Benoît Jutras

Other information
- Preceded by: Corteo (2005)
- Succeeded by: Love (2006)
- Official website

Delirium was a touring multimedia stage show by Cirque du Soleil featuring live music, video projections, and performances by acrobats and other circus performers. The production featured remixes of existing Cirque du Soleil music. The show premiered on January 26, 2006 and had its final performance in London, England on April 20, 2008.

Delirium was the first of Cirque du Soleil's productions designed to be presented in arenas outside Japan (first was Fascination in 1992, which was only presented in Japan); all the company's previous stage productions outside Japan had been toured with their own large, custom-built tent (referred to as the 'big top' or 'grand chapiteau') or were permanent shows performed in specially designed theatres. Delirium, as Cirque du Soleil's first significant experiment with arena venues, eventually helped pave the way for the company's subsequent show-by-show conversion of its older big top productions (e.g. Saltimbanco, Alegría, Quidam, Dralion, and Varekai) to a more cost-effective arena format.

== Set and technical information ==
Delirium's stage was set up on the arena floor, bisecting it lengthwise. Its two-sided, raised stage allowed for an alley theater-style presentation: the audience sat on both sides of the stage, at times able to look over the central stage to see the spectators on the other side. This presented unique staging challenges in that the most important actions had to be visible to both sides of the audience. However, the show could also be presented as a proscenium show, with the seats on one side of the arena left empty. In this case, the stage was set up closer to the sideline opposite the occupied seats, opening up a portion of the arena floor for additional seating. Despite the extraordinary complexity and size of Delirium's stage, it could be assembled inside an arena in approximately nine hours.

The ends of the stage were flanked by enormous projection screens, where real-time video footage from the stage performance was blended with prerecorded visuals. These end screens also served to block off a backstage area for the performers and technicians. Performers could enter the stage from behind the screens, from below (via several trap doors) and from above (via an elaborate system of motorized lifts). Two semi-transparent screens could slide out in front of the stage to turn both sides of the stage into a massive projection surface, roughly the equivalent in width of four IMAX screens.

Unlike most other Cirque du Soleil shows, where the musicians are situated to the sides or the far upstage area and are frequently hidden from view, Delirium's six musicians were often in plain view, and could be seen interacting with the other performers and various stage elements.

== Costumes ==
As the show's concept incorporated a contrast between stark urbanness and wild imagination, Michel Robidas (costume designer) drew inspiration from clothing from different eras, including the 1930s, 1960s, and 1970s, for the wanderers of the performance (i.e. the musicians), whereas bright colors and exuberance were emphasized for the acrobatic performers. For instance, a 25-meter "volcano dress" was made from 400 meters of blue organza and represented the sea; this dress incorporated small white and red lights. There were also purple or red and yellow whirling dervish robes, designed to look like tree roots, which started from the chest rather than the waist for a more dramatic effect.

== Music ==
Much of the show's music was creatively adapted from the original scores of other Cirque du Soleil productions, but remixed with a tribal beat and lyrics added or rewritten. The Delirium soundtrack first became available for purchase on June 15, 2006 through the Cirque du Soleil Online Boutique. It features the songs of the show, but not necessarily in the order in which they were performed.

1. "Cold Flame" (inspired by "Oscillum" from Varekai)
2. "Slipping Away" (inspired by "Ombra" from Dralion)
3. "Someone" (inspired by "Patzivota" from Varekai)
4. "Too High" (inspired by "Spiritual Spiral" from Dralion)
5. "Walk on Water" (inspired by "A Tale" from La Nouba)
6. "Alone" (inspired by "Querer" from Alegría)
7. "Climb" (inspired by "Le Rêveur" from Varekai)
8. "La Nova Alegría" (inspired by Alegría's title track.)
9. "Lifeline" (inspired by "El Péndulo" from Varekai)
10. "Bridge of Sorrow" (inspired by "Nostalgie" from O)
11. "One Love" (inspired by "Pokinoï" from Saltimbanco)
12. "Let Me Fall" remixed from Quidam
13. "Time to Go" (inspired by "Mountain of Clothes" from Alegría: The Film)
14. "Time Flies" (inspired by "Mer Noire" from O)
15. "Sans Toi" (inspired by "Querer" from Alegría)

The lead vocalists on the CD are Dessy Di Lauro, Elie Haroun, Jacynthe Millette-Bilodeau and Juliana Sheffield.

== Filmography ==
A film version of Delirium was given a very limited theatrical release, only in theaters on October 15, 18, and 19, 2008, in the U.S. and Canada.

== Tour ==
Delirium toured in arenas instead of under the grand chapiteau. This allowed it to play in many cities for much shorter periods of time.

The following colorboxes indicate the region of each performance: EU Europe NA North America SA South and Central America AP Asia/Pacific OC Oceania

=== Arena tour ===
2006-2008

=== 2006 schedule ===
NA Montréal, QC - From 26 January 2006 to 29 January 2006 (show première)
NA Albany, NY - From 3 February 2006 to 4 February 2006
NA Bridgeport, CT - From 7 February 2006 to 9 February 2006
NA Buffalo, NY - From 13 February 2006 to 14 February 2006
NA Columbus, OH - From 17 February 2006 to 18 February 2006
NA Toronto, ON - From 20 February 2006 to 21 February 2006
NA Detroit, MI - From 23 February 2006 to 24 February 2006
NA Indianapolis, IN - From 27 February 2006 to 28 February 2006
NA Kansas City, MO - From 3 March 2006 to 4 March 2006
NA Oklahoma City, OK - From 7 March 2006 to 8 March 2006
NA Houston, TX - From 10 March 2006 to 12 March 2006
NA Memphis, TN - From 15 March 2006 to 16 March 2006
NA San Antonio, TX - From 19 March 2006 to 20 March 2006
NA Little Rock, AR - From 22 March 2006 to 23 March 2006
NA Dallas, TX - From 27 March 2006 to 28 March 2006
NA Birmingham, AL - From 30 March 2006 to 31 March 2006
NA Atlanta, GA - From 2 April 2006 to 3 April 2006
NA Jacksonville, FL - From 6 April 2006 to 7 April 2006
NA Tampa, FL - From 9 April 2006 to 10 April 2006
NA Raleigh, NC - From 12 April 2006 to 13 April 2006
NA Tallahassee, FL - From 15 April 2006 to 16 April 2006
NA Orlando, FL - From 18 April 2006 to 19 April 2006
NA Fort Lauderdale, FL - From 21 April 2006 to 23 April 2006
NA Charlotte, NC - From 28 April 2006 to 29 April 2006
NA Columbia, SC - From 2 May 2006 to 3 May 2006
NA Greensboro, NC - From 6 May 2006 to 7 May 2006
NA Nashville, TN - From 9 May 2006 to 10 May 2006
NA St. Louis, MO - From 12 May 2006 to 13 May 2006
NA Minneapolis, MN - From 16 May 2006 to 17 May 2006
NA Des Moines, IA - From 19 May 2006 to 20 May 2006
NA Montréal, QC - From 16 June 2006 to 18 June 2006
NA Toronto, ON - From 23 June 2006 to 24 June 2006
NA Pittsburgh, PA - From 29 June 2006 to 1 July 2006
NA Atlantic City, NJ - From 7 July 2006 to 8 July 2006
NA Baltimore, MD - From 14 July 2006 to 15 July 2006
NA Worcester, MA - From 21 July 2006 to 22 July 2006
NA Hartford, CT - From 29 July 2006 to 30 July 2006
NA Charlottesville, VA - From 1 August 2006 to 1 August 2006
NA Cleveland, OH - From 3 August 2006 to 5 August 2006
NA Milwaukee, WI - From 19 August 2006 to 20 August 2006
NA Grand Forks, ND - From 23 August 2006 to 23 August 2006
NA Winnipeg, MB - From 25 August 2006 to 27 August 2006
NA Denver, CO - From 30 August 2006 to 2 September 2006
NA Las Vegas, NV - From 8 September 2006 to 9 September 2006
NA Phoenix, AZ - From 11 September 2006 to 12 September 2006
NA Los Angeles, CA - From 15 September 2006 to 17 September 2006
NA Fresno, CA - From 19 September 2006 to 20 September 2006
NA San Jose, CA - From 22 September 2006 to 24 September 2006
NA Los Angeles, CA - From 27 September 2006 to 29 September 2006
NA Seattle, WA - From 3 October 2006 to 4 October 2006
NA Vancouver, BC - From 6 October 2006 to 7 October 2006
NA Calgary, AB - From 10 October 2006 to 12 October 2006
NA Edmonton, AB - From 13 October 2006 to 15 October 2006
NA Portland, OR - From 19 October 2006 to 20 October 2006
NA Omaha, NE - From 24 October 2006 to 25 October 2006
NA Louisville, KY - From 27 October 2006 to 29 October 2006
NA East Rutherford, NJ - From 3 November 2006 to 4 November 2006
NA New York, NY - From 8 November 2006 to 9 November 2006
NA Uniondale, NY - From 11 November 2006 to 12 November 2006
NA Philadelphia, PA - From 17 November 2006 to 18 November 2006
NA Hampton, VA - From 21 November 2006 to 22 November 2006
NA Ottawa, ON - From 24 November 2006 to 25 November 2006

=== 2007 schedule ===
NA Detroit, MI - From 24 January 2007 to 27 January 2007
NA Grand Rapids, MI - From 31 January 2007 to 2 February 2007
NA Moline, IL - From 7 February 2007 to 8 February 2007
NA Minneapolis, MN - From 9 February 2007 to 10 February 2007
NA Fort Wayne, IN - From 14 February 2007 to 15 February 2007
NA Chicago, IL - From 17 February 2007 to 19 February 2007
NA Kansas City, MO - From 21 February 2007 to 23 February 2007
NA Green Bay, WI - From 28 February 2007 to 28 February 2007
NA Peoria, IL - From 1 March 2007 to 2 March 2007
NA Madison, WI - From 4 March 2007 to 4 March 2007
NA Indianapolis, IN - From 7 March 2007 to 9 March 2007
NA Ames, IA - From 10 March 2007 to 11 March 2007
NA Oklahoma City, OK - From 14 March 2007 to 16 March 2007
NA Charlotte, NC - From 21 March 2007 to 22 March 2007
NA Birmingham, AL - From 24 March 2007 to 25 March 2007
NA Shreveport, LA - From 27 March 2007 to 27 March 2007
NA Baton Rouge, LA - From 28 March 2007 to 28 March 2007
NA New Orleans, LA - From 29 March 2007 to 30 March 2007
NA Raleigh, NC - From 1 April 2007 to 2 April 2007
NA Miami, FL - From 5 April 2007 to 7 April 2007
NA San Antonio, TX - From 20 April 2007 to 21 April 2007
NA Corpus Christi, TX - From 22 April 2007 to 22 April 2007
NA Monterrey, MX - From 27 April 2007 to 30 April 2007
NA St. Louis, MO - From 4 May 2007 to 6 May 2007
NA Saskatoon, SK - From 10 May 2007 to 13 May 2007
NA Spokane, WA - From 16 May 2007 to 17 May 2007
NA Salt Lake City, UT - From 19 May 2007 to 20 May 2007
NA San Diego, CA - From 23 May 2007 to 25 May 2007
NA Phoenix, AZ - From 26 May 2007 to 27 May 2007
NA Little Rock, AR - From 31 May 2007 to 31 May 2007
NA Nashville, TN - From 1 June 2007 to 2 June 2007
NA Greenville, SC - From 6 June 2007 to 7 June 2007
NA Atlanta, GA - From 8 June 2007 to 9 June 2007
NA Charleston, SC - From 10 June 2007 to 10 June 2007
NA Richmond, VA - From 12 June 2007 to 13 June 2007
NA Buffalo, NY - From 15 June 2007 to 17 June 2007
NA Washington, DC - From 22 June 2007 to 24 June 2007
NA Manchester, NH - From 26 June 2007 to 28 June 2007
NA Boston, MA - From 29 June 2007 to 1 July 2007
EU Rotterdam, NL - From 13 September 2007 to 15 September 2007
EU Hamburg, DE - From 18 September 2007 to 19 September 2007
EU Helsinki, FI - From 22 September 2007 to 24 September 2007
EU Stockholm, SE - From 27 September 2007 to 29 September 2007
EU Oslo, NO - From 1 October 2007 to 2 October 2007
EU Mannheim, DE - From 5 October 2007 to 6 October 2007
EU Manchester, UK - From 8 October 2007 to 9 October 2007
EU Birmingham, UK - From 10 October 2007 to 12 October 2007
EU Sheffield, UK - From 13 October 2007 to 14 October 2007
EU Munich, DE - From 19 October 2007 to 20 October 2007
EU Vienna, AT - From 22 October 2007 to 23 October 2007
EU Prague, CZ - From 27 October 2007 to 27 October 2007
EU Budapest, HU - From 30 October 2007 to 31 October 2007
EU Cologne, DE - From 2 November 2007 to 3 November 2007
EU Zurich, CH - From 5 November 2007 to 8 November 2007
EU Pesaro, IT - From 10 November 2007 to 11 November 2007
EU Milan, IT - From 13 November 2007 to 16 November 2007
EU Turin, IT - From 18 November 2007 to 21 November 2007
EU San Sebastian, ES - From 23 November 2007 to 24 November 2007
EU Lisbon, PT - From 28 November 2007 to 2 December 2007
EU Madrid, ES - From 4 December 2007 to 9 December 2007
EU Valencia, ES - From 13 December 2007 to 16 December 2007
EU Barcelona, ES - From 19 December 2007 to 22 December 2007

=== 2008 schedule ===
EU Oberhausen, DE - From 1 February 2008 to 2 February 2008
EU Hanover, DE - From 5 February 2008 to 6 February 2008
EU Bremen, DE - From 9 February 2008 to 10 February 2008
EU Stockholm, SE - From 13 February 2008 to 14 February 2008
EU Turku, FI - From 16 February 2008 to 17 February 2008
EU Zurich, CH - From 25 February 2008 to 26 February 2008
EU Budapest, HU - From 29 February 2008 to 1 March 2008
EU Berlin, DE - From 4 March 2008 to 6 March 2008
EU Nürnberg, DE - From 8 March 2008 to 9 March 2008
EU Milan, IT - From 11 March 2008 to 13 March 2008
EU Turin, IT - From 15 March 2008 to 17 March 2008
EU Birmingham, UK - From 22 March 2008 to 23 March 2008
EU Liverpool, UK - From 25 March 2008 to 26 March 2008
EU Paris, FR - From 31 March 2008 to 2 April 2008
EU Antwerp, BE - From 5 April 2008 to 6 April 2008
EU Glasgow, UK - From 9 April 2008 to 10 April 2008
EU Belfast, UK - From 12 April 2008 to 13 April 2008
EU London, UK - From 18 April 2008 to 19 April 2008 (final show)

== Critical reception ==
Variety, "This Cirque du Soleil Live Music Concert needs less live music and more Cirque."

The New York Times, ""Delirium" has even less narrative than most Cirque shows; it's just the crazy dream of a character who spends most of the show dangling from a balloon, dancing along to the music and action that is below and sometimes alongside him."
