= Zarkana (Cirque du Soleil) =

Former Cirque du Soleil production

Coordinates: 36.1079°N 115.1770°W

- Logo for Cirque du Soleil's Zarkana
- Company: Cirque du Soleil
- Genre: Contemporary circus
- Date of premiere: June 29, 2011
- Final show: April 30, 2016
- Location: Touring; Aria Resort and Casino, Las Vegas, Nevada (residential starting October 25, 2012)

Creative team
- Writer and director: François Girard
- Creation director: Line Tremblay
- Set and props designer: Stéphane Roy
- Costume designer: Alan Hranitelj
- Composer and musical director: Nick Littlemore
- Choreographers: Debra Brown, Jean-Jacques Pillet
- Lighting designer: Alain Lortie
- Image content designer: Raymond St-Jean
- Sound designer: Steven Dubuc
- Acrobatic performance designer: Florence Pot
- Rigging and acrobatic equipment designer: Danny Zen
- Makeup designer: Eleni Uranis
- Guest creator and dramatist: Serge Lamothe
- Music guide: Elton John

Other information
- Preceded by: Totem (2010)
- Succeeded by: Iris (2011)
- Official website

Zarkana was a Cirque du Soleil stage production written and directed by François Girard. It began as a touring show in 2011 and was converted to a resident show in Las Vegas in late 2012. It premiered at Radio City Music Hall in New York City on June 29, 2011, and later toured to the State Kremlin Palace in Moscow and the Madrid Arena in Madrid.

The show was marketed as a reinvention of the variety show, with a story about a magician in an abandoned theatre who had lost his love and his magic. As he cried and begged the gods for her return, he was plunged into a world inhabited by surreal creatures. The title Zarkana is a fusion of the words "bizarre" and "arcana", referring to the strange aura and atmosphere of this place and its inhabitants.

Following Zarkana's successful run in Moscow, the show started residency at the Aria Resort and Casino in Las Vegas on November 9, 2012. The show replaced the Cirque du Soleil resident production Viva Elvis, which had closed in August 2012 at the Aria Resort. On April 30, 2016, Zarkana closed to provide space for a new convention hall at the Aria.

== History ==
To fully rehearse for Zarkana, Cirque du Soleil needed to find a facility large enough to accommodate a space similar in size to that of Radio City Music Hall. Lacking enough space at the Montréal headquarters, the company looked around North America for a suitable place. They chose the Amway Arena, located in Orlando, Florida. The crew moved into the facility on February 28, 2010, and stayed for a couple of months. Cirque du Soleil paid US$2,500 (equivalent to $3,578 in 2025) a day plus expenses to rent the arena.

== Set and technical information ==
The set consisted of three hand-sculpted arches which represented three of the four mutant characters. The first arch, which was also the largest, represented Kundalini, a snake woman whose world was populated by dozens of slithering snakes. It was decorated with more than 150 feet (46 m) of hand-painted resin “snakes” which started out as styrofoam sculptures that were used to create molds for the liquid resin. The second arch represented Mandragora, a plant creature whose vines had overtaken the abandoned theater; the arch was utilized as a video screen. It also had plant-like "arms" which extended to nearly 100 feet (30 m) in length. The third and final arch, decorated with technological gears and pulleys, represented both the Pickled Lady and the Mad Scientist whose experiments unwittingly created her.

Stéphane Roy drew inspiration from the Art Nouveau movement, Antoni Gaudí, Gustav Klimt, and René Lalique. Lalique's inspiration could be closely seen at the extremities of the acrobatic equipment. "Keen observers will also note that the shape of the hole through which Zark makes his first entrance reproduces the outline of Manhattan, while the moon above the stage marks the exact position of Radio City Music Hall."

The LEDs on the light wall, which measured 90 by 40 feet (27 m × 12 m), contained more than three million pixels. The second arch contained an LED screen comprising 118 separate panels. The stage itself consisted of a sliding platform which allowed for fast equipment and prop changes.

Radio City Music Hall is a national landmark and could not be altered in any way. Therefore, the set and props all had to be created in such a way that no anchors are used for any of the equipment. Everything brought in had to be self-supporting since nothing could be bolted in. This complicated the safety and security designs of the acrobatic equipment.

Below are a few additional highlights from the set design.

- The cradle stations used in the flying trapeze relied entirely on "hanger tubes" for their rigidity. The structure of the high wire number installed on the floor of the theatre's orchestra pit was freestanding.
- The walls on either side of the stage were covered with a representation of a patchwork of 1 foot (0.30 m) ceramic tiles, each one different and hand-painted with gold leaf on a fabric that allowed for transparency and onto which images can be projected.
- The video projection in the arch utilized infrared cameras so that the projections could interact directly with the performers' movements. This was also utilized for interaction of the fire used throughout the show, adding additional special effects in the projections.
- The Kabuki-style rope curtain was 60 by 33 feet (18 m × 10 m).
- The two Eagle’s-head bandstands were 28 feet (8.5 m) tall and weighed more than 9,000 pounds (4,100 kg) each.

== Cast ==
The cast of Zarkana included many artists, singers, and acrobats from around the world.

- Zark: Until 2014, he was the show's principal character, a magician who has lost confidence in himself and his powers. The character was initially played by Canadian singer Garou and later by Paul Bisson, from Montreal. The Zark character was cut in the 2014 revamping of the show.
- Lia: Zark's former assistant and dream girl. She was played by Canadian singer Cassiopée.
- Mutant Ladies: Four different women who try to seduce Zark.
  - Pickled Lady: The result of one of the Mad Scientist's experiments.
  - Mandragora: An incarnation of the ivy that has grown in the theatre.
  - Kundalini: A snake woman.
  - Tarantula: A spider woman.
- Movers (White Clowns): Ti-Boss (Evelyne LaMontagne), Chameleon Convict (Elijah Brown), The Ballerina (Daniella Rabello), Rag Doll, Mardi Gras (Jason Nious), Sleepy Clown, Le Pierrot, The Apprentice, Porter, Mad Scientist (Michael Duffy), Chinese Cook, Preacher, Dame Plume, The Bride (Natalia Shaenko).
  - The primary clowns included Hocus (Played by Daniel Passer from 2011 to 2013 and Maxim Fomitchev from 2014 to 2016), and Pocus (Played by Wayne Wilson from 2011 to 2013 and Jimmy Slonina 2014 to 2016).
- Jovians: Extraterrestrial creatures from the planet Jovia.
- Oracle: Communicates with the past and future. The Oracle performed the sand painting act.

== Music ==
Below are the tracks in order as they appear on the CD. Listed after each track title is the act associated with the track.

- 1. Antilia (About Time) (Opening)
- 2. Zawraq (Mystic Web) (Flying Trapeze)
- 3. Eridanus (Hands Up)
  - Ladder Duo
  - Freestanding Ladder
  - Chair Balancing
- 4. Caph (Kundalini Ver.1)
  - Aerial Hoop Duo (2011-2015)
  - Highwire (2011-2014)
- 5. Crysococca (Bag of Gears)
  - Wheel of Death
  - Teeterboard (2011 only)
- 6. Kuma (Flags) (Flag Manipulation) (2013-present)
- 7. Tarientar/The Archer (Clown Interlude)
- 8. Gienah (Serenity) (Russian Bar)
- 9. Rae (Libra)
  - Hand Balancing
  - Aerial Silks
  - Bed
- 10. Tourago/Guiram (Preshow)
- 11. Jarseate (Splash) (Juggling) (2011-2014)
- 12. Asteraw (Oh! Lia [Asteroids]) (Banquine) (2011-2014)

Additional songs in the show not included on the album:

- Juggling
  - Juggling (2014-present)
  - Rola Bola (2015-present)
  - Icarian Games (2016-present)
- Pickled Lady Birth (2011-2014)
- So Green (Rope Duet) (2011-2013)
- Straps (Aerial Straps) (2014-present)
- Flags (Flag Manipulation) (2011-2013)
- Hoops (Aerial Hoop Duo) (2015-present)
- Kudalini Ver.2 (Highwire) (2014-present)
- Third Kind (Cyr Wheel/Aerial Hoops)
- Remember (Sand Painting)
- Love Duet/Of Gospel (Finale) (2011-2014)
- Whenever (Finale) (Partial, 2011 only)
- Curtain Call (Banquine and Finale) (2014-present)
- Pickled Lady Funeral (2011-2014)
- A Phantom's Parade (Interlude) (2014-present)

== Acts ==
A group of artists and acrobats performed the acts which comprised Zarkana.

- Juggling: A performer juggled balls in the air and against varying surfaces to create sounds, and also tap danced.
- Aerial straps: A pair of twins flew over the stage and audience using only aerial straps and each other.
- Flag manipulation: A group of performers juggled and tossed around flags.
- Russian bar: Two men propelled an acrobatic flyer into the air with a long flexible bar.
- Highwire: Two men performed a daring high wire act while a fiery pendulum swung across their path.
- Cyr wheels and cerceaux: Seven artists performed in cyr wheels while others performed tricks in aerial hoops.
- Sand painting: An artist used a light table to tell a story through drawn images in the sand.
- Grand Volant: Twelve acrobats performed on three trapezes side-by-side. An aerial cradle and mini trampoline were also used.
- Wheel of death: Two men performed death-defying feats in a giant spinning "Wheel of Death".
- Handbalancing: An artist performed handbalancing skills on a slippery surface.
- Banquine: Fifteen artists performed banquine, involving human pyramids and aerial crossovers.

=== Acts in rotation ===
- Chair Balancing: A performer balanced on chairs atop a piano and atop a ladder.
- Ladder duo: A duo performed balancing maneuvers on ladders.
- Rola bola: A performer balances on a board atop a stack of rolling cylinders. (This act was used as a backup for juggling.)
- Icarian games: One performer lay on his back and flipped, twirled and spun another performer on his feet. (This act was used as a backup for juggling.)
- Double lyra: A pair of aerialists performed together on a single aerial hoop. (This act was used as a backup for the Russian bar.)

=== Retired acts ===
- Rope duet: A duet performed on aerial ropes. (This act was included only in the first Radio City Music Hall run.)

== Costumes ==
Slovenian designer Alan Hranitelj created the costumes for Zarkana. In addition to working closely with the artists to better understand their personalities and design costumes that would work well for them, he found it to be somewhat of a paradox to use so much white in the color palette, considering the darkness of the original version of the show. In order to incorporate the white color of the white clowns with the rest of the show's color spectrum, the team incorporated hints of color into the clowns' costumes, which are distinctly related to one of the acts. The acts of the show, in fact, were each assigned their own specific color, helping solidify the look throughout the show.

Hranitelj took inspiration from the 1920s, 1930s, and Art Deco movement to create the 250 costumes in Zarkana. Floral motifs (especially roses, which could be seen on Zark's top hat and cape) were utilized throughout the show to reflect the love and passion of the show's principal characters. The rose was utilized for Lia and Zark, and therefore red and pink were heavily used in their costumes. As red was a symbol of Lia and Zark's love, red was also utilized in the costumes for the Banquine act, as this act finally unified the two lovers. The fabrics chosen for the show included polyester and neoprene. Sublimation was used on the fabrics to create the colors and prints designed for the show.

Other highlights of the costume collection included the following:

- Kundalini's costume was fireproof because she performed close to fire-eaters.
- The Oracle's costume was influenced by Russian/French designer Etré.

== Accidents and incidents ==
On November 1, 2013, a male acrobat, while performing an act known as the "Wheel of Death", slipped and fell off the wheel during a performance. The performance was stopped and the artist was taken by ambulance to University Medical Center of Southern Nevada in stable condition.

== Tour ==
Zarkana began as a seasonal touring show, playing at Radio City Music Hall in New York, the Kremlin Palace in Moscow, and the Madrid Arena in Madrid. The show began previews on June 9, 2011, at Radio City Music Hall and premiered on June 29, 2011. In late 2012, the show was converted from a touring production into a resident show at the Aria Resort & Casino on the Las Vegas Strip.

The following colorboxes indicate the region of each performance:
EU Europe NA North America SA South and Central Americas AP Asia/Pacific OC Oceania AF Africa

=== Arena tour ===
2011-2012

==== 2011 schedule ====
NA Preview: New York City, NY - From 9 Jun to 26 Jun 2011
NA New York City, NY - From 29 Jun to 8 Oct 2011
EU Madrid, ES - From 9 Nov to 1 Jan 2012

==== 2012 schedule ====
EU Moscow, RU - From 4 Feb to 8 Apr 2012
NA New York City, NY - From 9 Jun to 2 Sep 2012

=== Residency ===
==== 2012 - 2016 schedule ====
- NA Las Vegas, NV - From 25 Oct 2012 (Preview)
- NA Las Vegas, NV - From 9 Nov 2012 to 30 Apr 2016 (final show)
