= Banana Shpeel =

- Logo for Cirque du Soleil's Banana Shpeel
- Company: Cirque du Soleil
- Genre: Contemporary circus
- Show type: Touring stage show
- Date of premiere: November 19, 2009 (Chicago)
- Final show: October 10, 2010 (Toronto)

Creative team
- Writer and director: David Shiner
- Director of creation: Serge Roy
- Set designer: Patricia Ruel
- Composer: Simon Carpentier
- Costume designer: Dominique Lemieux
- Lighting designer: Bruno Rafie
- Choreographer: Jared Grimes
- Sound designer: Harvey Robitaille

Other information
- Preceded by: Ovo (2009)
- Succeeded by: Viva Elvis (2010)
- Official website

Banana Shpeel was a touring stage show created by Cirque du Soleil which premiered on November 19, 2009, at the Chicago Theater. The vaudeville-based show was directed by David Shiner, who also created Koozå. The show lasted less than a year, only playing in Chicago, New York City, and Toronto. The show was cancelled in 2010, due to its poor reviews and many complications.

== History ==
The promotional posters of Banana Shpeel. Left: The modified artwork removing Ashford, Passer, Wilson. Right: The original artwork.

Banana Shpeel was plagued with misfortunes, including original cast members and show creators being removed from the project. Prominent Broadway actors Michael Longoria and Annaleigh Ashford were written out of the production, along with original composer Laurence O'Keefe. The show premiered to scathingly poor reviews from both amateur and professional critics, who found the show drenched in insipid humour and lacking in cohesion.

After its try-out run in Chicago during November 2009-January 2010 at the Chicago Theatre, the show moved to the Beacon Theatre in New York, originally scheduled for additional performances for March to April 2010. The show's opening was delayed as it underwent a huge revision process, delaying the show's opening in New York from February 5 to February 29, and was subsequently delayed twice more to March 17, and finally to April 29. The show had undergone rework, adding in new acts, actors, characters, and storyline. The changes included the removal of composers Scott Price and Jean-François Côté, who were replaced by Cirque composer Simon Carpentier. The two lead clowns, Daniel Passer and Wayne Wilson, were fired from the production, but were hired soon after. Thanks to the resultant delays of the retool, Ovo and Banana Shpeel were dueling shows in New York. Ovo would open first and receive much better reviews.

After much delay and misfortune, the show finally began its run in New York City on April 29, 2010. Once again, the show garnered an impressive array of bad reactions from the general public and media outlets. Neil Genzlinger of The New York Times wrote, "Should I feel guilty that, for me, the most satisfying moment of Cirque du Soleil’s Banana Shpeel came when a clown was riddled with mock machine-gun fire?". Banana Shpeel was scheduled to run at the Beacon Theatre until August 29, but the company shortened the run to end on June 27.

Despite the show receiving a poor critical reception, Cirque insisted on continuing to showcase Banana Shpeel around the country, announcing that it would embark on a national tour later that year, starting in Toronto. The company's president and chief executive, Daniel Lamarre, insisted that Cirque received no pressure from the Beacon Theatre and had voluntarily closed the show for a re-staging. The limited engagement of Banana Shpeel ran in Toronto from September 18 to October 10. Despite one positive review, the show again received a generally poor response. Though the tour had originally been scheduled to go on to play in San Francisco and the Orange County Performing Arts Center, the production's mediocre reception prompted Cirque to cancel its upcoming tour.

Despite any misgivings, a spokesperson from Cirque announced that the closure of the Banana Shpeel tour was done in order to "...re-evaluate the tour plan to determine the appropriate next steps", prompting an implication that the show may reappear in another form at a later date.

== Characters ==
Out of the 38 performers of Banana Shpeel, there were several main characters that drove the plot.

- Marty Schmelky: A brash, ambitious producer who is trying to put together a spectacular variety show. Performed by:
  - Remo Airaldi (creation)
  - Jerry Kernion (Chicago)
  - Danny Rutigliano (New York and Toronto)
- The Sidekicks: A couple of Schmelky's mischievous sidekicks. Performed by:
  - Wayne Wilson
  - Daniel Passer
- Clowns: A trio of badly-behaved clowns who crash the auditions spreading chaos in all directions. Performed by:
  - Claudio Carneiro
  - Gordon White
  - Patrick Valette
- Margaret: Schmelky's assistant, who is often under rule by her boss' loud yells. Performed by:
  - Shereen Hickman

=== Other characters ===
These characters were part of the creation process of Banana Shpeel, but were ultimately cut before the show opened in Chicago.

- Emmett: An innocent and romantic actor who has come to audition for Schmelky's new show. Performed by:
  - Michael Longoria
- Katie: A beautiful woman who Emmett falls in love with. Performed by:
  - Annaleigh Ashford
- Banana Man: A mysterious man Emmett encounters several times.

== Acts ==
Banana Shpeel had five different acrobatic acts, along with several dance and comedy acts in between to add a narrative element.

- Opening
- Tap Dance: Performed by Josette C. Wiggan and Joseph Wiggan
- Foot Juggling: Performed by Vanessa Alvarez
- Hand Balancing: Performed by Dmitry Bulkin
- Hand to Hand: Performed by Kelsey Wiens and Preston Jamieson
- Juggling: Performed by Le Tuan
- Contortion: Performed by Ayagma Tsybenova, Imin Tsydendambaeva, and Lilia Zhambalova
- Magic Show
- Finale

== Music ==
The development of the show's music encountered many complications. The music of original composer Laurence O'Keefe was written out of the production before the premiere in Chicago. O'Keefe was replaced by Jean-François Côté, who had previously worked on Corteo and Koozå, and Scott Price. After receiving negative reviews during the Chicago run, the show underwent rework, which included the replacement of Côté and Price with previous Cirque du Soleil composer Simon Carpentier.

Due to the major musical changes that often occurred in Banana Shpeel's history and its sudden cancellation, no plans were made to create a CD for the show, unlike most of Cirque du Soleil's other shows. However, during Cirque du Soleil's 30th Anniversary Concert, one song from the show was performed, revealing the name of the track used in the contortion number: "The Snake Dance".

=== Lead singer ===
- Alexis Sims - From November 19, 2009 (Chicago) to October 10, 2010 (Toronto)

=== Back-up singers ===
- Kathleen Hennessey - From November 19, 2009 (Chicago) to October 10, 2010 (Toronto)
- Melissa Schott - From November 19, 2009 (Chicago) to October 10, 2010 (Toronto)

== Tour ==
Banana Shpeel had a short tour history playing in theatres in North America.

The following colorboxes indicate the region of each performance: EU Europe NA North America SA South and Central America AP Asia/Pacific OC Oceania

=== Theatre tour ===
2009-2010

==== 2009 schedule ====
- NA Chicago, IL - Chicago Theater - From 19 Nov 2009 to 2 Jan 2010

==== 2010 schedule ====
- NA New York, NY - Beacon Theatre - From 29 Apr to 27 Jun 2010
- NA Toronto, ON - Canon Theater - From 14 Sep to 10 Oct 2010

==== Cancelled ====
- NA San Francisco, CA - Golden Gate Theatre - From 16 Oct to 14 Nov 2010
- NA Costa Mesa, CA - Orange County Performing Arts Center - From 7 Dec to 26 Dec 2010 (final show)
