= Love (Cirque du Soleil) =

2006 theatrical production by Cirque du Soleil

Coordinates: 36°07′16″N 115°10′31″W

- Logo for Cirque du Soleil's updated The Beatles: Love used from 2016 (the 10th anniversary) to 2024
- Company: Cirque du Soleil
- Genre: Contemporary circus
- Show type: Resident show
- Date of premiere: June 30, 2006
- Final show: July 7, 2024
- Location: The Mirage, Las Vegas

Creative team
- Director: Dominic Champagne
- Artistic guide: Gilles Ste-Croix
- Creation director: Chantal Tremblay
- Theatre and set designer: Jean Rabasse
- Costume designer: Philippe Guillotel
- Music by: The Beatles
- Remixed by: George Martin; Giles Martin
- Lighting designer: Yves Aucoin
- Sound designer: Jonathan Deans
- Dialog editor: François Pérusse
- Choreographers: Dave St-Pierre; Hansel Cereza; Daniel Cola
- Makeup designer: Nathalie Gagné
- Projections designer: Francis Laporte
- Set, props and puppets: Michael Curry; Patricia Ruel
- Rigging designer: Guy St-Amour

Other information
- Preceded by: Delirium (2006)
- Succeeded by: Koozå (2007)
- Official website

Love was a 2006 theatrical production by Cirque du Soleil which combined the re-produced and re-imagined music of the Beatles with an interpretive, circus-based artistic and athletic stage performance. The show played at a specially built theatre at the Mirage on the Las Vegas.

A joint venture between Cirque and the Beatles' Apple Corps Ltd, it was the first theatrical production with which Apple Corps Ltd. partnered. Love was written and directed by Dominic Champagne. George Martin, producer of nearly all of the Beatles' records, and his son, record producer Giles Martin, were credited as music directors. A soundtrack album of the show was released in November 2006.

On April 10, 2024, Cirque du Soleil announced that the show was ending with a final performance on July 7, Ringo Starr’s 84th birthday. The Mirage will be redeveloped as Hard Rock Las Vegas, reopening in 2027. The Love Theatre will not be rebuilt in the new hotel, and no plans have been announced to reboot Love elsewhere.

== History ==
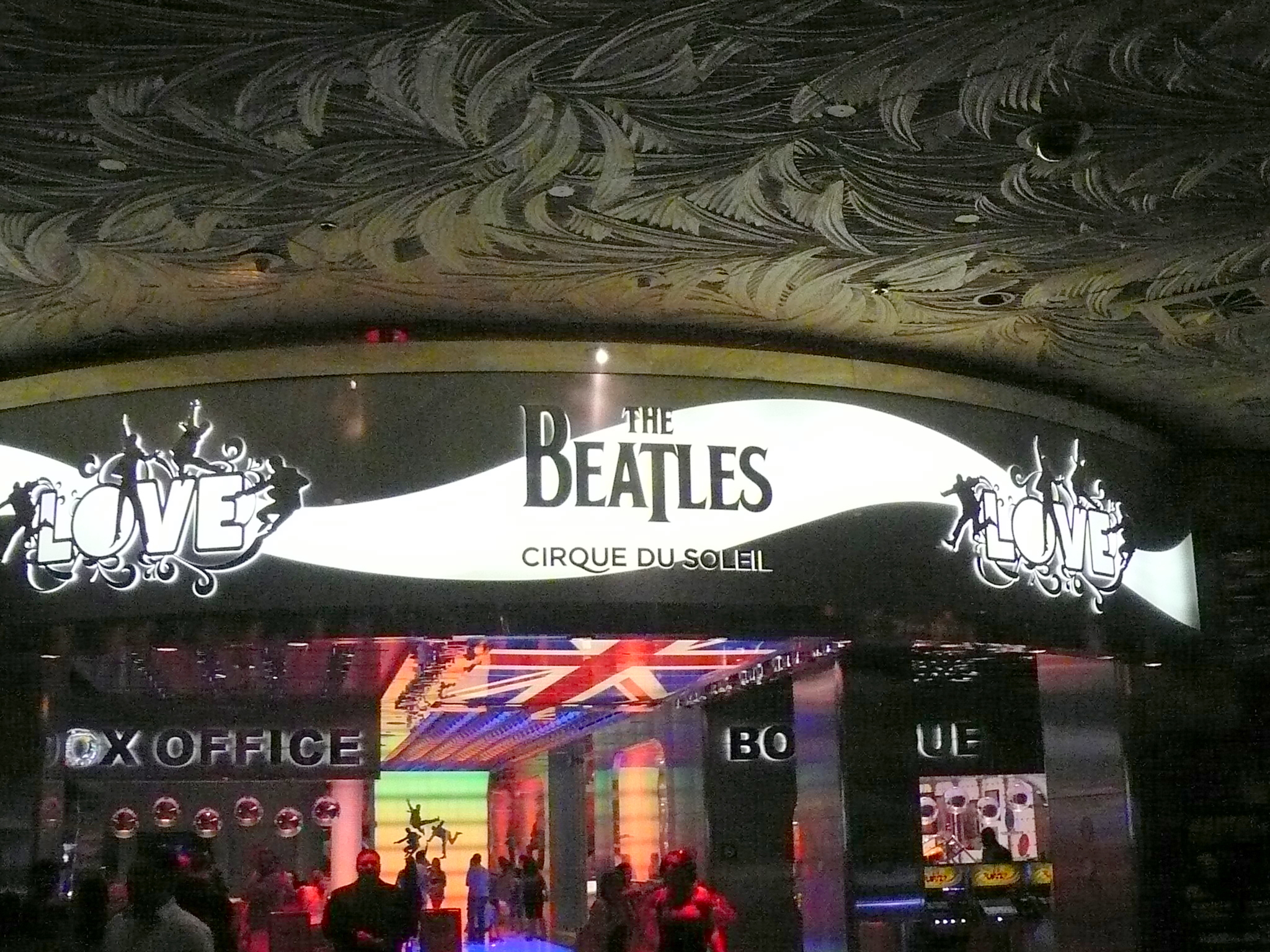
Love Theatre at the Mirage Hotel

The project arose from discussions in 2000 between George Harrison and his friend Guy Laliberté, one of Cirque's founders. Three years of negotiations between surviving band members Paul McCartney and Ringo Starr, Beatles widows Olivia Harrison (representing George Harrison) and Yoko Ono (representing John Lennon), as well as Beatles' holding company Apple Corps Ltd. and the Mirage culminated in an agreement.

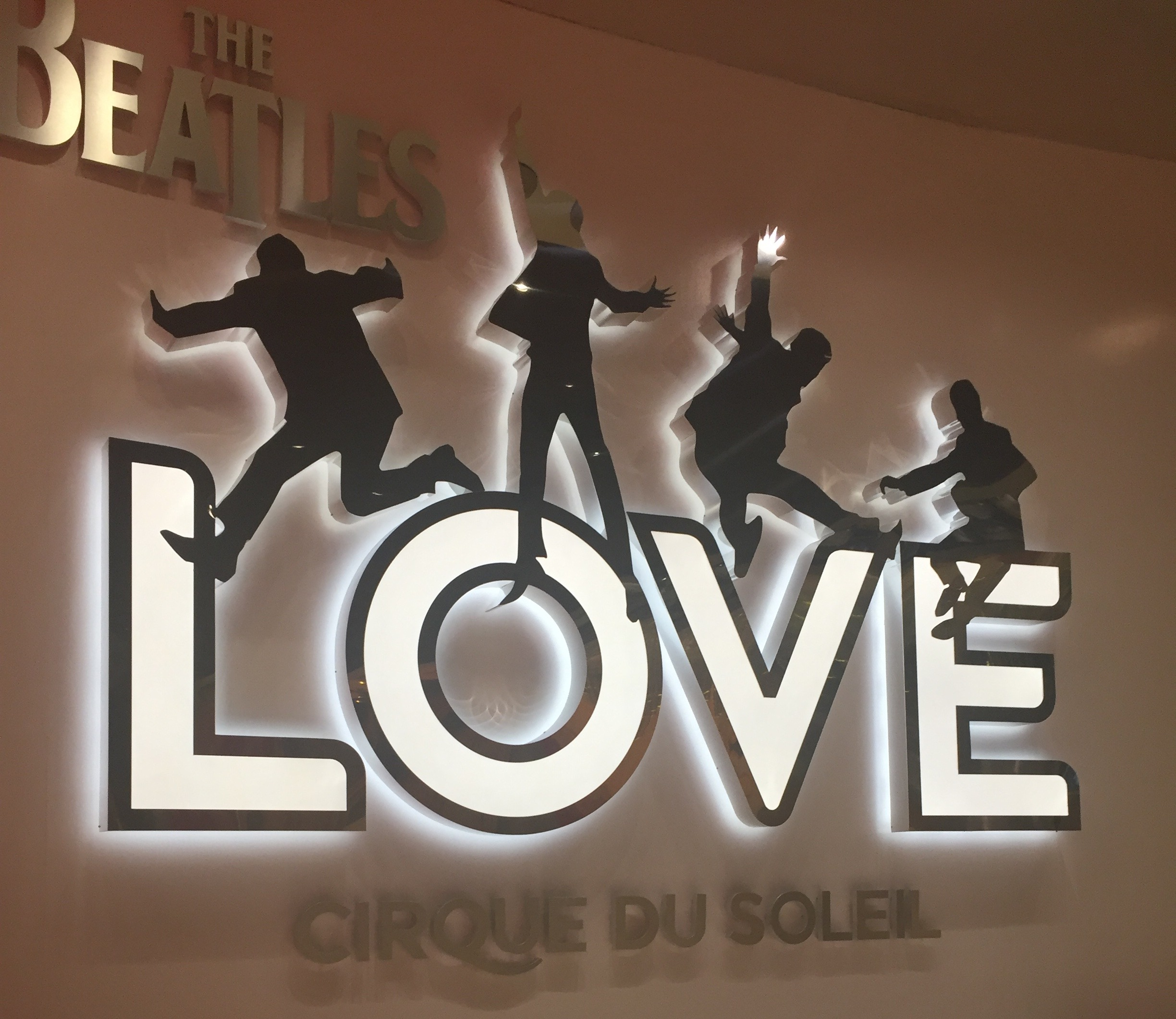
Love sign at the Mirage Hotel

The first executive producer was Neil Aspinall, then-manager of Apple Corps Ltd. Dominic Champagne shared show concept creator credit with Gilles Ste-Croix (a founder of Cirque). The creation director was Chantal Tremblay.

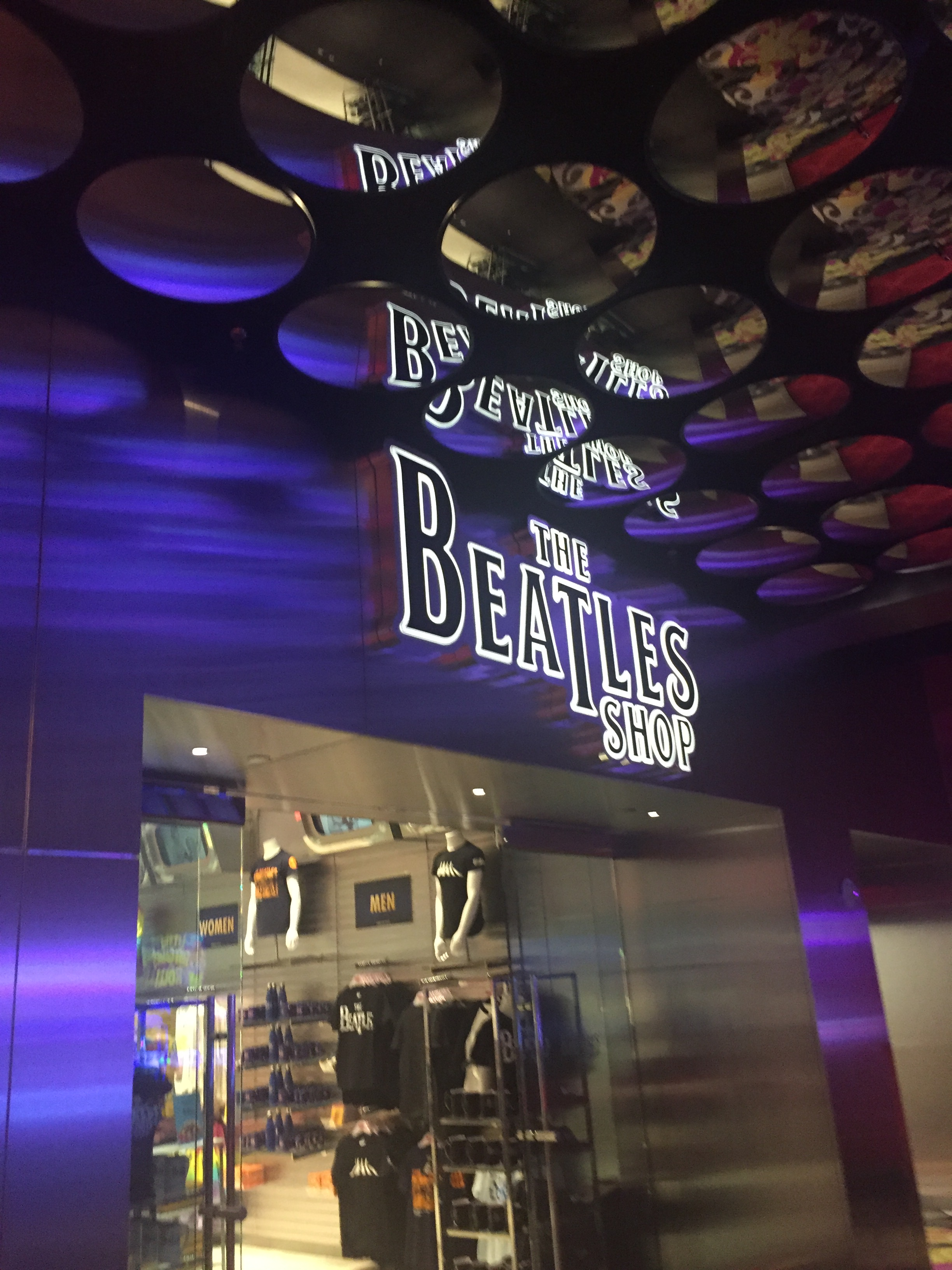
Beatles shop at the Mirage Hotel

Tickets went on sale April 19, 2006. Preview performances ran from June 2 to June 29. In attendance at the gala opening on June 30 were McCartney, Starr, Ono, Cynthia Lennon, Julian Lennon, Olivia and Dhani Harrison, and George Martin. It was the biggest reunion of the Beatles' 'family' since the band's breakup. At the end of the show, McCartney, Starr, Olivia, Ono, and Martin went onstage.

On June 26, 2007, key parties met for the first anniversary of the show at the Mirage. McCartney, Starr, Olivia and Ono were interviewed by CNN's Larry King shortly before the show began. The group unveiled a plaque at the Mirage Hotel in Las Vegas in memory of John Lennon and George Harrison.

Starting in late October 2010, Cirque du Soleil offered backstage tours of the Love Theatre. The experience allowed visitors to see the backstage wings, training rooms, costume workshop, and break area and go up to a catwalk into the sound and lighting booths. Not every experience was the same; the tour was conducted around a "regular day", so performers may have been training, rehearsing, or working out.

Leading up to the show's 10th anniversary in July 2016, producers updated the production, making changes to imagery, costumes, and acts, as well as adding and removing some music.

Due to the COVID-19 pandemic, the show was shut down from March 2020 until August 2021.

== Set and technical information ==
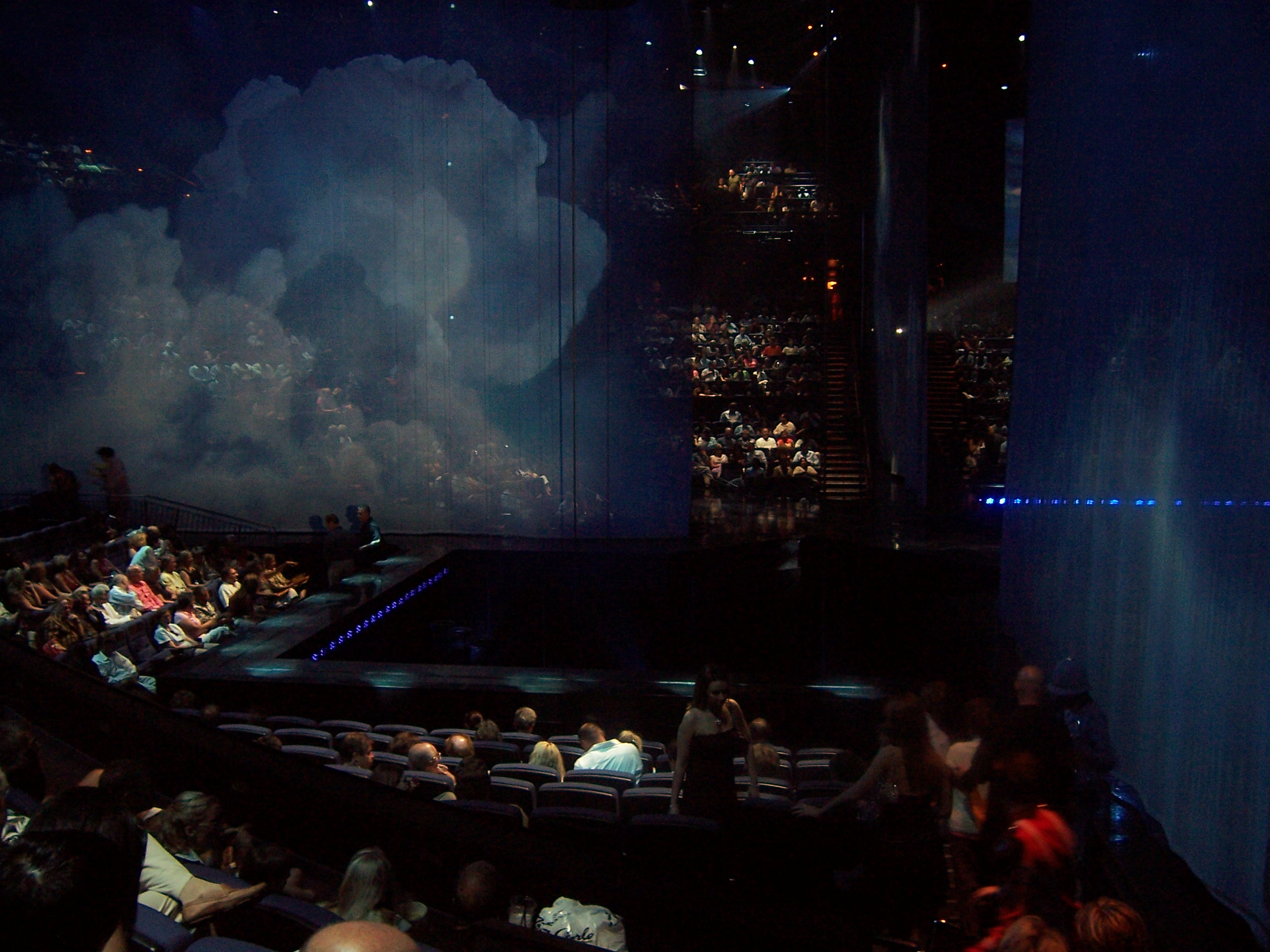
The Love stage moments before start of show; two of the scrims can be seen.

Created by French designer Jean Rabasse, the Love Theatre at the Mirage housed 6,351 speakers and 2,013 seats set around a central stage. Each seat was fitted with three speakers, including a pair in the headrest. The sound system was designed by Jonathan Deans. The stage included 11 lifts, 4 traps, and 13 automated tracks and trolleys. Each lift was capable of lifting 20,000 pounds.

The Love Theatre featured 32 digital projectors. Video was digital from source-to-screen with high-definition 100’-wide panoramic images. Digital displays on two walls above the audience emphasized elements of the show and provided transitions. High-definition projectors also created enormous images (designed by Francis Laporte) on four translucent screens that could be unfurled to divide the auditorium.

The Love Theatre, which replaced the Siegfried & Roy theater at the Mirage, was said to have cost more than $100 million. The venue was set up as a circular theatre in the round with seats 360 degrees around the stage. There were four balconies, and the furthest seat was only 98 feet from the center of the stage. The closest seat was 23 feet, 4 inches from the center of the stage and 2 feet, 9 inches from the edge of the stage.

== Storyline ==
The loose story of the production traced the Beatles' biography in broad strokes from the Blitz through the band's founding and climb into superstardom, their psychedelic and spiritual works, and their break-up in 1970. The finale was a joyous celebration of The Beatles' "reunion" that the show itself represented.

Love traced this path without relying on literal or historical representations of individual people. Instead, its landscape was inhabited by numerous characters plucked from the Beatles' lyrics. Sgt. Pepper, a central figure, encountered such characters as Lucy in the Sky, Eleanor Rigby, Lady Madonna, and Mr. Kite. In exceptions to this stylistic choice, the "Here Comes the Sun" scene featured a character resembling Krishna, and several scenes included mop-topped, dark-haired figures in black suits who resembled the early Beatles. The international cast totaled 65 performers.

== Characters ==
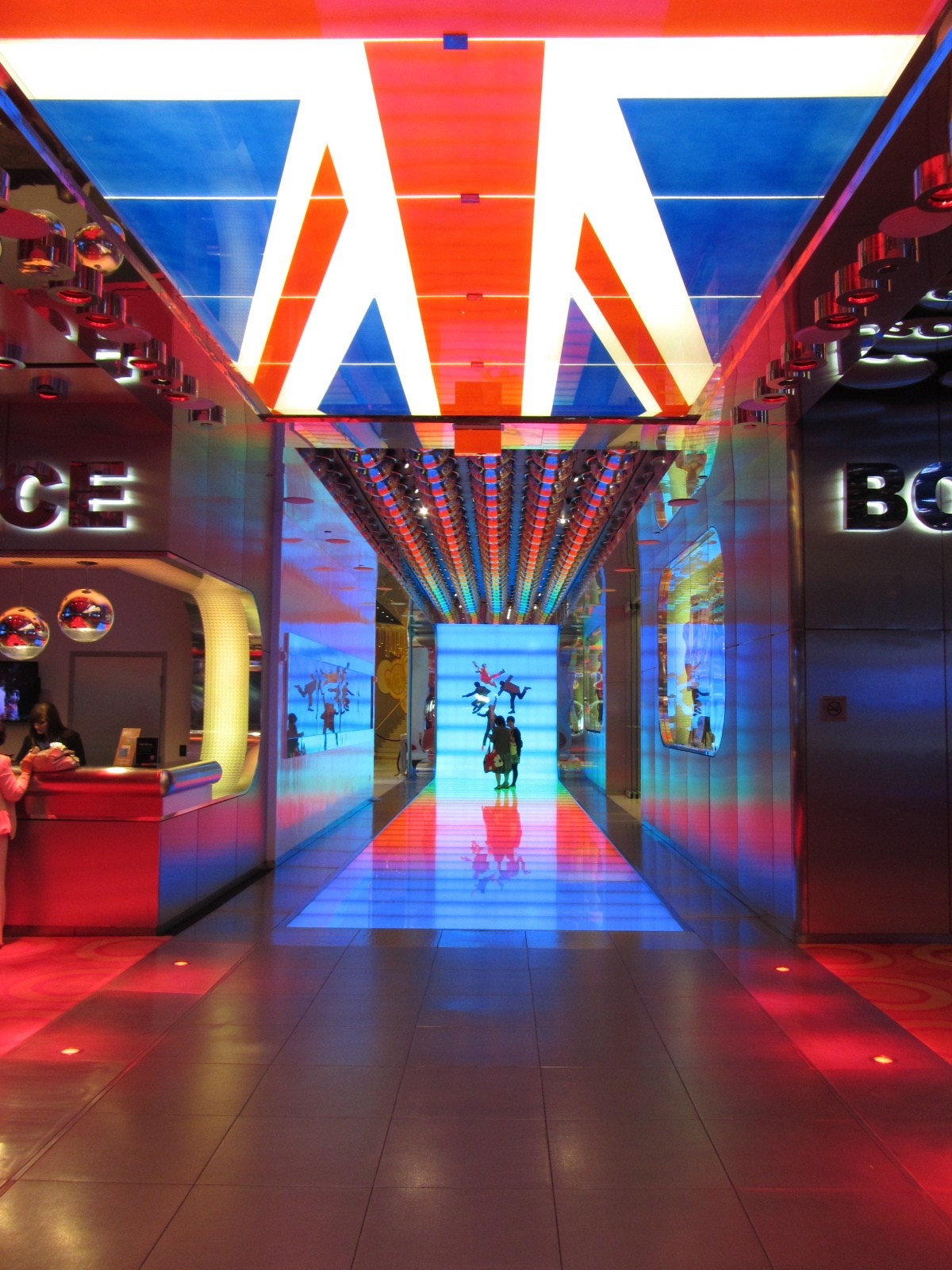
Love entrance at the Mirage

Love had a plethora of characters inspired by the music of the Beatles.

- Doctor Robert, the host of Love
- Eleanor Rigby, an English woman
- Father McKenzie, a preacher from older times
- Fool, a strange man on roller skates
- Groupies, unrelenting fans of the Beatles
- Her Majesty, a symbol of pride for the nation, often seen in a large oval frame
- Julia, evoking John Lennon's mother, Julia Lennon
- Mr. Kite and Helter Skelter
- Kids of Liverpool
- Krishna, uniting the cultures and sounds of East and West
- Lady Madonna, representing motherhood
- Lucy and the Fireman, a duo of lovers
- Mr. Piggy, representing traditional values of the aristocracy
- Nowhere Men, representing the zeitgeist of Love. Four characters comprised the Nowhere men: Pink Nowhere man, Dr Robert, the Fool, and Eggman
- Nurses, the caregiving stagehands of Love
- Sailors
- Sgt. Pepper, a circus ringmaster-like character
- Sugar Plum Fairy, a charming disc jockey
- Teddy Boys
- Eggman, a breakdancer

== Acts ==
Love featured elaborate choreography and various acrobatic and aerial performances.

- Come Together
- Get Back - Bungee
- Solo Bar
- Trapeze
- Here Comes the Sun - rope contortion
- Aerial Russian swing (Kris Carrison)
- Sgt. Pepper - Korean rope
- Back in the U.S.S.R. - Trampoline
- Latex rope
- Help! - Skater
- Spanish web
- Free running

== Costumes ==
Philippe Guilottel, Love's costume designer, wanted to infuse the same spirit of the Beatles into the costumes for Love. Many garbs included juxtaposed elements such as traditional and Victorian fashions combined with colorful, imaginative designs. Many of the costumes were highly sophisticated and voluminous, almost as if taken from a cartoon. For example, Savile Row tailoring traditions were utilized for the Sgt. Pepper Parade, turning the outfits inside out.

== Music ==
Unlike most other Cirque productions, which feature live music, Love used prerecorded material from the Beatles' catalog. Many of the original Abbey Road Studios recording session tapes were re-orchestrated and inspired the show's dance, acrobatics, visual and theatrical effects. George Martin, the Beatles' original producer, and his son Giles Martin worked with the entire archive of Beatles recordings to create the musical component for Love. The result was an unprecedented approach to the music for a stage production. Love sampled 120 songs to create 27 musical pieces. The songs were mixed so that the lyrics and instrumentation from one song blended into the next.

One musical highlight of the show was a new version of "While My Guitar Gently Weeps", which matched the first studio demo of the song with a string arrangement written for Love by George Martin; it was the only new piece of music in the show. A commercial soundtrack of the show was released in November 2006.

== Filmography ==
A documentary on the making of Love titled All Together Now was released on October 20, 2008.

The following scenes from Love are included in Cirque du Soleil: Worlds Away:

- "Lucy in the Sky with Diamonds"
- "Blackbird"
- "Octopus' Garden"
- "Being for the Benefit of Mr. Kite"
- "While My Guitar Gently Weeps"
- "Get Back/Glass Onion"

== Critical reception ==
The New York Times, "In the end, “Love” is a measure of how the Beatles’ music continues to speak to new listeners, and how the group’s constituency has continued to expand: The show’s audience of eight million is vastly larger than the number of people who saw the Beatles perform live."

Variety, "An ambitious blend of Beatles biography and lyrical interpretation shapes Cirque du Soleil‘s latest Las Vegas extravaganza."
