= Cassiopée =

Canadian singer and entertainer

- Cassiopée in 2019

Background information
- Born: Véronique Lapierre; 16 October 1977 (age 48); Quebec City, Quebec, Canada
- Genres: Rock, pop, metal, opera
- Occupations: Singer, performer
- Instrument: vocals

Cassiopée (born 16 October 1977) is a francophone Canadian singer and entertainer. Since 2011, she has played the lead female character Lia in Cirque du Soleil show, Zarkana. She also plays three of the four other female parts in the production.

== Biography ==
Born in Quebec City, Quebec, Canada, Cassiopée began her artistic training at the age of 4, with dance (jazz, ballet, tap and flamenco). At 14, she began her classical voice and music training and pop-rock singing. She also studied acting and many others relevant skills.

She started her professional career by performing in over 500 shows by the French-traditional cabaret company's Les Folie's de Paris in Quebec City, Quebec, Canada and then in Lille and Cannes, France, as a dancer, magician's assistant, entertainer, and lead singer, before moving to Montreal in 2000 as the star of another cabaret and musical company, La Troupe Paris Paris.

In 2002, she was awarded Best Interpreter and Best On-Stage Presence at Le Festival International de la Chanson de Granby (FIGC) where she also received the "Étoile Galaxie" prize. In 2004, she won the "Félix du Spéctacle" prize for her interpretation of Don Juan, awarded by the Adisq trade association. In 2006, she was a judge at the FICG. That same year she received the Radio-Star Fund.

Following the release of her first album, she was invited to perform during the Canada Day celebrations in Ottawa in 2009.

She is also known as the lead singer for the symphonic metal band Anemonia. Second among over a thousand candidates, she was short-listed to replace Tarja Turunen as singer of Nightwish.

She has performed on stage more than 3,000 times for national and international events. Such presentations include Paris Paris, Don Juan, Si Alys m'était chantée, Du Rock à l'Opéra, Show Harley, Joe Dassin, la Grande Fête Musicale, Dracula, entre l'amour et la mort, Rencontres, Paris/Québec sous les Étoiles for the celebrations of Quebec City's 400th anniversary, Sherazade, and les 1001 Nuits.

Since 2011, she has played the lead female character Lia in the Cirque du Soleil show, Zarkana. She also plays three of the four other female parts in the production and lends her voice to the fourth one.

== Discography ==
- Djinninia the witch and chorister, Sherazade, Les 1001 Nuits, Revel Productions
- Cassiopée, solo album (11 April 2006)
- The song "Coeur de Pierre" and appearances "Seul" and "L'Amour Est Plus Fort" on the Don Juan musical album by Félix Gray (7 March 2005), Mercury
- Guest singer, the Christmas album Le Noël angélique de Sœur Angèle (5 December 2006)
- Theme song for Divers/Cité festival Sweet Dreams
- Singer in metal band Anemonia, Moonlit Numina album (October 2009)
- Promotional song for Cirque Du Soleil's Zarkana (2011)
