= Dracula – Entre l'amour et la mort =

Dracula
- Entre l'amour et la mort
- DVD cover
- Music: Simon Leclerc
- Lyrics: Roger Tabra
- Book: Bruno Pelletier Richard Ouzounian
- Productions: 2006 Quebec

Dracula – Entre l'amour et la mort ('Dracula: Between Love and Death') is a Québécois musical created by Canadian songwriter, actor, and recording artist Bruno Pelletier. Lyrics are written by Roger Tabra; music is by Simon Leclerc; the concept is credited to Bruno Pelletier and Richard Ouzounian, adapted from Bram Stoker's novel of the same name.

The musical ran in Quebec from January 13, 2006, to December 16, 2006.

The album from the musical contains 14 tracks.

Music videos were made for both the track 'Nous sommes ce que nous sommes' and 'Étranges étrangers'.

In January 2008, Dracula's cast performed the musical at the Maison de la danse, in Lyon, France with Cassiopée replacing Rita Tabbakh, Julie Dassylva replacing Elyzabeth Diaga, and Matt Laurent replacing Daniel Boucher.

The DVD of the musical was released on March 4, 2008.

== Cast ==
- Bruno Pelletier Martin Giroux (doublure): Count Dracula
- Sylvain Cossette: Jonathan
- Daniel Boucher, Matt Laurent (2008): Renfield
- Andrée Watters: Mina
- Pierre Flynn: Van Helsing
- Gabrielle Destroismaisons: Lucy
- Rita Tabbakh, Elyzabeth Diaga, Brigitte Marchand, Cassiopée, Julie Dassylva (2008): vampiresses
- Louis Gagné: Grand-Lui
- Claude Pineault, Julie Dassylva, Martin Giroux: singers
