= Martin Giroux =

Canadian pop singer (born 1979)

Martin Giroux (born 23 May 1979) is a Canadian pop singer. Hailing in Gatineau, Giroux sings mostly in French. He first became known as a contestant on the TV series Star Académie in 2004. He later had success with the radio hit "J't'aimerai encore". Plays the role of Phoebus in the French revival of the musical Notre-Dame de Paris (premiered in November 2016).

== Early life ==
Giroux was born in Gatineau, Quebec. He began playing guitar at age 12, and from age 16 performed in venues in the Outaouais region of Quebec.

== Music career ==
In 2001, he participated in a number of contests including Tout nouveau, tout show where he was one of three finalists alongside Pierre Lapointe.

In 2004, his profile increased after being asked to participate in the reality TV contest Star Académie. He toured with previous runner-up Marie-Élaine Thibert.

His debut album, Faut que j'te dise..., was released in 2005, and the single "J't’aimerai encore" stayed at number one for nine weeks on the Top 100 BDS Francophone.

In 2006, he understudied the lead role in the Québécois musical Dracula – Entre l'amour et la mort. He also had roles in other musicals such as Joe Dassin – La grande fête musicale and Party Time.

His subsequent albums were En cavale in 2008, and La vie ça s'mérite in 2010, for which he wrote all the music and lyrics.

From November 2016 Martin Giroux plays the role of Captain Phoebus in the musical Notre-Dame de Paris as a member of its main cast.
