= Totem (Cirque du Soleil) =

Circus show

- Logo for Cirque du Soleil's Totem
- Company: Cirque du Soleil
- Genre: Contemporary circus
- Show type: Touring show
- Date of premiere: April 22, 2010 (Montreal)

Creative team
- Writer and director: Robert Lepage
- Director of creation: Neilson Vignola
- Set and props designer: Carl Fillion
- Composers: Guy Dubuc; Marc Lessard
- Costume designer: Kym Barett
- Lighting designer: Étienne Boucher
- Choreographer: Jeffrey Hall
- Sound designer: Jacques Boucher
- Makeup designer: Nathalie Simard
- Acrobatic performance designer: Florence Pot
- Rigging designer: Pierre Masse
- Projection designer: Pedro Pires

Other information
- Preceded by: Viva Elvis (2010)
- Succeeded by: Zarkana (2011)
- Official website

Totem is a touring show by Cirque du Soleil that premiered in Montréal on April 22, 2010. It was written and directed by previous collaborator Robert Lepage (Kà). Cirque du Soleil describes Totem's theme as the evolution of humanity from its primordial, amphibian state toward the aspiration of flight, taking inspiration from many of humanity's founding myths. The show was awarded the 2013 New York Drama Desk Award for Unique Theatrical Experience.

All of Cirque du Soleil's previous touring productions were originally created to be performed inside large, custom-designed tents (called the grand chapiteau), but many of those shows have since been re-staged in arenas and other venues after the conclusion of their "big top" tour. Totem's creation team faced the challenge of designing a show that could be adapted for arenas and other venues from the outset.

== Set and technical information ==
Cirque du Soleil used interactive projection technologies to enhance and provide variety to the types of scenes created for Totem, including swamps, starry nights, lakes, volcanos, and other natural environments. The kinetic images are created with the help of infrared cameras; the projection system can dynamically create projections, making it seem as if they are reacting to the artists' movements in both real-time and pre-recorded sequences. One of the major elements for the set is the large turtle carapace, which functions as both a decorative piece as well as acrobatic equipment. When not in use, the shell is tilted or raised completely to the top of the tent or arena. It weighs 2,700 pounds (1,200 kg), has two horizontal bars, and is covered in a non-slip finish. Another major component of the set is the "scorpion bridge", which functions as an entrance at times. It is made of 10,000 pounds (4,500 kg) of steel and has eight mineral oil hydraulic motors which allow it to move in three dimensions—extending, retracting, curling, etc. Underneath said bridge is housing for a laser, speakers, lighting equipment, and cameras. Movement of the scorpion bridge is controlled by an operator who uses four infrared cameras. Of final note, the marsh reeds at the back of the stage are actually inflatable, which allows for easier transport between performance locations.

Equipment and props that are not part of the set have been just as carefully planned out and created. The unicycles are 7 feet (2.1 m) tall, but are very light for better maneuverability. Similarly, the perch poles were made of duralumin, the largest of which was 33 feet (10 m) tall. In total summation, Totem utilizes 65 tractor-trailer sized containers to transport its 1,200 tonnes (1,200 long tons; 1,300 short tons) of equipment from site to site.

During the Scientist's juggling act, he uses balls made with 96 red, 96 blue, and 96 green LED lights inside. The colors are changed remotely by show technicians during the performance.

== Cast ==
Fifty-two performing artists from 19 countries make up the cast as of Totem's première.

- The Tracker: Assists and guides the Scientist, and is a friend to the animals.
- The Scientist: Performs experiments and visits the different worlds of Totem. Appearance is based on Charles Darwin.
- The Amerindian dancer: Traces the evolution of species.
- The Crystal man: Opens the show by bringing the carapace to life, and ends the show by diving into the lagoon.
- The Sad Fisherman: This clown performs ping-pong ball tricks and drives the speedboat.
- Valentino: This "Italian Tourist" acts as a foil to the Tracker and water-skis from the speedboat.
- Apes: A troupe of 5–6 characters mark the progress of Human Evolution from Ape to Businessman With Cell Phone.

== Acts ==
Totem's acts feature unique presentations of high-caliber circus skills and other performing arts.

- Carapace: A traditional gymnastics apparatus with use of a trampoline ground for a twist.
- Hoops Dancer Part 1: A fast paced Native American hoop dance featuring one of two solo artist.
- Rings trio: A traditional gymnastics act featuring a high flying trio using sheer strength and flexibility to create multiple poses.
- Unicycles with Bowls: A group of female artists ride seven foot high unicycles while balancing metal bowls on their heads. The performers place a bowl on their foot, and kick it back to the head. The act consisted of kicking two or even five bowls at once, kicking bowls to people in front or behind them and even kicking a teapot onto one performers head.
- Contortion: One contortionist uses balance, strength and flexibility in this jaw dropping feat of contortion on a circular platform.
- Crystal Ladies: Using flat squares made of fabric material, an artists perform an antipodism act while spinning these squares on her hands and legs, throwing the squares from one foot/hand to the other. Due to maternal leave, the act was performed as a solo from 2016 to 2017. It was then temporarily removed to reintegrate the act as a duet. The full act premiered again in April 2019 in Vienna.
- Escalade: A businessman, stripped of his suit is trapped deep in the jungle. Jumping and climbing around a Chinese-pole-like framework, as if swinging through the trees, he finds his inner, primitive, ape.
- Diabolo: The Tracker manipulates diabolos (i.e., Chinese yo-yo), which are two sticks linked by a string on which a wooden spool balances.
- Fixed trapeze Duo: A young couple perform death-defying stunts high up on a trapeze. The act represents both the desire and aggravation couples face.
- Manipulation: The Scientist rolls several LED lit balls in a giant glass cone, creating a whole new take on the average juggling act.
- Hoops Dancer Part 2: Two performers dance with hoops in a pounding, percussion-heavy dance.
- Roller skates: A couple create stunning poses as they skate on a platform at high speed.
- Russian Bars: A nerve-wracking act that involves four-inch thick planks that artists use to jump high in the air while performing flips, only to land perfectly on the bar again. (Tamir, Anatoli Baravikou, Aliaksei Buiniakou, Zhan Iordanov, Alexndere Moiseev, Mikalai Liubezny, Aliaksei Liubezny, Nikita Moiseev )

=== Acts in Rotation ===
- Aerial Straps Solo
- Contortion and Fixed Trapeze rotate unless another act is out of the show.

=== Retired acts ===
- Cyr Wheel: The roue Cyr involves a solo artist spinning, balancing and inversions. Used as a rotation act until December 2018.
- Perches: Several performers climb up high poles that are balanced on an artists shoulder. This act was removed in 2013.
- Devil sticks: The tracker manipulates a long stick with two other sticks that he holds onto, both accuracy and timing are used in this energetic act. This act was performed until 2015 before being replaced by Diabolos.
- Hand-to-Hand: A duo perform a traditional hand to hand act, they keep the act at a heartbeat like rhythm. This act was performed until November 2015 before being replaced by Escalade and Contortion.
- Hand balancing: An artist precariously balances on a high hand balancing platform, using contortion and gymnastic techniques. This act was performed until 2017 before being replaced in 2018 by Cyr Wheel.

== Costumes ==
As Totem's storyline includes the evolution of humanity, inspiration for the 779 costume elements came directly from nature. Costume designer Kym Barrett primarily focused on how to treat various fabrics rather than the materials themselves in order to replicate the elements found in nature. Such treatments included advanced printing techniques, fluorescent pigments, and utilizing mirror fragments and crystals for adornment. Below is more detailed information about specific costume pieces and the wardrobe collection as a whole.

- The Crystal Man's stretch velvet leotard is encrusted with nearly 4,500 reflective components; 4,001 are mirror fragments. This costume is the show's heaviest, weighing eight pounds.
- The foot juggling duo's lycra body stockings are each adorned with 3,500 crystals, and each headpiece has another 1,000.
- The hoop dancer's costume is inspired by not one traditional Native American tribe, but by several. For instance it includes a Hopi cross and headdress.
- The unicyclists each have a very distinct look that suggests autumn and the abundance from harvest. Each costume is printed with earth tones and then embellished with hand-sewn details, including bolts, screws, seedpods, feathers, flowers and insects.

== Music ==
As Totem's storyline is about the evolution of humanity, the musical components selected by composers Guy Dubuc and Marc Lessard aimed to reflect this theme. Their score includes instruments and rhythms from around the world, including elements from Native American music, Spanish flamenco, and Indian music. One unique attribute of the music in Totem is that all the musicians sing at some point, which allows for moments of a cappella.

Below are the track titles as they appear in order on the CD, which was originally released on October 6, 2010. The items in parentheses reflect the act correlated with each song.

1. Omé Kayo: Opening, Caparace, Hoops Dancer Part 1
2. Cum Sancto Spiritu:
  - Hand-balancing (2010 – 2017)
  - Aerial Straps (2019 – 2020)
3. Indie-Hip: Rings trio
4. Koumaya: Unicycles with bowls
5. Crystal Pyramid: Foot juggling (2010 – 2017; 2019 – 2020)
6. Thunder:
  - Perches (2010–2013)
  - Cyr Wheel (2018)
7. Toreador:
  - Devil sticks
  - Diabolo
8. Qué Viyéra: Fixed trapeze duo
9. Mr. Beaker: Manipulation
10. Onta: Hoops dancer part 2, roller skates
11. Kunda Tayé: Hand to Hand
12. Fast Boat: Speedboat clown act
13. Terre-mère: Russian bars
14. Omé Yo Kanoubé: Finale

Unlisted songs:

1. Contortion: Contortion
2. Escalade: Escalade
3. Aerial Straps Solo: Aerial Straps Solo
4. Crystal Ladies: Crystal Ladies
5. Fisherman: Clown act

=== Vocalists ===
==== Female singers ====
Zama Magudulela : December 2019 - March 12, 2020
Esi Kwesiwa Acquaah-Harrison: Apr 2010 - Feb 2011, Jan 2012 - Jun 2013, Nov 2013 - Aug 2016, Jul 2017 - Dec 2019
Coco Mbassi : Mar 2011 - May 2011
Odessa Thornhill : May 2011 - Dec 2011, Jul 2013 - Nov 2013
Betina Quest : Aug 2016 - Jun 2017

==== Male singers ====
Christian Laveau: Apr 2010 - Dec 2018, Feb 2020 - March 12, 2020
Christian Kit Goguen: Dec 2018 - Feb 2020

== Tour ==
The Totem tour plan diverged from the prior pattern of other Grand Chapiteau tours, heading to Europe directly after its North American premiers. It then returned to complete its North American tour before heading to Oceania, Asia and Europe.
