= Deborah Colker =

Brazilian theater director, writer, choreographer, and dancer

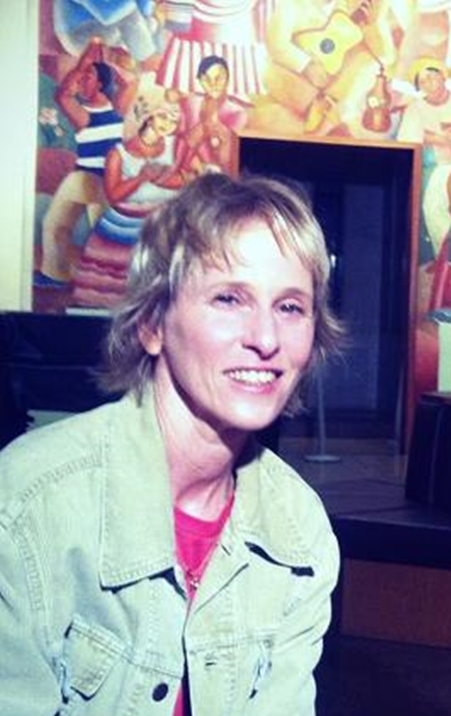
- Deborah Colker in 2013
- Born: December 6, 1960 (age 65); Rio de Janeiro, Brazil
- Occupations: Theater director, writer, choreographer, dancer

she also produced and choreographed the opera El Ultimo Sueno de Frida y Diego at the New York Metropolitan Opera during the 2025-26 season.

May 230, 2026

Deborah Colker (born December 6, 1960, Rio de Janeiro) is a Brazilian writer, theater director, dancer and choreographer. She was an awardee of the Laurence Olivier Award for Outstanding Achievement in Dance. Colker was also the movement director and choreographer of the 2016 Summer Olympics opening ceremony.

== Career ==
Colker began working as a movement director in 1984. She was involved in more than 30 plays, working with Brazil's prominent director and actors. She founded her dance company, the Companhia de Dança Deborah Colker, in 1993. One of her early works was Velox, which explored movement and space and integrated movements from ordinary life. It focused on fusing street, classical, and contemporary dances that do not only include dancers as performers, but also actors and fashion models. One of the notable performances in the company's repertoire was Mix, which featured a collection of movements that investigate the physics of motion on a vertical stage. This choreography won for Colker the Laurence Olivier Award for Outstanding Achievement in Dance in 2001.

In 2009, she wrote, directed and choreographed the Cirque du Soleil production, Ovo. Her works include 4 por 4 ("4 x 4"), which involved a quartet of dances that also featured high-class circus choreography. This performance explored concepts such as containment, delicacy, limitation, daring, and transparency.

Colker was responsible for the more than 6,000 volunteers who danced in the Rio Olympics opening ceremony. She combined Velox and Rota performances, which were part of the repertoire of her dance company.

== Personal life ==
Colker is of Jewish Russian descent, her grandparents on both sides were Jewish Russians who immigrated to Brazil.

== Awards ==
- 2001 : Laurence Olivier
- 2018 : Prix Benois de la Danse
