= Michel Lemieux =

Canadian multimedia artist from Quebec (born 1959)

- Born: February 13, 1959 (age 66); Indianapolis, Indiana, U.S.
- Origin: Montreal, Quebec, Canada
- Genres: rock, experimental
- Occupations: Multimedia artist, singer
- Instrument: Vocals
- Years active: 1970s-present

Michel Lemieux (born February 13, 1959) is a Canadian multimedia artist from Quebec, whose career has incorporated work in theatrical design, installation art, film, video, dance and music. First coming to prominence in the early 1980s as a performance artist whose work explored the integration of new media technologies into experimental pop music in a manner similar to Peter Gabriel and Laurie Anderson, more recently he has concentrated primarily on creating, designing, directing and producing multimedia theatrical presentations for events, theatrical companies and other artists.

== Career ==
A 1979 graduate of the National Theatre School of Canada, Lemieux composed music for dance and theatrical troupes including La La La Human Steps, and did performance art work in Montreal before breaking through to wider success with his 1984 show Solide Salade. The show, a complex performance piece which incorporated film and video projections, music, dance and visual and lighting design, had a successful sold-out run in Montreal before touring venues across North America, Europe and Japan.

In 1986, Lemieux performed the show at Expo 86, and signed to the record label Audiogram, with whom he released a self-titled album of songs from Solide Salade. He won the CASBY Award for Most Promising Male Vocalist, was nominated for the Juno Award for Most Promising Male Vocalist at the Juno Awards of 1986, and garnered two Prix Félix nominations for Best English-Language Pop/Rock Album and Best Video ("Romantic Complications").

In 1988, he premiered his new show Mutations at the arts festival of the 1988 Winter Olympics in Calgary, Alberta, and released the album Taming the Power Inside. He toured Mutations across Canada, and at World Expo 88 in Australia. Taming the Power Inside was again a Félix nominee for Best English Pop/Rock Album.

In 1990, he premiered his first works co-created with Victor Pilon instead of as a solo artist; Pilon has since been Lemieux's creative and business partner in most of his subsequent work. Their first works together were Lemieux's new performance piece Free Fall, and Le Souffle de Pythagore, a holographic video dance work which was Lemieux's first work created for another performer. In 1991, Lemieux and Pilon created In Mid Air, a theatrical piece about the then-imminent transfer of Hong Kong from British to Chinese control which was created for Hong Kong's Festival 2000.

In 1992, Lemieux and Pilon created Têtes Chercheuses, a commissioned performance piece for the 25th anniversary of Montreal's Saidye Bronfman Centre, and created and designed concert performances for UZEB and Michel Rivard, while Lemieux collaborated with Richard Blackburn on the design and staging of the parade to kick off Montreal's 350th anniversary celebrations.

Lemieux and Pilon have since collaborated on works including Grand Hôtel des Étrangers, the stage design and direction of the Prix Félix ceremony in 1995, theatrical adaptations of Jean Cocteau's Orféo, William Shakespeare's The Tempest and Luc Plamondon's Starmania, and Cirque du Soleil's 2006 show Delirium.

Lemieux was named an Officer of the Order of Canada in 2012, and a Chévalier of the National Order of Quebec in 2014.

Lemieux is openly gay. He has stated that while his work addresses universal themes rather than gay-specific ones, he does consider his sexuality to influence his creative perspective.

== Works ==
=== As performer ===
- Le Tympan de la Cantatrice (1982)
- L'Oeil rechargeable/The Rechargeable Eye (1983)
- Solide salade (1984)
- Mutations (1988)
- Free Fall / Voix de passage (1990)

=== As creator or director ===
- Le Souffle de Pythagore (1990)
- In Mid Air (1991)
- Têtes Chercheuses (1992)
- Act of Faith / Feux sacrés (1993)
- Grand Hôtel des Étrangers (1994)
- Territoire Intérieur / À mille lieux (1994)
- Hommage à la musique du Cirque du Soleil (1995)
- Reach for the Stars / La route des étoiles (1995)
- Pôles (1996)
- Time Travel / Voyage dans le temps (1997)
- Orféo (1998)
- Harmony 2000 (1999)
- Ocean of Hope / Océan d’espoir (1999)
- Translucide (2000)
- This is a Sphere (2000)
- Anima (2002)
- The Planets (2003)
- Soleil de minuit (2004)
- La Tempête (2005)
- Delirium (2006)
- NORMAN (2007)
- Starmania Opéra (2008)
- La Belle et la Bête (2011)
- Continuum – Planetarium Rio Tinto and Espace pour la vie (2013)
- Dreamscapes (2014)
- ICARUS (2014)
- Cité Mémoire (2016)

== Discography ==
- Michel Lemieux (1986)
- Taming the Power Inside (1987)
