= Corde lisse =

Aerial circus skill

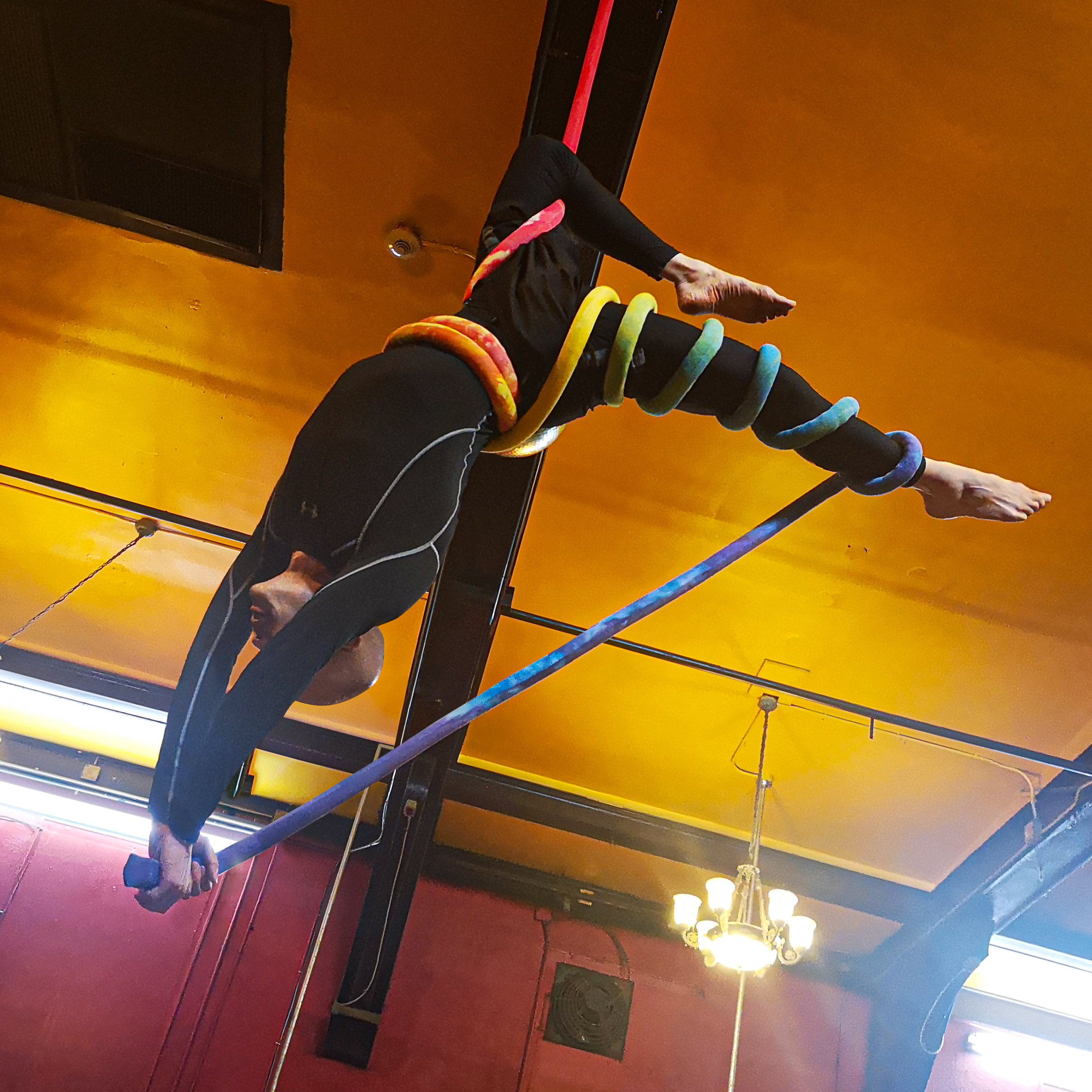
Aerial circus artist on corde lisse

Corde lisse is an aerial circus skill or act that involves acrobatics on a vertically hanging rope. The name is French for "smooth rope". In English-speaking parts of the world, it is also referred to as "aerial rope".

== Description ==
Corde lisse moves are normally a combination of held postures and drops using a rope that hangs from the ceiling. These ropes are normally made from soft cotton about 30-35mm thick. The technique is closely related to both silks, (another aerial circus skill performed on one or two long strips of strong fabric, often in bright colours), and Spanish web. It requires great skill and strength. Performers do not have any kind of safety net or safety line, relying on their own strength and ability to prevent a fall.

It is possible for two (or more) people to perform on the same rope, although more than two is rare. The performers can hang off each other or be at different heights on the rope.

The most famous use of aerial circus skills such as these has been for the BBC's test-card. Cirque du Soleil also uses corde lisse, aerial silks and trapeze in some of their shows. There are many schools and circus centers that teach rope throughout the world.

== Corde lisse skills ==
There is no single naming convention for the skills on a corde lisse. Below is a list of names of moves, some of which are similar to the gymnastic equivalent, or which are a partial description of the move (e.g. double foot tie). This is by no means a complete list, as people are discovering and inventing new moves all the time.

=== Some solo moves ===
- Back Balance
- Front Balance
- Arabesque
- Basic upside-down hang
- Basqules
- Beats
- Big knot
- Crochet
- Crucifixion
- Dive
- Double foot tie
- Fan
- Flag
- Foot hang
- Front flip
- Hang
- Hip key
- Hip wrap knot
- Horizontal flip
- Knee lock
- Knee lock slide
- Lean out
- Leg wraps (same and opposite side, left and right leg)
- Loop
- Miracle split
- One arm hang
- Piston
- Rope climb (up and down)
- Salto
- Skip drop
- Spider
- Tempo swing
- Toe climb
- Windmills
- C-Shape Roll-Ups

=== Some doubles moves ===
- Angel
- Ankle hang
- Double swan
- Flower
- Front balance
- Leg catch

== In popular culture ==
In Christopher Nolan's Batman Begins (2005) there is a scene where Bruce and his parents go to the theatre. On the stage there are a group of performers doing wheel down's on Corde Lisse that remind Bruce of bats, scaring him, and causing the family to leave. After they leave Bruce's parents are killed.
