= Spanish web =

Aerial circus skill

The Spanish web is an aerial circus skill in which a performer climbs and performs various tricks on an apparatus resembling a vertically hanging rope. It is similar in appearance and performance style to the corde lisse, but with the addition of loops on the rope for hands or feet, permitting one to perform a variety of spinning motions. The name refers to both the apparatus and the performance.

== Rope structure ==
The apparatus is akin to a larger kernmantle rope. Unbraided cotton or polyster-blend rope is pulled through a soft, round, cotton sleeve two inches in diameter (a "web"). An eye is made in one end of the web, to which a swivel is attached. That is suspended at one end from the overhead rigging. Towards the top of the web, a hand, foot or neck loop is attached to the main rope through which a performer will secure an ankle, wrist or their neck and be able to hang freely while spinning.

== Performance ==
In a typical Spanish web performance, there is a climber (or flyer) and a web setter. The web setter typically kneels on one knee, and the climber can climb first on the setter's thigh before ascending the web. Once the climber has ascended the web, the web setter can spin the web around the performer, creating enough centrifugal force to push the performer into a near-horizontal position. Web setting is a specialty skill in its own right, with a lot more difficulty than one might expect. While spinning, the climber can hold on to the web in addition to hanging from the loop or can release the rope and spin that way. With the addition of an extra swivel attached between the loop and the web, it is possible for the performer to also spin separately from the rope.

Spanish web skills are often combined with the skills of corde lisse, which does not utilize a loop or a web setter, but is a stationary rope which the performer winds into different knots around the body, performing various drops and locking positions.

One of the rigging challenges with Spanish web is arresting the torquing forces involved. These forces must be arrested within the rigging systems and that usually involves extra guy lines, gusset plates, diagonal bracing and other such techniques.

== Related to ==
- Corde lisse
- Aerial silk
