= Victor Pilon =

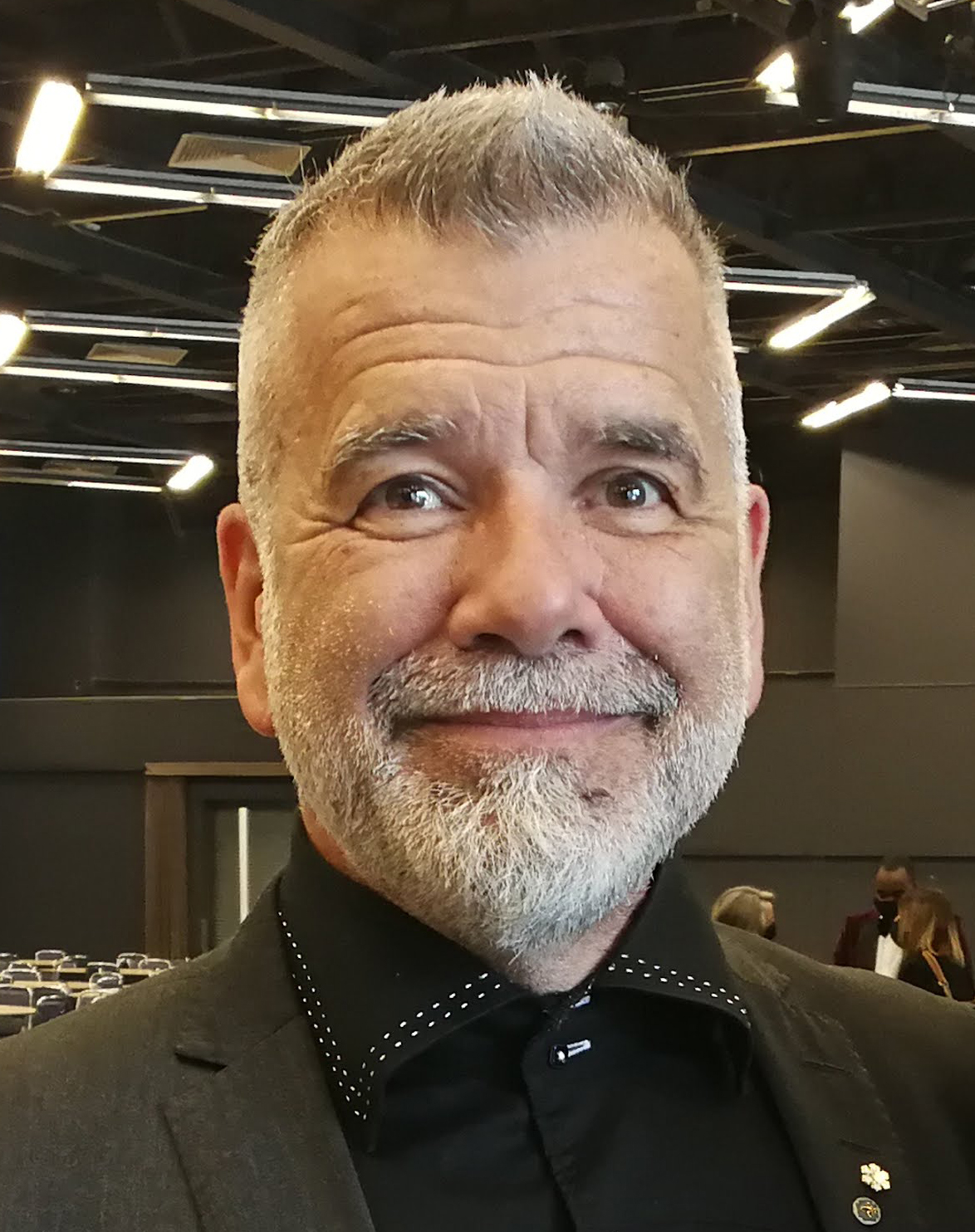
Photo of Canadian artist Victor Pilon

Victor Pilon, OC CQ RVM (born on March 19, 1958) is a director, theatre designer, visual designer and photographer from Quebec, Canada.

== Life and career ==
After a two-year stay in Europe, Pilon enrolled in visual arts at the University of Ottawa. In 1983, after receiving his bachelor's degree with a specialization in photography, he moved to Montreal. He founded the company Lemieux Pilon 4D Art with Michel Lemieux in 1990. Since then, they have worked together to design multimedia productions, including La Belle et la Bête (2011), NORMAN (2007), La Tempête (2005) and Anima (2002), all of which have toured internationally.

In 2003, Pilon and Lemieux did the visual design for the television show The Planets, based on the music of Gustav Holst, presented on the French and English networks of the Canadian Broadcasting Corporation (CBC). They also created many large-scale events such as Harmony 2000, a show created to celebrate the beginning of the new millennium, and Soleil de Minuit, the closing performance of the Montreal International Jazz Festival (MIJF) in 2004, commemorating, respectively, the 20th and 25th anniversaries of Cirque du Soleil and the MIJF. They were also behind Cirque du Soleil's DELIRIUM, a multimedia production revisiting the music of Cirque du Soleil's past productions, with over 50 artists onstage. In 2008, they directed Starmania by Luc Plamondon and Michel Berger, the first time the musical had been produced as an opera.

As official photographer for the British royal family when in Canada, Pilon has covered more than 30 of their visits. Working for the Government of Quebec and Government of Canada, he has also photographed various other heads of state during their official visits.

== Honours, awards and nominations ==
- 2014 – Knight, National Order of Quebec
- 2013 – Officer, Order of Canada
