= Aerial hoop =

Circus apparatus

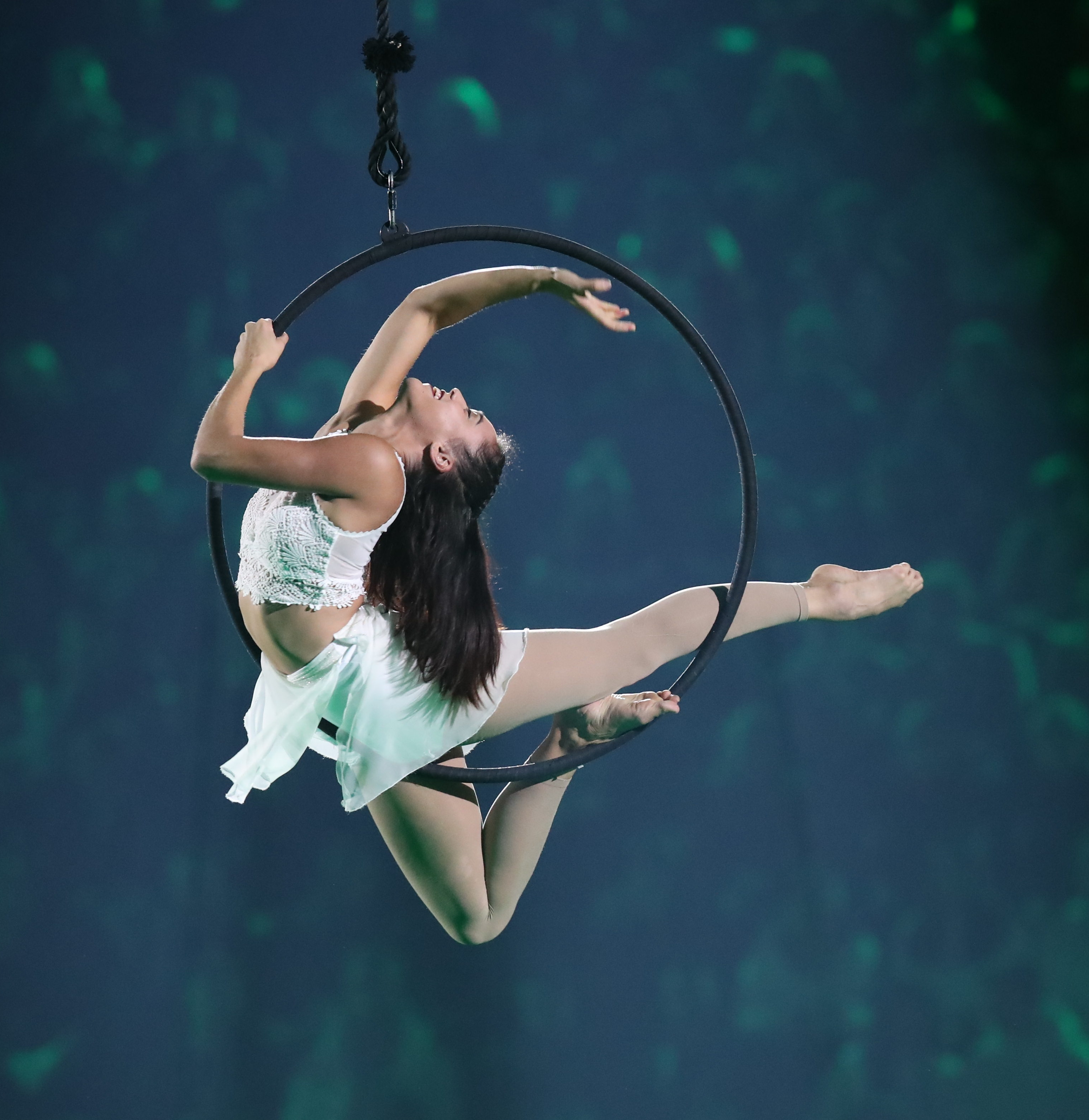
An aerial hoop performance

The aerial hoop (also known as the lyra, aerial ring or cerceau/cerceaux) is a circular steel apparatus (resembling a hula hoop) suspended from the ceiling, on which circus artists may perform aerial acrobatics. It can be used static, spinning, or swinging. It can be single point or double point. Tricks that can be performed include the Candlestick, Bird's Nest and Crescent Moon.

== Mechanism ==
Lyras hang from their rigging via a spanset. Most aerial hoops connect at either one point (single tab configuration) or two points (double tab configuration), with some tabless variations tied directly onto the hoop rather than on a tab. The number of tabs an aerial hoop has will depend on how it will be used, the intended effect, and the performer's comfort level. All rigging hardware that connects to an aerial hoop must be safety tested and certified to ensure the performer is safe.
