= Alegría (Cirque du Soleil) =

Touring live entertainment production

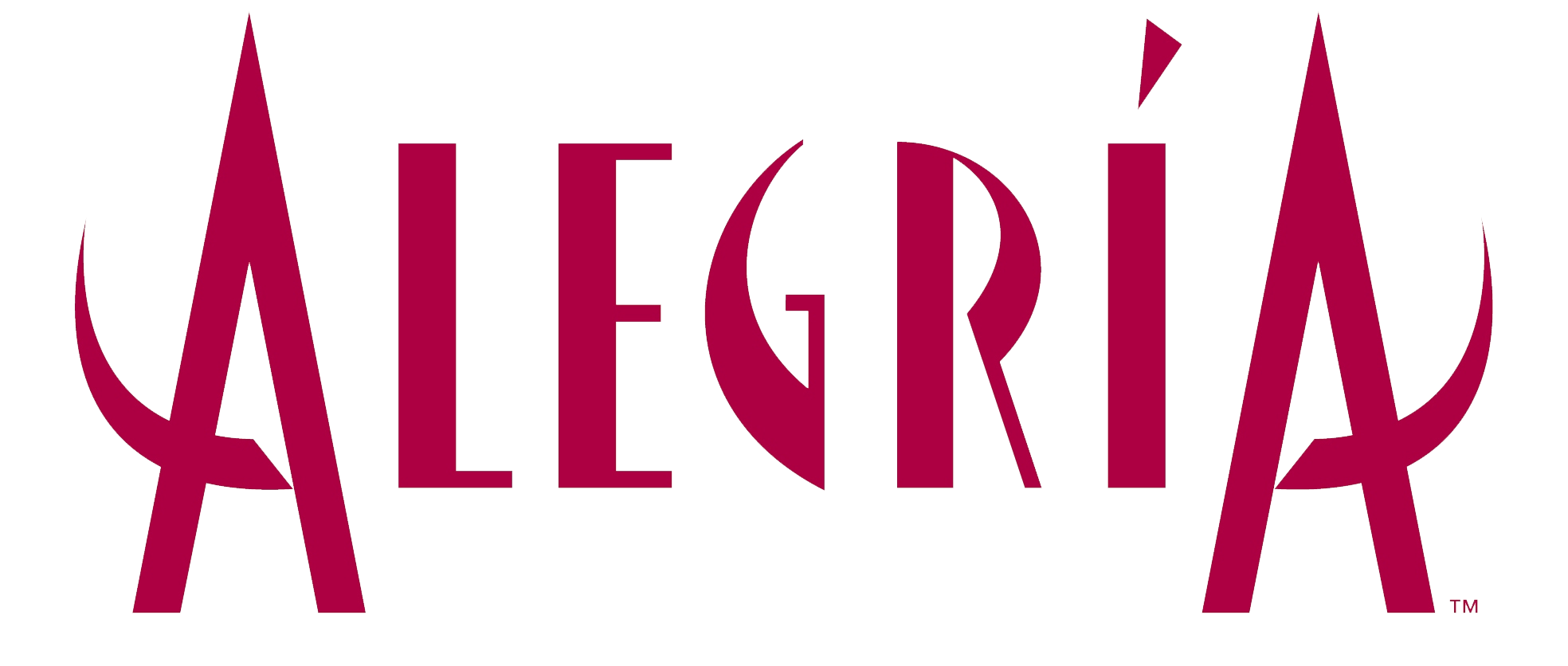
- Logo for Cirque du Soleil's Alegria
- Company: Cirque du Soleil
- Genre: Contemporary circus
- Show type: Touring arena show
- Date of premiere: 21 April 1994 (Montreal)
- Location: Montreal

Creative team
- Director: Franco Dragone
- Director of creation: Gilles Ste-Croix
- Composer: René Dupéré
- Costume designer: Dominique Lemieux
- Set designer: Michel Crête
- Choreographer: Debra Brown
- Lighting designer: Luc Lafortune
- Sound designer: Guy Desrochers
- Company founder and CEO: Guy Laliberté
- Make-up designer: Nathalie Gagné

Other information
- Preceded by: Mystère (1993)
- Succeeded by: Quidam (1996)
- Official website

Alegría is a Cirque du Soleil touring production, created in 1994 by director Franco Dragone and director of creation Gilles Ste-Croix. It takes its name from the Spanish word for "joy".

Since April 1994 the show has been performed over 5000 times, and has been seen by over 14 million spectators in more than 250 cities around the world.

A video version is also available, shot during a live performance in 2001 in Sydney, Australia.

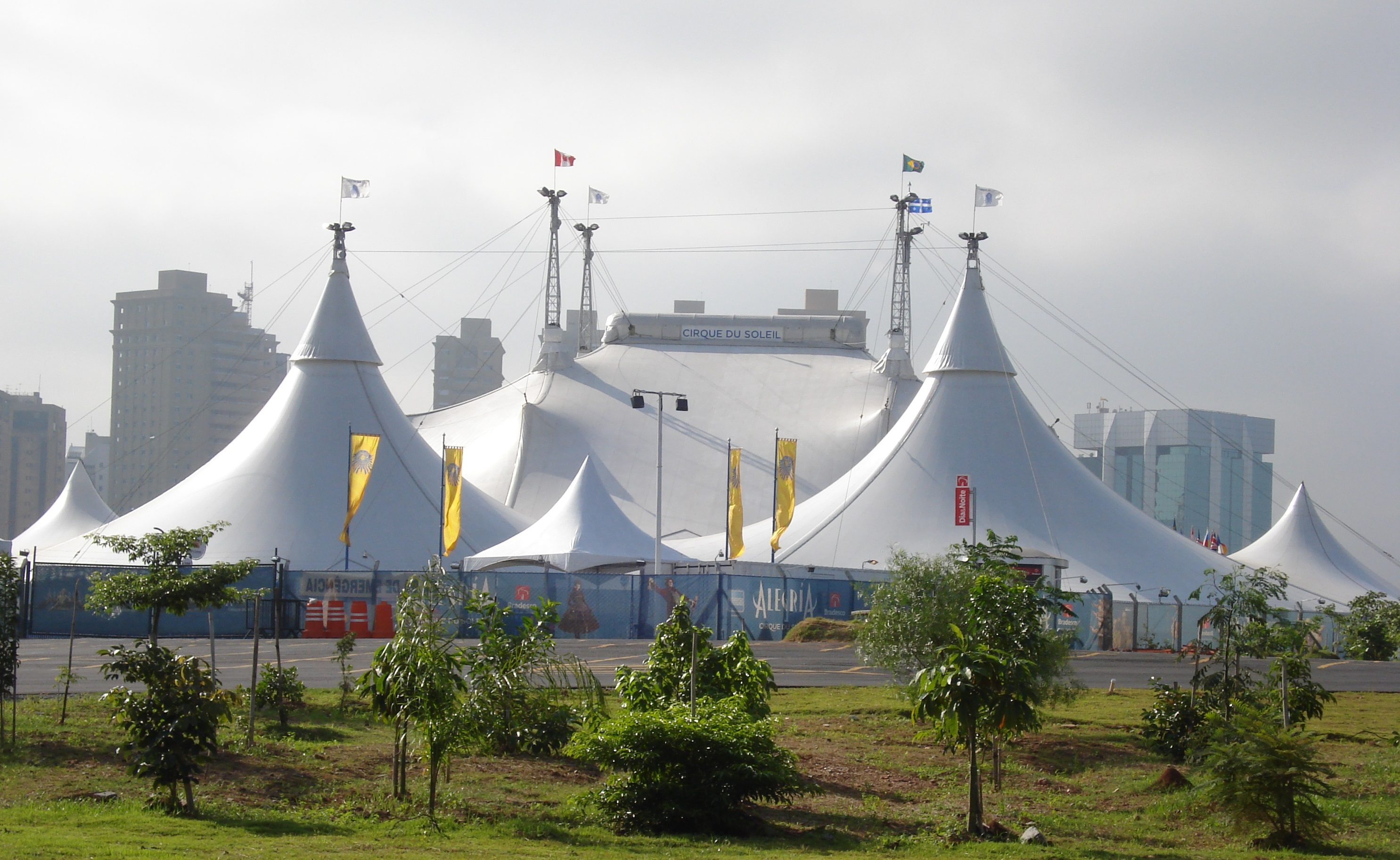
Alegria's Grand Chapiteau in São Paulo, Brazil. March 2008

== Set and technical information ==
The stage of Alegría is topped by a giant dome and is decorated with stylistic columns and balustrades. The dome is similar to how churches and government buildings utilize similar architectural constructs. The stage has spiral ramps on opposing sides which lead down, symbolizing the unknown. The floor of the stage has the head of a salamander, used for the four elements in which it lives. The 17th-century-ballroom unique lighting design reflects a nostalgic atmosphere. An Autumnal color palette creates the luminous obscurity of the show.

== Characters ==
The characters in Alegría comprise people of two separate generations: the New Order and the Old Order.

- Fleur: An unpredictable and dangerous madman who believes he is king. He is the guide to the world of Alegría.
- Nostalgic Old Birds: The Nostalgic Old Birds have lived in the palace for as long as it has existed. They are empty-shelled courtiers who admire their reflections in mirrorless frames. They include Gracieuse, Blanche, Valentin, Wilfrid, Georges-Etienne and more.
- Fire Bird: He appears for a brief dance before fire knife act and is present in the background while the fire knife dancer is performing.
- Tamir and Little Tamir: Appears when needed, only to disappear once he has fulfilled his mission.
- The Musicians: They provide the show's live music, dressed entirely in white. In the first run of the show, they were sometimes referred to as Les Hiboux ("the Owls").
- Nymphs: Exuberant characters who celebrate life.
- Bronx: The young and tough, who are the next generation in Alegría. They perform on the power track and aerial high bar.
- The Angels: The guardians who are the youth of tomorrow. They perform on the Russian bars.
- White Singer: One of the singers. She is the storyteller who sings about everything she sees around her. She is often desired by the male characters of the show.
- Black Singer: One of the singers. She has a wickedness about her and is the White Singer's opposite. She always avoids approaching the front of the stage.
- Clowns: Reflecting the eternal spirit of mankind, the clowns are witnesses to the passing of centuries, the social commentators of the world of Alegría. Grounded in real life, they tell little stories of everyday existence where everyone is a hero, and where anyone can fall in love and suffer a broken heart. The clowns are visionaries - philosophers of absurdity. Endearing, comical and childlike, they turn the world into a circus.
  - Slava Polunin, Vanya Polunin, Ivan Polunin, Dimitri "Dima" Bogatirev, Sergey Chachelev, Yuri Medvedev, Sergiy Marchenko and Iryna Ivanytska. (1994 - 1997)
  - Leonid Leykin, Valery Keft, Yuri Medvedev, Sergiy Marchenko and Michel "Balthazar" Deschamps. (1997 - 2000)
  - Nikolai Terentiev, Vladimir Olshansky, Yuri Medvedev, Bouchon and Anton Valen. (2001 - 2004)
  - Anton Valen, Marcos Casuo, Ben Johnson, Oleg Popkov and Yuri Medvedev. (2004 - 2009)
  - Jesse Buck, Aron de Casmaker, Pablo Gomis Lopez, Pablo Bermejo Medina and Maxim Fomitchev. (2009 - 2013)

== Acts ==
The acts of Alegría have had a bit of turnover, but continue to fit its theme: "A baroque ode to the energy, grace and power of youth."

- Opening: Fleur and the musicians, walk in the audience, while the show is being prepared.
- Prologue (Mirko): The white singer sings a song while the characters and acrobats of Alegría run around the stage to welcome the audience to the world of Alegría.
- Synchronized trapeze: Two acrobats perform tricks on two separate trapezes.
- Horse: A clown and a horse have comical problems. (2004 - 2013)
- Power track: A group of acrobats perform flips and twists on an X-shaped power track.
- Paper planes: The clowns come in, playing with paper airplanes. (2004 - 2013)
- Hand balancing: An artist performs handbalancing on canes. (1996 - 2005, 2006 - 2013)
- Fire-knife dance: Two artists perform a dance using fire-knives.
- Clown candle: A clown comes in, and tries to mimic the fire-knife dancing act by using a candle instead. (1996 - 2013)
- Manipulation: An artist manipulates ribbons, contortion and hula hoops. The original act consisted of only contortion, and hula hoops.
- Snowstorm: A clown performs a symbolic tale of Love and Heartbreak.
- Le Bal: The white singer comes in and sings Danze Vazoule while going in the audience, picking a person out and dancing with the audience member.
- Flying man: An artist bounces and flies high above the stage with bungee cords.
- The Bar: The clowns come in and play with a Russian bar. (2004 - 2013)
- Russian bars: A group of acrobats perform Russian bars.
- Contortion: Two artists create graceful and lithe figures and movements with their extreme flexibility and balance. The original act consisted of one contortionist.
- Interlude to Aerial high bar: Little Tamir comes and flies with a bird structure.
- Aerial high bar: A group of acrobats fly, twist and spin on a structure in the air while a net is below them. Once they fly off the structure, the acrobats will be caught by other acrobats on a swinging trapeze.
- Finale: The white singer sings Alegría while the cast of Alegría comes and says farewell to the audience.

=== Acts in rotation ===
- Cyr wheel: An artist spins and performs tricks in a Cyr wheel. (2009 - 2013)
- Juggling: An artist juggled up to 6 balls. (2003 - 2012)

=== Retired acts ===
- Tightwire: A performer balanced precariously on a wire, the performer would jump and even flip on the wire. (1996)
- Shoulder pole wire: An original Alegría act, it featured a young performer who balanced a long pole on their shoulders with a tight wire platform on top. On this wire, a younger performer flipped, turned and leapt always keeping their balance. (1994 - 1995)
- Strong man: This act was quite literally a very strong man, the performer would warp metal and even lift the weight of multiple performers. The act was originally performed by actor and professional arm-wrestler Rick Zumwalt, and soon afterwards would be performed by Stepan Ivanov, Ginaud Dupuis and Filippe Vorobiev. (1994 - 1999, 2001 - 2004)
- Slackwire: This act used a swinging, loose wire. On this a female artist balanced, rolled and even rode a unicycle on the slack wire. (2004 - 2005)
- Aerial cube: An artist performed with the metal skeleton of a large cube on the ground and in the air. (1994 - 1995, 1997 - 1999, 2004 - 2007)
- Aerial silk: Strong yet sensitive, powerful yet delicate, natural but surreal, the Flying Man emerges from the shadows, showing his force for more subtle art, evoking sensual men's movement, and the live stream on silk. (1996, 2003)
- Solo trapeze: An acrobat performed on a single trapeze. (2007 - 2011)
- Aerial contortion: Intensity, power and grace combine when a young woman becomes one with the column of red fabric which supports and cradles her. (1995)
- Birds on a Wire: Two clowns mime as birds. (1994 - 2004)
- Plane: A clown fiddles around with a toy plane. (1994 - 1997)
- Chairs: A clown tries to organize chairs. (1994 - 1997)
- Martyr: A clown dies comically after being pierced with a myriad of arrows. (1994 - 1996)
- Shadow: Two clowns have a strange encounter with one another. (1994 - 2004)
- Mess: The clowns attempt to clean a piece of trash off the ground, but end up causing complete chaos. (1994 - 1997)
- Balloon: The clowns portray a comic struggle between two individuals. (1997 - 2000, 2004 - 2005)
- Flowers: The clowns pantomime a story about romance and friendship. (1997 - 2000, 2004)
- Rain: A lonely clown makes his way through the rain to find the sun. (1997 - 2000)
- Noose: The clowns find a Noose. (2001 - 2004)

== Costumes ==
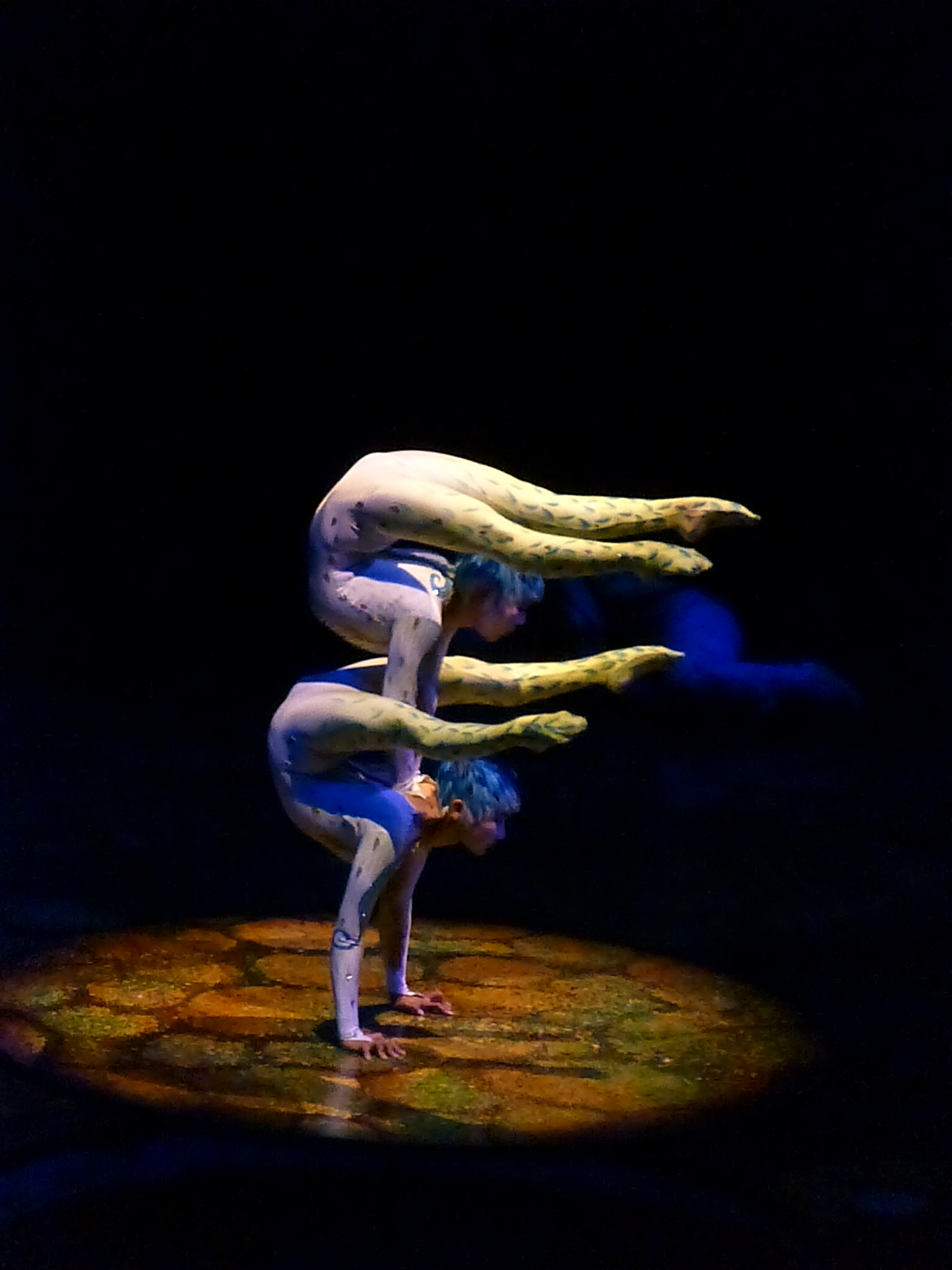
Contortion artists in Alegría

Alegría's costumes have a dichotomy relating to the Old Order and the New Order. The Old Order has costumes which are reminiscent of New York's Gilded Age as they are finely decorated with feathers, lace, and other adornments. The New Order, on the other hand, representing the youth of tomorrow, have the same rich hues as the old order, while the fabrics used are lighter and softer, helping to emphasize the agility of youth.

== Music ==
The original album artwork of Alegría, 1994

The soundtrack was composed by René Dupéré, who had composed for previous productions including Nouvelle Expérience, Saltimbanco and Mystère.

It was released as a studio album on 27 September 1994. Robbi Finkel and René Dupéré were nominated for a Grammy Award as Best Arranger at the 38th Annual Grammy Awards. The album was also nominated for several Félix Awards in 1995, winning two of the latter: 'Producer of the Year' for Robbi Finkel and René Dupéré, and 'Sound Mixer of the Year' for Rob Heaney. Alegría was also ranked on the Billboard World Music Chart for 65 weeks.

In November 1995, a live album was recorded during the Fairfax tour stop (billed as Washington). This release was exclusive to employees, though years later it became a collector's item. The tracks are listed below according to the back cover, as some tracks (e.g., Fast Track has four parts) were divided into parts according to the conductor's cues or have different titles than the 1994 studio release and refer to the act's name. (e.g., Kalandéro is called La perche after Shoulder-Pole Wire act).

The tracks for the original 1994 release, including the two extended tracks from 2002 (recorded in Sydney, 2001) are listed below and alongside are the acts during which they are played.

1994 studio album

1. Alegría (Finale)
2. Vai Vedrai (Synchronized trapeze), (Trapeze Duplex) (2007–2010)
3. Kalandéro (Shoulder-Pole Wire) (1994–1995), (Tightrope) (1996, 2004), (Juggling) (2002–2004, 2006–2013), (Slackwire) (2004–2005)
4. Querer (Little Tamir's bird flight, net setup)
5. Irna (Power track)
6. Taruka (Contortion)
7. Jeux d'enfants (Clown act & power track setup)
8. Mirko (Opening pt. 2)
9. Icare (Aerial high bar)
10. Ibis (Aerial Cube) (1994–1995, 1997–1999, 2004–2008), (Aerial Silks) (1996, 2003–2004)
11. Valsapena (Power track)
12. Nocturne (Snowstorm)
  - 2002 extended edition bonus tracks. Recorded in Sydney.
13. Cerceaux (Manipulation)
14. Malioumba (Flying man) (2001–2013)

1995 live album (Live in Fairfax)

- CD1
1. Milonga (Introduction to musicians)
2. Ouverture (Pre-Opening sequence)
3. Mirko (Opening)
4. Vai Vedrai (trapèze) (Synchronized trapeze), (Trapeze Duplex) (2007–2010)
5. Jeux d'enfants (et les chaises) (Clown chair act & fast-track setup)
6. Fast-track (Irna / Valsapena) (Fast/Power track)
7. Oiseaux sur la corde (clowns) (Clown act) (1994–2004)
8. La perche (Kalandéro) (Shoulder-pole wire) (1994–1995)
9. Homme fort (Strong man) (1994–1999, 2001–2004)
10. Hoola Hoops (Hoops manipulation)
11. La tempête (Nocturne) (Snowstorm)
12. Le feu (Fire-knife dance)
- CD 2
1. Le Bal (Danse Vazoule, also includes The Letter) (Entr'acte ball interlude, The Letter interlude/Foulball)
2. Le Cube (Ibis) (Aerial Cube) (1994–1995, 1997–1999, 2004–2008), (Aerial Silks) (1996, 2003–2004)
3. Barres russes (also known as Force 4/Balafon) (Russian Bars)
4. Bardak (Clown act) (1994–1997), Juggling (2005)
5. Contorsion (Taruka) (Contortion)
6. Montage du filet (Querer) (Little Tamir's bird flight, net setup)
7. Grands Volants (Icare) (Aerial high bar)
8. Alegría (Finale)

Other songs

1. Sisyphe (Handbalancing) (1995–2013)
2. Rinalto Vera (Cyr wheel) (2009–2013)
3. Concierto de Aranjuez (Clown act) (1994–1996)
4. Ombre (Clown act) (1994–2004)
5. Fleurs/Fête des Fleurs (Clown act) (1997–2000, 2004)

== Tour ==
Alegría's tour history is quite extensive as it premiered in 1994. Having toured under the Grand Chapiteau for many years before switching to various arenas. During 1999 and 2000, it briefly played as a resident show at Biloxi's Beau Rivage.

The following colorboxes indicate the region of each performance: EU Europe NA North America SA South and Central America AP Asia/Pacific OC Oceania

=== Arena tour ===
1998-1999, 2009-2013

==== 1998 schedule ====
- EU Royal Albert Hall, London, UK - From 7 Jan 1998 to 8 Feb 1998

==== 1999 schedule ====
- EU Royal Albert Hall, London, UK - From 5 Jan 1999 to 7 Feb 1999
- NA Beau Rivage, Biloxi, MS - From 20 May 1999 to 2 Oct 2000

==== 2009 schedule ====
- NA Halifax, NS - From 27 May 2009 to 7 Jun 2009
- NA St. John, NB - From 10 Jun 2009 to 14 Jun 2009
- NA St. John's, NL - From 19 Jun 2009 to 28 Jun 2009
- NA Providence, RI - From 2 Jul 2009 to 5 Jul 2009
- NA Manchester, NH - From 8 Jul 2009 to 12 Jul 2009
- NA Newark, NJ - From 15 Jul 2009 to 19 Jul 2009
- NA Wilkes-Barre, PA - From 22 Jul 2009 to 26 Jul 2009
- NA Hamilton, ON - From 29 Jul 2009 to 2 Aug 2009
- NA Bridgeport, CT - From 20 Aug 2009 to 23 Aug 2009
- NA Boston, MA - From 26 Aug 2009 to 30 Aug 2009
- NA Albany, NY - From 2 Sep 2009 to 6 Sep 2009
- NA Syracuse, NY - From 9 Sep 2009 to 13 Sep 2009
- NA Amherst, MA - From 16 Sep 2009 to 20 Sep 2009
- NA Rochester, NY - From 23 Sep 2009 to 27 Sep 2009
- NA State College, PA - From 30 Sep 2009 to 4 Oct 2009
- NA Pittsburgh, PA - From 7 Oct 2009 to 11 Oct 2009
- NA Philadelphia, PA - From 14 Oct 2009 to 18 Oct 2009
- NA Reading, PA - From 21 Oct 2009 to 25 Oct 2009
- NA London, ON - From 12 Nov 2009 to 15 Nov 2009
- NA Greenville, SC - From 18 Nov 2009 to 22 Nov 2009
- NA Augusta, GA - From 25 Nov 2009 to 29 Nov 2009
- NA Hampton, VA - From 2 Dec 2009 to 6 Dec 2009
- NA Worcester, MA - From 9 Dec 2009 to 13 Dec 2009
- NA Montréal, QC - From 18 Dec 2009 to 30 Dec 2009

==== 2010 schedule ====
- NA Québec, QC - From 5 Jan 2010 to 10 Jan 2010
- NA Chicoutimi, QC - From 13 Jan 2010 to 17 Jan 2010
- NA Detroit, MI - From 4 Feb 2010 to 7 Feb 2010
- NA Indianapolis, IN - From 11 Feb 2010 to 14 Feb 2010
- NA Austin, TX - From 17 Feb 2010 to 21 Feb 2010
- NA Frisco, TX - From 24 Feb 2010 to 28 Feb 2010
- NA Hoffman Estates, IL - From 3 Mar 2010 to 7 Mar 2010
- NA Cedar Rapids, IA - From 10 Mar 2010 to 14 Mar 2010
- NA Champaign, IL - From 17 Mar 2010 to 21 Mar 2010
- NA Omaha, NE - From 24 Mar 2010 to 28 Mar 2010
- NA East Lansing, MI - From 31 Mar 2010 to 4 Apr 2010
- NA Cleveland, OH - From 7 Apr 2010 to 11 Apr 2010
- NA Highland Heights, KY - From 29 Apr 2010 to 2 May 2010
- NA St Louis, MO - From 5 May 2010 to 9 May 2010
- NA Kansas City, MO - From 12 May 2010 to 16 May 2010
- NA Salt Lake City, UT - From 19 May 2010 to 23 May 2010
- NA Fresno, CA - From 26 May 2010 to 30 May 2010
- NA Sacramento, CA - From 2 Jun 2010 to 6 Jun 2010
- NA Rio Rancho, NM - From 9 Jun 2010 to 13 Jun 2010
- NA Cypress, TX - From 16 Jun 2010 to 20 Jun 2010
- NA Minneapolis, MN - From 23 Jun 2010 to 27 Jun 2010
- NA Toronto, ON - From 30 Jun 2010 to 4 Jul 2010
- NA Winnipeg, MB - From 22 Jul 2010 to 25 Jul 2010
- NA Regina, SK - From 27 Jul 2010 to 1 Aug 2010
- NA Saskatoon, SK - From 4 Aug 2010 to 8 Aug 2010
- NA Edmonton, AB - From 11 Aug 2010 to 22 Aug 2010
- NA Kelowna, BC - From 25 Aug 2010 to 29 Aug 2010
- NA Kamloops, BC - From 1 Sep 2010 to 5 Sep 2010
- NA Victoria, BC - From 8 Sep 2010 to 12 Sep 2010
- NA Tacoma, WA - From 15 Sep 2010 to 19 Sep 2010
- NA Spokane, WA - From 22 Sep 2010 to 26 Sep 2010
- NA Honolulu, HI - From 15 Oct 2010 to 31 Oct 2010
- NA Boise, ID - From 4 Nov 2010 to 7 Nov 2010
- NA Houston, TX - From 10 Nov 2010 to 14 Nov 2010
- NA Phoenix, AZ - From 17 Nov 2010 to 21 Nov 2010
- NA Tucson, AZ - From 24 Nov 2010 to 28 Nov 2010
- NA El Paso, TX - From 1 Dec 2010 to 5 Dec 2010
- NA Oklahoma City, OK - From 22 Dec 2010 to 26 Dec 2010
- NA Wichita, KS - From 29 Dec 2010 to 2 Jan 2011

==== 2011 schedule ====
- NA Baton Rouge, LA - From 5 Jan 2011 to 9 Jan 2011
- NA Colorado Springs, CO - From 12 Jan 2011 to 16 Jan 2011
- NA Broomfield, CO - From 19 Jan 2011 to 23 Jan 2011
- NA Loveland, CO - From 26 Jan 2011 to 30 Jan 2011
- NA Laredo, TX - From 2 Feb 2011 to 6 Feb 2011
- NA Hidalgo, TX - From 9 Feb 2011 to 13 Feb 2011
- NA Corpus Christi, TX - From 16 Feb 2011 to 20 Feb 2011
- NA Tulsa, OK - From 23 Feb 2011 to 27 Feb 2011
- NA North Charleston, SC - From 17 Mar 2011 to 20 Mar 2011
- NA Knoxville, TN - From 23 Mar 2011 to 27 Mar 2011
- NA Charlottesville, VA - From 30 Mar 2011 to 3 Apr 949494
- NA Atlantic City, NJ - From 7 Apr 2011 to 10 Apr 2011
- NA Greensboro, NC - From 13 Apr 2011 to 17 Apr 2011
- NA Biloxi, MS - From 20 Apr 2011 to 24 Apr 2011
- NA Southaven, MS - From 27 Apr 2011 to 1 May 2011
- NA Roanoke, VA - From 4 May 2011 to 8 May 2011
- NA Columbia, SC - From 11 May 2011 to 15 May 2011
- NA Toledo, OH - From 18 May 2011 to 22 May 2011
- NA Louisville, KY - From 9 Jun 2011 to 12 Jun 2011
- NA Nashville, TN - From 15 Jun 2011 to 19 Jun 2011
- NA Tampa, FL - From 22 Jun 2011 to 26 Jun 2011
- NA Jacksonville, FL - From 29 Jun 2011 to 3 Jul 2011
- NA Raleigh, NC - From 6 Jul 2011 to 10 Jul 2011
- NA Florence, SC - From 13 Jul 2011 to 17 Jul 2011
- NA Sunrise, FL - From 20 Jul 2011 to 31 Jul 2011
- NA Charlotte, NC - From 3 Aug 2011 to 7 Aug 2011
- NA Estero, FL - From 10 Aug 2011 to 14 Aug 2011
- EU Oberhausen, DE - From 7 Sep 2011 to 11 Sep 2011
- EU Leipzig, DE - From 14 Sep 2011 to 18 Sep 2011
- EU Stuttgart, DE - From 21 Sep 2011 to 25 Sep 2011
- EU Munich, DE - From 28 Sep 2011 to 2 Oct 2011
- EU Salzburg, AT - From 5 Oct 2011 to 9 Oct 2011
- EU Berlin, DE - From 12 Oct 2011 to 16 Oct 2011
- EU Bremen, DE - From 19 Oct 2011 to 23 Oct 2011
- EU Cologne, DE - From 26 Oct 2011 to 30 Oct 2011
- EU Frankfurt, DE - From 2 Nov 2011 to 6 Nov 2011
- EU Mannheim, DE - From 9 Nov 2011 to 13 Nov 2011
- EU Málaga, ES - From 1 Dec 2011 to 4 Dec 2011
- EU Santiago, ES - From 7 Dec 2011 to 11 Dec 2011
- EU Zaragoza, ES - From 14 Dec 2011 to 18 Dec 2011
- EU Lisbon, PT - From 21 Dec 2011 to 8 Jan 2012

==== 2012 schedule ====
- EU Granada, ES - From 11 Jan 2012 to 15 Jan 2012
- EU Bilbao, ES - From 18 Jan 2012 to 22 Jan 2012
- EU Toulouse, FR - From 25 Jan 2012 to 29 Jan 2012
- EU Nantes, FR - From 1 Feb 2012 to 5 Feb 2012
- EU Lyon, FR - From 23 Feb 2012 to 26 Feb 2012
- EU Toulon, FR - From 29 Feb 2012 to 4 Mar 2012
- EU Nice, FR - From 7 Mar 2012 to 11 Mar 2012
- EU Montpellier, FR - From 14 Mar 2012 to 18 Mar 2012
- EU Strasbourg, FR - From 21 Mar 2012 to 25 Mar 2012
- EU Brussels, BE - From 28 Mar 2012 to 1 Apr 2012
- EU Manchester, UK - From 4 Apr 2012 to 7 Apr 2012
- EU Glasgow, UK - From 11 Apr 2012 to 15 Apr 2012
- EU Birmingham, UK - From 18 Apr 2012 to 22 Apr 2012
- EU Dublin, IE - From 25 Apr 2012 to 29 Apr 2012
- EU Budapest, HU - From 17 May 2012 to 20 May 2012
- EU Prague, CZ - From 23 May 2012 to 27 May 2012
- EU Hamburg, DE - From 30 May 2012 3 Jun 2012
- EU Hanover, DE - From 6 Jun 2012 to 10 Jun 2012
- EU Nuremberg, DE - From 13 Jun 2012 to 17 Jun 2012
- EU Vienna, AT - From 20 Jun 2012 to 24 Jun 2012
- EU Belgrade, SB - From 29 Jun 2012 to 1 Jul 2012
- EU Nice, FR - From 18 Jul 2012 to 27 Jul 2012
- AP Tel Aviv, IL - From 8 Aug 2012 to 25 Aug 2012
- EU Athens, GR - From 3 Sep 2012 to 16 Sep 2012
- AP Istanbul, TR - From 22 Sep 2012 to 30 Sep 2012
- EU Istanbul, TR - From 3 Oct 2012 to 14 Oct 2012
- EU Pesaro, IT - From 1 Nov 2012 to 4 Nov 2012
- EU Bologna, IT - From 7 Nov 2012 to 11 Nov 2012
- EU Milan, IT - From 14 Nov 2012 to 18 Nov 2012
- EU Lille, FR - From 21 Nov 2012 to 25 Nov 2012
- EU Paris, FR - From 28 Nov 2012 to 2 Dec 2012
- EU Rotterdam, NL - From 07 Dec 2012 to 9 Dec 2012
- EU Turin, IT - From 13 Dec 2012 16 Dec 2012
- EU Geneva, CH - From 19 Dec 2012 to 23 Dec 2012
- EU Barcelona, ES - From 26 Dec 2012 to 6 Jan 2013

==== 2013 schedule ====
- EU Santa Cruz de Tenerife, ES - From 13 Jan 2013 to 20 Jan 2013
- EU Herning, DK - From 7 Feb 2013 to 10 Feb 2013
- EU Copenhagen, DK - From 13 Feb 2013 to 24 Feb 2013
- EU Oslo, NO - From 28 Feb 2013 to 2 Mar 2013
- EU Stockholm, SE - From 6 Mar 2013 to 10 Mar 2013
- EU Helsinki, FI - From 13 Mar 2013 to 17 Mar 2013
- EU Turku, FI - From 22 Mar 2013 to 24 Mar 2013
- EU Tallinn, EE - From 3 Apr 2013 to 6 Apr 2013
- EU Riga, LV - From 11 Apr 2013 to 14 Apr 2013
- EU Vilnius, LT - From 18 Apr 2013 to 20 Apr 2013
- EU St. Petersburg, RU - From 9 May 2013 18 May 2013
- EU Chelyabinsk, RU - From 23 May 2013 to 26 May 2013
- EU Kazan, RU - From 29 May 2013 to 2 Jun 2013
- EU Moscow, RU - From 5 Jun 2013 to 16 Jun 2013
- EU Kyiv, UA - From 20 Jun 2013 to 30 June 2013
- EU London, UK - From 18 Jul 2013 to 28 Jul 2013
- EU Gdansk, PL - From 31 Jul 2013 to 4 Aug 2013
- EU Palma de Mallorca, ES - From 22 Aug 2013 to 30 Aug 2013
- EU Bucharest, RO - From 5 Sep 2013 to 8 Sep 2013
- EU Bratislava, SK - From 11 Sep 2013 to 15 Sep 2013
- EU Sofia, BG - From 20 Sep 2013 to 22 Sep 2013
- EU Minsk, BY - From 26 Sep 2013 to 28 Sep 2013
- EU Newcastle, UK - From 17 Oct 2013 to 20 Oct 2013
- EU Leeds, UK - From 23 Oct 2013 to 27 Oct 2013
- EU Liverpool, UK - From 30 Oct 2013 to 3 Nov 2013
- EU Nottingham, UK - From 6 Nov 2013 to 10 Nov 2013
- EU Lille, FR - From 13 Nov 2013 to 17 Nov 2013
- EU Bordeaux, FR - From 20 Nov 2013 to 24 Nov 2013
- EU Valencia, ES - From 27 Nov 2013 to 1 Dec 2013
- EU Gijon, ES - From 4 Dec 2013 to 8 Dec 2013
- EU Santander, ES - From 11 Dec 2013 to 15 Dec 2013
- EU Madrid, ES - From 18 Dec 2013 to 22 Dec 2013
- EU Antwerp, BE - From 26 Dec 2013 to 29 Dec 2013 (Final performance)

=== Grand Chapiteau tour ===
1994-2009

==== 1994 schedule ====
- NA Montréal, QC - From 21 Apr 1994 to 29 May 1994 (show première)
- NA Québec, QC - From 9 Jun 1994 to 26 Jun 1994
- NA San Francisco, CA - From 12 Jul 1994 to 14 Aug 1994
- NA San Jose, CA - From 25 Aug 1994 to 25 Sep 1994
- NA Santa Monica, CA - From 6 Oct 1994 to 18 Dec 1994

==== 1995 schedule ====
- NA Costa Mesa, CA - From 24 Jan 1995 to 12 Mar 1995
- NA New York, NY - From 28 Mar 1995 to 4 Jun 1995
- NA Toronto, ON - From 16 Jun 1995 to 9 Jul 1995
- NA Chicago, IL - From 26 Jul 1995 to 27 Aug 1995
- NA Boston, MA - From 8 Sep 1995 to 1 Oct 1995
- NA Washington, DC - From 12 Oct 1995 to 5 Nov 1995
- NA Atlanta, GA - From 17 Nov 1995 to 30 Dec 1995

==== 1996 schedule ====
- AP Tokyo, JP - From 22 Mar 1996 to 15 Sep 1996
- AP Fukuoka, JP - From 30 Sep 1996 to 20 Oct 1996
- AP Hong Kong, HK - From 1 Nov 1996 to 25 Dec 1996

==== 1997 schedule ====
- EU Amsterdam, NL - From 6 Mar 1997 to 3 May 1997
- EU Munich, DE - From 15 May 1997 to 29 Jun 1997
- EU Berlin, DE - From 11 Jul 1997 to 31 Aug 1997
- EU Vienna, AT - From 12 Sep 1997 to 27 Oct 1997
- EU Düsseldorf, DE - From 14 Nov 1997 to 21 Dec 1997

==== 1998 schedule ====
(Alegría played in the Royal Albert Hall in London, UK during this time)

- EU Madrid, ES - From 19 Feb 1998 to 22 Mar 1998
- EU Barcelona, ES - From 2 Apr 1998 to 10 May 1998
- EU Hamburg, DE - From 27 May 1998 to 12 Jul 1998
- EU Antwerp, BE - From 23 Jul 1998 to 6 Sep 1998
- EU Zurich, CH - From 17 Sep 1998 to 1 Nov 1998
- EU Frankfurt, DE - From 12 Nov 1998 to 20 Dec 1998

==== 1999 schedule ====
(Alegría played in the Royal Albert Hall in London, UK during this time)
(Alegría played as a resident show at the Beau Rivage during this time)

==== 2000 schedule ====
(Alegría played as a resident show at the Beau Rivage during this time)

==== 2001 schedule ====
- OC Auckland, NZ - From 10 Jan 2001 to 18 Feb 2001
- OC Melbourne, AU - From 6 Mar 2001 to 13 May 2001
- OC Sydney, AU - From 29 May 2001 to 5 Aug 2001
- OC Brisbane, AU - From 24 Aug 2001 to 23 Sep 2001
- OC Adelaide, AU - From 10 Oct 2001 to 18 Nov 2001
- OC Perth, AU - From 5 Dec 2001 to 27 Jan 2002

==== 2002 schedule ====
- AP Singapore, SG - From 28 Feb 2002 to 7 Apr 2002
- NA Denver, CO - From 12 Jun 2002 to 4 Aug 2002
- NA Minneapolis, MN - From 21 Aug 2002 to 22 Sep 2002
- NA Mexico City, MX - From 10 Oct 2002 to 29 Dec 2002

==== 2003 schedule ====
- NA Dallas, TX - From 23 Jan 2003 to 23 Feb 2003
- NA Houston, TX - From 6 Mar 2003 to 13 Apr 2003
- NA Austin, TX - From 24 Apr 2003 to 18 May 2003
- NA Calgary, AB - From 4 Jun 2003 to 29 Jun 2003
- NA Vancouver, BC - From 10 Jul 2003 to 10 Aug 2003
- NA Seattle, WA - From 21 Aug 2003 to 21 Sep 2003
- NA Portland, OR - From 2 Oct 2003 to 26 Oct 2003
- NA San Francisco, CA - From 6 Nov 2003 to 21 Dec 2003

==== 2004 schedule ====
- NA Miami, FL - From 9 Jan 2004 to 8 Feb 2004
- NA St. Petersburg, FL - From 19 Feb 2004 to 14 Mar 2004
- NA Atlanta, GA - From 25 Mar 2004 to 25 Apr 2004
- NA New York, NY - From 6 May 2004 to 27 Jun 2004
- NA Philadelphia, PA - From 8 Jul 2004 to 8 Aug 2004
- NA Toronto, ON - From 19 Aug 2004 to 26 Sep 2004
- AP Tokyo, JP - From 29 Oct 2004 to 23 Jan 2005

==== 2005 schedule ====
- AP Fukuoka, JP - From 9 Feb 2005 to 3 Apr 2005
- AP Nagoya, JP - From 20 Apr 2005 to 12 Jun 2005
- AP Osaka, JP - From 25 Jun 2005 to 25 Sep 2005
- AP Tokyo, JP - From 13 Oct 2005 to 27 Nov 2005

==== 2006 schedule ====
- EU Royal Albert Hall, London, UK - From 5 Jan 2006 to 12 Feb 2006
- EU Milan, IT - From 23 Feb 2006 to 16 Apr 2006
- EU Rome, IT - From 27 Apr 2006 to 25 Jun 2006
- EU Amsterdam, NL - From 14 Jul 2006 to 20 Aug 2006
- EU Brussels, BE - From 31 Aug 2006 to 15 Oct 2006
- EU Madrid, ES - From 27 Oct 2006 to 17 Dec 2006

==== 2007 schedule ====
- EU Royal Albert Hall, London, UK - From 5 Jan 2007 to 11 Feb 2007
- EU Barcelona, ES - From 22 Feb 2007 to 29 Apr 2007
- EU Paris, FR - From 10 May 2007 to 15 Jul 2007
- EU Gijon, ES - From 26 Jul 2007 to 28 Aug 2007
- SA Curitiba, BR - From 14 Sep 2007 to 7 Oct 2007
- SA Brasília, BR - From 19 Oct 2007 to 11 Nov 2007
- SA Belo Horizonte, BR - From 22 Nov 2007 to 16 Dec 2007
- SA Rio de Janeiro, BR - From 27 Dec 2007 to 27 Jan 2008

==== 2008 schedule ====
- SA São Paulo, BR - From 7 Feb 2008 to 4 May 2008
- SA Porto Alegre, BR - From 15 May 2008 to 8 Jun 2008
- SA Buenos Aires, AR - From 20 Jun 2008 to 27 Jul 2008
- SA Santiago, CL - From 14 Aug 2008 to 21 Sep 2008
- AP Seoul, KR - From 14 Oct 2008 to 28 Dec 2008

==== 2009 schedule ====
- AP Taipei, TW - From 14 Jan 2009 to 22 Feb 2009
- AP Dubai, AE - From 5 Mar 2009 to 5 Apr 2009 (Final show under the Big Top)

== Remount ==
In commemoration of the show's 25th anniversary, a new show called Alegría: In a New Light was created, in its original Big Top format to pay tribute to the original show. The tour began on 18 April 2019 in Montreal. It features revamped numbers, characters, costumes, music and makeup.
