= Cirque du Soleil discography =

Catalogue of albums and singles released by Cirque du Soleil

Cirque du Soleil
- Website: www.cirquedusoleil.com

The following discography is a catalogue of the albums and singles released by the Canadian entertainment company Cirque du Soleil.

The majority of these musical works are studio recordings of compositions from the original scores of Cirque du Soleil's nouveau cirque shows. Since the company's founding in 1984, various composers have been commissioned to write the music for Cirque du Soleil's many productions.

René Dupéré was Cirque du Soleil's first composer. Benoît Jutras, who had worked for many years as an arranger and musical director for the company, began filling the role of composer with the show Quidam (1996 World Premiere in Montreal). In 1998, Violaine Corradi was also selected by Guy Laliberté and Gilles Ste-Croix to become the third main composer for Cirque du Soleil.

Dupéré, Jutras and Corradi would eventually be followed by composers Simon Carpentier, Philippe Leduc, Danny Elfman, Maria Bonzanigo, Jean-François Coté, Berna Ceppas, Guy Dubuc and Marc Lessard, among others. The Cirque du Soleil shows Love, Viva Elvis, and Michael Jackson: The Immortal World Tour do not have original scores; instead, their soundtracks consist of new arrangements of songs by The Beatles, Elvis Presley, and Michael Jackson, respectively.

== Albums ==
=== Cirque du Soleil ===
The 1987 and the subsequent 1990 Cirque du Soleil album contain music from the company's earliest touring productions: Le Grand Tour, La Magie Continue and Le Cirque Réinventé (We Reinvent the Circus).

==== Cirque du Soleil (1987) ====
Cirque du Soleil (1987)

Soundtrack album by René Dupéré
- Released: November 1, 1987
- Label: Naga Productions

1. Ouverture
2. Personages
3. Chaise Musicale / Musical Chair
4. Bicycles
5. Masha
6. Les Pingouins / The Penguin Step
7. Tango
8. Trapeze
9. Charivari

==== Cirque du Soleil (1990) ====
Cirque du Soleil (1990)

Soundtrack album by René Dupéré
- Released: July 1990; November 8, 1994
- Label: RCA Victor

1. Ouverture
2. Bulgares
3. Boule 4
4. Tango
5. Trapeze
6. Cadres
7. Fil De Fer
8. Bicyclettes
9. Boules 1 à 3
10. Les Chaises
11. Entracte
12. Pingouins

=== Nouvelle Expérience ===
Nouvelle Expérience

Soundtrack album by René Dupéré
- Released: 1990; March 23, 1993
- Label: RCA Victor

1. Fanfare
2. Méandres
3. Boléro
4. Bascule
5. Fixe
6. Ballant
7. Baleines
8. Havi Vahlia
9. Suite Chinoise
10. Éclipse
11. L'Oiseau
12. Azimut
13. Sanza
14. Grosse Femme

=== Saltimbanco ===
Saltimbanco

Soundtrack album by René Dupéré
- Released: October 9, 1992
- Label: RCA Victor

Saltimbanco (extended)

Soundtrack album by René Dupéré
- Released: March 19, 2002
- Recorded: 17-19 May, 1996 (live tracks)
- Venues: Beatrixpark, Amsterdam (live tracks)
- Label: BMG/Cirque du Soleil Musique

1. Kumbalawé
2. Barock
3. Kazé
4. Amazonia
5. Norweg
6. Urgence
7. Pokinoï
8. Saltimbanco
9. Il Sogno Di Volare
10. Horéré Ukundé
11. Rideau

==== Extended album ====
Two additional tracks appeared on an "extended" edition of the CD, released March 19, 2002. The tracks were recorded under the big top in Amsterdam, 1996.

12. Adagio (Adagio)
13. Arlequin (Juggling)

==== Saltimbanco (2005 re-release) ====
Saltimbanco (2005 re-release)

Soundtrack album by René Dupéré
- Released: May 17, 2005
- Label: Cirque du Soleil Musique

1. Kumbalawé
2. Saltimbanco
3. Cantus-Mélopée
4. Norweg
5. Kazé
6. Barock
7. Adagio
8. Amazonia
9. Pokinoï
10. Il Sogno Di Volare
11. Horéré Ukundé
12. Rideau

==== Saltimbanco: Live in Amsterdam ====
Saltimbanco: Live in Amsterdam

Live album by René Dupéré
- Released: December 1997
- Recorded: 17-19 May, 1996; June 1996
- Venues: Museumplein, Amsterdam; Marc Sohier's mobile studio
- Studio: Studio M.S.
- Genre: Soundtrack
- Length: 44:17 (CD 1); 49:12 (CD 2)
- Label: Distributed only to employees
- Producers: Marc Sohier & Cirque du Soleil
- 2-disc limited edition

This limited edition of the Saltimbanco soundtrack was distributed exclusively to staff members. It is a live recording of the show and is considered a collector's item.

- CD1
1. Cloche et Présentation
2. Rideau
3. Kumbalawé
4. Adagio
5. Saltimbanco
6. Clown
7. Kazé / Norweg
8. Rêve
9. Arlequin
10. Rave Out
- CD 2
1. Tap Dance
2. Barock
3. Cantus-Mélopée
4. Amazonia
5. Démontage Trapèze
6. La Mort
7. Urgence
8. Il Sogno di Volare
9. Transfert
10. Horéré Ukundé

=== Alegría ===
Alegría

Soundtrack album by René Dupéré
- Released: September 27, 1994; June 2009 (25th Anniversary Edition)
- Labels: RCA Victor (1994); Cirque du Soleil Musique (2009)

Alegría (extended)

Soundtrack album by René Dupéré
- Released: June 11, 2002
- Recorded: June 2001 (Live tracks)
- Venue: The Entertainment Quarter (live tracks)
- Label: BMG/Cirque du Soleil Musique

1. Alegría
2. Vai Vedrai
3. Kalandéro
4. Querer
5. Irna
6. Taruka
7. Jeux d'Enfants
8. Mirko
9. Icare
10. Ibis
11. Valsapena
12. Nocturne

==== Extended album ====
A special "extended" edition of Alegría, released on June 11, 2002, additionally contains the following bonus tracks:

13. Cerceaux (Manipulation)
14. Malioumba (Flying Man)

==== Alegría: Live at Fairfax ====
Alegría: Live at Fairfax

Live album by René Dupéré
- Released: December 1998
- Recorded: November 1995
- Venues: Tysons Galleria, Fairfax County, VA
- Genre: Soundtrack
- Length: 57:34 (CD 1), 43:53 (CD 2)
- Label: Distributed only to employees
- 2-disc limited edition

This limited edition of the Alegría soundtrack was distributed exclusively to staff members. It is a live recording of the show and is considered a collector's item.

- CD 1
1. Milonga
2. Ouverture
3. Mirko
4. Vai Vedrai (trapèze)
5. Jeux d'enfants (et les chaises)
6. Fast-track
7. Oiseaux sur la Corde (clowns)
8. La Perche
9. Homme Fort
10. Hoola Hoops
11. La Tempête
12. Le Feu
- CD 2
1. Le Bal
2. Le Cube
3. Barres Russes
4. Bardak
5. Contorsion
6. Montage du Filet
7. Grands Volants
8. Alegría

=== Mystère ===
The first Mystère disc was launched as a studio album in 1994, but it only lasted two years until 1996, when composers René Dupéré and Benoit Jutras composed a new live version of the show, eliminating the studio album that is now considered a collector's item.

==== Mystère ====
Mystère

Soundtrack album by René Dupéré
- Released: November 8, 1994; September 6, 2005
- Label: Cirque du Soleil

1. Égypte
2. Rumeurs
3. Birimbau
4. Kunya Sobé
5. En Ville
6. Ulysse
7. Rondo
8. Caravena
9. Kalimando

==== Mystère: Live in Las Vegas ====
Mystère: Live in Las Vegas

Live album by René Dupéré & Benoît Jutras
- Released: November 12, 1996; August 16, 2005
- Recorded: 9 and 10 May, 1996
- Venue: Mystère theater at Treasure Island
- Genre: soundtrack
- Length: 54:36
- Labels: RCA Victor (1996); Cirque du Soleil Musique (2005)
- Producers: Daniel Aumais, Carol Ryan & Cirque du Soleil

1. Ouverture/Ramsani
2. Misha
3. Égypte
4. Rondo/Double Face
5. Ulysse
6. Dôme
7. Kalimando
8. Kunya Sobé
9. En Ville/Frisco
10. Gambade
11. High Bar
12. Taïko
13. Finale

==== Mystère twenty-five LIVE ====
Mystère twenty-five LIVE

Live album by René Dupéré & Benoît Jutras
- Released: December 2018
- Recorded: July 7, 2018
- Venue: Mystère theater at Treasure Island
- Genre: Soundtrack
- Length: 56:50
- Label: Distributed only to employees
- Producer: Jeff Lentz
- Double vinyl limited edition manufactured in Czech Republic; Digital download

This limited edition of the Mystère soundtrack was distributed exclusively to staff members for the commemoration of 25 years in 2018.

1. Ouverture/Ramsani
2. Misha
3. Égypte
4. Rondo/Double Face
5. Ulysse
6. Dôme
7. Kalimando
8. Kunya Sobé
9. Convergence
10. Rogue
11. Fiesta
12. Strike of the Net
13. Finale (Jutras - tirés de Mystère)

=== Quidam ===
Quidam

Soundtrack album by Benoît Jutras
- Released: January 14, 1997; June 14, 2005
- Labels: RCA Victor (1997); Cirque du Soleil Musique (2005)

Quidam (extended)

Soundtrack album by Benoît Jutras
- Released: February 19, 2002
- Recorded: March 1999 (live tracks)
- Venues: Beatrixpark, Amsterdam (live tracks)
- Label: BMG/Cirque du Soleil Musique

1. Atmadja
2. Incantation
3. Marelle
4. Rivage
5. Zydeko
6. Let Me Fall
7. Innocence
8. Carrousel
9. Steel Dream
10. Seisouso
11. Réveil
12. Quidam

==== Extended album ====
Two additional tracks were recorded live in Amsterdam. Those two tracks appear only on the "extended" edition of the CD, released February 19, 2002:

13. Misère (Banquine)
14. Enfants d'Acier (Diabolos)

=== Collection ===
Collection

Compilation album by René Dupéré & Benoît Jutras
- Released: March 24, 1998
- Label: RCA Victor

This is a compilation of songs from previous Cirque du Soleil albums, including Nouvelle Expérience, Saltimbanco, Alegría and Mystère.

1. Ouverture
2. Egypte
3. Kumbalawe
4. Suite Chinoise
5. Querer
6. Entracte
7. Pokinoï
8. Alegría
9. Kalimando
10. Grosse Femme

=== O ===
O

Soundtrack album by Benoît Jutras
- Released: November 24, 1998; August 16, 2005
- Recorded: 16-19 September, 1998
- Venue: "O" Theater at Bellagio
- Genre: Soundtrack
- Labels: RCA (1998); Cirque du Soleil Musique (2005)
- Producer: Cirque du Soleil Musique Inc.

1. Jeux d'Eau
2. Mer Noire
3. Tzelma
4. Africa
5. Remous
6. Svecounia
7. Nostalgie
8. Simcha
9. Gamelan
10. Ephra
11. Désert
12. Terre Aride
13. O

=== Alegría: The Film Soundtrack ===
Alegría: The Film Soundtrack

Soundtrack album by Benoît Jutras
- Released: March 23, 1999
- Label: RCA Victor/BMG Québec

1. Alegría [new arrangement][version]
2. Frac's Room/Frac and Train/Frac and Giulietta
3. Love Leaves Someone Behind
4. Opera/Fleur's Trailer
5. Mirko/Vai Vedrai
6. Love Leaves Someone Behind/Chase/Factory
7. Herv
8. Child in His Eyes
9. Wedding
10. Irna
11. Herv/Giulietta and Fleur
12. Filet/Make-Up/Let Love Live [instrumental]
13. Mountain of Clothes
14. Let Love Live [instrumental]
15. Let Love Live

=== La Nouba ===
La Nouba

Soundtrack album by Benoît Jutras
- Released: June 29, 1999; August 16, 2005
- Recorded: March 8-12, 1999
- Venues: Cirque du Soleil Theater, Disney Springs, Orlando
- Labels: RCA Victor (1999); Cirque du Soleil Musique (2005)

1. Once Upon A Time
2. A Tale
3. Porte
4. La Nouba
5. Distorted
6. Liama
7. Queens
8. À La Lune
9. Rêve Rouge
10. Urban
11. Propel
12. Jardin Chinois

=== Dralion ===
Dralion

Soundtrack album by Violaine Corradi
- Released: November 9, 1999; July 12, 2005
- Labels: RCA Victor (1999); Cirque du Soleil Musique (2005)

1. Stella Errans
2. Ombra
3. Spiritual Spiral
4. Miracula Aeternitatis
5. Bamboo
6. Ballare
7. Ravendhi
8. Ninkou Latora
9. Aborigenes Jam
10. Hinko
11. Kamande

=== Journey of Man ===
Journey of Man

Soundtrack album by Benoît Jutras
- Released: May 2, 2000
- Label: Sony Music Entertainment

1. Journey Of Man (vocals by Roxane Potvin)
2. Overture
3. Taiko
4. Birth
5. The Forest
6. In The Beginning
7. Youth
8. Flying
9. Réveil
10. Banquine
11. Journey Of Man (instrumental)
12. Trip Hop

=== Varekai ===
Varekai

Soundtrack album by Violaine Corradi
- Released: January 7, 2003
- Label: BMG/Cirque du Soleil Musique

1. Rain One
2. Le Rêveur
3. Vocea
4. Moon Licht
5. Patzivota
6. El Péndulo
7. Gitans
8. Kèro Hiréyo
9. Lubia Dobarstan
10. Emballa
11. Oscillum
12. Funambul
13. Resolution

==== Re-release ====
Varekai

Soundtrack album by Violaine Corradi
- Released: July 27, 2004
- Label: Cirque du Soleil Musique

This re-release contains three tracks that were not present on the original edition as standalone songs. On the original edition, "Aureus" was the intro to "Rain One", "Rubeus" was the intro to "Patzivota", and "Infinitus" was the intro to "Lubia Dobarstan".

1. Aureus
2. Rain One
3. Le Rêveur
4. Vocea
5. Moon Licht
6. Rubeus
7. Patzivota
8. El Péndulo
9. Gitans
10. Kèro Hiréyo
11. Infinitus
12. Lubia Dobarstan
13. Emballa
14. Oscillum
15. Funambul
16. Resolution

Varekai: Special Edition

Soundtrack album by Violaine Corradi
- Released: 2003
- Recorded: August 2002 (live tracks)
- Venues: Ontario Place, Toronto (live tracks)
- Label: BMG/Cirque du Soleil Musique

==== Varekai: Special Edition ====
This special edition of Varekai comes with a bonus CD and a bonus DVD. The main CD contains the 16-track version of the studio album. The bonus CD contains six tracks recorded live in Toronto in 2002 and two remix tracks. The bonus DVD contains music videos, a documentary excerpt and trailers.

- CD 1
1. Aureus
2. Rain One
3. Le Rêveur
4. Vocea
5. Moon Licht
6. Rubeus
7. Patzivota
8. El Péndulo
9. Gitans
10. Kèro Hiréyo
11. Infinitus
12. Lubia Dobarstan
13. Emballa
14. Oscillum
15. Funambul
16. Resolution
- CD 2
1. Célébration de l'Errance
2. Trasparenza
3. Euphoria
4. Sun Drum Fun
5. Mutationis
6. Movimento
7. El Péndulo - Fenomenon "Northern Comfort Mix"
8. Emballa - Llorca remix
- DVD
1. Rubeus—Patzivota (music video)
2. Moon Licht (music video)
3. The Making of an Angel
4. Varekai the Show Ad
5. Varekai DVD Ad
6. Cirque du Soleil Music Ad

=== Zumanity ===
The first Zumanity disc was launched as a promotional album in 2003, and was obtainable by purchasing the original 2003 show program. The songs on it are from the show's creation period. It is now considered a collector's item. The second album is the official album for the show; however, it is an inspired-by album based on the show's music. Most of the music is not featured in the show itself and never was.

==== Foreplay - EP ====
Foreplay

EP by Simon Carpentier
- Released: July 31, 2003
- Label: BMG/Cirque du Soleil Musique

1. The Opener
2. Major-Minor
3. The Rose Boy
4. My Erotic Lounge

==== Zumanity ====
Zumanity

Soundtrack album by Simon Carpentier
- Released: March 22, 2005
- Label: Cirque du Soleil Musique

1. Mio Bello Bello Amore
2. Entrée
3. En Zum
4. Wind
5. Another Man
6. First Taste
7. Do It Again
8. Water Bowl
9. The Good Thing
10. Tickle Tango
11. Into Me
12. Fugare
13. Meditation
14. Piece of Heaven
15. Zum Astra
16. Mangora En Zum
17. Per Sempre
18. Bello Amore

=== Le Best Of ===
Le Best Of

Compilation album by René Dupéré, Benoît Jutras and Violaine Corradi
- Released: September 21, 2004
- Label: Cirque du Soleil Musique

This compilation features music from previous Cirque shows: Saltimbanco, Alegría, Mystère, Quidam, Dralion, Varekai, La Nouba and O.

1. Égypte
2. Alegría
3. Pokinoi
4. Querer
5. Kumbalawé
6. Ombra
7. Réveil
8. Nostalgie
9. Vocea
10. Stella Errans
11. Gamelan
12. Liama

=== Kà ===
Kà

Soundtrack album by René Dupéré
- Released: October 18, 2005
- Label: Cirque du Soleil Musique

1. O Makundé
2. Pageant
3. Koudamare
4. Storm
5. Deep
6. Shadowplay
7. Pursuit
8. Forest
9. Flight
10. Threat
11. Love Dance
12. Battlefield
13. Aftermath
14. If I Could Reach Your Heart
15. We've Been Waiting So Long
16. Reach For Me Now

=== Delirium ===
Delirium

Remix album by various artists
- Released: July 25, 2006
- Label: BMG/Cirque du Soleil Musique
- Producer: Francis Collard

1. Cold Flame
2. Slipping Away
3. Someone
4. Too High
5. Walk on Water
6. Alone
7. Climb
8. La Nova Alegría
9. Lifeline
10. Bridge of Sorrow
11. One Love
12. Let Me Fall
13. Time to Go
14. Time Flies
15. Sans toi

=== Corteo ===
Corteo

Soundtrack album by Philippe Leduc and Maria Bonzanigo
- Released: October 3, 2006
- Label: Cirque du Soleil Musique
- Producer: Benoit Groulx

- CD
1. Funerale
2. Ritornare
3. Rêve d'un Pantin
4. Les chevaux à bottes
5. Nos Dejó
6. Klezmer Moment
7. Prendersi per mano
8. Anneaux
9. El cielo sabrá
10. Fugue
11. Volo Volando
12. Un tierno y dulce
13. Balade au bout d'une échelle
14. Garda Lassù
15. Triangle tango
16. Che finalone
- DVD
1. "Through the Curtain" documentary about 'Corteo' creation. Recorded months prior premiere at Old Port Montréal.

=== Love ===
Love

Remix album by The Beatles
- Released: November 21, 2006
- Label: Capitol/Apple Records
- Producers: George Martin, Giles Martin

1. Because
2. Get Back
3. Glass Onion
4. Eleanor Rigby/Julia (transition)
5. I Am the Walrus
6. I Want to Hold Your Hand
7. Drive My Car/The Word/What You're Doing
8. Gnik Nus
9. Something/Blue Jay Way (transition)
10. Being for the Benefit of Mr. Kite!/I Want You (She's So Heavy)/Helter Skelter
11. Help!
12. Blackbird/Yesterday
13. Strawberry Fields Forever
14. Within You Without You/Tomorrow Never Knows
15. Lucy in the Sky with Diamonds
16. Octopus's Garden
17. Lady Madonna
18. Here Comes the Sun/The Inner Light (transition)
19. Come Together/Dear Prudence/Cry Baby Cry (transition)
20. Revolution
21. Back in the U.S.S.R.
22. While My Guitar Gently Weeps
23. A Day in the Life
24. Hey Jude
25. Sgt. Pepper's Lonely Hearts Club Band (reprise)
26. All You Need Is Love

Digital bonus tracks

1. The Fool on the Hill
2. Girl

==== Love: Special Edition ====
Love: Special Edition

Remix album by The Beatles
- Released: November 21, 2006
- Label: Capitol/Apple Records
- Producers: George Martin, Giles Martin

This Special Edition includes the regular Love CD and an Audio DVD that offers higher-quality sound in several formats including DVD-Audio MLP, DTS, Dolby and PCM.

=== Wintuk ===
Wintuk

Soundtrack album by Simon Carpentier
- Released: November 1, 2007
- Label: Cirque du Soleil Musique

1. Something's Missing
2. Shadows
3. Beyond the Clouds
4. Dogs will be Dogs!
5. He's Scared of His Shadow
6. Norah Knows
7. Heading North
8. Back Where We Belong
9. Northern Folk
10. Elena
11. Ice Giants
12. Dolce Luce
13. Tundra Ballet
14. We Want to See it Snow
15. Nothing's Missing
16. Snowstorm

=== Koozå ===
Koozå

Soundtrack album by Jean-François Coté
- Released: June 24, 2008
- Label: Cirque du Soleil Musique

1. Kooza Dance
2. Superstar I
3. L'Innocent
4. Royaume
5. Junoon
6. Alambre Alto
7. 16- Papillon
8. Pearl
9. Cabaret Satã
10. Aankh Micholi
11. Diables
12. El Péndulo de la Muerte
13. Petit-Jaune
14. Superstar II
15. Imposteur
16. Prarthana
17. Don't Be Afraid
18. Hum Jaisa Na Dekha

=== Zaia ===
Zaia

Soundtrack album by Violaine Corradi
- Released: May 26, 2009
- Recorded: July 2008
- Venue: ZAIA Theater at The Venetian Macao
- Label: Cirque du Soleil Musique

1. Noi
2. Aestus Calor
3. Ignis
4. Hatahkinn
5. Aquilex
6. Comissatio
7. Blue Ales
8. Adrideo
9. Ardor Oris
10. Aequor Oris
11. Caelestis
12. Undae
13. Temperatio
14. Ellâm Onru
15. Gaudiumni
16. Utinam

=== 25 ===
25

Compilation album by Various artists
- Released: June 23, 2009
- Label: Cirque du Soleil Musique

This compilation is a 25th-anniversary collection of music from 25 different Cirque du Soleil shows.

- Poetique
1. Ouverture (Cirque Réinventé)
2. Le Funambule (Cirque du Soleil and La Magie Continue)
3. Méandres (Nouvelle Expérience and Fascination)
4. Havi Vahlia (Nouvelle Expérience)
5. Vai Vedrai (Alegría)
6. A Tale (La Nouba)
7. Piece of Heaven (Zumanity)
8. Volo Volando (Corteo)
9. Beyond the Clouds (Wintuk)
10. Sexy Pet (Criss Angel Believe)
11. The Worlds Meet (Zed)
12. Banquete (Ovo)
13. Alegría (Alegría, le film)
- Dynamique
1. Le Cirque du Soleil (Cirque du Soleil)
2. Les Pingouins (Cirque du Soleil and Cirque Reinventé)
3. Barock (Saltimbanco)
4. Rivage (Quidam)
5. Birimbau (Mystère)
6. Svecounia (O)
7. Ravendhi (Dralion)
8. Lubia Dobarstan (Varekai)
9. Pursuit (Kà)
10. One Love (Delirium)
11. Hum Jaisa Na Dekha (Koozå)
12. Utinam (Zaia)

=== Zed ===
Zed

Soundtrack album by René Dupéré
- Released: October 13, 2009
- Venues: Cirque du Soleil Theater, Tokyo
- Label: Cirque du Soleil Musique

1. First Incantation
2. Birth of the Sky
3. Reaching Up
4. Blue Silk
5. High Temptation
6. Vaneyou Mile
7. Zed in Love
8. Kernoon's Fire
9. Mirror of the Two Worlds
10. The Worlds Meet
11. Fiesta
12. Hymn of the Worlds

=== Ovo ===
Ovo

Soundtrack album by Berna Ceppas
- Released: April 13, 2010
- Recorded: The Canterbury Studios (Toronto); Estudio Monoaual (Rio de Janeiro); Studio Paradiso (San Francisco); Studio Fast Forward (Montréal)
- Length: 73:49
- Label: Cirque du Soleil Musique

1. Brisa Do Mar
2. Foreigner
3. Ants
4. Cocoon
5. Frevo Zumbido
6. Orvalho
7. Carimbó Da Creatura
8. Love Duet
9. Scarabées
10. Sexy Web
11. Legs
12. Flea Girls
13. Super Hero
14. Secret Samba Luv
15. Parede
16. Banquete

=== Totem ===
Totem

Soundtrack album by Guy Dubuc, Marc Lessard
- Released: October 6, 2010
- Length: 65:45
- Label: Cirque du Soleil Musique

1. Omé Kayo
2. Cum Sancto Spiritu
3. Indie-Hip
4. Koumaya
5. Crystal Pyramid
6. Thunder
7. Toreador
8. Qué Viyéra
9. Mr. Beaker
10. Onta
11. Kunda Tayé
12. Fast Boat
13. Terre-Mère
14. Ome Yo Kanoubé

=== Criss Angel Believe ===
Criss Angel Believe

Soundtrack album by Éric Serra
- Released: February 1, 2011
- Length: 64:31
- Label: Cirque du Soleil Musique

1. Homage to the Rabbits
2. The Life Factory
3. Sexy Pet
4. Flying with the Birds
5. Kayala and the Poppies
6. Sympathy for Crimson
7. The Magic Door
8. The Cockroach Dance
9. In and Out of the Dream
10. Shadows and Whispers
11. Being Houdini I
12. Being Houdini II
13. Prewed
14. Blow Me a Tornado
15. She is Gone to the Sky
16. The Magic Wedding

=== Viva Elvis ===
Viva Elvis

Soundtrack album by Elvis Presley
- Released: November 9, 2010
- Length: 41:42
- Label: Sony Legacy Recordings
- Producer: Eric van Tourneau

1. Opening
2. Blue Suede Shoes
3. That's All Right
4. Heartbreak Hotel
5. Love Me Tender
6. King Creole
7. Bossa Nova Baby
8. Burning Love
9. Memories
10. Can't Help Falling In Love
11. You'll Never Walk Alone (piano interlude)
12. Suspicious Minds

==== Viva Elvis (bonus album) ====
In each country, a bonus version of "Love Me Tender" was included, featuring a local singer in place of the singer from the Cirque du Soleil show.

13. Love Me Tender (featuring Thalía in the US and Latin America)

=== Michael Jackson: Immortal ===
Michael Jackson: Immortal

Remix album by Michael Jackson
- Released: November 21, 2011
- Recorded: 1969–2009; Remixed: 2010–2011
- Genres: R&B, pop, soul, rock
- Label: Epic Records

==== Standard edition ====
1. "Workin' Day And Night" (Immortal version)
2. "The Immortal Intro" (Immortal version)
3. "Childhood" (Immortal version)
4. "Wanna Be Startin' Somethin'" (Immortal version)
5. "Dancing Machine/Blame It On The Boogie" (Immortal version)
6. "This Place Hotel" (Immortal version)
7. "Smooth Criminal" (Immortal version)
8. "Dangerous (Immortal version)
9. The Jackson 5 Medley: "I Want You Back"/"ABC"/"The Love You Save" (Immortal version)
10. "Speechless"/"Human Nature" (Immortal version)
11. "Is It Scary"/"Threatened" (Immortal version)
12. "Thriller" (Immortal version)
13. "You Are Not Alone"/"I Just Can't Stop Loving You" (Immortal version)
14. "Beat It"/"State of Shock" (Immortal version)
15. "Jam" (Immortal version)
16. "Planet Earth/Earth Song" (Immortal version)
17. "They Don't Care About Us" (Immortal version)
18. "I'll Be There" (Immortal version)
19. "Immortal Megamix: Can You Feel It/Don't Stop 'Til You Get Enough/Billie Jean/Black or White" (Immortal version)
20. "Man in the Mirror" (Immortal version)

==== Deluxe edition ====
Disc 1

1. "Working Day and Night" (Immortal version)
2. "The Immortal Intro" (Immortal version)
3. "Childhood" (Immortal version)
4. "Wanna Be Startin' Somethin'" (Immortal version)
5. "Shake Your Body (Down to the Ground)" (Immortal version)
6. "Dancing Machine/Blame It on the Boogie" (Immortal version)
7. "Ben" (Immortal version)
8. "This Place Hotel" (Immortal version)
9. "Smooth Criminal" (Immortal version)
10. "Dangerous" (Immortal version)
11. The Mime Segment: "(I Like) The Way You Love Me"/"Speed Demon"/"Another Part of Me" (Immortal version)
12. J5 Medley: "I Want You Back"/"ABC"/"The Love You Save" (Immortal version)
13. "Speechless/Human Nature" (Immortal version)
14. "Is It Scary/Threatened" (Immortal version)
15. "Thriller" (Immortal version)

Disc 2

1. "You Are Not Alone"/"I Just Can't Stop Loving You" (Immortal version)
2. "Beat It"/"State of Shock" (Immortal version)
3. "Jam" (Immortal version)
4. "Planet Earth"/"Earth Song" (Immortal version)
5. "Scream"/"Little Susie" (Immortal version)
6. "Gone Too Soon" (Immortal version)
7. "They Don't Care About Us" (Immortal version)
8. "Will You Be There" (Immortal version)
9. "I'll Be There" (Immortal version)
10. Immortal Megamix: "Can You Feel It"/"Don't Stop 'til You Get Enough"/"Billie Jean"/"Black or White" (Immortal version)
11. "Man in the Mirror" (Immortal version)
12. "Remember the Time"/"Bad" (Immortal version)

=== Iris ===
Iris

Soundtrack album by Danny Elfman
- Released: November 21, 2011
- Label: Cirque du Soleil Musique

1. Buster's Big Opening
2. The Twins
3. Kiriki Film
4. Kiriki
5. Silent Movie
6. Patterns
7. Clown Special Effects
8. Pellicule (Part I & II)
9. Snake Women
10. Movie Studio
11. The Broom
12. Flying Scarlett
13. Old Toys
14. Film Noir/Pursuit
15. Rooftops
16. Scarlett Balancing
17. Iris Finale and Bows

=== Le Best Of 2 ===
Le Best Of 2

Compilation album by Various artists
- Released: November 6, 2012
- Label: Cirque du Soleil Musique

This compilation features music from previous Cirque shows: Amaluna, Kooza, Zed, Corteo, Believe, Zaia, Ovo, Ka, Wintuk, Zumanity and Totem.

1. Magic Ceremony I
2. Pearl
3. Blue Silk
4. Anneaux
5. Flying Scarlett
6. Qué Viyéra
7. Flying with the Birds
8. Noi
9. Secret Samba Luv
10. Pageant
11. Beyond the Clouds
12. Piece of Heaven
13. Omé Yo Kanoubé

=== Amaluna ===
Amaluna

Soundtrack album by Guy Dubuc, Marc Lessard
- Released: November 20, 2012
- Label: Cirque du Soleil Musique

1. All Come Together
2. Elma Om Mi Lize
3. Tempest
4. Enchanted Reunion
5. Fly Around
6. Hope
7. O Ma Ley
8. Burn Me Up
9. Whisper
10. Running On the Edge
11. Ena Fee Alyne
12. Creature of Light
13. Mutation
14. Run

=== Zarkana ===
Zarkana

Soundtrack album by Nick Littlemore
- Released: July 23, 2013
- Label: Cirque du Soleil Musique

1. Antlia
2. Zawraq
3. Eridanus
4. Caph
5. Crysococca
6. Kuma
7. Tarientar / The Archer
8. Gienah
9. Rae
10. Tourago / Guiram
11. Jarseate
12. Asteraw

=== Kurios: Cabinets Des Curiosités ===
Kurios: Cabinets Des Curiosités

Soundtrack album by Guy Dubuc, Marc Lessard
- Released: December 9, 2014
- Label: Cirque du Soleil Musique

1. 11h11
2. Steampunk Telegram
3. Bella Donna Twist
4. Gravity Levitas
5. Monde Inversé
6. Hypnotique
7. Departure
8. Fearsome Flight
9. Clouds
10. Créature De Siam
11. Wat U No Wen
12. You Must Be Joking

=== JOYÀ ===
JOYÀ

Soundtrack album by Guy Dubuc, Marc Lessard
- Released: January 15, 2016
- Label: Cirque du Soleil Musique

1. Naturalium
2. Comedy of Errors
3. Reinas En La Penumbra
4. Adventure at Sea
5. The Dive
6. Profunda Belleza
7. Legacy
8. Nueva Era

=== Toruk – The First Flight ===
Toruk – The First Flight

Soundtrack album by Guy Dubuc, Marc Lessard
- Released: February 5, 2016
- Label: Cirque du Soleil Musique

1. Omaticaya Clan
2. Lu Aw Navi
3. Shaman Story
4. Tawkami Clan
5. The Anurai Clan Sanctuary
6. Viperwolves and the Tipani Clan
7. Direhorses
8. Kekunan Clan
9. Hallelujah Mountains
10. The Toruk
11. Luminous Reunion

=== Luzia ===
==== Luzia ====
Luzia

Soundtrack album by Simon Carpentier
- Released: May 13, 2016
- Label: Cirque du Soleil Musique

1. Asi Es La Vida
2. Tiembla La Tierra
3. Flores En El Desierto
4. Pambolero
5. Pez Volador
6. Los Mosquitos
7. Alebrijes
8. Tlaloc
9. Cierra Los Ojos
10. Fiesta Finale

==== Luzia (Live) ====
Luzia (Live)

Soundtrack album by Simon Carpentier
- Released: March 14, 2025
- Recorded: August-December, 2018
- Label: Cirque du Soleil Musique

1. Corre
2. Así Es La Vida
3. Tiembla La Tierra
4. Flores En El Desierto
5. Pez Volador
6. Cierra Los Ojos
7. Los Mosquitos
8. La Lucha
9. Tlaloc
10. Marimba no.7
11. Alebrijes
12. El swing del amor
13. Fiesta Finale
14. Pambolero (Physical edition bonus track)

=== Paramour ===
Paramour

Soundtrack album by Guy Dubuc, Marc Lessard
- Released: August 26, 2016
- Label: Cirque du Soleil Musique

1. The Hollywood Wiz
2. Ginger Top
3. Something More
4. AJ's Blues
5. The Muse
6. Serenade from a Window
7. The Honeymoon Days of Fame
8. Cleopatra
9. Egyptian Gift
10. Help a Girl Choose
11. The Dream
12. Revenge Fantasies
13. Love Triangle
14. Writer's Block
15. Everything (The Lover's Theme)
16. NYC Rooftops
17. Reel Love
18. Everything (Reprise)

=== Sep7imo Dia (No Descansaré) ===
Sep7imo Dia

Remix album by Soda Stereo
- Released: March 9, 2017
- Label: Sony Music/Sony Music
- Producers: Charly Alberti, Zeta Bosio Adrian Taverna

1. En El Septimo Dia
2. Cae El Sol / Planta
3. Picnic en el 4ºB / Te Hacen Falta Vitaminas / Mi Novia Tiene Biceps
4. Ella Uso / Un Misil
5. Profugos
6. En Remolinos
7. Planeador
8. Persiana Americana
9. Signos
10. Un Millon De Años Luz
11. Intro Luna Roja
12. Luna Roja
13. Crema de Estrellas
14. Cuando Pase el Temblor
15. Hombre Al Agua
16. Sueles Dejarme Solo
17. En La Ciudad de La Furia
18. Efecto Doppler
19. Primavera 0
20. De Musica Ligera
21. Terapia de Amor Intensiva

=== VOLTA ===
VOLTA

Soundtrack album by Anthony Gonzalez
- Released: September 20, 2017
- Label: Cirque du Soleil Musique

1. To the Stars
2. Dancing Ants
3. The Bee and the Wind
4. Man Craft
5. Modern Jungle
6. Inside Me
7. The Change
8. Suspension
9. Elevation
10. Lone Soul
11. Battle of the Man
12. Like Kids

=== Stone: Hommage à Plamondon ===
Stone: Hommage à Plamondon

Soundtrack album by Various artists
- Released: May 18, 2018
- Recorded: Spring 2017
- Studios: Studio l'Gros, XS Music, Studio Dandurand
- Genre: Chanson
- Label: XS Music
- Producer: Jean-Phi Gonclaves

All lyrics are written by Luc Plamondon.

No.	Title	Music	Artist(s)	Length
1.	"Le Parc Belmont"	Christian St-Roch	Martha Wainwright	5:45
2.	"Monopolis"	Michel Berger	Milk & Bone	4:59
3.	"Oxygène"	Germain Gauthier	Betty Bonifassi	5:31
4.	"Le Monde est stone"	Berger	Beyries	6:58
5.	"Lili voulait aller danser"	Julien Clerc	La Bronze	4:38
6.	"Ma mère chantait toujours"	François Cousineau	Marie-Pierre Arthur	3:53
7.	"L'Île aux mimosas"	Barbara	Klô Pelgag	3:51
8.	"Je danse dans ma tête"	Romano Musumarra	Marie-Mai	4:13
9.	"Call Girl"	Gauthier	Valérie Carpentier	4:29
10.	"Tiens‐toé ben j'arrive!"	Cousineau	Catherine Major	5:46
11.	"Le Blues du businessman"	Berger	Safia Nolin	5:37
12.	"Les Sans-papiers"	Riccardo Cocciante	Marie-Josée Lord	3:44
13.	"S.O.S d'un terrien en détresse"	Berger	Ariane Moffatt	4:48
14.	"Le Monde est fou"	St-Roch	Gabrielle Shonk	3:49
15.	"L'Hymne à la beauté du monde"	St-Roch	Tous les acrobates, techniciens et concepteurs du spectacle	3:34
Total length:				71:42

=== Alegría: In a New Light ===
Alegría: In a New Light

Soundtrack album by Jean-Phi Goncalves & René Dupéré
- Released: August 16, 2019
- Label: Cirque du Soleil Musique

With the announcement of a revamped re-imagining of Alegría show on April 25, 2018, Jean-Phi Goncalves was chosen to rework, remix, and compose newly arranged music for using the original music composed by René Dupéré. An official announcement for the release of Alegría: In a New Light soundtrack was announced by Cirque du Soleil on August 12, 2019. The album was released on August 16.

1. Mirko
2. Kalandéro
3. Querer
4. Cerceaux
5. Jeux d'enfants
6. Alegría
7. Ibis
8. Irna / Valsapena
9. Taruka
10. Vai vedrai
11. Malioumba
12. Valsajoïa
13. Alegría (Encore)

=== 'Twas the Night Before ===
'Twas the Night Before

Soundtrack album by Jean-Phi Goncalves
- Released: December 6, 2019
- Label: Cirque du Soleil Musique

1. 'Twas the Night Before...
2. God Rest You Merry, Gentlemen
3. Jolly
4. Up on the Rooftop
5. The Spark
6. O Come, O Come, Emmanuel
7. O Holy Night
8. Angels We Have Heard on High
9. O Christmas Tree
10. Shchedryk
11. Do You Hear What I Hear?
12. Deck the Halls
13. Joy of the World

=== Songblazers ===
Songblazers

Soundtrack album
- Released: July 19, 2024
- Label: Cirque du Soleil Musique

1. Will the Circle Be Unbroken
2. I'm So Lonesome I Could Cry
3. Blue Moon of Kentucky (feat. Sam Bush & Dan Tyminski)
4. Where Shall I Be
5. Cattle Call
6. Copperhead Road
7. Cattle Call - Reprise
8. Workin' Man Blues
9. Traveller
10. Cowboy Take Me Away
11. New Muleskinner Blues
12. Achy Breaky Heart (feat. Rob Ickes)
13. Orange Blossom Special / Devil Went Down to Georgia (feat. Tommy Emmanuel)
14. Down to the River to Pray
15. I'm So Lonesome I Could Cry - Reprise
16. Carnival Heart
17. Will the Circle Be Unbroken - Reprise

=== ECHO ===
ECHO

Soundtrack album by POLYPHONIA & Hugo Montecristo
- Released: November 15, 2024
- Label: Cirque du Soleil Musique

1. Hide & Seek
2. Echo
3. Symbiosis
4. The Cartographer
5. Magic in the Air
6. Fireflies
7. Resist and Express
8. Giant Puppet
9. A Dark Cloud
10. Animals in Peril
11. Rebuild
12. A Dog's Love
13. Future
14. Celebrate Connection
15. Network

=== 40 Years Under the Sun - The Best of Cirque du Soleil ===
40 Years Under the Sun - The Best of Cirque du Soleil

Compilation album by various
- Released: December 6, 2024
- Label: Cirque du Soleil Musique

1. Alegria
2. Pokinoi
3. Pageant
4. Brisa Do Mar
5. Marelle
6. Volo volando
7. Pearl
8. Egypte
9. 11h11
10. Tzelma
11. Qué Viyéra
12. Naturalium
13. Bella Donna Twist
14. Creature of Light
15. Stella Errans
16. Animals in Peril
17. The Bee and the Wind
18. Alegría

== Remixes ==
=== Tapis Rouge: Solarium ===
Tapis Rouge: Solarium

Remix album by various artists
- Released: October 19, 2004
- Label: Cirque du Soleil

1. Ombra – Lenny Ibizarre remix
2. Alegría – A Man Called Adam's Magical remix
3. A Tale – Chilluminati mix
4. El Péndulo – Fenomenon "Northern Comfort Mix"
5. Africa – Cottonbelly remix
6. Nocturne – Christophe Goze remix
7. Le Rêveur – Thievery Corporation remix
8. Gamelan – Cantoma remix
9. Ombra – After Life remix
10. Africa – Banzai Republic "Equator Bound Mix"

=== Solarium/Delirium ===
Solarium/Delirium

Remix album by various artists
- Released: May 17, 2005
- Label: Cirque du Soleil Musique

- CD 1
1. Ombra (Lenny Ibizarre remix)
2. Alegría (A Man called Adam's Magical Mix)
3. A Tale (Chilluminati mix)
4. El Pendulo (Fenomenon "Northern Comfort Mix")
5. Africa (Cottonbelly remix)
6. Nocturne (Christophe Goze remix)
7. Le Reveur (Thievery Corporation remix)
8. Gamelan (Cantoma remix)
9. Ombra (Afterlife mix)
10. Africa (Banzai Republic "Equator Bound Mix")
- CD 2
1. Emballa (Louie Vega featuring Jaffa "Album Mix")
2. Querer (Julien Jabre remix)
3. Kumbalawe (Roger Sanchez release mix)
4. Aborigenes Jam (Frangois K / Eric Kupper "Vocal Mix")
5. Pokinoi (Sasha remix)
6. Africa (Quicksound / Alain Vinet remix)
7. Terre Aride (Jori Hulkkonen remix)
8. Spiritual Spiral (Carmen Rizzo remix)
9. Mer Noire (Tiësto remix)

=== Tapis Rouge vinyl mixes ===
Limited editions of previously released remixes in vinyl format (vinyl 12-inch, White Label, 33⅓ RPM) have been released by Cirque du Soleil Musique and sold in Canada and the United States.

==== Vol. 1: Africa ====
- LP Record (May 16, 2006)
- Original Release Date: May 16, 2006
- Format: Limited Edition
- Label: Cirque du Soleil Musique
- ASIN: MISSING

Track list:

- A1 – Africa (Cottonbelly remix)
- A2 – A Tale (Chilluminati mix)
- B1 – Le Reveur (Thievery Corporation remix)
- B2 – Emballa (Llorca remix)

==== Vol. 2: Ombra ====
- LP Record (May 16, 2006)
- Original Release Date: May 16, 2006
- Format: Limited Edition
- Label: Cirque du Soleil Musique
- ASIN: B000EWBOLI

Track list:

- Ombra (Afterlife remix)
- Gamelan (Cantoma remix)
- Africa (Banzai Republic Equator Bound mix)
- El Péndulo (Fenomenon Northern Comfort mix)

==== Vol. 3: Aborigenes Jam ====
- LP Record (May 16, 2006)
- Original Release Date: May 16, 2006
- Format: Limited Edition
- Label: Cirque du Soleil Musique
- ASIN: B000EWBOKO

Track list:

- Aborigenes Jam (vocal mix)
- Aborigenes Jam (dub mix)

==== Vol. 4: Emballa ====
- LP Record (May 16, 2006)
- Original Release Date: May 16, 2006
- Format: Limited Edition
- Label: Cirque du Soleil Musique
- ASIN: B000EWBOLS

Track list:

- Emballa (album mix) (Louie Vega feat. Jaffa)
- Emballa (Ritual mix) (Louie Vega feat. Jaffa)
- Emballa (Sun dub) (Louie Vega feat. Jaffa)

==== Vol. 5: Kumbalawe ====
- LP Record (May 16, 2006)
- Original Release Date: May 16, 2006
- Format: Limited Edition
- Label: Cirque du Soleil Musique
- ASIN: B000EWBOKY

Track list:

- Kumbalawé (Roger Sanchez release mix)
- Kumbalawé (Roger Sanchez release the dub)

==== Vol. 6: Mer Noire ====
- LP Record (May 16, 2006)
- Original Release Date: May 16, 2006
- Format: Limited Edition
- Label: Cirque du Soleil Musique
- ASIN: B000EWBOKE

Track list:

- A – Mer Noire (Tiësto remix)
- B – Africa (Quicksound remix)

==== Vol. 7: Tapis Rouge Remixed ====
- LP Record (May 16, 2006)
- Original Release Date: May 16, 2006
- Format: Limited Edition
- Label: Cirque du Soleil Musique

Track list:

- A1. A Tale (Chilluminati remix)
- A2. Rumeurs (John Beltran remix)
- B1. Gamelan (Cantoma remix)
- B2. Africa (Banzai Republic remix)

=== "Montreal Remixes"VA ===
"Montreal Remixes"VA

Remix album by various
- Released: July 25, 2025
- Label: Cirque du Soleil Musique

1. Cum Sancto Spiritu – Guy Laliberte Remix
2. Temperatio – Hicky & Kalo Remix
3. Tzelma – Soul of Zoo Remix
4. Hatahkinn – Hauy Remix
5. Fiesta Finale – Dexter Crowe Remix
6. Terre Aride – Jares Remix
7. Pambolero – Tyler W, Hauy, Soul of Zoo Remix
