= Francesca Gagnon =

Canadian singer (born 1957)

- Born: August 6, 1957 (age 68); Jonquière, Quebec, Canada
- Genres: World music
- Occupation: singer
- Label: Galios Musique
- Website: francescagagnon.com

Francesca Gagnon (born August 6, 1957) is a Canadian singer and theatre actress featured in Cirque du Soleil's Alegría and Midnight Sun. During her career of more than two decades, she has recorded several solo albums and toured three continents singing in French, English, Italian and Spanish.

== Background ==
Born in Jonquière, Quebec, Francesca Gagnon began studying piano and dance at the age of ten. This interest in the arts carried over into adulthood where she continued her study of music at the Université du Québec à Montréal. Her first musical performances were on television, followed by live solo performances in Quebec, Europe, and Africa. In 1986, after recording her first album, Francesca received a Juno Award nomination for "Most Promising Female Vocalist of the Year".

In 1994, Francesca joined Cirque du Soleil's Alegría troupe. She featured as the principal vocalist on Alegría's soundtrack, which went on to become Cirque du Soleil's best-selling album. It was nominated for a Grammy Award and several Félix Awards in 1995, winning two of the latter. Alegría was also ranked on the Billboard World Music Chart for 65 weeks.

Francesca continued touring with Alegría and starred as 'The White Singer' in the 2001 DVD recorded live in Sydney. During this period, she also performed with the troupe on The Tonight Show and before Prince Charles at the Royal Albert Hall in England. Although she left Cirque in 2002 to resume her solo career, Francesca returned to sing Alegría's title track at the 25th anniversary of the Montreal Jazz Festival and the 20th anniversary of Cirque du Soleil in 2004. That concert, directed by Michel Lemieux and Victor Pilon, has been released on DVD as Cirque du Soleil's Midnight Sun.

Since returning to her solo career, she released her newest album Hybride in 2005 after two years of production. On the album, Francesca sings in a language of her creation inspired by the musical tones of different languages. The reasoning behind this was that she "wanted to transport us to a world where the language exists on a universal level without any border of race, country or words."

== Selected discography ==
Year	Title	Notes
2010	Meridiano	work with Inti-Illimani
2005	Hybride	–
2004	Le Best of Cirque du Soleil	compilation album
1999	Au delà des couleurs	–
1994	Alegría	Cirque du Soleil
1988	Francesca	–
1985	Magie	–

== Filmography ==
Year	Title	Role
2004	Cirque du Soleil presents Midnight Sun	The White Singer
2001	Cirque du Soleil presents Alegría	The White Singer
