= Alegría (Cirque du Soleil song) =

Pop song by Cirque du Soleil

Single by Cirque du Soleil

from the album Alegría
- Released: 1994
- Genre: Pop
- Length: 5:47
- Label: Cirque du Soleil Musique Inc.
- Songwriters: René Dupéré, Claude Amesse, Franco Dragone, Manuel Tadros

Audio sample
- "Alegría": file; help

"Alegría" is a pop song by Cirque du Soleil (from their show of the same name), which was recorded in 1994 with the voice of Francesca Gagnon.

The song is a multi-lingual adaptation (in English, Italian and Spanish) of another Cirque du Soleil song titled "Un pazzo gridar", written by René Dupéré and Franco Dragone and featuring Italian-only lyrics. "Un pazzo gridar" is also a song from the show Alegría.

In 1999, Cirque du Soleil recorded a new version of the song for their film "Alegría, the Film". This new version was also included in the soundtrack of the movie, and received a Genie Award nomination for Best Original Song at the 20th Genie Awards.

In 2006, Cirque du Soleil recorded a new multi-lingual adaptation (in English, Portuguese and Spanish) titled "La nova alegría" for their arena show Delirium. This new adaptation was written by René Dupéré, Robert Dillon, Franco Dragone, Paolo Ramos and Manuel Tadros.

In April 2019, Cirque du Soleil premiered a new version of the song in Alegría: In A New Light, a remount of the original show to honor its 25th anniversary. Composer Jean-Phi Goncalves wrote modern interpretations of the show’s original songs. The 2019 version uses the original 1994 lyrics written by Réne Dupéré and Franco Dragone.

== Adaptations ==
"Alegría" was adapted in Hungarian by Ibolya Oláh under the title "Magyarország" ("Hungary") on her 2005 LP "Édes méreg" with different lyrics by Péter Geszti, and in Finnish by Katri Helena under the title "Minä toivon" ("I Hope").
