= Philippe Leduc =

- Origin: Montreal, Quebec, Canada
- Genres: New Classical; World Fusion
- Occupation: Composer
- Years active: 1975 – present
- Website: philippeleduc.com

Philippe Leduc (born 1951 in Montreal, Quebec, Canada) is a Quebecois composer, conductor, author and arranger.

== Discography ==
=== Albums ===
- Diginada (2010)
- The Wings of Fire, Volume I: Blood (1995)
- The Wings of Fire, Volume II: Toil (1997)
- Splendeur & Misère (Previously released as "Éclair de Lune") (1993)

=== Compilations ===
- Mes Grands Classiques (2009)

=== Books ===
- Les Ailes du Feu (1997, Éditions STANKE)

=== Children's Albums/books ===
- Chabicouin au Marais long (CD)
- Chabicouin à la ferme (CD)
- Chabicouin au Marais long (Livre-CD)
- Shubiquack (CD)

=== Concerts ===
- The Wings of Fire (Montreal, Canada)

=== Videos ===
- No Pasaràn
- Anastasia Élégie
- The Wings of Fire, Volume II: Toil
- The Wings of Fire, Volume I: Blood

== Awards ==
- 2005
  - SOCAN Award Movie and television music
  - Triple platinum (300,000 albums sold) Marie-Hélène Thibert, self-titled album, arrangements, orchestration, and production of the song "Le Ciel est à moi"
- 2004
  - SOCAN Award Movie and television music
- 2003
  - GEMINI Award Best Musical Theme, Television, "Zone Libre"
- 2001
  - Grand Prize Concours Grafika, "Docs en Stock"
- 1998
  - Harmony Award 42nd Competition for Films and Videos (Japan)
  - Silver Award New York Festival TV Programming and Television "Les Beaux Dimanches"
- 1996
  - 1996 ADISQ Awards
    - Prix Félix, Arranger of the Year "The Wings of Fire, Volume I: Blood"
- 1995
  - 1995 ADISQ Awards
    - Prix Félix – Instrumental Album of the Year "Éclair de Lune"
- 1994
  - 1994 SOCAN Award
    - Movie and television music
