= Vladimir Olshansky =

Russian-American actor

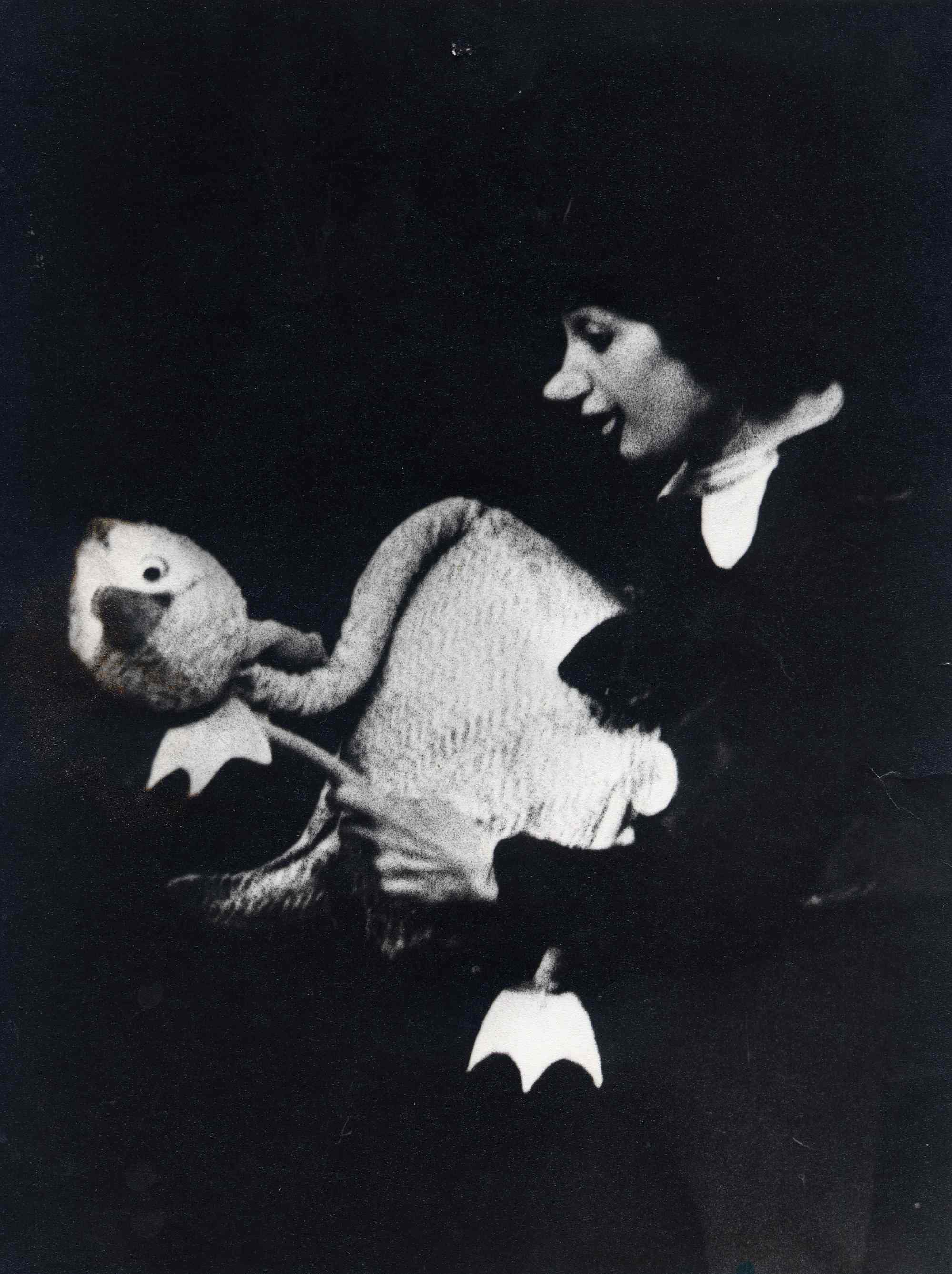
- "The Swan". Variety Theatre St. Petersburg, Russia
- Born: August 9, 1947 (age 78); St. Petersburg, Russia

Comedy career
- Years active: 1947–present
- Genres: performing artist, clown, mime, visual theater
- Website: www.artdelajoie.com/art_de_la_joie/Accueil.html www.soccorsoclown.it/default.htm

Vladimir Olshansky (born 9 August 1947 in St. Petersburg, Russia) is a performing artist, director, composer, sculptor, graduate of the Moscow State Circus School (Russian: Государственное училище циркового и эстрадного искусства им. М. Н. Румянцева (Карандаша) (ГУЦЭИ)), together with clown Slava Polunin, he is the founder of the clown theatre company Litsedei (Лицедеи). He creates numerous one man shows and performs at the Leningrad's State Variety Theatre (Ленингрдский Государственный Театр Эстрады), In parallel he studies directing at the Leningrad's State Theatre and Cinema Institute (ЛГИТМИК)

At the end of 1980s Vladimir moves to New York, where he becomes a supervisor hospital clown, working with New York's Big Apple Circus's Clown Care Unit, and with his one-person show at La Mama Theatre of New York.

He works with Slava Polunin playing the part of the main Yellow Clown character in his Slava's Snowshow at The Old Vic theatre in London as well, as in the other theatres throughout Europe and the United States. In 1996, Vladimir, with brother Yury and Caterina Turi Bicocchi founds Soccorso Clown, Italian non-for-profit, performing arts organization at the service of the Community, and becomes its artistic director. In 2006 Vladimir begins to work on "Strange Games" show, which will accompany him in years to come always with the new developments and innovative structural changes which he brings to the various International Festivals in Edinburgh, Avignon etc. In 2014, he creates Olshansky "Art De La Joiе " Compagnie Théâtrale and the Association Art De La Joie in Paris, France with the show The Laughter which he presents in Madrid, Spain, Italy and the United States. Presently, Vladimir Olshansky lives and works in Rome, Italy.

== Biography ==
=== Early years ===
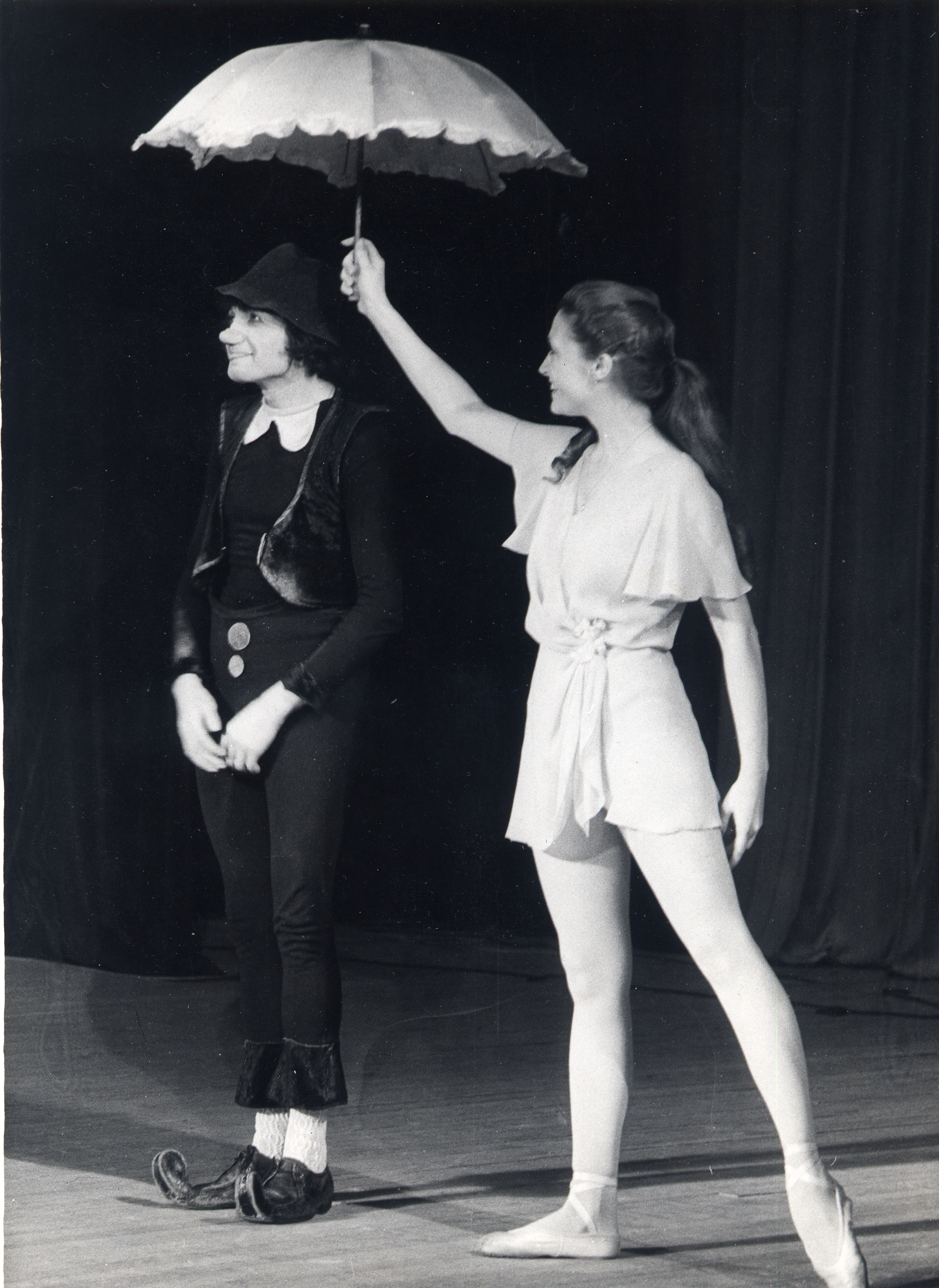
Vladimir & Yelena Olshansky, Leningrad, 70th

The Russian period marks the research and establishment of Olshansky's personal views on clown theatre and his personal style, as actor-clown, which he expresses through the fascinating genre, of the "metaphysical comedy". His views about clowns were formed by the masters of silent film: Charlie Chaplin, Max Linder and Buster Keaton - along with such legendary Russian directors as Meyerhold and Vakhtangov. He begins his theatrical study first, at the age 16, with the actor-director Anatoly Shaginian, taking part in his Brecht show. in 1970, Olshansky graduates from the prestigious Moscow Circus School. In the following years he works as an actor at the State Krasnoyarsk Theatre for Youth, with the directors Cama Ginkas, and Geta Yanovskaya, now, directors of the State Moscow Theatre for Youth (ТЮЗ). During his study of the circus arts he meets the outstanding Russian clown Leonid Engibarov who makes a great impression on him inspiring his dream to create, one day, his own clown-theatre. Engibarov was the first clown to combine the arts of both the circus and the theatre. During the period, from the early 1970s to the 1980s, Olshansky collaborates with the Russian directors: Lev Stukalov (now artistic director of St. Petersburg's "Our Theatre" (Наш Театр), Vlad Druzinin and Yuri Gerzman, Victor Charitonov, the artist and papet maker Natalia Lazareva, set designers: Simon Pastuch, Emil Kapelush, caricaturist Victor Bogorad, and creates his sketch "The Swan" becoming a winner at the International Moscow Entertainment Competition. Later on he creates the various one man shows ("The time of fun," (Час Потехи) "That's the Life" (Такая жизнь...) "Love and Clowns" (Любовь и Клоуны) with Yelena, his wife and partner at that time, which he performs at the Leningrad's State Variety Theatre. (Ленинградский Государственный Театр Эстрады) As a composer, Olshansky creates numerous songs and leaders, on the words of Russian poets:Alexander Blok, Alexander Pushkin, Aleksey Konstantinovich Tolstoy, and wins an important young songwriters competition, with his song on the words of the Russian writer and poet Alexander Grin.

=== Career development ===
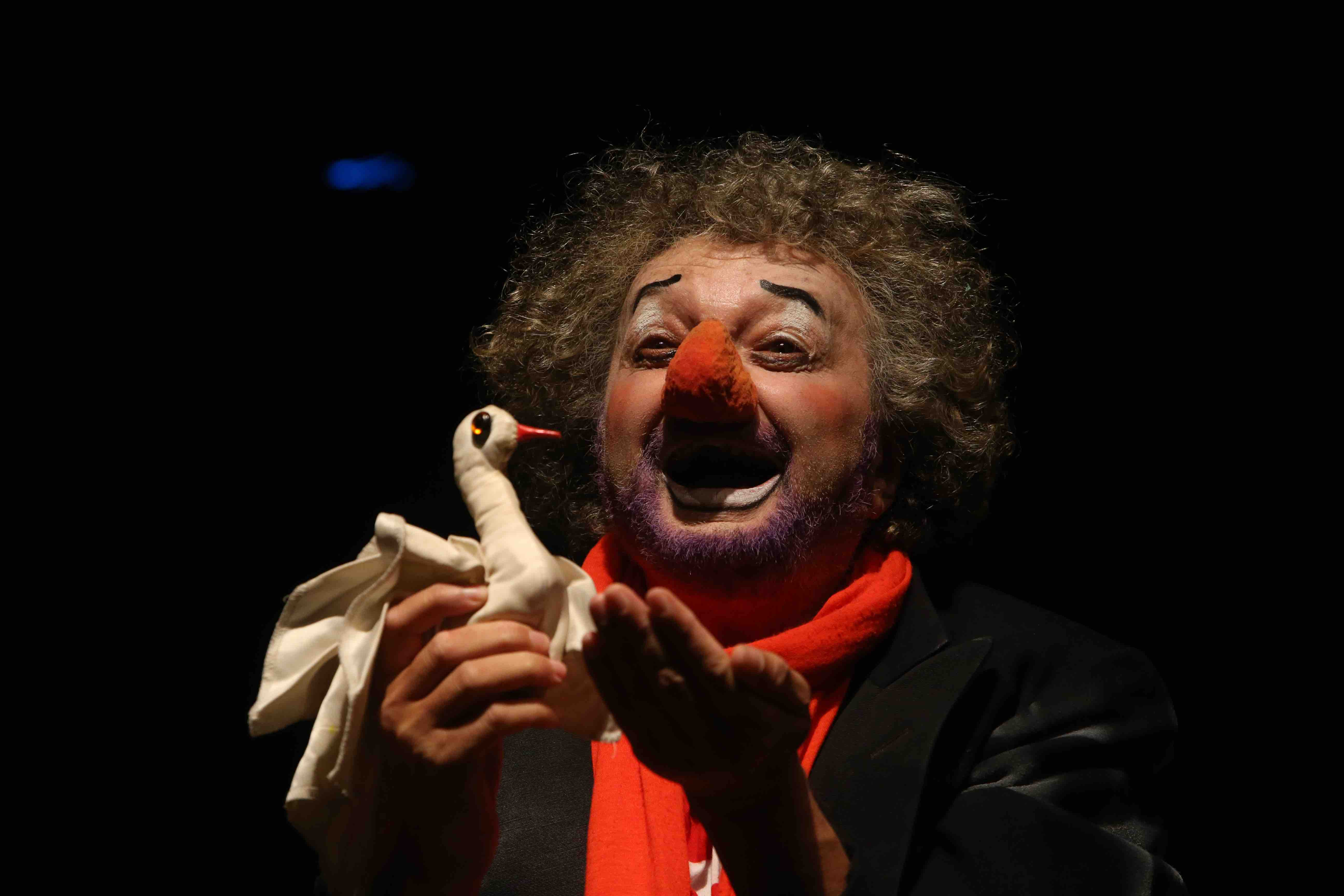
Vladimir Olshansky in "The Laughter" (the pigeon)

In the 1980s, Olshansky moves to New York and gets attracted by the possibilities to use his talent, for those, who are in real need of a smile and laughter - sick children. He enters into the team of Michael Christensen's Clown Care Unit of the Big Apple Circus of New York. Its opens for him, as well, a new horizons for his own work at the clown-theatre and helps to develop his Method of training, his own philosophy, as an actor-clown and director. He creates Actor-Clown Master Class, and introduces it for the first time to the University of North Carolina, United States. He also appears with his actor-clown show "How is it going?" at La MaMa Experimental Theatre Club (La MaMa E.T.C.) of New York, His work with Cirque du Soleil's "Alegria" starts in the year 2000, when Vladimir signs on as a clown and guest actor. He works with the Cirque throughout their Australian and New Zealand tours, and then, in 2004, after a break from touring, continues his relationship with the Cirque in New York, Philadelphia and Toronto.

=== New horizons ===
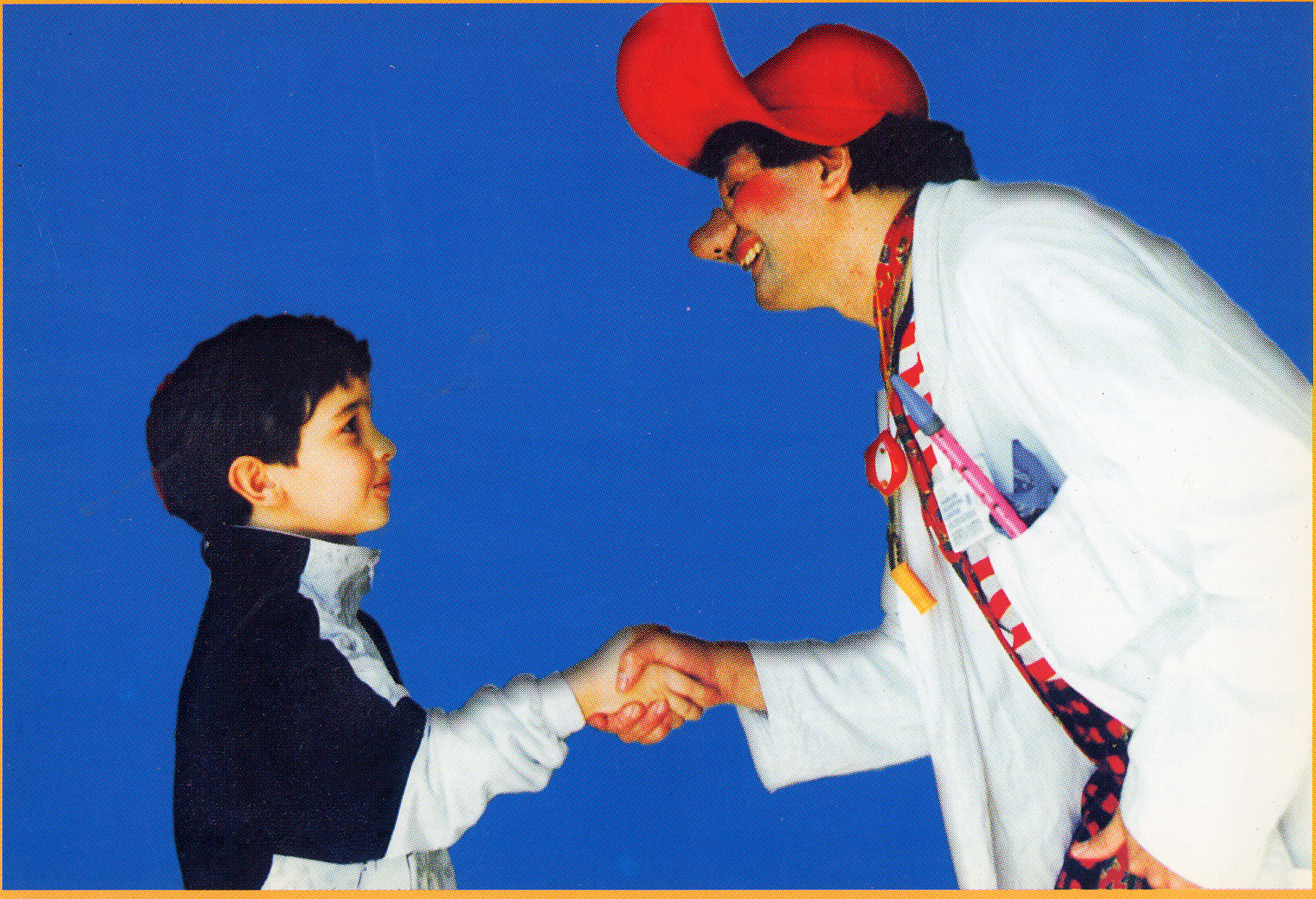
Vladimir Olshansky (Dr. Bobo) in Meyer Children's Hospital, Florence, Italy, photo by Y. Olshansky

In 1996, Vladimir, with brother Yury, actor and film-maker and Caterina Turi Bicocchi, Italian actress and director, founded Soccorso Clown, an Italian non-for-profit, performing arts organization at the service of the Community, and became its artistic director. With his brother, he created the first European Training Project "Clown in Corsia" aimed for the performing artists who would like to become professional Hospital Clowns. The project was recognized and financed by the European Social Fund and supported by the Region of Tuscany, Italian State Theatrical Organization (ETI) Ministry of Labor and the Meyer Children's Hospital (Italian: Ospedale Pediatrico Meyer) of Florence. The birth of this new profession founded a new type of performing arts, aimed to become a part of the hospital life. This kind of assistance promotes the health benefits of laughter and humor to hospitalized children and provides a powerful partner to traditional medical therapy. Following the project "Clown in Corsia", under the supervision of brothers Olshansky, Soccorso Clown introduced the new profession of Hospital Clown into many Italian Children Hospitals: Hospital Marino of Rome; Meyer Children Hospital (present 5 days a week); Careggi of Florence; Policlinic Le Scotte of Siena; ASL 4 Hospital of Prato; Santobono Hospital of Naples; Policlinic of Modena; Hospital (Italian: Casa Sollievo della Sofferenze) of San Giovanni Rotondo in Apulia, Center of the Physically and Mentally Disabled of Manfredonia – annex of the Hospital of Foggia and I Hospital of Cremona. In the autumn of 2007 with Patronage of the Italian Institute of Culture in Moscow and assistance of the Centre for the Lyric Songs of Galina Vishnevskaya, Vladimir and the team of hospital clowns of Soccorso Clown (Luciano Pastori, Tiziana Scrocca, Yury Olshansky, and Caterina Turi) introduced, for the first time in Russia, the professional hospital clown project. The pilot project was presented to the hospitals of Moscow: the Oncology, Center "Blochin"; the "Pediatric Radiology, Centre"; the Center of Endocrinology; the " Neurosurgery Centre " Burdenko ". Under the guidance of Vladimir and his team, during 15 years of its activities, Soccorso Clown received many important awards. In 2010 and 2011, Soccorso Clown visited over 40,000 hospitalized children. Under the guidance of Vladimir and his Soccorso Clown administrative team, Yury Olshansky and Caterina Turi, Soccorso Clown became the founding member of the European Federation of Hospital Clowns Organizations (EFHCO) Presently Vladimir works on two new visual theater shows in Italy and teaches the Actor-Clown Master Class in Italy and all over Europe.

In 2014, together with his brother Yury Olshansky, he was invited to Paris to take part of the Association Art De La Joie and created the Olshansky "Art De La Joiе " Compagnie Théâtrale; he is its Artistic Director. In 2015, during the artistic residence at La Mama Umbria International, Spoleto, Italy, in collaboration with Mibac and Region of Umbria, Italy, he created the new version of the Strange Games show, which he presented at the Cantiere Oberdan in December 2015. In 2016 Vladimir creates the show "OOPS!..." a fascinating journey of the development of the art of comedy, from its roots to the contemporary visual theater. In 2023 Vladimir creates "Strange Games 2.0" show In 2013, Vladimir published the book Путь Клоуна - история смехотерапии (The Path of a Clown - the history of the clown therapy) in Moscow, Russia. and in 2017 "Manuale di clownterapia", Rome, Italy Edizione Dino Audino

== Awards ==
- Franco Enriquez Award, Italy
- City of Rome Award for 10 years of excellent service, Italy
- Circus Award, Sanremo, Italy
- Award for Excellent and Outstanding service by President of the Italian Republic, Carlo Azeglio Ciampi
- Special blessing and appreciation from Pope John Paul II,
- Michelangelo Award by Meyer Hospital and "Noi per Voi" Association of Parents against Leukemia and Infant Tumors,
- Raoul Wallenberg, Humanitarian Award, New York, United States

== Articles ==
- _Articles "Strange Games" Corriere Della Sera 4/10/ 2007 Italy
- "Il clown degli ospedali e grandi anche in teatro" La Republica 26/11/2007 Italy
- Corriere di Firenze 26/11/2007 Italy
- "Ecco Vladimir Olshansky:la vita depinta di humour" La Republica 3/10/2007 Italy
- °Poeticamente clown" Vespertilia 4/10-11/2007 Italy
- Il Manifesto 28/11/2007 Italy
- La Nazione "Vladimir Olshansky, commedia metafisica" 27/11/2007 Italy
- Liberazione 6/10 2007 Italy
- Palcoscenico 24/09/2007 "Una comedia metafisica tra poesie e sogno…" Italy
- La Republica 23/12/2008 "Noi giochiamo con Becket"
- [...] utterly bizarre and utterly playful... successful mix of tragedy and comedy.' Helen Ralston Three Weeks, UK, 08/2006
- [...] genuinely funny...it provokes a fairly constant trickle of laughter from its audience' Chris Wilkinson The Scotsman, UK, 08/2006
- [...] Vladimir is an extremely accomplished artist...it turns out to be a moving journey.' The Herald UK, 08/2006
- [...] Vladimir Olshansky is an impressive and endearing clown.' Pippa Tennant Edinburgh Guide, UK, 08/2006
- [...] Very enjoyable and highly artistic performance of the three clowns... very impressed audience could not get enough...– a long applause awarded the clowns for a very fascinating and extraordinary performance; Praise to Vladimir Olshansky and his two colleagues!

Ann-Kathrin Soder Arena Spots Erlangen, Germany 2/06/07

- La Provence 17/07/08 France
- "Rire et pleure ou Philosophie de Vlad's" La Marseillaise 28/07/08, France
- laRepúblicaCultural.es 25 /03/ 2011 "un clown casi tan absurdo como la vida real"

== Other articles ==
- Toscana Oggi 28/01/2009
- Corriere di Siena 12/6/2000
- Corriere sera 9/6/00 Siena
- La Repubblica 25 ottobre 2000
- Il tempo 25/10/2000
- CITTA' NUOVA 1999
- Messaggero 25/10/2000
- Panorama 23/3/00
- STARBENE maggio 1999
- Tirreno 7/12/99
- la Nazione 25/12/01
- la Repubblica 5/11/98, 25/11/98, 16/1/99, 17/1/99, 19/2/99,11/3/99, 13/3/99,23/9/99, 25/10/2000
- Venerdì di Repubblica 12/3/99
- Corriere del Lavoro suppl. Corriere della Sera 4/12/98
- Vivimilano suppl. Corriere della Sera 24/3/99
- L'Unità 5/11/98, 24/11/98, 25/11/98, 19/2/99, 12/3/99, 13/3/99, 20/3/99, 6/6/99, 23/9/99
- La Nazione 5/11/98, 17/1/99, 23/1/99, 11/3/99, 13/3/99, 20/3/99, 23/9/99
- Salute di Repubblica 20/5/99, 24/2/2000
- Corriere della Sera 5/11/98, 13/3/99, 25/10/2000

== Bibliography ==
- Arnaud A. Francois Delsarte, ses decouvertes en esthetique. Paris, 1882.
- Aubert Ch. Pantomimes modernes. Paris, S.d.
- Broadbent R. A History of pantomime: Reissued. N.Y.: Blom, 1965.
- Bourquin D. Schweizer mimen. Nidau, 1975.
- Campardon E. Les spectacles de la foire. Paris, 1877.
- Champfleury. Pantomimes de Gaspard et Jean-Charles Deburau. Paris, 1889.
- Cluzel M. Mimes et poetes antiques. Paris: Du Scorpion, 1957.
- Gotz Arnold. Bogners clown theater "sisyphos". Frankfurt am Main: Nold, 1991.
- Deburau, Gaspard and Charles. Pantomimes de Gaspard et Charles Deburau. Traduction par M. Emile Goby. Paris, France: Libraire de la Societe' des Gens de Lettres, 1889.
- Decroux E. O sztuce mimu. Warszawa: Panstwowy institute wudawniczy, 1967.
- Disher M. W. Clowns and Pantomimes. N.Y. – Lnd. 1968.
- Doat J. L`expression corporelle du comedien. Grenoble, 1944.
- Fajikura, Takeo and Yoshiko. Kanjiyama Mime. Oshaberina Pantomime. Tokyo, Japan: Ohtsuki Shoten Publisher, 1994.
- Findlater R. Joe Grimaldi, His Life and Theatre.
- Grock. Life's a Lark. Translated by Marge Pemberton. Edited by Eduard Behrens. New York/London: Benjamin Blom, 1931 and 1969.
- Graham M. The Evolution of Her Dance Theory and Training 1926-1991. Chicago, 1991.
- Leabhart, Thomas. Modern and Post-Modern Mime. New York. St. Martin Press, Inc., 1989.
- Markova E. Off Nevsky Prospekt. St Petersburg's theatre studios in the 1980s and 1990s. London, 1998.
- Savukynaite E. Lietuvos pantomima 1967-1972 metais. Klaipeda, 2001.
- From the Greek mimes to Marcel Marceau and beyond : mimes, actors, Pierrots, and clowns : a chronicle Lust, Annette. Lanham, Md. : Scarecrow Press, c2003.
