= Russian bar =

Circus apparatus

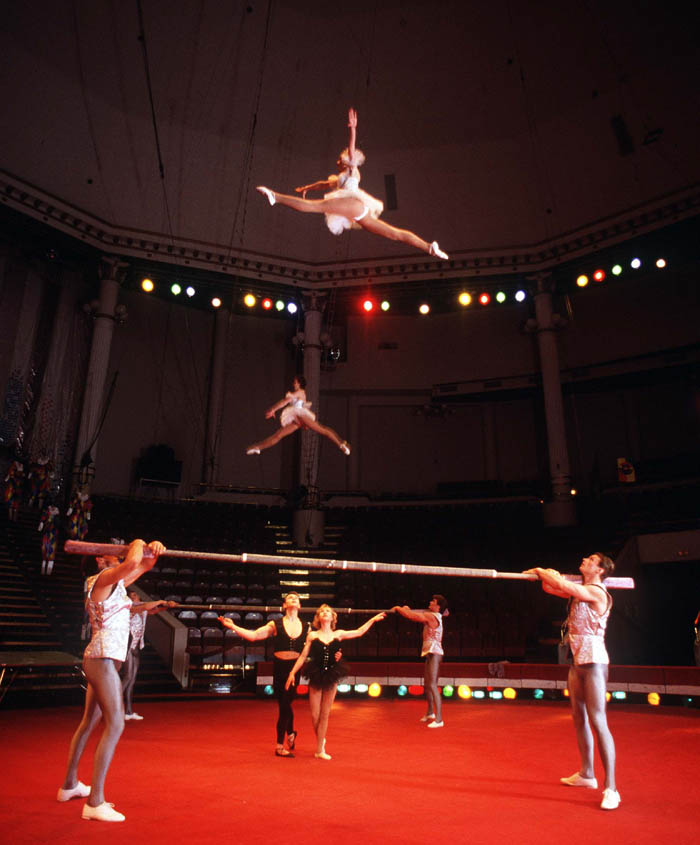
An act created by Russian artistic director Valentin Gneushev

The Russian bar (or Russian barre) is a circus act which combines the gymnastic skills of the balance beam, the rebound tempo skills of trampoline, and the swing handstand skills of the uneven bars and the parallel bars. The bar itself is a flexible vaulting pole around 4 to 4.5 metres (13 to 15 ft) long, typically made of fiberglass; three vaulting poles may also be fastened together to create a flexible beam. The act involves two bases balancing the bar on their shoulders, and one flyer standing on the bar, with the flyer bouncing and performing aerial tricks and landing on the bar.

This genre of circus act was first created by the Russian artist Alexander Moiseev, who brought his act twice to the International Circus Festival of Monte-Carlo, winning the Gold and Silver Clown.

== Technique ==
Two "porters" or bases (bottom people) hold the Russian bar horizontally between them on their shoulders, each supporting one end of the bar; they control the bar and the movements of the "flyer" (top mounter), who stands atop the bar. The flyer prepares for the bar's catapult when the bases give a "ready" signal, and the bases guide the flyer into tempo swings and transitional aerial moves.

For more intricate acrobatic-aerial techniques, two to three poles can be secured together, allowing for a higher lift and resulting in more airtime. At the present heights, aerial skills such as "full-in, full-out" (double twisting doubles), trifis (triple twisting somersault), triple sault and "Miller" (triple twisting double) somersaults are possible. There is also an advanced tactic known as the flippy floppy. It has only been landed a few times, but is a quadruple twisting double.

The Russian bar act requires acrobats to be highly skilled in tumbling and to have experience with trampoline and/or sports acrobatics. Performers must collaborate on many levels. The act requires not only physical skill, but psychological and communicative skills as well.

As the flyer is flung high in the air, a good deal of clearance is necessary when performing this acrobatic act.

An act featuring the Russian bar appeared on America's Got Talent and was voted to return.
