= Gerry Cottle =

Circus owner (1945–2021)

- Born: Gerald Ward Cottle; 7 April 1945; Carshalton, Surrey, England
- Died: 13 January 2021 (aged 75); Bath, Somerset, England
- Occupations: Businessman, circus owner, owner of Wookey Hole Caves

Gerald Ward Cottle (7 April 1945 – 13 January 2021) was a British circus owner and the owner of the Wookey Hole Caves in Somerset. He presented the Moscow State Circus and Chinese State Circus in Britain, founded Gerry Cottle's Circus, and co-founded The Circus of Horrors.

== Early life ==
Gerry Cottle was born in Carshalton, Surrey to Reg and Joan Ward Cottle. His father was a stockbroker and grand-master in the Freemasons and his mother was a former air stewardess. Gerry Cottle was educated at Rutlish School, Merton Park, south London.

After seeing Jack Hilton's Circus in Earl's Court when he was eight years old, Gerry was inspired to work in the circus. He learned how to juggle with oranges and sometimes was invited by his father to his Freemasons lodge to entertain the members. For two summers he worked at Chessington Zoo Circus and learned how to ride a unicycle.

== Circus career ==
Cottle left home in 1961 at the age of 16 to join the Robert Brothers Circus. He joined the Robert Brothers Circus in Newcastle, earning £6 a week as an apprentice and by 1968 was a clown called Scats. Cottle started by doing menial tasks, but worked his way up to have his own juggling act, billed as Gerry Melville the Teenage Juggler.

Also in 1970, he met Brian Austen, who worked in the James Brothers Circus. The two formed the Embassy Circus in July 1970 with just five performers; Cottle, Austen, their wives and Austen's brother. They changed their name to Cottie & Austen's Circus however the two went their separate ways in 1974.

After leaving Austen, Gerry established his Big Top in 1974 and ran it until 2003. By the mid-1970s the Gerry Cottle Circus was touring Britain with three shows. The show appeared regularly on the first four series of Seaside Special. He also presented the Moscow State Circus and Chinese State Circus in Britain.

In 1979, the Circus visited Iran for a performance, however the tour started at the same time as the Iranian Revolution, meaning none of the countries citizens were allowed to leave their homes, resulting in the circus going bankrupt: "We never got paid, ran out of money and had to do a midnight flit from our hotel" (Cottle). He worked as a ringmaster for other venues to make up the money and in 1981 returned with his Rainbow Circus. Also in 1981, he started a short-lived attraction, Gary Glitter's Rock 'n' Roll Circus, but audiences for the shows were few and he quietly ended the show after a few performances.

During his time running the circus he set up a mobile school for the performers’ children.

Cottle announced his retirement in 1993. Two Years later, in 1995, he co-created The Circus of Horrors with Doktor Haze which debuted at the Glastonbury Festival and has toured the world since then. This was a collaborative venture with Archaos, a French contemporary circus.

In 2003 he auctioned off much of his circus paraphernalia when he was refused planning permission to expand on his Addlestone Moor quarters, which was the heart of his company. in order to concentrate on running Wookey Hole Caves, a tourist attraction in Somerset. In 2012 he celebrated fifty years in the business with a new show, Turbo Circus: 50 Acts In 100 Minutes, on a 31-week tour. Cottle and his Magic Circus undertook another months-long tour in 2017.

=== Animal acts ===
Gerry Cottle's Circus originally toured with a variety of animals including horses, zebras, elephants, lions, tigers, monkeys, and llamas. In 1976, one of Cottle's elephants, Vicki, appeared on series 4 episode 5 of It Ain't Half Hot Mum, titled "Lofty's Little Friend", in which Gunner Lofty (played by Don Estelle) meets the elephant and it follows him back to camp. The 1980s saw an increase in public opinion against animal acts. Cottle sold his last elephant and by the end of 1993 had a non-animal circus. In 2012 he said that he now reluctantly supports the ban on circus animal acts, which he says will improve the image of circuses in Britain.

=== Wookey Hole ===
After purchasing Wookey Hole Caves, a tourist attraction that featured show caves, penny arcades and restaurants, he added a theatre, circus museum, hotel and circus school. At the latter, local youth were trained in a wide range of circus skills, and performed at the theatre and in Cottle's touring show Turbo Circus.

In 2005, a Dalek prop in the attraction went missing, and a ransom note was left behind. The prop was then returned after it was discovered in Glastonbury Tor, this was considered a publicity stunt at first, however Cottle denied this in interviews. In August 2006, it was reported that a security dog had ripped apart certain valuable teddy bears on display, including one once owned by Elvis Presley, this however was in fact a publicity stunt, which Gerry admitted to.

== Personal life ==
He married Betty Fossett, youngest daughter of circus showman Jim Fossett, in 1968. The couple had three daughters, Sarah, April and Polly and a son, Gerry. He was separated from Betty and had another partner, Anna Carter of Carters Steam Fair, who he would also separate from. During his first marriage, Cottle left Betty to focus on work only to move back into her caravan less than a year later. He had several grandchildren and great-grandchildren.

In the 1980s he became addicted to cocaine and was jailed and also fined £500 in 1992; he claimed "work stress" caused his addiction. His daughters set up Cottle Sisters Circus.

In 1975 he purchased an unimproved plot in Surrey for £40,000 and lived there for 30 years, eventually selling it for £3 million.

Cottle was the guest for BBC Radio 4's Desert Island Discs on 15 September 1984. His choices included the "Radetzky March" by Johann Strauss Sr., and Help! by the Beatles. His favourite was "American Pie" by Don McLean.

== Death ==
Cottle died in hospital in Bath, Somerset, in January 2021, aged 75, after contracting COVID-19 during the COVID-19 pandemic in the United Kingdom.

== Filmography ==
Year	Title	Role	Notes
1975	Going a Bundle	Himself	One episode
1976	The Generation Game	Himself	Guest judge/one episode
1977—1994	Pebble Mill at One	Himself	Two episodes
1981	Forty Minutes	Himself	One episode
1985	Wogan	Himself	One episode
1987	Christmas Morning with Noel	Himself	One episode
1994	This Is Your Life	Himself	One episode/episode dedicated to Jeremy Beadle
1997	Esther	Himself	One episode
2001	Trouble at the Top	Himself	One episode
2011	Timeshift	Himself	One episode
2011	Salvage Hunters	Himself	One episode
2018	The Big Audition	Himself	One episode

=== Additional ===
Year	Title	Notes
1976	It Ain't Half Hot Mum	One episode of the show featured an elephant owned by Cottle, Vicki, who is credited as "Vicki from Gerry Cottle's Circus"
