= Doktor Haze =

British circus owner (1956–2023)

- Born: John Hayes Mabley; 22 December 1956; Preston, Lancashire, England
- Died: 15 April 2023 (aged 66)
- Other names: Dr. Haze, John Haze
- Occupations: Circus owner; circus performer; singer-songwriter; director; author
- Years active: 1970–2023
- Known for: The Circus of Horrors
- Musical career
- Genres: Psychedelic rock; classic rock; hard rock
- Labels: Madman Records
- Formerly of: Flash Harry; Haze Vs The X Factor; Dr Haze & The Circus of Horrors; Dr Haze and the Interceptors from Hell
- Website: www.circusofhorrors.co.uk

John Hayes Mabley (22 December 1956 – 15 April 2023), better known by his stage name Doktor Haze, was a British circus owner and performer, singer-songwriter, director, and author. He was the owner, ringmaster and director of The Circus of Horrors, in which he co-founded with Gerry Cottle in 1995, which has become Britain's longest-running alternative circus.

== Life and career ==
John Hayes Mabley was born on 22 December 1956 in Preston, Lancashire. His parents were circus performers and travelled with the Winship Circus in Scotland when he was a new born. At age 12, he performed with his father as a fire eater for a circus in Ireland. At age 16, he learned to play the guitar and began songwriting, influenced by T. Rex and Marc Bolan.

In the late 1970s, Haze formed his first rock band Flash Harry, which toured with Depeche Mode. Then during the 1980s and 1990s, he performed with his band Haze Vs The X Factor, which incorporated stage illusions and elements of circus and horror into their performances. They often performed at Marquee Club in London and Haze created the title "Circus of Horrors" for one of their acts.

In 1994, Haze met circus owner Gerry Cottle at a funeral and discussed ideas for a new brand of circus. With help from Cottle and Archaos’ creator Pierrot Bidon, Haze created The Circus of Horrors which debuted at the Glastonbury Festival in the summer of 1995. The Circus of Horrors was a blend of circus, cabaret and horror, all performed to Haze’s original rock score. With The Circus of Horrors, Haze gained Guinness World Records, appeared on various television shows including Britain's Got Talent, and performed all over the world and at numerous festivals. He was the ringmaster of The Circus of Horrors until 2021.

In 2011, Haze released his autobiography book Dr Haze: Mud, Blood and Glitter. He was the company director for Moscow State Circus, Carters Steam Fair and Psycho Management, and was also the co-owner of Circus Extreme, Circus Ukraine, and Continental Circus Berlin. In 2017, he stood as an independent candidate for Brighton Kemptown.

Haze died from oesophageal cancer on 15 April 2023, at the age of 66.

== Discography ==
- The Web (Haze Vs The X Factor) (1996)
- Welcome to The Freakshow (Haze Vs The X Factor) (2001)
- Destiny And Desire, My Enchantment With Fire (Haze Vs The X Factor) (2002)
- An Evil Anthology (Dr Haze & The Circus of Horrors) (2006)
- Destiny & Desire (Dr Haze & The Circus of Horrors) (2008)
- Something Wicked This Way Comes (Dr Haze & The Interceptors From Hell) (2016)

== Bibliography ==
- Haze, John (2011). Dr Haze: Mud, Blood and Glitter. United Kingdom. ISBN 9780957069909.
