= Bob Gandey =

British showman (1894–1952)

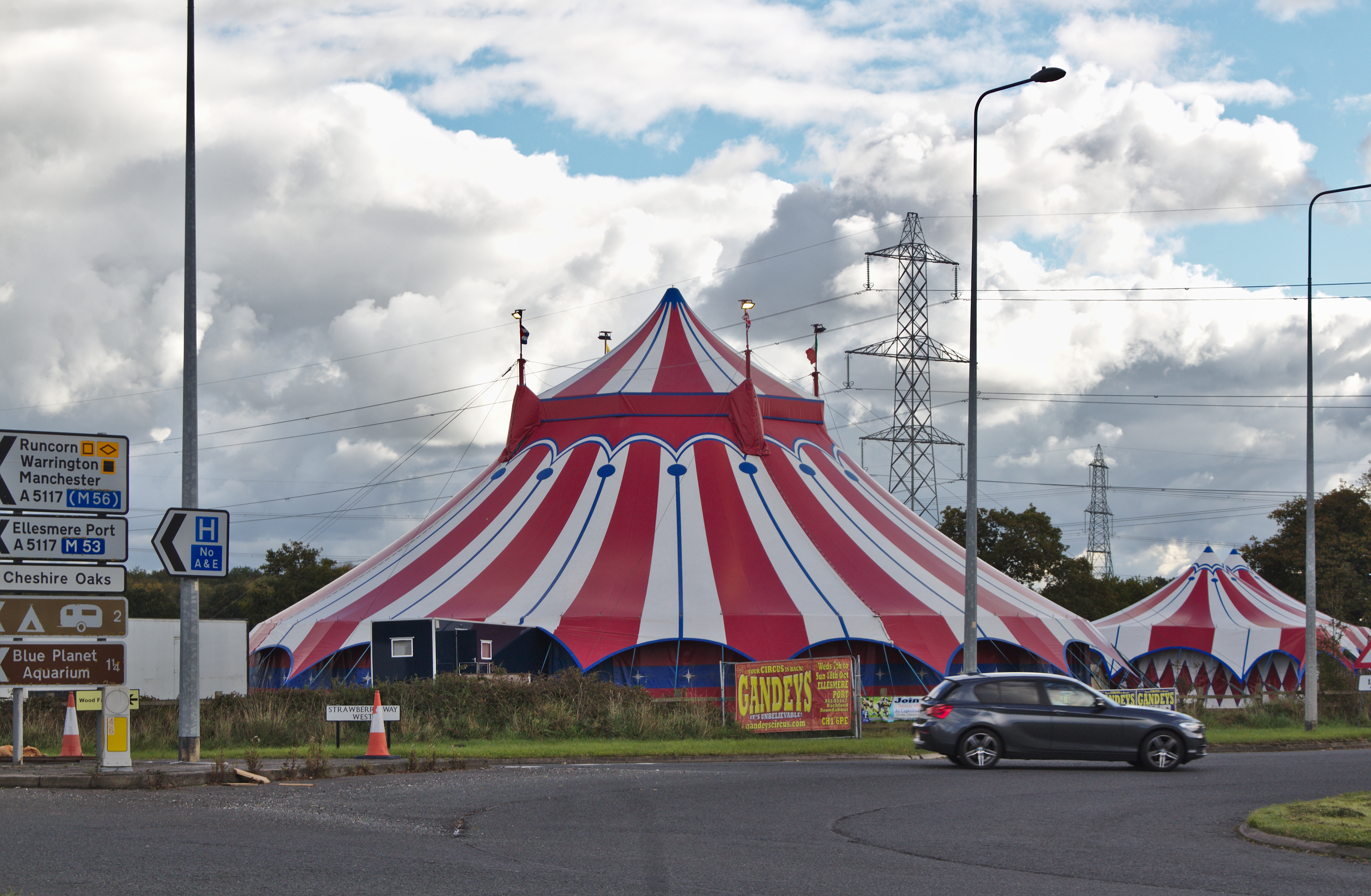
Gandey's circus in 2020

Robert Gandey (1894–1952) was a British showman who founded Gandey's Circus, which continues to perform in Britain. His parents were also showmen and he followed them into the trade, training performing ponies from the age of nine. Gandey had become a performer in the Buffalo Bill Wild West show by the age of 15 and by 1918 operated his own circus tent. From 1943 he began touring Gandey's Circus as an independent big-top show.

== Biography ==
A 1926 newspaper advertisement for a William Henry Broadhead show that includes Gandey's Comedy Circus

Gandey was born in 1894. His parents had performed in circus from the late 19th century in Wild West acts with Frank C. Bostock's Circus and the Buffalo Bill travelling show. Bob followed his parents into the trade, working with Lord George Sanger's circus from the age of nine as a pony trainer. By the age of 15 he was a talented horse rider and performed in the Buffalo Bill show. From 1910 to 1920 Gandey presented a comedy show involving mules and ponies; billed as "Robert Gandey", "Arthur Jack" or the "Colorado Kid".

Gandey married fellow performer Rose in 1912 and she joined the family in performing wild west acts in circuses, theatres and music halls and, during the winter, in pantomime. In 1916 the couple had a son, Philip (known as "Joe") who became a circus clown. By 1918 the Gandey family were operating their own circus tent and what is now known as Gandey's Circus dates from this time.

During the 1920s Gandey performed as part of the North Western Troupe of Cowboys of Colorado, toured a show in theatres and presented his Gandey's Comedy Circus. He also trained ponies, mules, geese and sheep for his own shows and also for others including the Blackpool Tower Circus and Tom Arnold's Circus. During the Second World War Gandey's Circus was hired by the British government for 12 weeks as part of a programme to encourage holidays in the country. Gandey's Circus in something resembling its current form as an independent big-top show first toured in 1943, after Gandey decided the theatre circuit was in decline. Gandey died in 1952.

== Legacy ==
Gandey's Circus passed to Joe and then to his son (Bob's grandson) Philip Gandey, who continues to operate the business. The company continues to tour as Gandey's Circus and also operates the Chinese State Circus and Cirque Surreal. The company is based at Congleton, Cheshire. Bob Gandey first settled there after his vehicle broke down while on tour and he took a liking to the area while waiting three weeks for it to be repaired.
