= Biennale Internationale des Arts du Cirque =

French circus festival

The Biennale Internationale des Arts du Cirque is the largest contemporary circus festival in the world, held in the south of France every two years. The event is organised by the Archaos circus company, and the first edition, in 2015, attracted sixty circus companies from around the world and drew more than 85,000 visitors.

== History ==
The Archaos circus company is one of the legendary contemporary circus companies in Europe. Their work in Britain changed the way the circus was seen and the founder of Archaos, Pierrot Bidon, was seen as a circus revolutionary. In Bidon's obituary in The Guardian, Archaos was described as "one of the ensembles that galvanised the new circus movement, in which traditional arts have been re-imagined and combined with contemporary artistic sensibilities and theatrical techniques."

The Biennale itself was born out of the Circus in Capitals project that Archaos managed as part of Marseille-Provence 2013, the European Capital of Culture festivities. The success of the circus arts during the Marseille Provence 2013 inspired the Archaos company to create the first Biennale Internationale des Arts du Cirque in 2015. The first biennale featured circus companies such as Nofit State Circus, Cirque Éloize, and the Chinese State Circus.

The first Biennale was such a success that in 2016 the company created the L'Entre–Deux Biennales to meet public demand and continue to foster the circus arts in years when the Biennale was not being held. Archaos was nominated for the Best Producer award for the L'Entre-Deux Biennales project at the 2016 Annual International Professional Circus Awards in Sochi, Russia that were organised by the Russian Ministry of Culture. Archaos was also chosen to present performances at the Club France that was held during the Rio Olympics in August 2016.

== 2017 Biennale ==
The second edition of the Biennale ran from January 21 to February 19, 2017. It featured more than 260 performances in close to 30 cities in the south of France including Marseille, Aix-en-Provence, Grasse, and Gap. The 2017 Biennale included new work from leading British companies NoFit State Circus and Motionhouse, the Swedish company Cirkus Cirkör, and the Brazilian company Borogodo. More than 120,000 people attended events.

== 2019 Biennale ==
The third edition of the Biennale ran from January 11 to February 10, 2019. More than 110,000 people attended 67 different shows. Newspapers in France such as Les Echos and Le Monde called it the circus equivalent of the Festival d'Avignon.
