= Chinese variety art =

Demonstrations of physical skill as entertainment

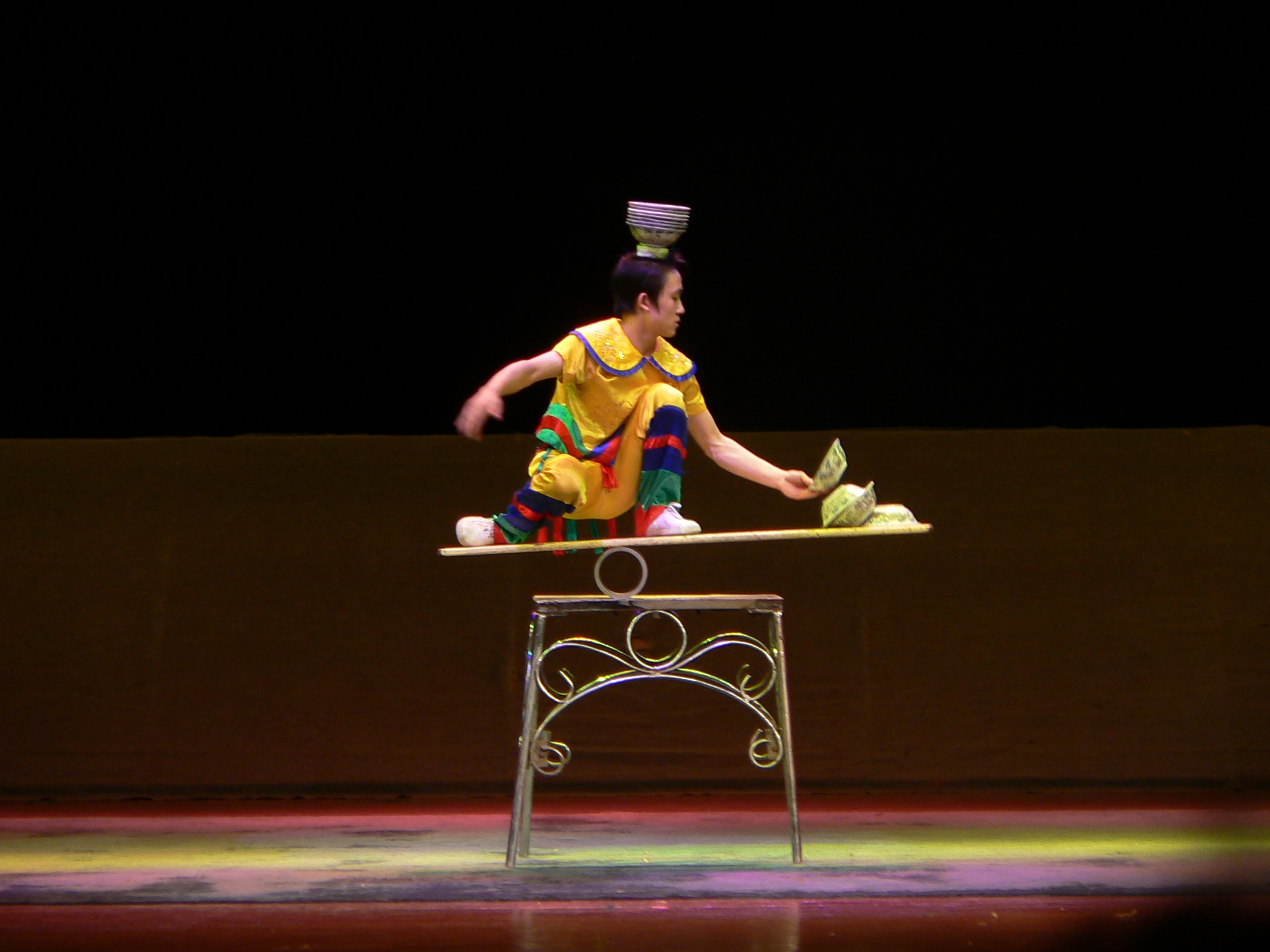
Balancing acts are one type of Chinese variety art.

Chinese variety art (simplified Chinese: 杂技艺术; traditional Chinese: 雜技藝術; pinyin: zá jì yì shù) is a wide range of acrobatic acts, balancing acts and other demonstrations of physical skill traditionally performed by a troupe in China. Many of these acts have a long history in China and are still performed today.

== Circus vs variety art ==
While the English term "Chinese circus" has been used to describe Chinese variety arts even in the earliest Western historical texts, the East views the Chinese term "circus" (馬戲) as an altogether separate, Western style of show. Elements such as clowns and large animals belong exclusively to the Western circus. Eastern elements include Shaolin monks, Peking opera characters and the Monkey King, for example.

== History ==
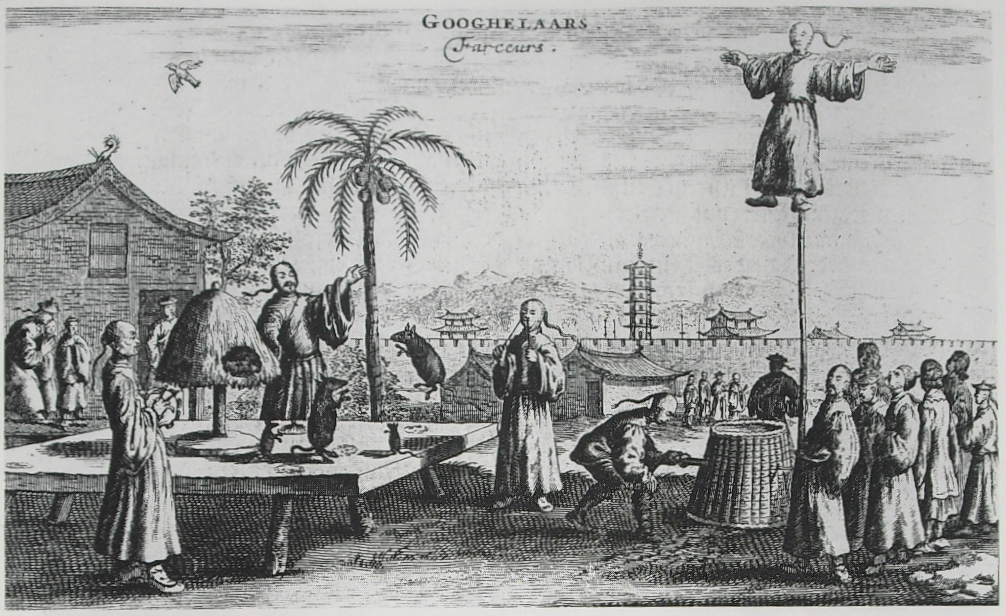
Chinese street performers seen by Johan Nieuhof in 1655–57

Chinese performing arts have a long history. Variety show is known to existed as early as the Qin dynasty (221–207 BC) or possibly earlier. During the Qin and Han periods, Juedi (角抵) or Baixi (百戲) variety show was popular with the common people. Juedi was originally an entertainment where men wearing horns charged at one another like bulls, but became a general term used interchangeably with Baixi to describe popular entertainment during the Han dynasty. It consisted of a variety of acts such as conjuring, acrobatics, wrestling, musical performances, dance, martial arts, horsemanship, and juggling. In the Eastern Han dynasty, the scholar Zhang Heng was one of the first to describe the acrobatic theme shows in the royal palaces in his "Ode to the Western Capital" (西京賦). The event featured shows such as Old Man Huang of the Eastern Sea (東海黃公), the Dancing Fish and Dragon (魚龍蔓衍) and Assembly of Immortals (總會仙倡), and Zheng described swallowing knives and spitting fire, creatures that transformed into another, as well as children who performed acrobatics on high poles. A grand acrobatic show was held by Emperor Wu of Han in 108 BC for foreign guests.

The performances became more elaborate and during the Tang dynasty (618–907 AD), the performing arts became popular in the emperor's court, and the acts became more refined. Eventually, the performing arts lost favor in the Imperial Court; they moved back to the common people and most performers performed in the street. During the Song dynasty the variety shows may be performed in the entertainment centres called the wazi (瓦子, meaning "tiles"). Towards the end of the Ming dynasty (1368–1644), the performers came off the street and started performing on stage. During the end of the Qing dynasty (1644–1911), it regained popularity with the Imperial Court and has remained a popular art form to this day.

Since the founding of the People's Republic of China in 1949, the art forms have gained new respectability. Troupes have been established in the provinces, autonomous regions, and special municipals with theaters specifically dedicated to the variety arts. Some troupes have become world famous, playing to packed houses at home and on foreign tours.

It wasn't until the 1990s, however, that the art form was packaged as a complete theme show. The 1994 show Golden Wind of the Southwest (金色西南風) led the way in successfully re-promoting the art as a whole.

== Performances ==
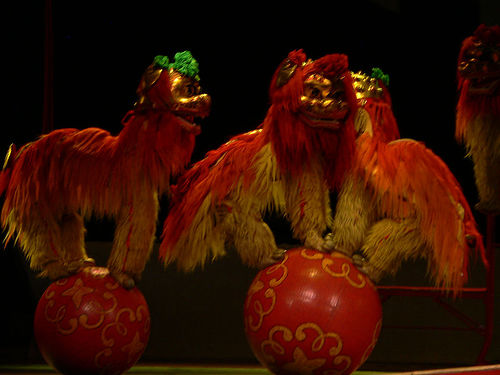
Human Lion balancing on a globe. Each lion suit usually has two performers.

Below is a list of performances available in the variety art. Some are more standard, while others are more regional. There is always new innovation taking place.

- Lion dance on top of rolling globes or balls
- Tightrope walking
- Contortion acrobatics
- Balancing act while playing Chinese yo-yo
- Shaolin monks resisting projectiles
- Extreme kung fu demonstrations
- Unicycling and bowl balancing
- Multi-plate spinning
- Tricks involving smaller animals
- Fire breathing
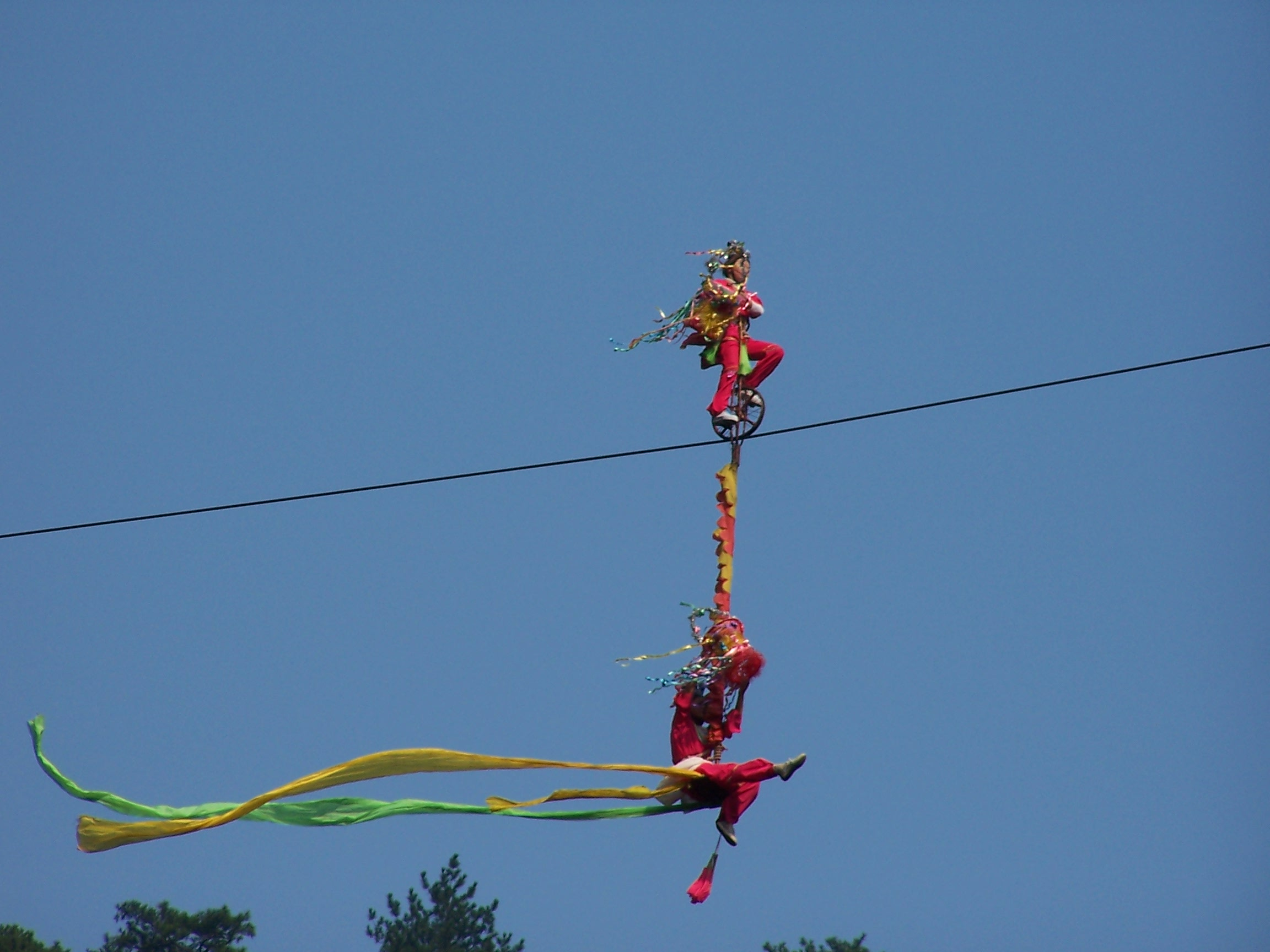
Highwire acrobats in Huang Shan

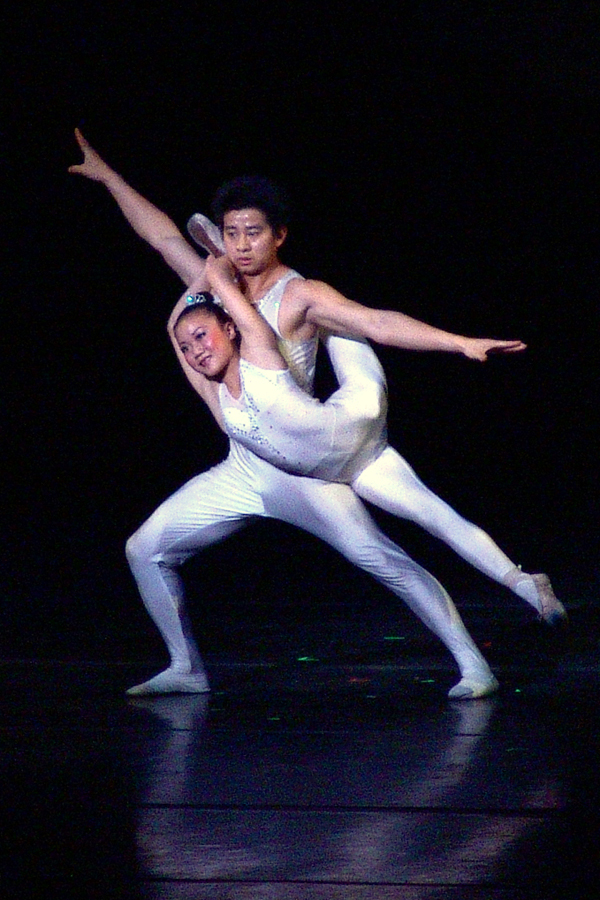
Contortion acrobatics

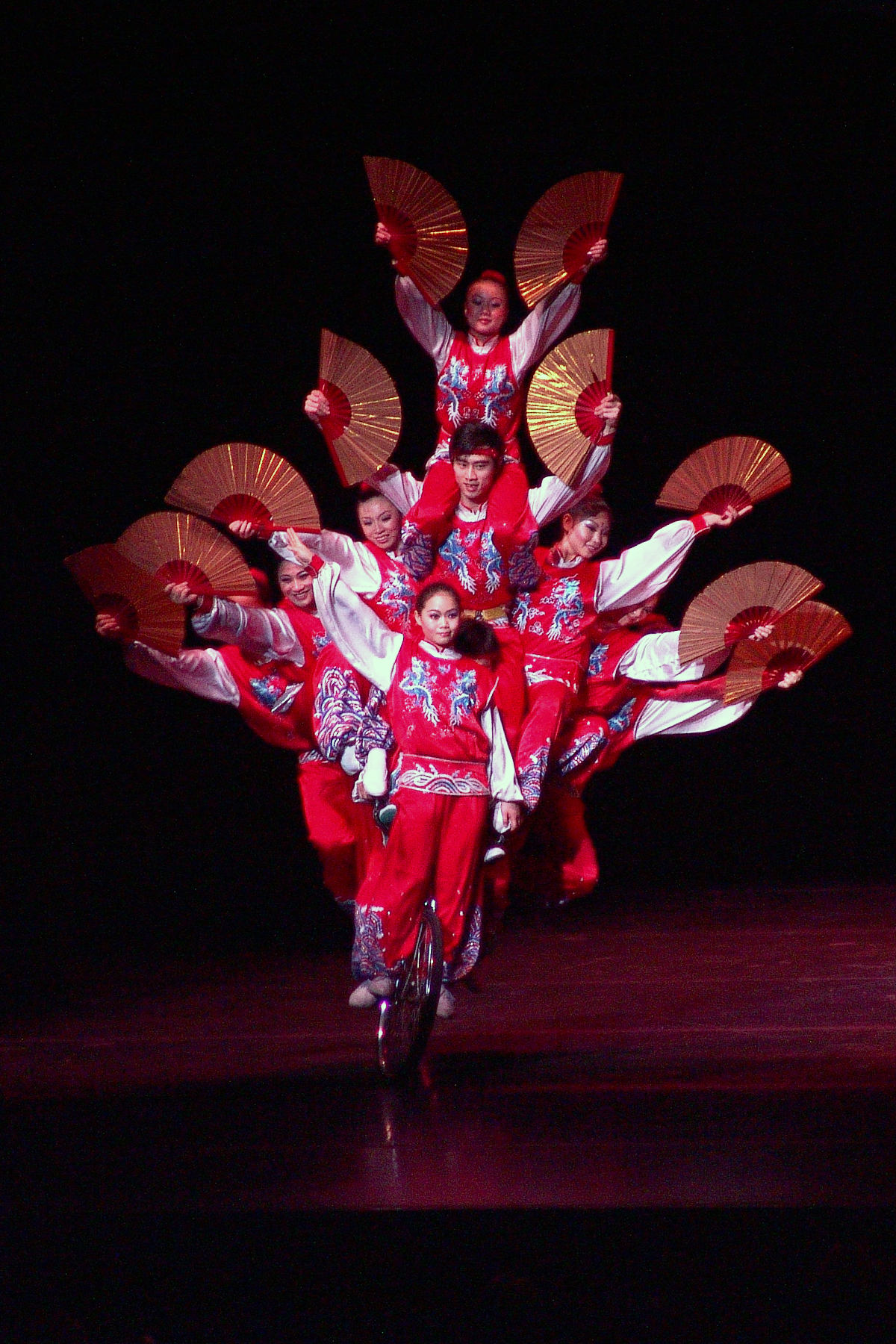
Balancing act on a bicycle

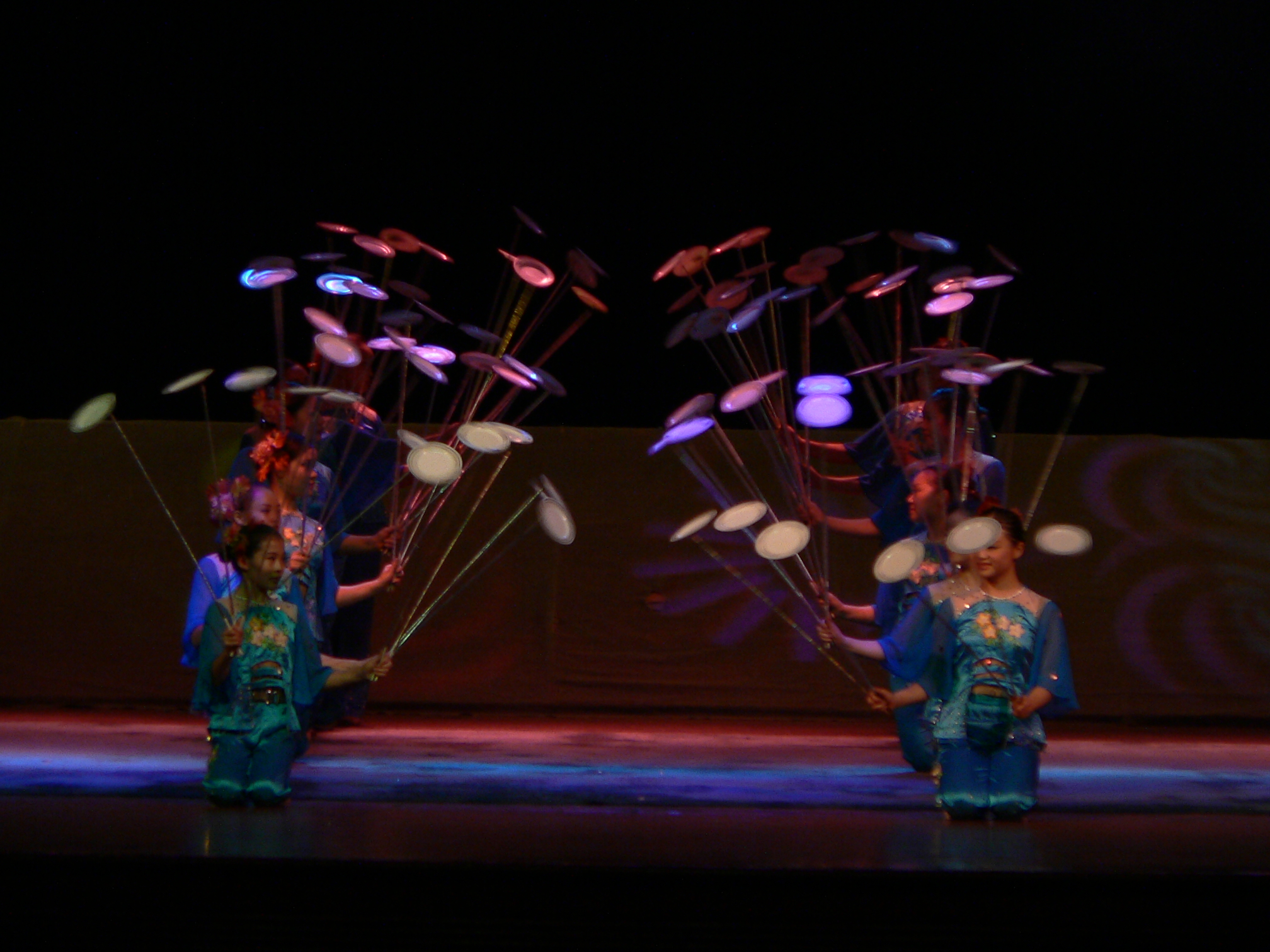
Multi-plate spinning

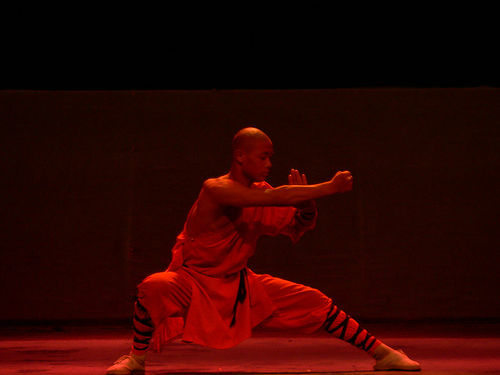
Shaolin monk

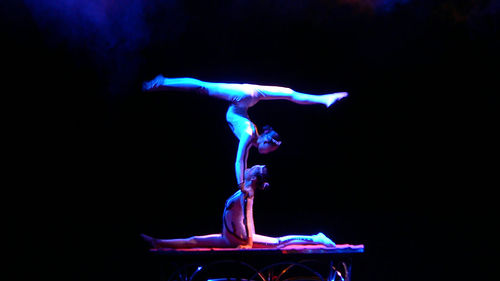
Gymnastic display

== Festivals ==
- Shanghai Circus World

== See also ==
- Chinese State Circus
- Chinese art
- Culture of China
- Balancing Acts – a documentary about acrobat Man Fan Tong
