= New York Circus Arts Academy =

- (United States) New York, NY

Information
- Type: Private circus school
- Established: 2002 or 2003
- Campus: Urban

The New York Circus Arts Academy was the educational division of New York Circus Arts. The school taught aerial acrobatic tricks and the flying trapeze, as well as juggling, stiltwalking and unicycling.

Founded in 2002 or 2003 by contemporary circus enthusiast Cypher Zero, the Academy featured faculty members formerly of the Moscow State Circus, Cirque du Soleil, the Israeli National Circus School, and FireFly Aerial Acrobatics.
