= The Circus of Horrors =

British contemporary circus

Origin
- Country: United Kingdom
- Founder(s): John Haze, Gerry Cottle
- Year founded: 1995
- Defunct: 2024

Information
- Ringmaster(s): Doktor Haze
- Directors: John Haze, Anastasia Sawicka
- Other information: No animals

The Circus of Horrors was a British-based contemporary circus created by John 'Doktor' Haze and Gerry Cottle. They were first seen performing at the Glastonbury Festival in 1995. Blending horror, black comedy and rock music with circus acts, it used goth and steampunk imagery, and referenced Victorian freak shows and burlesque. They were semi-finalists on Britain's Got Talent in 2011.

Following the death of ringmaster and founder Doktor Haze, The Circus of Horrors announced it had closed in September 2024, after a tribute show toured in Haze's honour.

== Background ==
The Circus of Horrors was created by John Haze and Gerry Cottle and debuted at the 1995 Glastonbury Festival. Influences included Alice Cooper, Marc Bolan, Rob Zombie, Jim Rose Circus, and Archaos.

The Circus of Horrors performed at various festivals, including Glastonbury Festival (three times), Download Festival (four times), Reading and Leeds Festivals, T in the Park, Edinburgh Fringe, Beautiful Days, Isle of Wight Festival, Tartan Heart Festival in the United Kingdom, Fuji Rock Festival in Japan (twice), Wacken Festival in Germany, plus shows in the United States, Chile, Uruguay, the Netherlands, Belgium (twice), Argentina, France, Italy, Ireland, Hong Kong, Poland, Jersey, and Moscow where it created history by becoming the first British circus ever to perform in Russia. They annually performed at The Great Dorset Steam Fair and Shocktober Fest, and toured theatres across the UK.

Notable acts included Ringmaster Doktor Haze, Hannibal Hellmurto, Anastasia IV, Captain Dan, Gary Stretch, The Mongolian Laughing Boy, Camp Dracula, The Sinister Sisters, The Deadly Divas, and The Voodoo Warriors. They also performed with many stars and celebrities including Alice Cooper, Gary Numan, Marilyn Manson, Boy George, Cradle of Filth, Lenny Henry, Dani Behr, Gary Lineker, Robbie Williams, Yvette Fielding, Arthur Brown, Ant & Dec, Screaming Lord Sutch, Jeremy Beadle, and The Damned.

The Circus of Horrors hold numerous Guinness World Records, including the world's largest custard pie fight, most swords swallowed in one minute, 1040 vampires in the same place at the same time, greatest weight lifted by the hair, most naked rollercoaster riders, and the largest human mobile which contained 16 men, including Dr Haze, suspended from a crane 150ft above the River Thames.

In 2011, The Circus of Horrors appeared on the fifth series of Britain's Got Talent and became the only circus act to ever reach the finals of the show. They were the first circus to perform in London's West End in over 100 years and were the only circus to perform in a single venue in London (the Roundhouse) for 24 weeks, (previous record was 17 weeks).

The ringmaster and founder Doktor Haze died on 15 April 2023, after battling oesophageal cancer for a year. Not long after his death, The Circus of Horrors announced it had now closed, after a tribute show toured in Haze's honour.

== Tours ==
- Welcome to the Freakshow (2001)
- The Nightmare Returns (2003–2004)
- 10th Anniversary Tour (2004–2005)
- Undead & Alive (2005–2006)
- Evilution (2006–2007)
- The Asylum (2007–2008)
- The Apocalypse in the Asylum (2008–2009)
- The Day of the Dead (2009–2010)
- 4 Chapters From Hell (2010–2011)
- The Ventriloquist (2011–2012)
- London After Midnight (2013–2014)
- The Night of the Zombie (2014–2015)
- Welcome to Carnevil (2015–2016)
- The Never-ending Nightmare (2016–2017)
- Voodoo (2017–2018)
- Psycho Asylum (2018–2019)
- 25th Anniversary Tour (2019–2020)
- Revamped & Rocking (2020–2021)
- The Witch (2022)
- Haunted Fairground (2023)
- Dr Hazes Cabaret of Curiosities (2024)

== Filmography ==
=== Music video credits ===
- Cradle of Filth – "Born in a Burial Gown" (2001)

=== Television credits ===
- Dani Dares (1997)
- The Jerry Springer Show (1998)
- Royal Command Variety Performance (1998)
- London's Burning (1999)
- Don't Try This at Home (1999–2001)
- Record Breakers (2001)
- So Graham Norton (2002)
- Richard & Judy (2003)
- Ant & Dec's Saturday Night Takeaway (2003)
- Get Your Act Together with Harvey Goldsmith (2007)
- This Morning (2008)
- Bizarre ER (2008)
- Ross Lee's Ghoulies (2009)
- Guinness World Records Smashed (2009)
- The Slammer (2010)
- Britain's Got Talent (2011)
- Daybreak (2011)
- Fairground Attractions (2011)
- Das Supertalent (2012)
- Fake Reaction (2013)
- Operation Ouch! (2013)
- The One Show (2014)
- Bodyshockers (2015)
- The Nolan Show (2016)
- Judge Rinder (2018)
- The Wright Stuff (2018)
- Apocalypse Wow (2021)
