= Machine de cirque =

Canadian circus company in Quebec

Machine de cirque is a contemporary circus company based in Quebec City, Canada. It was founded in 2013 by Vincent Dubé, Ugo Dario, Raphaël Dubé, Maxim Laurin, Frédéric Lebrasseur, and Yohann Trépanier. The company produces contemporary circus shows that are presented in Canada and internationally.

== History ==
Since 2015, the company has performed more than 2,000 times in 21 countries across America, Europe, and Asia, reaching over one million spectators.

== Main productions ==
- Machine de Cirque (2015): The company’s first production, still touring internationally.
- Truck Stop: The Great Journey (2018): A performance inspired by a road trip across North America, presented in various outdoor venues.
- La Galerie (2019): The company’s third production, which takes audiences to the boundaries of art.
- Fleuve (2020): An in-situ creation presented at Baie de Beauport in Quebec City, during the COVID-19 pandemic.
- Ghost Light: Between Fall and Flight (2020): Premiered at the Festival du cirque actuel CIRCA in Auch, France.
- Errances - 1916 : Le deuxième brasier (2021): A site-specific performance created in the Saint-Charles Church in Limoilou.
- Les 3 Géants (2022): Presented at the festival Montréal Complètement Cirque.
- Changes (2022): A show created in collaboration with GOP Varieté-Theater in Germany, presented over three years.
- Robot Infidèle (2023): A performance combining circus arts and object theatre, premiered at the Royal Festival in Spa, Belgium.
- Grand-Mess’ (2024)11: Grand-Mess’ was presented at the Saint-Charles Church in Limoilou, for which and within which it was created. Machine de Cirque has been based at this location since 2021, where it also initiated the development of Manivelle, a centre for artistic creation and dissemination.
- Kintsugi (2024): A poetic performance featuring nine circus disciplines, premiered in July 2024.

== Awards and recognition ==
- 2016: Guinness World Record for the most consecutive backflips on a teeterboard by a duo (101), achieved by Maxim Laurin and Ugo Dario.
- 2017: International Outreach Award from the Conseil de la culture des régions de Québec et Chaudière-Appalaches, awarded to Vincent Dubé, general manager of Machine de Cirque.
- 2019: Ville de Québec Award for its 2018–2019 season.
- 2020: Young Entrepreneur of Quebec Award presented to Vincent Dubé as part of the ARISTA Provincial Competition organized by the Junior Chamber of Commerce of Montreal.
- 2024: Robot Infidèle received the Passeurs culturels Award from the Université de Sherbrooke's cultural centre.
- 2025: The teeterboard act from Grand-Mess’ received the Jury’s "Coup de cœur" at the Festival Mondial du Cirque de Demain in Paris.

== In other media ==
- La Galerie: A short film inspired by the 2019 production, released in 2021.
