= Nofit State Circus =

Welsh circus company

Coordinates: 51.486632°N 3.160113°W

NoFit State Circus
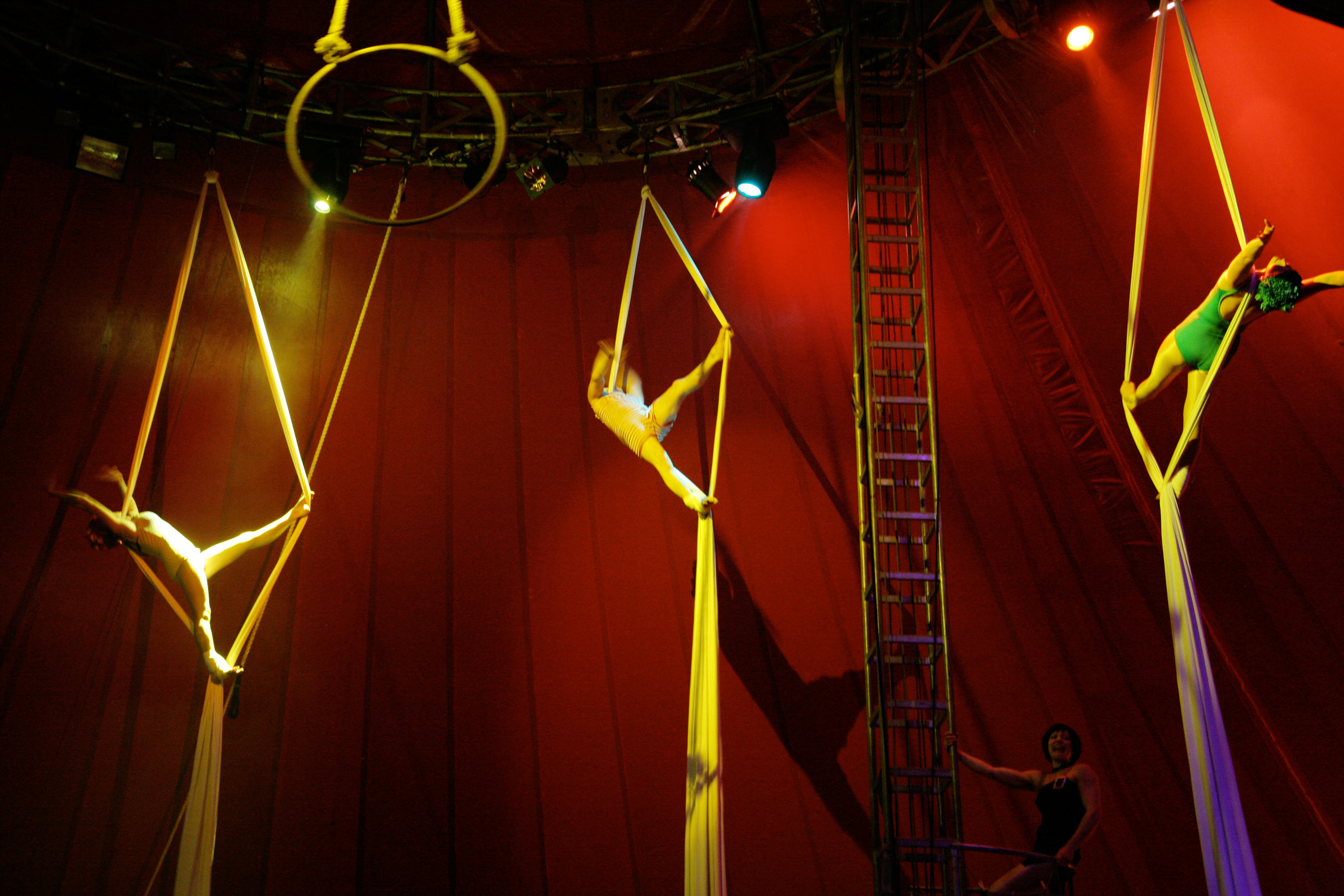
- The Immortal tour, 2006

Origin
- Country: United Kingdom (Wales)
- Year founded: 1986

Information
- Ringmaster(s): No
- Directors: Tom Rack; Alison Woods
- Travelling show?: Yes
- Circus tent?: Yes
- Winter quarters: Training in Cardiff
- Type of acts: Contemporary circus – anarchic fusion with theatre
- Other information: No animals
- Website: www.nofitstate.org

NoFit State Circus is a contemporary circus company based in Cardiff, Wales.

Formed in 1986, NoFit State Circus has toured tented and theatrical shows at home and abroad. They also maintain an active education programme and run community projects that allow non-professional performers to devise circus work, working alongside the company's professionals.

== Shows ==
=== Immortal ===
The company's first large-scale show Immortal was described by The Scotsman newspaper as a circus that "celebrates the human soul rather than just the human body", and elsewhere lauded as "rich, powerful stuff [...] overwhelming in its diversity of ideas". Writing in The Times, dance critic Donald Hutera gave a more measured response, saying that it was better to "surrender to the show's deceptively shambolic quicksilver atmosphere" than concentrate overmuch on the plot. Immortal won a Tap Water Award, an Editor's Choice Award from threeweeks.co.uk, and The Jury Award at Spain's Tarrega Festival.

=== Tabú ===
NoFit State's next show, Tabú, premiered at Tredegar Park, Newport, in April 2008, and toured across Britain and Europe. Directed by Firenza Guidi, who also worked on Immortal, Tabú shared much of Immortal's visual and narrative style and carried over some of the old cast. It received mixed reviews. Lyn Gardner writing for The Guardian called it "fabulous stuff that owes more to contemporary dance and experimental theatre than it does to sawdust and elephants", but others have criticized that the live show seems to have "no connection with the programme's bogglingly detailed back story", and that the circus skills on display "don't dramatise the original concept".

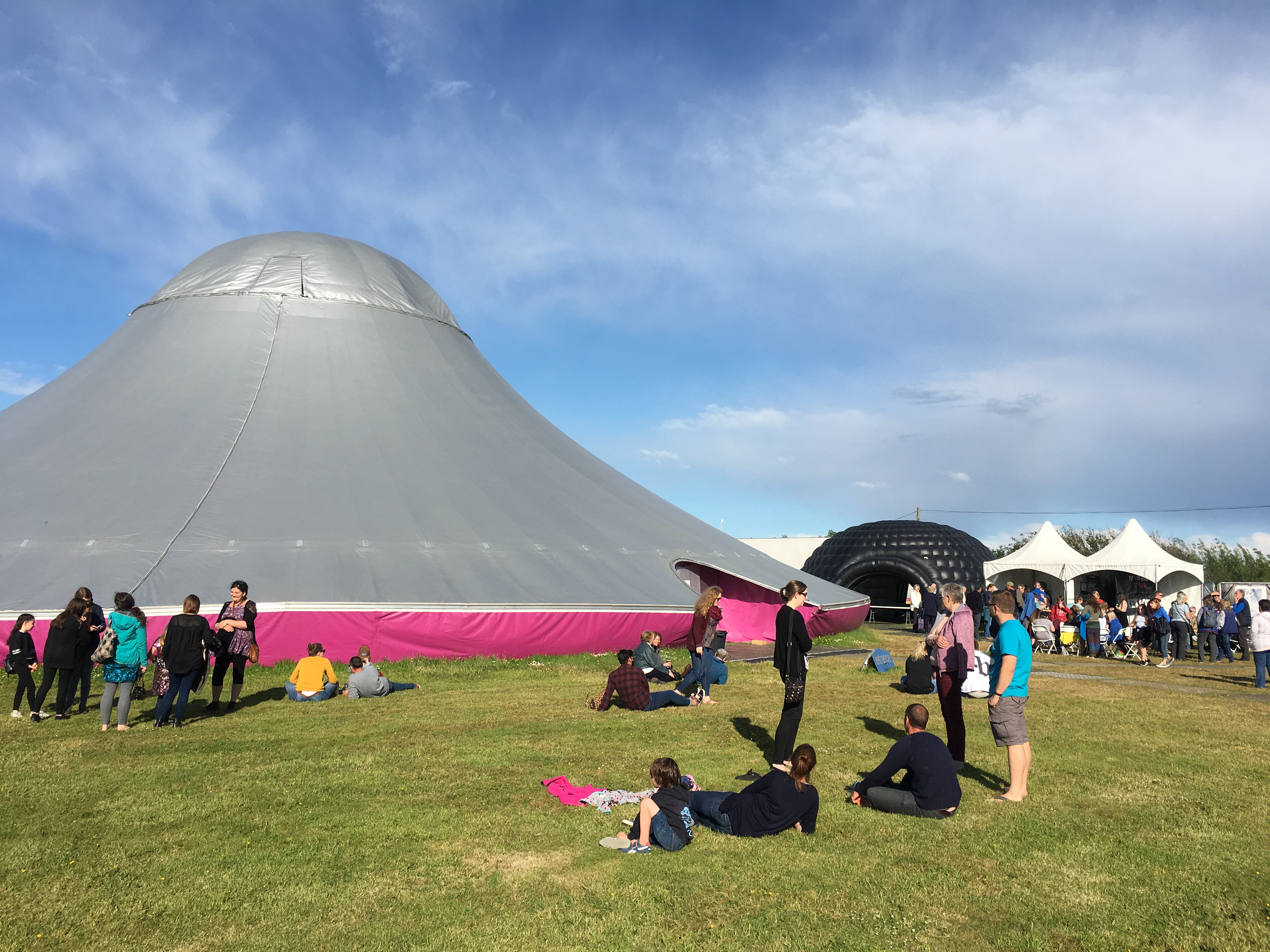
No Fit State Circus's performance tent

=== Bianco ===
In 2012, the company developed its show Bianco: Time for Beauty in partnership with the Eden Project. The promenade show, also directed by Firenza Guidi, ran in the tented performance space throughout the summer, and was described by This Is Cornwall as "an incredible experience". The show was then redeveloped to incorporate new ideas, acts and performers in 2013 to become Bianco: Turning Savage. It opened at The Roundhouse in April 2013, and was praised by The Guardian newspaper for "combining first-rate skills with a joyful, unashamed pleasure". Bianco: Turning Savage went on to tour venues across the UK in NoFit State's custom-designed big top spaceship tent, including a sell-out run at the Edinburgh Fringe Festival in August 2013. Bianco is the company's longest running show to date, touring for 5 years, including premiers in Australia, Hong Kong and New York City.

=== Block ===
BLOCK was the company's first outdoor touring production for many years, and was a co-production with dance-circus company Motionhouse. Created by Ali Williams of NoFit State and Kevin Finnan of Motionhouse, BLOCK used 20 large, grey Jenga-style blocks to create the performance. The show was part of the Without Walls commissioning programme in 2016 and ran for 5 years, touring extensively across the UK and Europe, and to South Korea, Hong Kong and Brisbane, Australia.

=== Lexicon ===
LEXICON was the first production created in the Big Top with seating and staging, marking a new chapter in the company's touring work following on from the immersive shows BIANCO and TABÚ. The show premiered in Newcastle-Under-Lyme as part of the Circus 250, the 250th anniversary of modern circus. The show was directed again by Firenza Guidi, who described the show as "a world inhabited by quiet misfits and furious poetry, a world of magic, laughter and lightness".

LEXICON's touring was interrupted by the COVID-19 pandemic in 2020, and returned for one final run of shows over Christmas 2021 and January 2022 where it was one of the few performances allowed to take place in Cardiff due to the Welsh Government's restrictions.

=== Sabotage ===
SABOTAGE was the second show to tour in the company's big top, directed by Firenza Guidi and was the first to be created and tour post-pandemic. The show was created in Haverfordwest and premiered in West Wales, with the Western Telegraph saying "Sabotage encapsulates the joy and the pain of what it means to be human". The show has toured extensively across the UK and was the company's first show to head to Europe in 2023, touring Lyon, Antwerp and Prague.

=== Bamboo ===
BAMBOO is the company's current outdoor touring production, created in 2024 and directed by Mish Weaver. BAMBOO was developed out of a collaboration between Imagineer Productions, Orit Azaz and NoFit State to explore what circus structures, stories and performance can be created with UK-grown bamboo.

=== Carnation ===
CARNATION is the company's current (2026) big top-based touring show, again directed by Firenza Guidi, and marks the 40th Anniversary of Nofit State. Opening in Porthcawl, the show travelled to Brighton, Bristol and Galway, before returning to Wales for runs in Carmarthen and Cardiff.

== Other activities ==
The business has additionally engaged in outdoor work. Orit Azaz, the director of Parklife and Open House, invited local amateur and professional performance groups to practise in front of the public with NoFit State performers. A large-scale outdoor production called Barricade, which Azaz also directed, was seen by audiences in the UK and France.

Since 2006 NoFit State has been running a permanent training space and school in Cardiff. They provide a variety of aerial and ground-based classes for all experience levels, including ropes, silks, aerial hoop, static trapeze, acro-balance and juggling. The company runs a youth circus program, with some of their students going on to study at Circomedia.

In January 2015, NoFit State was invited to the south of France as a featured company at the first edition of the Biennale Internationale des Arts du Cirque.

On 11 December 2015, the company launched a 30th-anniversary exhibition at its Four Elms building in Adamsdown, Cardiff, as well as the NoFit State E-Archive, which details the company's 30-year history. On the same night, the company's co-founder and one of its creative directors, Ali Williams, announced that she was to step down from her current role with the company, later in 2016.

In 2016, the NoFit State celebrated its 30th anniversary. In February the company made its Chinese premiere performing Bianco at Queen Elizabeth Stadium in Hong Kong, and later on, in May, its US debut in partnership with St. Ann's Warehouse in New York City.

They also do sessions for younger children and adults.

== History ==
- Immortal: 2002–2006
- Tabu: 2008–2010
- Labyrinth: 2011`
- Mundo Paralelo: 2012
- Barricade: 2012
- Parklife: 2012
- Bianco: 2012–2015
- Noodles: 2013–2015
- Open House: 2013–2015
- Block: 2016–2019
- Lexicon: 2018–2022
- Sabotage: 2022–2025
- Bamboo: 2024–
- Carnation: 2026–
