= Flambeaux (performer) =

Fire performer

Flambeaux the fire performer came to the U.S. in 1989 and built one of the first careers as a fire artist and entertainer, eventually making it to the Top 40 on NBC's hit series America's Got Talent season 3. His audition performance was featured on-air, although his second show in Las Vegas only had a few clips aired on the show. He made it to the semi-final third round in Los Angeles where he was voted off the show.

He created, produced and performed fire shows worldwide, based in New York City since 1991 in infamous venues such as the Limelight, The Blue Angel [Le Scandal]], The Diamond Horseshoe and was a featured regular act at Randy Weiner's 'Queen of the Night', Abby Hertz' 'LUST' and Simon Hammerstein's The Box.

Flambeaux became an underground icon in downtown New York City through his performance troupe dubbed "The P-Cult". The P-Cult formed in 1999 and "The Calling" in 2015 (web|url=http://www.TheCallingFireshow.com) and created the first and largest Fire Arts production and entertainment company of its time in 2008, '"Flambeaux Fire", web|url=http://www.flambeauxfire.com

He first learned fire through his time spent around the circus Archaos in London from 1988 to 1989.

He now teaches fire arts and performance with his school at the Circus Training theatre 'Paradigm Theatre' in Brooklyn and produces performers and shows with fire, and has just released his book 'Running Towards The Flames' (2026) by Bluestone Publishing.
