= Cirkus Cirkör =

Swedish circus company

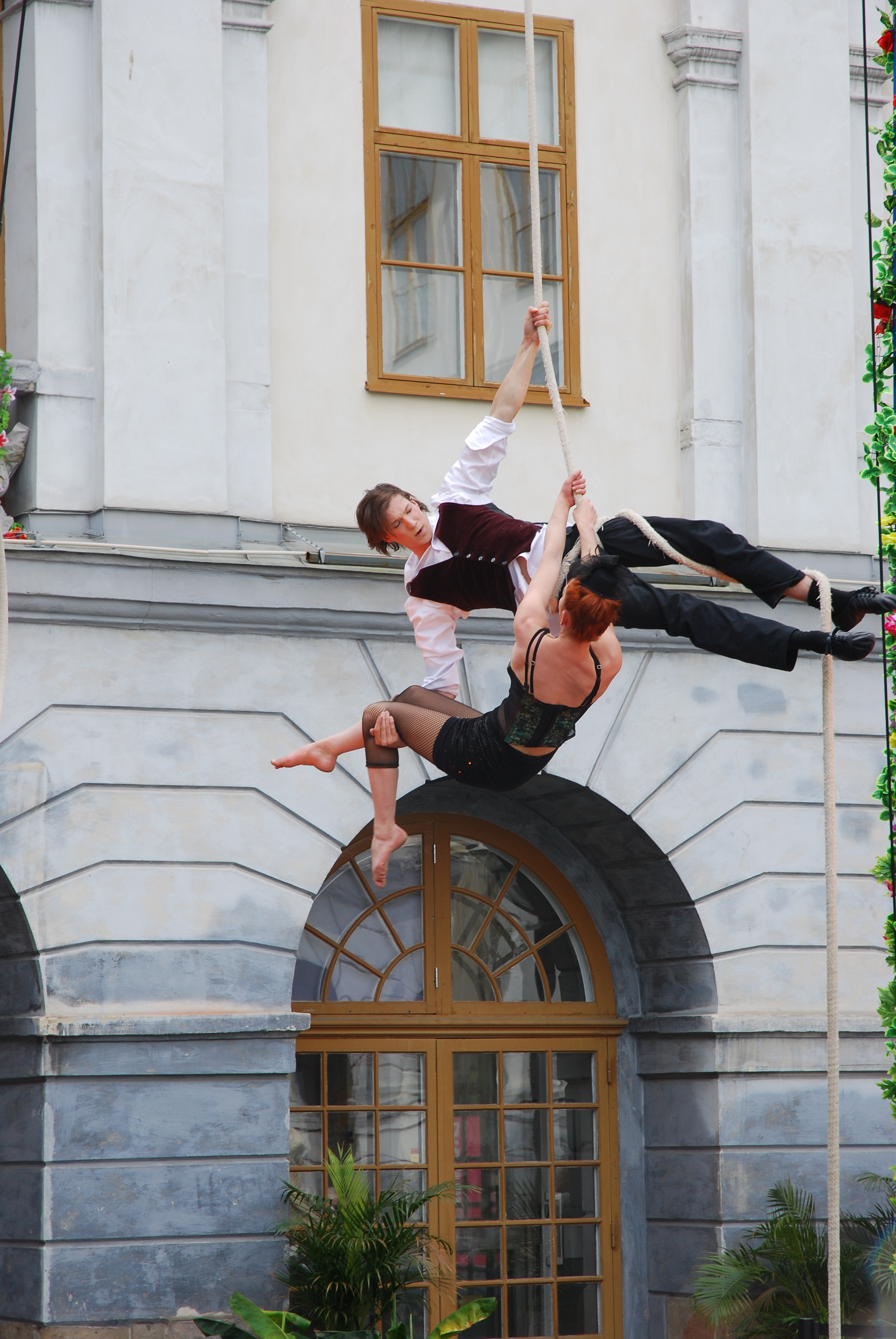
Cirkus Cirkör performers in Stockholm.

Cirkus Cirkör is a Swedish circus company, and is today Scandinavia's leading performing circus company within the art form of contemporary circus. Cirkus Cirkör has toured the world with a number of circus shows. The company has also been influential in establishing new schools and training courses for aspiring contemporary circus artists in Sweden and Scandinavia.

== History ==
Cirkus Cirkör emerged as a small independent contemporary circus group, founded in Stockholm in 1995. The company was formed Tilde Björfors. Cirkus Cirkör was one of Sweden's very first contemporary circus groups, inspired by Cirque du Soleil, among others. Cirkus Cirkör, however, moves more towards vaudeville- and variety show-inspired circus shows in expression, preferring small and intimate stage shows (in smaller playhouses and older theatre stages), in contrast to big, Las Vegas-style circus shows.

The company's style in contemporary circus often mixes elements of street theatre, rock video aesthetics, and various other forms of theatrical expression such as theatre, dance and film.

Cirkus Cirkör tours regularly with several shows each year, both in Sweden and abroad. Cirkus Cirkör's famous base and home arena, the "Subtopia", is located in the Stockholm suburb of Alby (in Botkyrka Municipality), south of Stockholm.

The Circus Cirkör was chosen as a featured company for the second edition of the Biennale Internationale des Arts du Cirque held in 30 cities across the south of France in early 2017.

== Europe Theatre Prize ==
In 2018, the Circus Cirkör was awarded the XV Europe Prize Theatrical Realities, in Saint Petersburg, with the following motivation:

Conceived as a non-profit organisation, Cirkus Cirkör combines the production of shows with intense social and educational activity with its added interest in theatre and comic routines. This circus has since 1995 offered popular spectacles of great professionalism, amusing and full of energy, in which the arts of circus, expressed with extraordinary grace, technique and courage, interact in turn with pop music, music hall or street theatre, while at other times serving classics such as Shakespeare’s Romeo and Juliet. Cirkus Cirkör prefers to work in confined spaces, where contact with an enthusiastic audience is not buried under huge installations and scenery that run the risk of not merely surprising, but also distracting the spectators: it is circus that comes from the heart, with a social spirit that brings back to the art of circus its most enjoyable and poetic dimension.

== Shows ==
A selection of shows by Cirkus Cirkör:

- 2024 Tipping Point
- 2022 Circus Life
- 2022 Pippi at the Circus
- 2021 Puff, Circus Days and Nights
- 2019 Bloom, God's Disobedeant Rib
- 2018 Epifónima
- 2017 Under
- 2016 Limits
- 2015 Borders
- 2014 Underart
- 2014 Knitting Peace
- 2011/2012: Undermän
- 2010: Wear it like a Crown
- 2008/2009: Inside Out
- 2007: Odyssén, Dada Aitsch, Mannen i ballongen, Olika, Cirkusliv
- 2006: Momo eller kampen om tiden, Cirkusliv, Havfruen
- 2005: 99% unknown, Havfruen, Cirkusliv, Ung Cirkör:Kalla Balla Lik
- 2004: 99% unknown, Cirkusliv, Ung Cirkör:Kalla Balla Lik
- 2003: Fantastix, Romeo & Julia, Miss.Lyckad, T.I.D. – This is dangerous, Cirkusliv, Ung Cirkör - 10.000 Volt
- 2002: Romeo & Julia, TRIX
- 2001: Dom Vuxna?, TRIX, Crash, Cirkusliv, Virus 02, Pieces, Cirkusliv
- 2000: TRIX, Bensin, Mr Pain, 00:00
- 1999: 00:00, URGA Marimé
- 1998: Supercirkör 98, URGA Marimé
- 1997: Kod XY, På
- 1996: På, Ur kaos föds allt
- 1995: Skapelsen (Creation)

== Artistic director ==
- 1995–2023: Tilde Björfors

== Managing directors ==
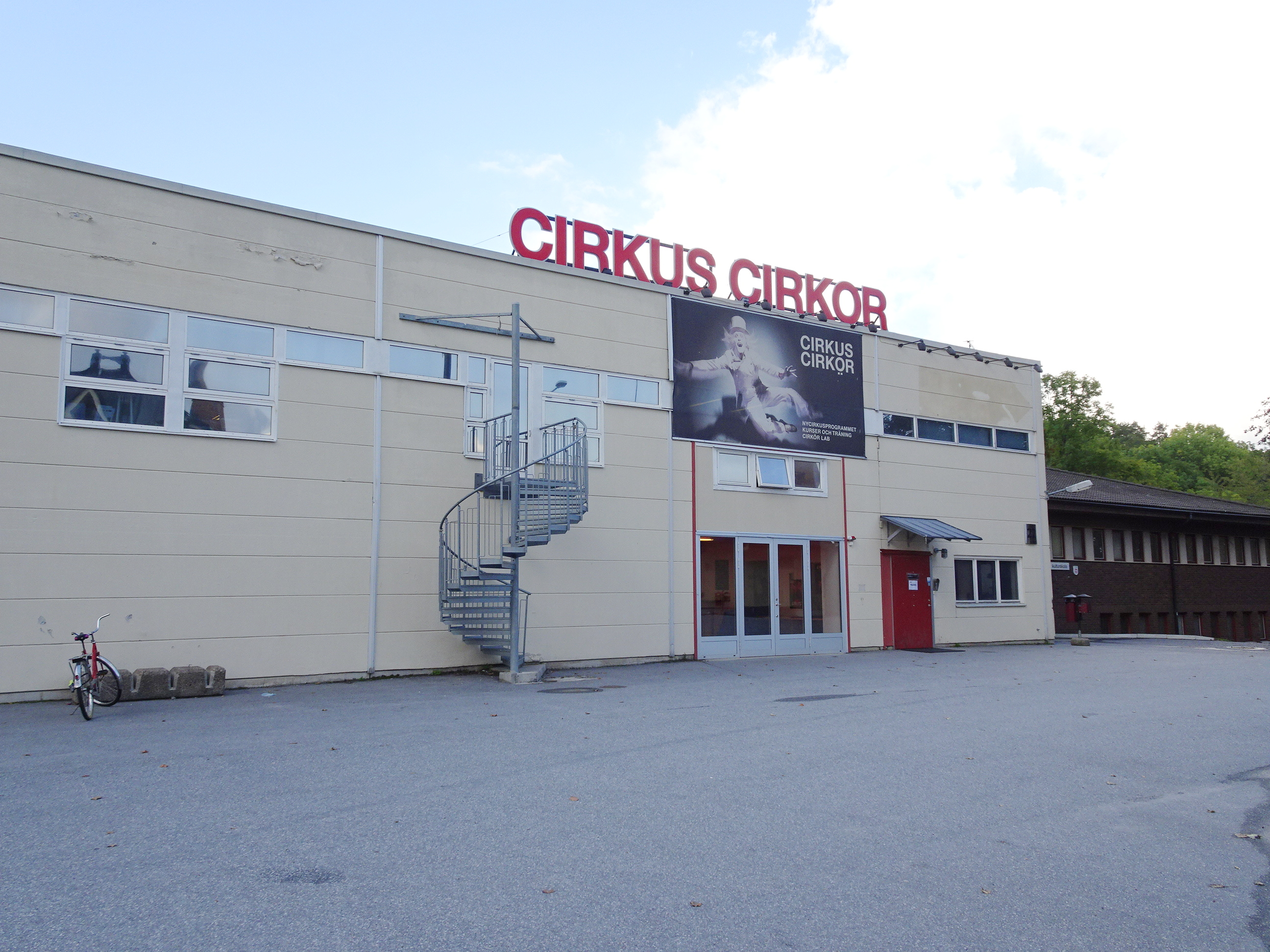
Cirkus Cirkör facility

- 1995-1999: Tilde Björfors
- 2000-2000: Yvonne Rock
- 2000-2002: Linda Zachrison
- 2002-2005: Malin Dahlberg
- 2005-2007: Kajsa Balkfors Lind (Cirkör Ideell Förening), Pia Kronqvist (Cirkör AB)
- 2007-2008: Pia Kronqvist
- 2008–2020: Anders Frennebrg
- 2020-2022 Elin Norquist
- 2023- Kajsa Giertz
