= Warwick Arts Centre =

Multi-venue arts complex at the University of Warwick in Coventry, England

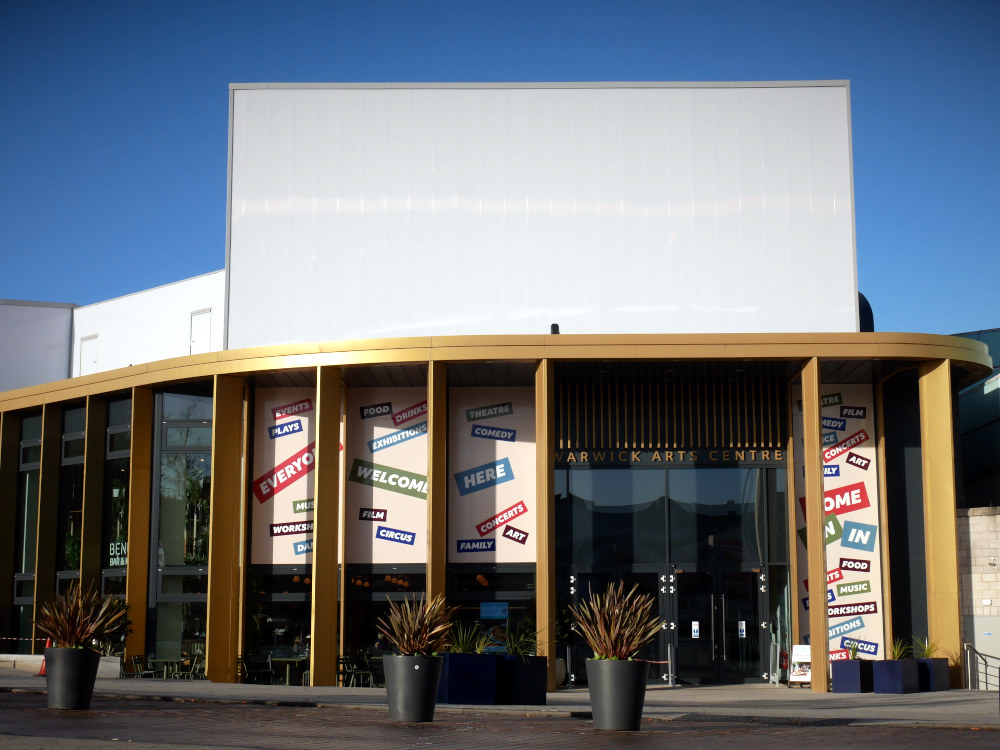
- Warwick Arts Centre, Main Entrance
- Interactive map of Warwick Arts Centre
- Address: University of Warwick; Coventry; England
- Coordinates: 52.3798°N 1.5617°W
- Owner: University of Warwick
- Capacity: Butterworth Hall: 1,340; Theatre: 547; Studio: 150; Helen Martin Studio: 143; Woods-Scawen Room: 250; National Grid Room: 50; Creative learning Space: 30; Screens; Cinema 1: 210; Cinema 2: 137; Cinema 3: 53
- Type: performing arts centre

Construction
- Opened: 1974; 52 years ago
- Architect: Renton, Howard, Wood Associates

Website
- www.warwickartscentre.co.uk

Warwick Arts Centre is a multi-venue arts complex at the University of Warwick in Coventry, England. It attracts around 300,000 visitors a year to over 3,000 individual events embracing all types of theatre and performance, contemporary and classical music, dance, comedy, visual art, films, talks and family events. Warwick Arts Centre is the largest arts centre in the Midlands, and the largest venue of its kind in the UK outside the Barbican Centre in London.

Warwick Arts Centre consists of numerous spaces on the same site, including a large 1,500 capacity concert hall, theatre, three cinemas, art gallery (Mead Gallery), Helen Martin Studio and conference room, as well as learning space, hospitality suites, a café and bars.

The centre houses the University of Warwick Music Centre with practice rooms, and an ensemble rehearsal room where music societies and groups rehearse.

== History ==
The Arts Centre was the brainchild of first vice-chancellor Jack Butterworth and American benefactor Helen Martin – who was at the time anonymous.

Commissioned in 1970 – and opened in October 1974 – the Arts Centre was designed by architects Renton, Howard, Wood Associates, and the building went on to win a RIBA award. Initially with a theatre, studio theatre, conference room and a music centre, the venue was expanded further with the larger Butterworth Hall in 1981 and Mead Gallery, along with a cinema, in 1986.

Following a four-year redevelopment, the largest in its history, the Arts Centre reopened to events in October 2021. Work included extensive upgrades of existing spaces, a new foyer, three new cinemas, and a new restaurant.

This was followed in January 2022 with the reopening of the repositioned Mead Gallery. With a floor area of 6,458sq ft, it is the largest single dedicated contemporary exhibition space in the region.

In autumn 2024, Warwick Arts Centre celebrated its 50th anniversary "with a programme honouring community creativity and its power to make change". The programme was entitled Rebels With A Cause!

Among those who have visited the Arts Centre are Terry Pratchett, Jeremy Irons, Jimmy Carr, Eddie Izzard, Hugh Laurie, Ken Loach, and Russell Brand, as well as Motionhouse, City of Birmingham Symphony Orchestra, Chineke! Orchestra, Goodness Gracious Me, The Smiths, Jasper Carrott, Kirsty McColl, Yehudi Menuhin, Kiri Te Kanawa, Nigel Kennedy and Evelyn Glennie.

Warwick Arts Centre has been described as "one of the best places in the Midlands to watch theatre, comedy and other shows" with the building providing a "vibrant showcase for the very best in contemporary art, events and entertainment."

== Mead Gallery ==
Warwick Arts Centre's dedicated visual arts space, Mead Gallery, opened in May 1986. It was named to honour Phil Mead, a Coventry businessman who worked to develop support for the University and for Warwick Arts Centre, and designed by Renton Howard Wood Levine. It is a large, L-shaped space and presents three white cubes, which can be divided into three galleries.

The Mead opened with two exhibitions: Surprises In Store: Fifty Years of British Art (featuring work by Barbara Hepworth, L. S. Lowry, Paul Nash, Bridget Riley and others), and an exhibition exploring stage designs and sculptures by Fernand Léger.

Other artists who have had their work showcased by Mead over the years include sculptors Henri Gaudier-Brzeska, Henry Moore, Elisabeth Frink, David Nash, and Liliane Lijn; photographers Robert Doisneau, Bill Brandt, Fay Godwin, Willy Ronis, Walker Evans, Dorothea Lange; and printmaker Hokusai. Further exhibitions have highlighted the work of Steve McQueen, Peter Lanyon, Tom Phillips, Graham Sutherland, John Piper, Tracey Emin, Sarah Lucas, Hurvin Anderson, Grayson Perry, Douglas Gordon, Jeremy Deller, Joseph Beuys, Tacita Dean, and Olafur Eliasson.

The gallery closed in 2018 as part of the Warwick Arts Centre 20:20 Project to redevelop the building, reopening in January 2022 with Rana Begum: Dappled Light.

== The Koan ==
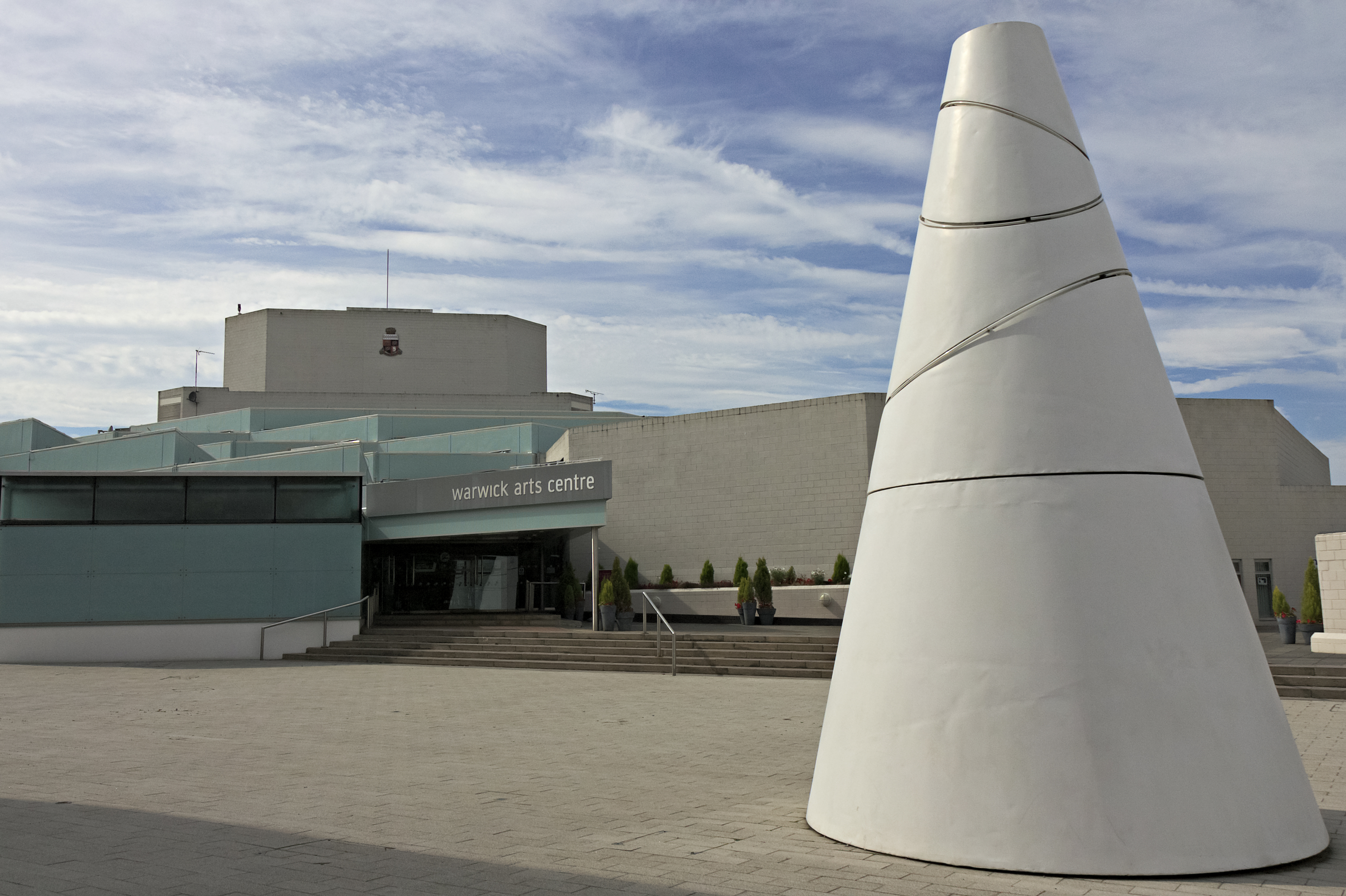
Warwick Arts Centre (c. 2012), with White Koan (1971) by Liliane Lijn in the foreground

A distinctive feature outside of the arts centre is White Koan by American-born artist Liliane Lijn, which was purchased by the university in 1972.

Taking the form of a rotating, conical construction with light-up elements, the piece combines industrial materials and artistic processes. Liliane is known for exploring the interaction between art, science, technology and eastern philosophy and mythology.

A number of popular myths have grown around the piece since it was installed, including that it was the nose cone of a failed Apollo mission, and has several nightclubs underneath it.

The work forms part of the Sculpture Park which also includes work by Richard Deacon, Peter Randall-Page, Laura Ford, David Nash, Allen Jones, Jake and Dinos Chapman and others.
