= National Dance Awards 2005 =

To recognise excellence in professional dance in the United Kingdom, The Critics' Circle organised and presented the National Dance Awards 2005. The ceremony was held at the Royal Opera House, London, on 19 January 2006, with awards given for productions staged in the previous year.

== Awards Presented ==
- De Valois Award for Outstanding Achievement in Dance - Monica Mason, Artistic Director of The Royal Ballet
- Best Male Dancer - Thomas Lund, of the Royal Danish Ballet
- Best Female Dancer - Marianela Nuñez, of The Royal Ballet
- Working Title Billy Elliot Prize - Kristopher Spencer
- Audience Award - Northern Ballet Theatre and Motionhouse Dance Theatre
- Dance UK Industry Award - Brendan Keaney
- Best Choreography (Classical) - Sir Frederick Ashton, for Sylvia for The Royal Ballet (Restaged by Christopher Newton)
- Best Choreography (Modern) - Russell Maliphant, for Broken Fall for George Piper Dances and The Royal Ballet
- Best Choreography (Musical Theatre) - Peter Darling, for Billy Elliot the Musical at the Victoria Palace Theatre
- Outstanding Male or Female Artist (Modern) - Akram Khan, for performances with his own company
- Outstanding Male or Female Artist (Classical) - Rupert Pennefather, of The Royal Ballet
- Company Prize for Outstanding Repertoire (Classical) - The Royal Ballet
- Company Prize for Outstanding Repertoire (Modern) - Rambert Dance Company
- Best Foreign Dance Company - Australian Ballet from Australia

== Special awards ==
No special awards were presented for the 2005 season.
