= Cirque Surreal =

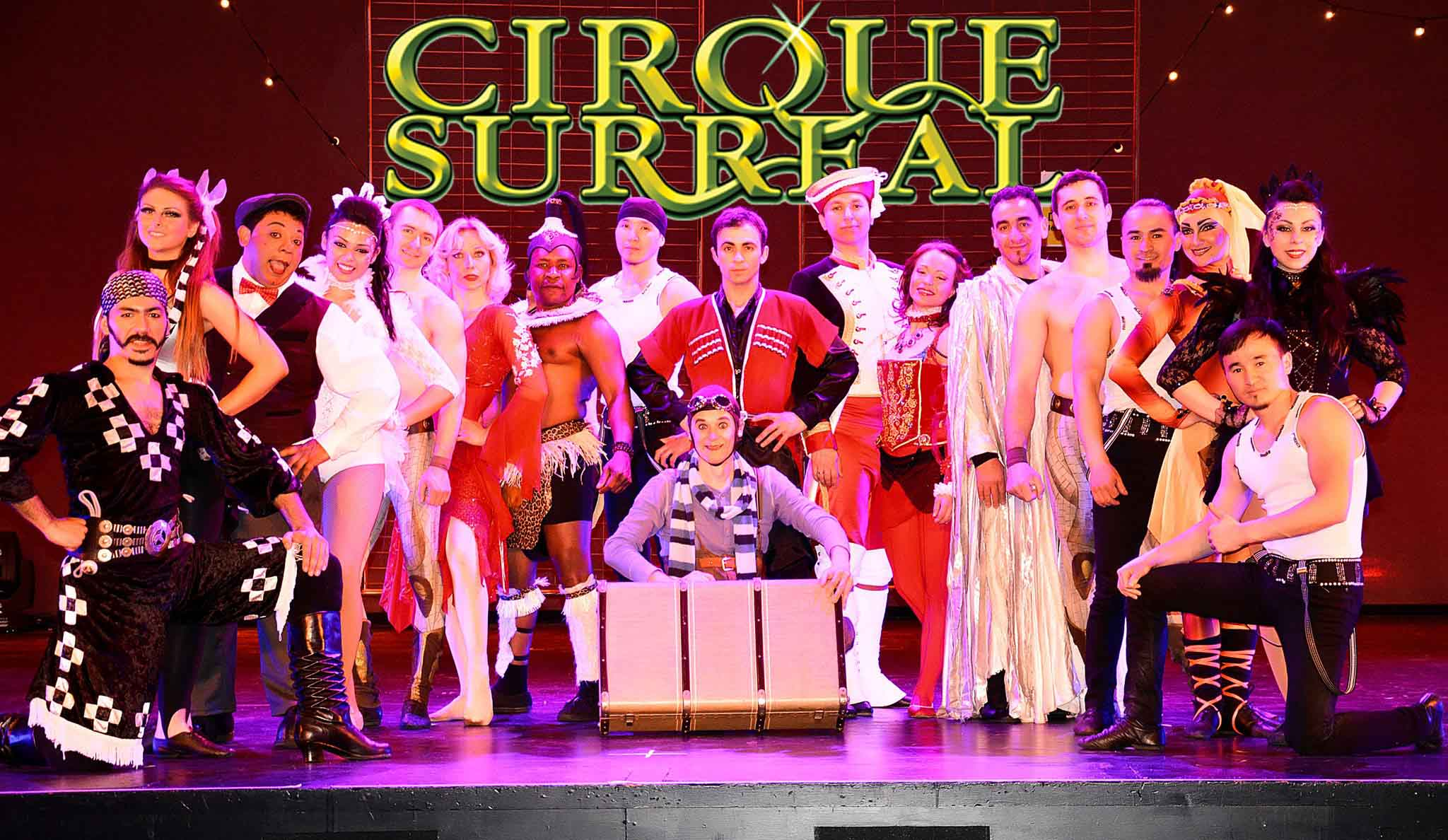
The April 2015 cast of Cirque Surreal: Voyagers at The Lowry.

Cirque Surreal is a circus from Phillip and Carol Gandey, producers of the Chinese State Circus. A new circus, the Cirque Surreal made its name by touring, among other events, some of the major UK arts festivals, such as the Edinburgh Fringe and the Brighton Festival Fringe.

The show constitutes a mix of performers from over 11 different countries, performing in a big top tent with a raised stage, it also plays in theatres.

Cirque Surreal went on to tour the UK extensively also being contracted by Sky 1 T.V. as the host circus for its hit reality show Cirque De Celebrite for two 16-week runs in 2006 and 2007. The production also appeared in Dubai, Luanda and Abu Dhabi in 2013/2014 and most recently played The Lowry Theatre in Salford in April 2015.

In 2019, Cirque Surreal premiered the new show "Quirki" at the Trafford Centre in Manchchester, ‘A Night at the Museum’ meets contemporary circus in this big top spectacular. Audiences will be transported from the heart of Mexico, to unexplored worlds of fantasy, where strange creatures from supernatural realms illuminate and come to life in spellbinding set-pieces of physical improbabilities. The show led the British Theatre guide to remark "Quirki "Quirki proves the circus can still dazzle and thrill audiences"

Cirque Surreal is produced and promoted by Gandey World Class Production - for more information on the show visit www.gandey.com or www.cirquesurreal.com.
