= Pierrot Bidon =

French circus promoter (1954–2010)

Pierrot Bidon (1 January 1954 – 9 March 2010) was a French circus promoter. He formed circus troupe Archaos in 1984 and directed The Circus of Horrors in 1995. His work with Archaos revolutionised the concept of the contemporary circus in Europe. The Independent newspaper described him as being "one of the founding fathers of New Circus" while The Daily Telegraph argued his work paved the way for the success of companies such as the Cirque de Soleil.
