= Motionhouse =

British dance company

Motionhouse is a British dance-circus company based in Royal Leamington Spa, Warwickshire, England.

== History ==
Motionhouse was founded in 1988. The company has produced 18 full-length, mid-scale touring productions and a series of dance performances throughout the United Kingdom. It also provides community education programs, as well as outreach and community work to promote more accessible dance education.

Motionhouse has three festival works in its repertoire: Cascade, Underground, and Chaser, which are widely performed across the United Kingdom and Europe. These works generally require fewer dancers than the company's theatre productions, are smaller and therefore easier to tour, and are shorter, lasting between fifteen and twenty-five minutes. As a result, the company can perform at multiple festivals simultaneously.

Motionhouse won the Audience Award in the National Dance Awards 2005. The company's 2005 production Perfect won critical acclaim and was included on the GCSE syllabus for dance in England and Wales. Its 2008 production, Underground, won the Audience Prize at the 2009 Miramiro Festival in Ghent, Belgium.

=== 2009: Scattered ===
Scattered, Motionhouse's 18th theatre production, premiered in October 2009 at the Warwick Arts Centre. During its first year of touring, the production opened the Sibiu International Theatre Festival in Romania, where it was described by the festival director as the "revelation of the festival". Scattered completed its first international tour in 2011 and was later performed in Macau, China, Hong Kong, Japan, Belgium, and Portugal, and on two tours of the United States and five tours of the United Kingdom. During this time, Motionhouse was represented by IMG Artists in the U.S., Asia–Pacific, and Europe.

=== 2011: Waiting Game and Traction ===
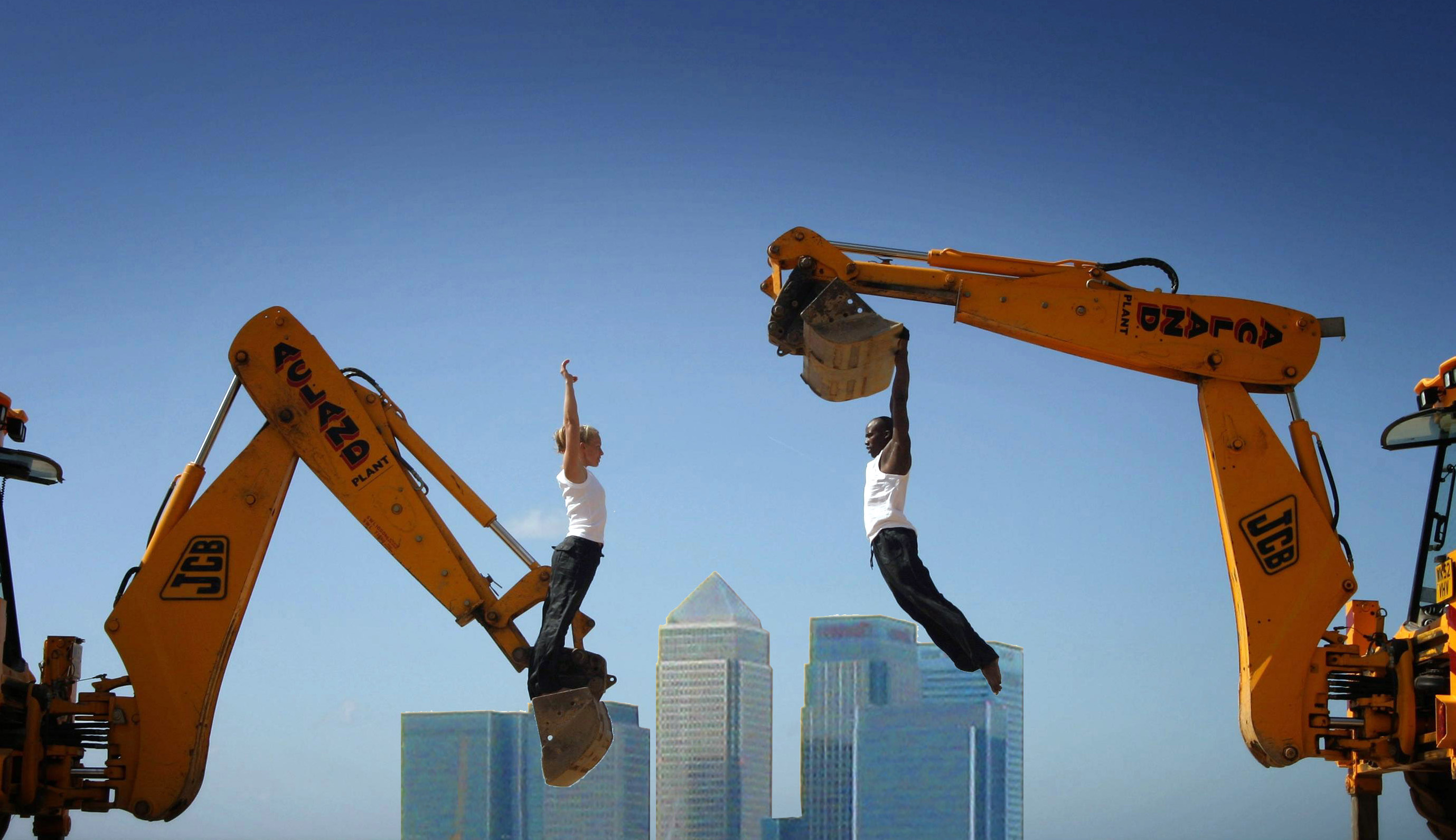
Waiting Game

In 2011, Motionhouse collaborated with several JCB excavator operators to create two new pieces for their Machine Dance collection: Waiting Game and Traction. Waiting Game, featuring two dancers and a JCB excavator, premiered on 3 March 2011.

Traction premiered in November 2011. It was commissioned by the Bull Ring shopping centre in Birmingham to celebrate a new development in the complex. The performance featured six dancers and three JCB excavators.

=== 2012: The Voyage ===
In 2012, Motionhouse was commissioned to produce an outdoor event as part of the London 2012 Festival in the West Midlands to commemorate the London 2012 Olympic and Paralympic Games. The company created The Voyage in partnership with Legs on the Wall, an Australian physical theatre company, and the Birmingham Hippodrome. The Voyage was performed on a 50-foot (15 m) replica of a cruise liner in Victoria Square, Birmingham, from 21 June to 24 June 2012. The event featured professional dancers and aerialists, as well as an amateur choir, live musicians, and more than 140 community performers.

In the lead-up to The Voyage, Motionhouse ran a participatory project called Quest, which gave young people from the West Midlands the opportunity to take part in the London 2012 celebrations. Beginning in March 2012, Motionhouse worked with eight community groups, whose members later performed in the production.

== Funding ==
Motionhouse is a National Portfolio Organisation of Arts Council England and receives support from Warwick District Council. Following the 2010 Comprehensive Spending Review by the coalition government, the company's funding was reduced from approximately £270,000 to £250,000.

On 30 March 2011, Arts Council England announced a further reduction in funding of around 11% for Motionhouse, while four other West Midlands-based dance organisations received significant increases.

== Productions ==
Year	Title	Notes	Ref
2025	Hidden		
2022	Henge	Created for Bluestone National Park Resort.	
2021	Nobody		
2019	Wild	Won the Emilio Zapatero Award for the Judge’s Best Circus Show and the Audience Award at TAC, Valladolid in May 2025; won the Audience Award at the Internationales Straßentheater Festival in Holzminden, Germany in June 2025.	
2016	Block	Created with NoFit State Circus.	
2015	Charge		
2013	Broken		
2012	The Voyage	Created in partnership with Australian physical theatre company Legs On The Wall.	
2011	Traction		
2011	Waiting Game		
2010	Cascade	Premiered 1 July 2010 at Greenwich+Docklands International Festival.	
2009	Scattered	Music by Sophy Smith and film by Logela Multimedia; set by Simon Dormon and lighting by Natasha Chivers.	
2008	Underground	Commissioned by Birmingham Hippodrome, Fierce! Festival and Without Walls.	
2008	Run!	Music by Errolyn Wallen.	
2007	Driven		
2005	Chaser	Created with the support of Lichfield Garrick, Mac, Solihull Arts Complex and Birmingham Hippodrome.	
2005	Dreams and Ruin	Developed in partnership with DanceFest, Worcester Arts Workshop, ACE Dance and Music and Angela Woodhouse.	
2005	Perfect		
2005	Renaissance		
2004	Road To The Beach: The Edge	Performed on the beach at Watergate Bay, Cornwall, featuring 1000 children and adults from the local community.	
2004	Dancing Inside	Featuring nine inmates of HM Prison Dovegate in Staffordshire, England.	
2002	Volatile	Music by Sophie Smith and Tim Dickinson.	
2001	Fearless		
1999	Atomic	Motionhouse's first festival piece for multi scale touring.	
1999	Twisted		
1998	Faking It	Motionhouse's tenth anniversary piece.	
1996	Delicate	Script by A. L. Kennedy and music by Howard Skempton, performed by the Birmingham Contemporary Music Group.	
1995	Geisha	Commissioned by the Warwick Arts Centre for its 20th anniversary; choreographed by Louise Richards and Kevin Finnan.	
1994	Flying	Set created by Simon Dormon and steel artist Davey Boyle. Music by Alain Bauman.	
1994	Punch	Music by Jesus Jones, Kronos Quartet, Curve and Sundial.	
1993	Arcadio/Déjà Vu	Featured a set by Spanish installation artist Rosa Sanchez.	
1992	The Curtsy Play	Choreographed by Louise Richards. Created with a Bonnie Bird British Choreography Award.	
1992	Speed and Light	First of Motionhouse's combinations of theatre and film. Film by Christopher Gowans and music by Ray Lee and Harry Dawes.	
1991	House of Bones	Music by Paul Newham.	
1990	The Ticking Man	Set created by Simon Dormon, music by Harry Dawes and Ray Lee.	
1989	A Curious Day	Motionhouse's first major project, and the Southern Arts Board's first dance and education project. Music by Harry Dawes and Simon Prince.	
