= Chinese State Circus =

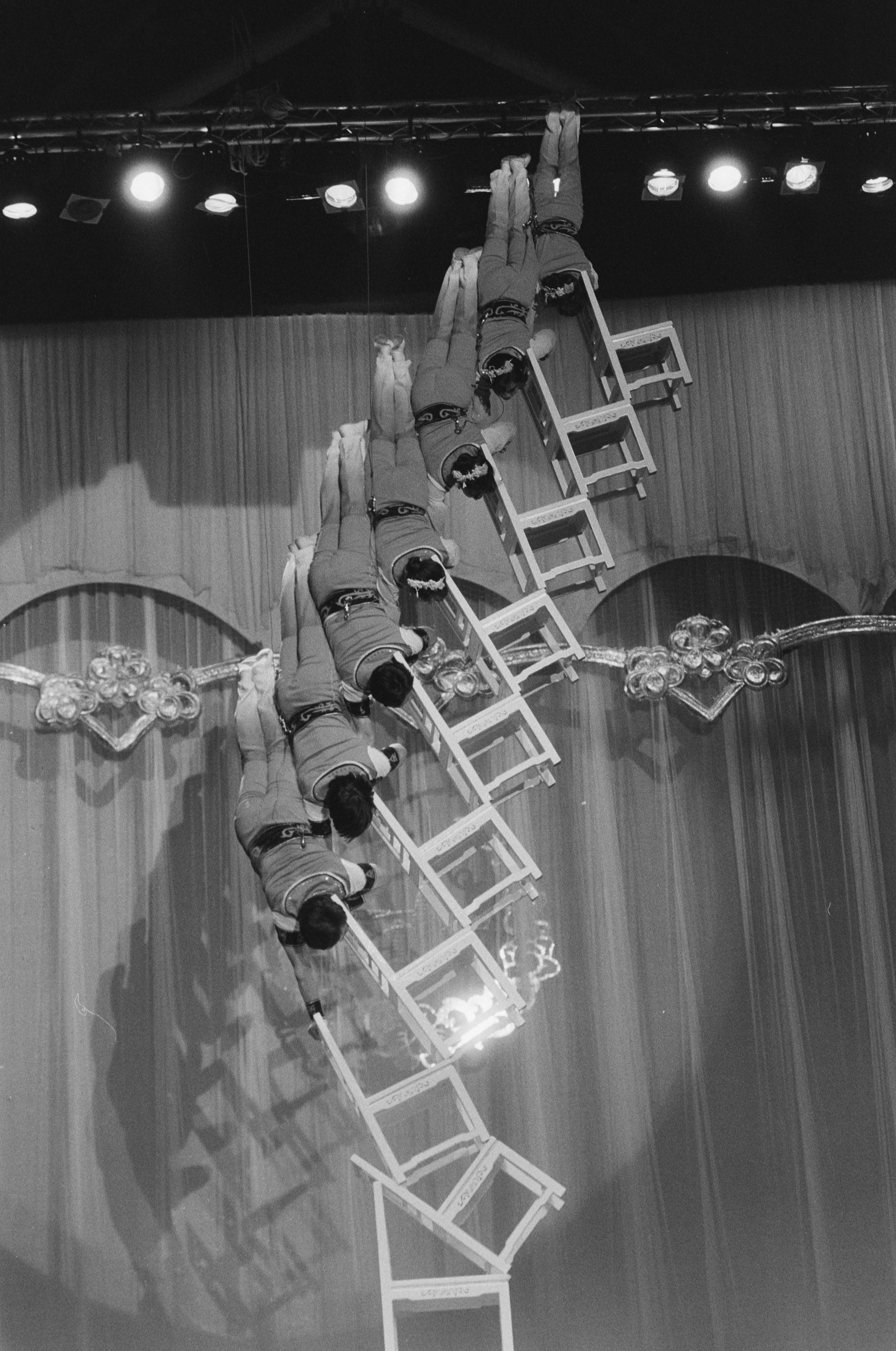
Acrobats of the Chinese State Circus touring in Amsterdam in 1987

The Chinese State Circus is a touring circus production that introduces European audiences to the traditional performance arts of China. Its programme is built around Chinese acrobatic disciplines, with all performers originating from China and trained in the classical Chinese tradition of Ma Xi (horse theatre). Unlike many Western circuses, the Chinese State Circus does not feature live animals.

The show integrates kung fu from the Shaolin Temple, performers from the Peking opera, and other specialty acts drawn from Chinese performance heritage. A central character — the Monkey King — links the various acts, which include a lion dance, plate spinning, diabolo juggling, aerial silks, and excerpts of Chinese opera.

Chinese acrobatics have a long and distinct history in China, evolving from the daily life and work of its people. Archaeological evidence such as historical records, ancient carvings, and decorative motifs indicate that acrobatics were performed during the Warring States period more than two thousand years ago. By the Qin and Han dynasties (221 BC – 220 AD), acrobatic performers had developed a broad repertoire of skills, and the art form was known as “the show of a hundred tricks.” During the Han era, acrobatics became recognised as a highly developed performing art.

Over the past several decades, Chinese acrobatic troupes have undertaken extensive international tours, presenting their highly skilled performances to audiences in more than 100 countries and territories. These tours have received strong appreciation and acclaim from the people of many nations.

The Chinese State Circus itself was founded in the 1990s after British director Phillip Gandey saw a troupe of Chinese acrobats earn widespread praise at the Monte Carlo Circus Festival. Inspired by the depth and diversity of the performances he witnessed, Gandey organised a touring company to bring this art form to Western audiences.

== Tours ==
The Chinese State Circus has toured the United Kingdom continuously since 1992. The circus is owned and produced by Gandey World Class Productions.

- In December 2012, the troupe made history by staging the first major international entertainment event in Angola in over 40 years with their production Mulan.
- 2013, the company toured the UK extensively with their show Yin Yang.
- In 2015, the Chinese State Circus was featured in the programme for the inaugural Biennale Internationale des Arts du Cirque in the south of France.
- In 2016, a new production called Dynasty premiered at the Nottingham Concert Hall and then toured theatres across the UK, including extended performances under big top tents.
- In 2017, following the success of the previous tour, the Chinese State Circus embarked on a major big top tour of the UK, beginning at Sandown Racecourse in Esher and continuing through late autumn.

== See also ==
- Cirque Surreal – a related circus production also produced by Gandey World Class Production
