= Carters Steam Fair =

UK travelling vintage fair

- Locations: Various
- Home base / winter quarters: Adjacent to White Waltham Airfield, near Maidenhead, Berkshire
- Country: United Kingdom
- Founded: 1976
- Founders: John and Anna Carter
- Operators: The Carter Family and associates
- Number of rides: Around 19 (dependent on site/ location)
- Website: www.carterssteamfair.co.uk

Carters Steam Fair (no apostrophe is used in the name) was a travelling vintage fair in England, founded in 1977 by John Carter (1942–2000), later managed by the next generation of Carters.

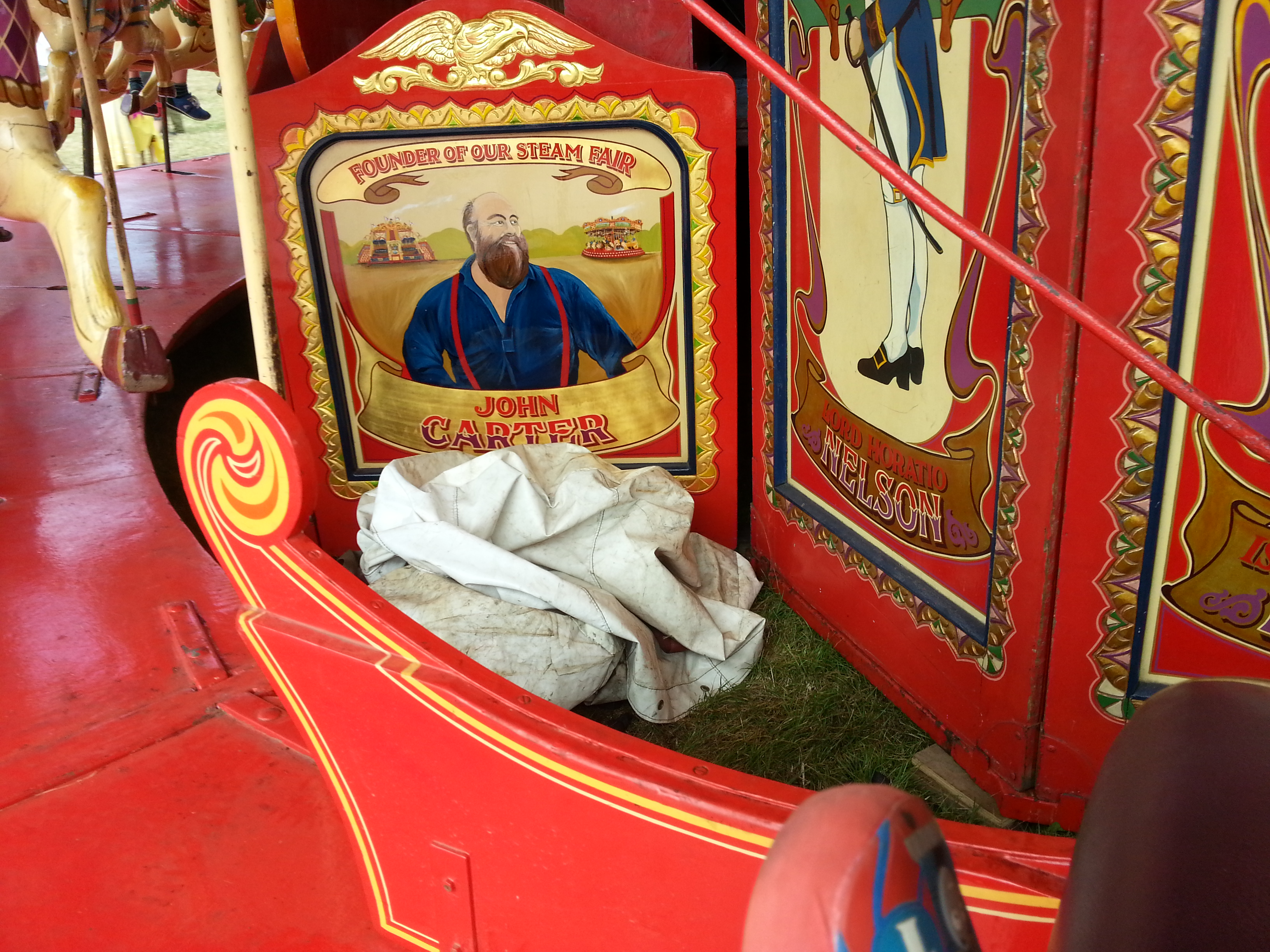
John Carter

Carters operated and maintained a large collection of vintage rides and side stalls, ranging in date from the 1870s to the 1960s, and every season they travelled with vintage heavy lorries and traditional showmen's living wagons. The fair provided an opportunity to enjoy historic equipment and artwork.

Their operating base and restoration workshops were immediately adjacent to White Waltham Airfield, near Maidenhead, in Berkshire.

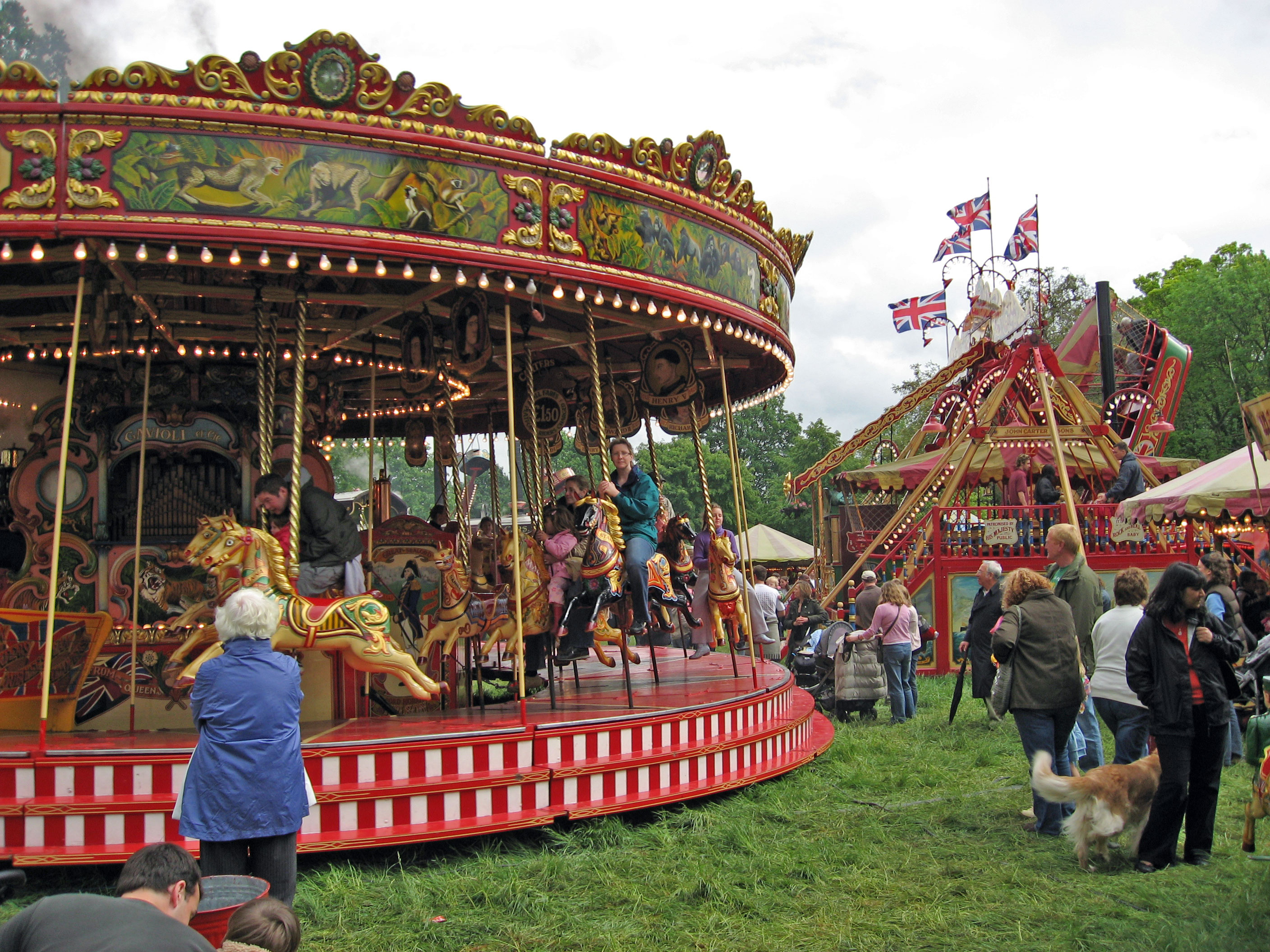
Steam-powered gallopers (left); steam yachts (right)

Carters held a final 'travelling steam-fair' ending at Prospect Park, Reading on 30 October 2022, finding new homes for some of their vintage rides, with the remainder up for sale.

== Rides and attractions ==
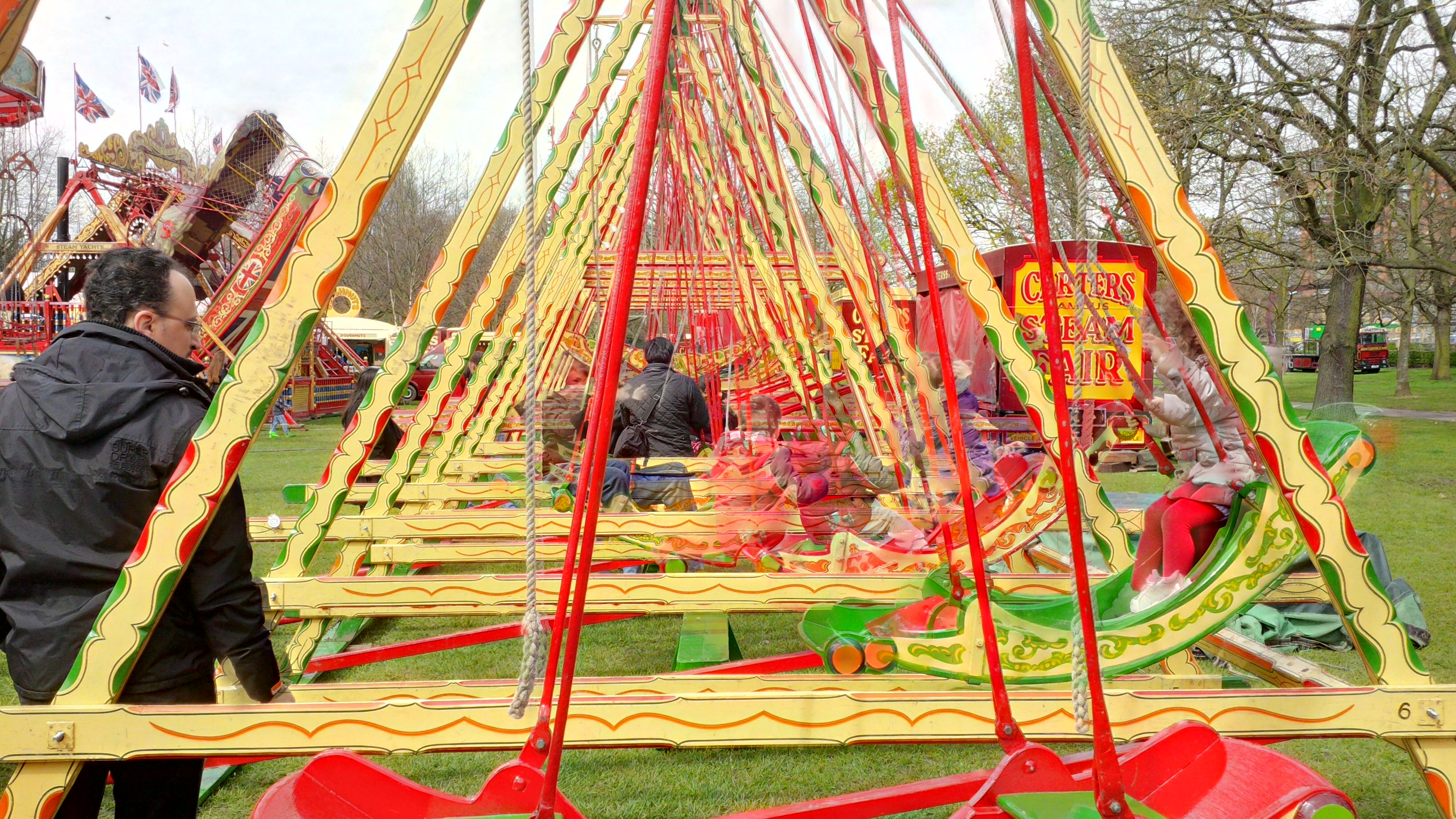
201604101256 Chelmsford Central Park Carters Steam Fair Swingboats

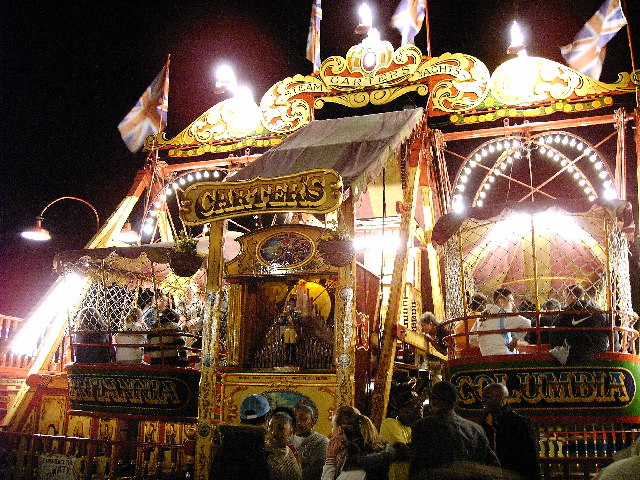
Steam Boats aka Steam Yachts at Prospect Park

Carters Steam Fair was a travelling collection of rare working funfair rides, In April 2016, the touring rides with the Fair were:

Ride	Height Restriction
Austin Cars	Suitable for pre-school children up to the age of about 6 or 7 only
Train Ride	There are no height restrictions, so adults may travel with younger children, if required
Toytown	Suitable for toddlers and pre-school children up to the age of 5 or 6
Mini Octopus	Suitable for toddlers and pre-school children up to the age of 5 or 6
Scenic Dobbies	Suitable for toddlers and pre-school children up to the age of 5 or 6
Big Swingboats	Must be over 1.1 metres (3.6 feet) tall to ride
Little Swingboats	No
Jubilee Steam Gallopers	No
Jungle Thriller Ark	No
Chair-o-Plane	Must be over 1.1 metres (3.6 feet) tall to ride
Steam Yachts	Must be over 1.05 metres (3.4 feet) tall to ride middle yellow seats, all other seats may be ridden by anyone over 1.2 metres (3.9 feet)
Dive-Bomber	Must be over 1.1 metres (3.6 feet) tall only when accompanied by an adult, or those over 1.3 meters (4.2 feet) unaccompanied
Giant Octopus	Must be over 1.1 metres (3.6 feet) tall to ride
Dodgems	Must be over 1.1 metres (3.6 feet) tall to ride
Autodrome	No

On their last tour in August 2022, they travelled with the following rides:

Ride	Height Restriction
Austin Cars	Suitable for pre-school children up to the age of about 6 or 7 only
Train Ride	There are no height restrictions, so adults may travel with younger children, if required
Toytown	Suitable for toddlers and pre-school children up to the age of 5 or 6
Mini Octopus	Suitable for toddlers and pre-school children up to the age of 5 or 6
Big Swingboats	Must be over 1.1 metres (3.6 feet) tall to ride
Little Swingboats	No
Jubilee Steam Gallopers	No
Mini Boat Ride	No
Chair-o-Plane	Must be over 1.1 metres (3.6 feet) tall to ride
Steam Yachts	Must be over 1.05 metres (3.4 feet) tall to ride middle yellow seats, all other seats may be ridden by anyone over 1.2 metres (3.9 feet). You must be able to hold on, as there are no safety bars.
Super Skid	Yes
Giant Octopus	Must be over 1.1 metres (3.6 feet) tall to ride
Dodgems	Must be over 1.1 metres (3.6 feet) tall to ride

== Switch from cash to tokens ==
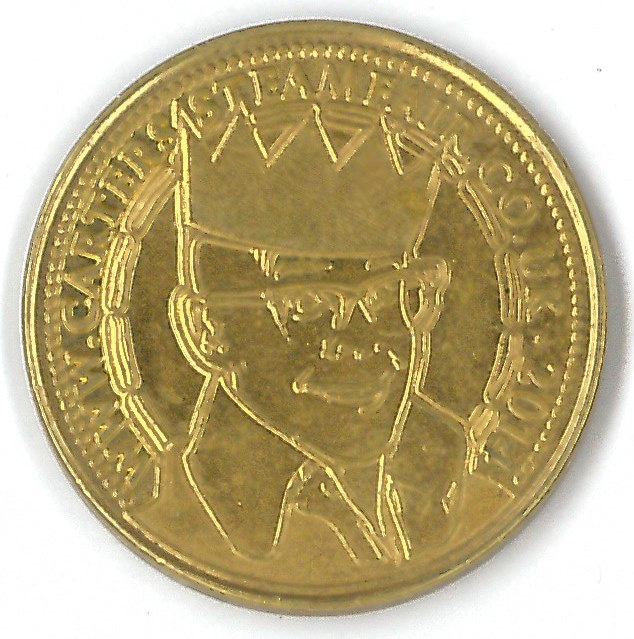
Harry Hill, as depicted on the Carters Steam Fair 2015 issue coin token

In 2014, Carters Steam Fair moved from taking cash payments at each attraction to a token coin system. By April 2016, there were two distinct minting productions featuring different designs. Both designs depict a Galloper ride horse on the reverse, with the texts "Carters Steam Fair", "No cash value", and "No refund value" around the image on the coin's edge. The text "1 Token" appears across the horse's neck horizontally in a rectangular box. All text is in block letters.

2014 token obverse

The obverse of the 2014 coin token depicts the comedian Harry Hill, wearing a paper Christmas cracker hat. Hill was to design the image, but he agreed for Carters to use his portrait as he was too busy.

2015 token obverse

The obverse of the 2015 coin token depicts Carters Steam Fair's founder John Carter, who in 1977 with his wife Anna purchased the Steam Gallopers.

== In popular culture ==
=== Models ===
A number of die-cast models featuring the name of and / or reproducing vehicles used by Carters Steam Fair have been produced;

- Corgi Toys released a limited edition Morris 1000 in 1995 as part of their Corgi Classics range, named "Advanced Publicity Van Set: Carters Steam Fair", in 1:43 scale. 14,300 were produced and distributed worldwide. This model came with a ‘Seafood Stall Kit’.
- Oxford Diecast released a Morris J San Remo Ice Cream Van during 2014, registration "WLD 759", based on the Carters full-size vehicle, and in 1:76 scale.

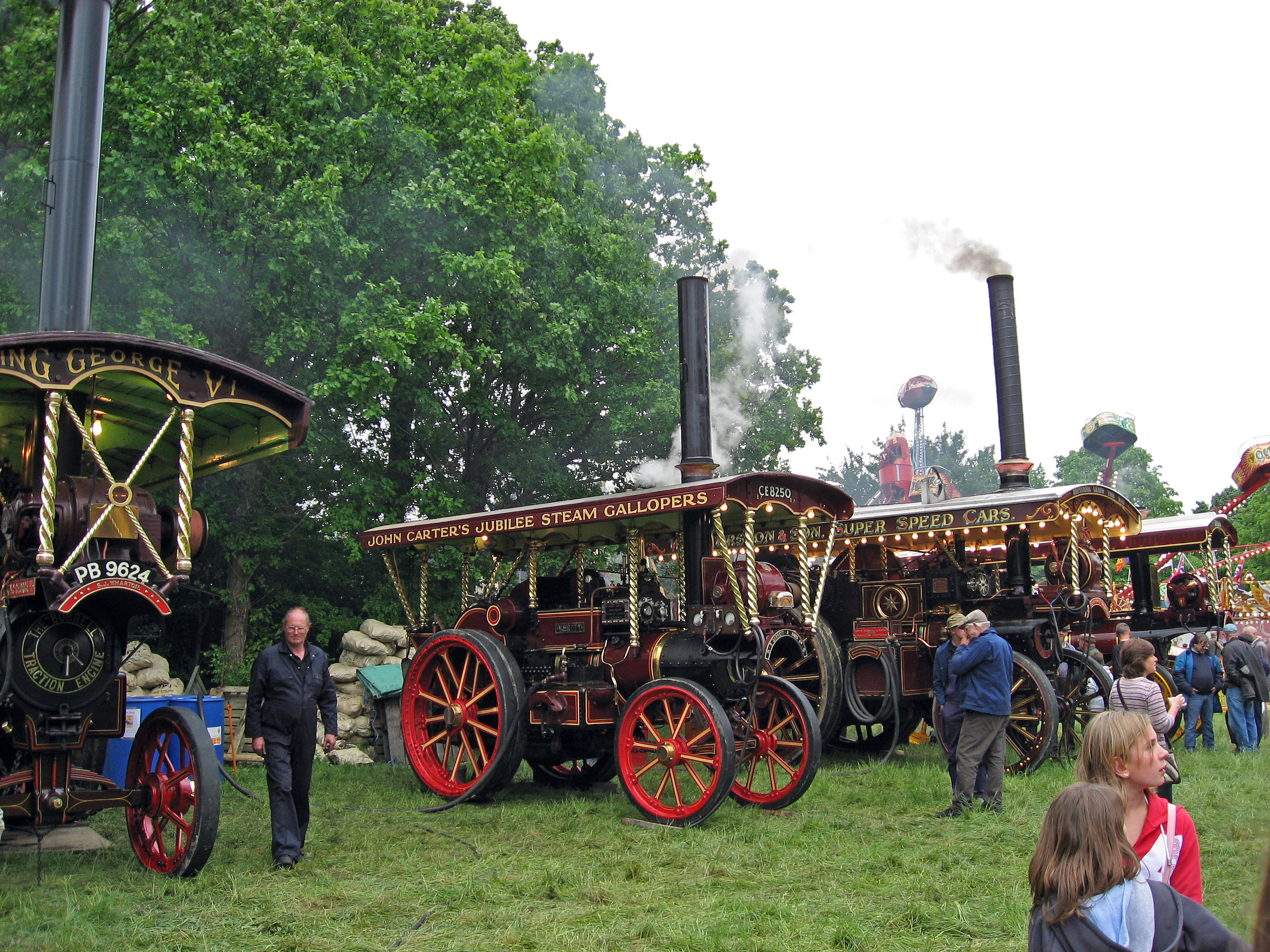
A line-up of showman's engines, Pinkney's Green (May 2007)

=== Television ===
- Antiques Roadshow, Series 29, Episode 2 (BBC, 2006)
- Fairground Attractions (Channel 5 Broadcasting Ltd, 2014)
- Midsomer Murders (ITV, 2015)
- Great British Railway Journeys, Series 7, Episode 20
- Worzel Gummidge, BBC Series, 2019

=== Film ===
External audio
- Audio soundscape of Carters Steam Fair
- Carters Steam Fair visits Hersham in Surrey: among the general background hubbub, rock'n'roll plays on a waltzer ride while a barrel organ plays in front of a dive-bomber ride. retrieved 23 June 2010

The Fair has been featured in many films including;

- Hugo
- The Krays
- 28 Days Later
- The End of the Affair
- 28 Weeks Later
- The Theory of Everything
- Paddington 2
- Rocketman

=== Music ===
The Kaiser Chiefs' Meanwhile Up in Heaven music video was filmed on the fair in 2014.

== See also ==
- List of steam fairs
- Showman
- Travelling funfair
- Musée des Arts Forains (The Funfair Museum), in Paris, France
