= Archaos =

French circus

Archaos (Cirque Archaos) is a French contemporary circus created by Pierrot Bidon in 1986. It began as an alternative, theatrical circus without animals, featuring dangerous stunts like chainsaw juggling, fire breathing, wall of death, etc. The company is considered a pioneer of the contemporary circus. Today, Archaos is based in Marseille, France, and is a designated Pôle National des Arts du Cirque. Archaos is also the main organiser of the Biennale Internationale des Arts du Cirque, the world's largest contemporary circus festival.

== History ==
Archaos found fame in the UK through Pierrot's association with Adrian Evans, who promoted the company there. Shows included Chapiteau des Cordes, Bouinax, BX91 and Metal Clown. Archaos sold out for 12 weeks on Clapham Common in 1990, following a UK tour. The 1991 tour of Metal Clown encountered financial difficulties after the tent was destroyed by gales in Tallaght, Dublin. This, and a number of artistic differences, led to the demise of Archaos. A number of British artists who trained with the company have gone on to pursue careers in the entertainment industry, with companies such as Mischief La-Bas and Flambeaux & The P-Cult.

Archaos also helped reinvigorate the existing UK New Circus movement, spawning companies like Mamaloucos (formed in 1996), who went on to collaborate with the Royal National Theatre.

In September 2010, an exhibition in London displayed the Archaos archive of films, photos, audio, etc. Ex-members travelled from all over the world to be at the five-day event. The exhibition was held in memory of Archaos founder, Pierrot Bidon, who died earlier in the year. The obituary in The Guardian celebrating Bidon's life noted that Archaos was "one of the ensembles that galvanised the new circus movement, in which traditional arts have been re-imagined and combined with contemporary artistic sensibilities and theatrical techniques."

A website hosting an archive of Archaos is online. www.archaos.info

Most recently, Archaos was nominated for the Best Producer award for the L'Entre-Deux Biennales project at the 2016 Annual International Professional Circus Awards in Sochi, Russia. Archaos was also chosen to present performances at the Club France that was held during the Rio Olympics in August 2016.

== Biennale Internationale des Arts du Cirque ==
Archaos took a major role in the Circus in Capitals project that was part of Marseille Provence 2013 and the experience inspired the company to create the first Biennale Internationale des Arts du Cirque. The first edition was held in the Aix Marseille Provence Metropolis and across the Provence Alpes Côte d'Azur region in 2015. With more than 50 international companies and close to 100,000 spectators, the Biennale quickly established itself as the largest circus festival in the world. The second Biennale will be held in early 2017 in more than 30 cities in Provence.

== Major acts created ==
- The tent ropes (1987)
- The last show on earth (1989)
- Bouinax (1990)
- BX 91 and Archaos1 + Archaos2 (1991)
- Metal Clown (1991)
- DJ 92 (1992)
- Game Over 1 (1995)
- Game Over 2 (1997)
- Parade (1998)
- Just For (1999)
- In Vitro or the legend of the Clones (1999)
- Jewel (2002)
- Margo (2003)
- Anatom (2004)
- Parallel 26 (2006)
- In Vitro 09 (2009)

== Awards ==
- In 1989, Archaos was honoured with the 'Best of the Fringe' award at the Edinburgh Fringe Festival, for their work as one of the most innovative and daring artistic companies in Britain.
- In 1989 in France, the Grand Prix National Circus was presented by the Minister of Culture.
- In 1991 Archaos was nominated for the Metal Clown the award for best show of the year in Britain.
