= Contemporary circus =

Style of circus developed in the 20th century

Contemporary circus (or cirque contemporain in French-speaking countries) is a contested term in circus studies. In this article, it is used in contrast to the term 'traditional circus', combining with the genre elsewhere disambiguated as new circus or nouveau cirque. Many circus scholars prefer to separate these styles, as elaborated in circus. Contemporary circus, by this definition, is a genre of performing arts developed in the late 20th century in which a story, theme, mood or question is conveyed through traditional circus skills. Traditional circus skills are blended with more choreographic, character-driven or mechanical approaches. Animals are rarely used, akin to variety shows.

Contemporary circus —encompassing the New Circus movement—originated in the late 1960s, and has spurred the creation of unique schools to teach the format, as well as books for the contemporary circus performer, assisting them with their careers.

== Contemporary circus ==
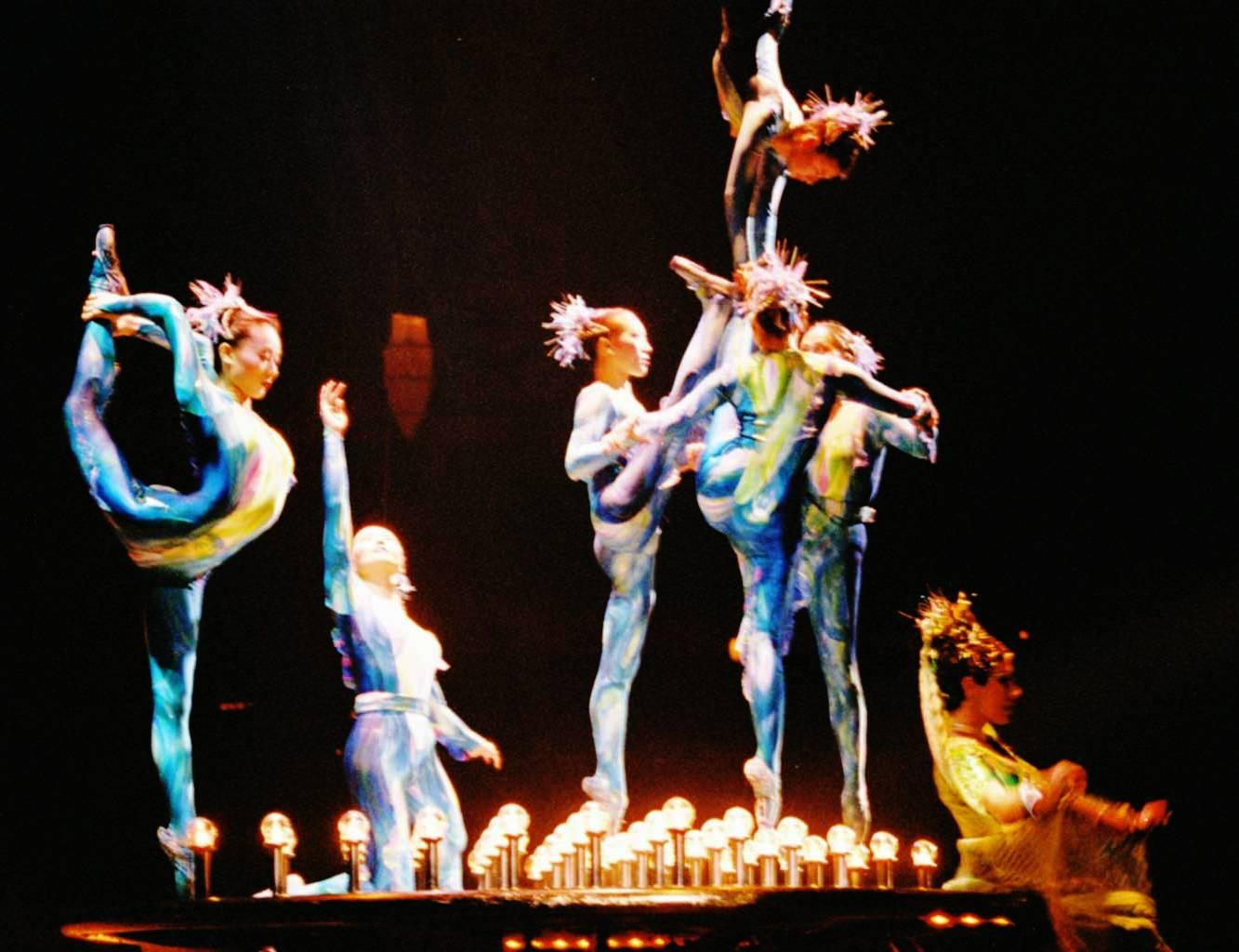
Cirque du Soleil performing Dralion in Vienna, 2004

The new circus or nouveau cirque movement originated in Australia, the West Coast of the United States, France and the United Kingdom from the early 1970s to the mid-1980s. The impetus came from the "new wave" theatre movement and street theatre as well as from traditional circus.

Early pioneers of the new circus genre included: The Royal Lichtenstein Quarter-Ring Sidewalk Circus, founded in San Jose, CA in 1969 by Nick Weber, SJ; Circus Oz, forged in Australia in 1977 from SoapBox Circus (1976) and New Circus (1973); the Pickle Family Circus, founded in San Francisco in 1975; Ra-Ra Zoo in 1984 in London; Nofit State Circus in 1984 from Wales; Cirque du Soleil, founded in Quebec in 1984; Cirque Plume and Archaos from France in 1984 and 1986 respectively. More recent examples include: Cirque Éloize (founded in Quebec in 1993); Sweden's Cirkus Cirkör (1995); Teatro ZinZanni (founded in Seattle in 1998); the West African Circus Baobab (late 1990s); and Montreal's Les 7 doigts de la main (founded in 2002). The genre includes other circus troupes such as the Vermont-based Circus Smirkus (founded in 1987 by Rob Mermin) and Le Cirque Imaginaire (later renamed Le Cirque Invisible, both founded and directed by Victoria Chaplin, daughter of Charlie Chaplin).

It could be argued that the blending of traditional circus arts with contemporary aesthetic sensibilities and theatrical techniques has expanded the general public's interest in and appetite for the circus. Certainly the most conspicuous success story has been that of Cirque du Soleil, the Canadian circus company whose estimated annual revenue now exceeds US$810 million, and whose nouveau cirque shows have been seen by nearly 90 million spectators in over 200 cities on five continents.

The genre of contemporary circus is largely considered to have begun in 1995 with 'Le Cri du Caméléon', an ensemble performance from the graduating class of the French circus school Le Centre Nationale des Artes du Cirque (CNAC), directed by Joseph Nadj. In contrast to New Circus, Contemporary Circus (as a genre) tends to avoid linear narrative in favour of more suggestive, interdisciplinary approaches to abstract concepts. This includes a strong trend for developing new apparatus and movement languages based on the capacities, experience and interests of individual performers, rather than finding new ways to present traditional repertoire.

== Characteristics ==
Contemporary circus sometimes combines traditional circus skills and theatrical techniques to convey a story or theme. Such acts may include acrobatics, juggling, aerial arts, acting, comedy, magic, music, and other elements. Contemporary circus productions may often be staged in theaters or in outdoor tents. Music is often composed exclusively for the production, and aesthetic influences are drawn as much from contemporary culture as from circus tradition. Animal acts appear less frequently in contemporary circus than in traditional circus. Theatrical scenes or clown gags may provide seamless segues between acts instead of using the traditional role of the ringmaster.

Below is a table comparing several aspects of traditional and contemporary circus performances. It should be remembered though, that creating dichotomies is reductive, and there are many instances of circus productions that do not easily fit such neat categorisation.

	Traditional circus	Contemporary circus
Typically performed by	Circus families	Conservatory or self-trained artists
Typical staging format	Tiered seating around an oval or circular arena called a ring, under a large tent called the big top	Auditorium seating in front of proscenium stage, in the round, under a tent, in the streets, or other spaces
Typical production format	Series of spectacle-oriented acts presided over by a ringmaster, who has a role similar to a master of ceremonies	Series of theatrical, character-driven acts tied together by a central narrative or abstract theme.
Typical music	Uptempo marches, waltzes, etc. Music's purpose is to raise the energy level and create a sense of spectacle.	A variety of genres and moods. Music also assists in dramatizing the show's themes, characters, and/or narrative.

"Extreme circus" is a high-energy, street-inspired genre of contemporary circus whose aesthetic is more free-form and improvisational; its music may encompass hip hop, virtuosic percussion and beat-boxing.

== Social circus ==
The social circus tradition of community training and sharing of skills sits alongside contemporary circus genres as much as it does classical.

== See also ==
- Circus school
