= Brewing in Vermont =

U.S. state beer production

Vermont ranks first nationally in craft breweries per capita.

The U.S. state of Vermont is home to over 100 breweries, microbreweries, nanobreweries, and brewpubs that produce a wide variety of beer.

In 2011, 2012, and 2014, the Brewers Association ranked Vermont as the state with the greatest number of breweries per capita. Using the 2010 US Census population estimate of 625,741 and 26 breweries, there is one brewery for every 24,067 people.

The 2012 Brewers Association Economic Impact Report shows Vermont with a total economic impact of beer brewed by craft brewers at $196,287,000. The data places Vermont as third in the category of craft beer industry output per adult (21+) with $418.57 per person. The report states that there are 2,200 full-time employees with an average wage of $30,176.

When using the economic impact of beer as a percentage of GDP, Vermont ranks fourth with a percentage of 2.40% for 2012.

== History ==
The history of beer in Vermont is similar to its history in the rest of the United States – no local breweries existed from the late 1800s when Vermont passed its own local prohibition laws, several decades prior to national Prohibition, until the microbrewery explosion of the 1980s and 1990s. Since then a number of strong breweries have developed despite Vermont's small population.

=== Pre-Prohibition ===
On November 2, 1798, Vermont passed a law which began restricting sales of strong beer, ale, and cider. This law was eventually overturned on November 10, 1814. However, the temperance movement remained very strong in Vermont.

In 1840, tax statistics published by Zadock Thompson show there were one brewery in Vermont producing 12,800 gallons of beer. This brewery was operated in Burlington and went by the name of Burlington Brewery. In 1840, the brewery was completely destroyed when an arson set fire to numerous downtown buildings. The Burlington Brewery was rebuilt and fully operational by late 1841.

In 1844, a law was passed which set brewing license fees and appointed county commissioners to approve each license. In 1846, a provision was passed by the legislature to allow a "local option" to whether grant or deny these licenses. This meant the citizens of the towns could vote on whether to allow or disallow these establishments. In 1850, town selectmen became authorized to approve business license to sell small beer or cider, but not strong beer. In 1852, several more laws were passed which started Vermont's prohibition era. In 1853, the legislature passed the Vermont Prevention of Traffic in Intoxicating Liquors for the Purpose of Drinking law.

Licenses published in the Burlington Free Press of January 1863 show only one licensed brewer within Vermont.

In 1877, Internal Revenue records show two breweries, one liquor establishment, and 433 saloons. In 1887, the Boston Journal reported that "Vermont seems to be the nearest place to paradise for prohibitionists. There is not a brewery in the state."

Vermont hop production took off around 1840 and peaked in 1860. In 1840, Vermont produced 48,137 pounds of hops, 292,023 pounds in 1850, 638,657 pounds in 1860, and 527,927 pounds in 1870. Around 1900, there were around 4,400 pounds produced. By 1910, hops production had been reduced to near zero.

On January 16, 1919, the 18th Amendment (Federal Prohibition) which outlawed the manufacture, transportation, and sale of alcohol was passed by 3/4 of US states and became law.

=== Post-Prohibition ===
On December 5, 1933 Federal Prohibition came to an end. In 1935, two alcoholics from Vermont, Bill Wilson, from East Dorset, and Bob Smith, from St. Johnsbury, started Alcoholics Anonymous with a twelve-step program.

In 1988, after spending three years lobbying the Vermont legislature to legalize brewpubs, Greg Noonan opened the first brewpub in Vermont, the Vermont Pub & Brewery. On the 25th anniversary of the Vermont Pub & Brewery, the city of Burlington dedicated a plaque commemorating Noonan at the front of the pub.

In 1997 Wolaver's Fine Organic Ales became the first certified organic brewery in the United States. In 2014, Wolaver's (now owned by Otter Creek Brewing Company) became the first non-GMO certified brewery in Vermont.

Due to proximity, distribution, and availability of beer produced by these three brewers, the town of Waterbury was named the Best Beer Town in New England by the Boston Globe in 2012.

== Beer regulations and laws ==
Within Vermont statutes, beer is defined as a "malt beverage" containing "not less than one percent nor more than 16 percent of alcohol by volume at 60 degrees Fahrenheit." An exception to the law provides that any beverage with an alcohol content of "more than six percent and has a terminal specific gravity of less than 1.009" which is considered a spirit and not a malt beverage.

A "specialty beer" is defined as a malt beverage that contains "more than eight percent alcohol and not more than 16 percent alcohol by volume at 60 degrees Fahrenheit".

Holders of first and third class licenses may sell malt beverages between the hours of 8:00 a.m. and 2:00 a.m. the next morning. Holders of second class licenses may sell malt between the hours of 6:00 a.m. and 12:00 a.m. the next morning.

A person may import or transport not more than six gallons of malt or vinous beverages providing it is not for resale.

It is illegal to serve more than 32 ounces of beer at a time which prevents sales of normal 64 oz pitchers of beer.

== Beer styles ==
=== Black IPA ===
Greg Noonan, owner and head brewer of The Vermont Pub & Brewery, and Glenn Walter, then an assistant brewer, are cited with creating the Black IPA (AKA Cascadian Dark Ale, India Black Ale, or Vermont Porter) with the initial brewing of Blackwatch IPA on December 4, 1994. The Blackwatch IPA second brewing was November 25, 1995, where Noonan was assisted by John Kimmich, who is now the owner and brewer of The Alchemist. This beer inspired John Kimmich's (The Alchemist) El Jefe Black IPA (2003) and Shaun Hill's (then Shed Restaurant & Brewery) Darkside Black IPA and later Hill Farmstead's James. Mitch Steele, head brewer of Stone Brewing Co., states the Darkside Black IPA was the inspiration for Stone's Sublimely Self Righteous Ale.

=== Vermont IPA ===
The Alchemist, Hill Farmstead Brewery, and Lawson's Finest Liquids have created a loosely named beer India Pale Ale (IPA) category called "East Coast IPAs" or "New England IPAs".

In 2012, Jeff Baker wrote "The Case for the Vermont IPA." In 2013, Gary Dzen of the Boston Globe called the style "East Coast IPAs", but noted that Vermont "brewers have started something of their own IPA revolution, helping to loosely create the category of 'East Coast IPAs'. While these beers can be as bitter as their counterparts out west, they're generally less so, focusing on aromatics and perceived bitterness rather than actual pucker-factor. These brews are heavily dry-hopped and lighter on the palate, forgoing malt sweetness for levity in the quest for balance." In 2014, Jeff Baker restated his case, saying Vermont IPAs are "bright golden and hazy (unfiltered typically) in appearance, soft in mouthfeel, dense with hop flavor and aroma, yet restrained in bitterness allowing for balance to occur between the hops and the malt."

== Beers ==
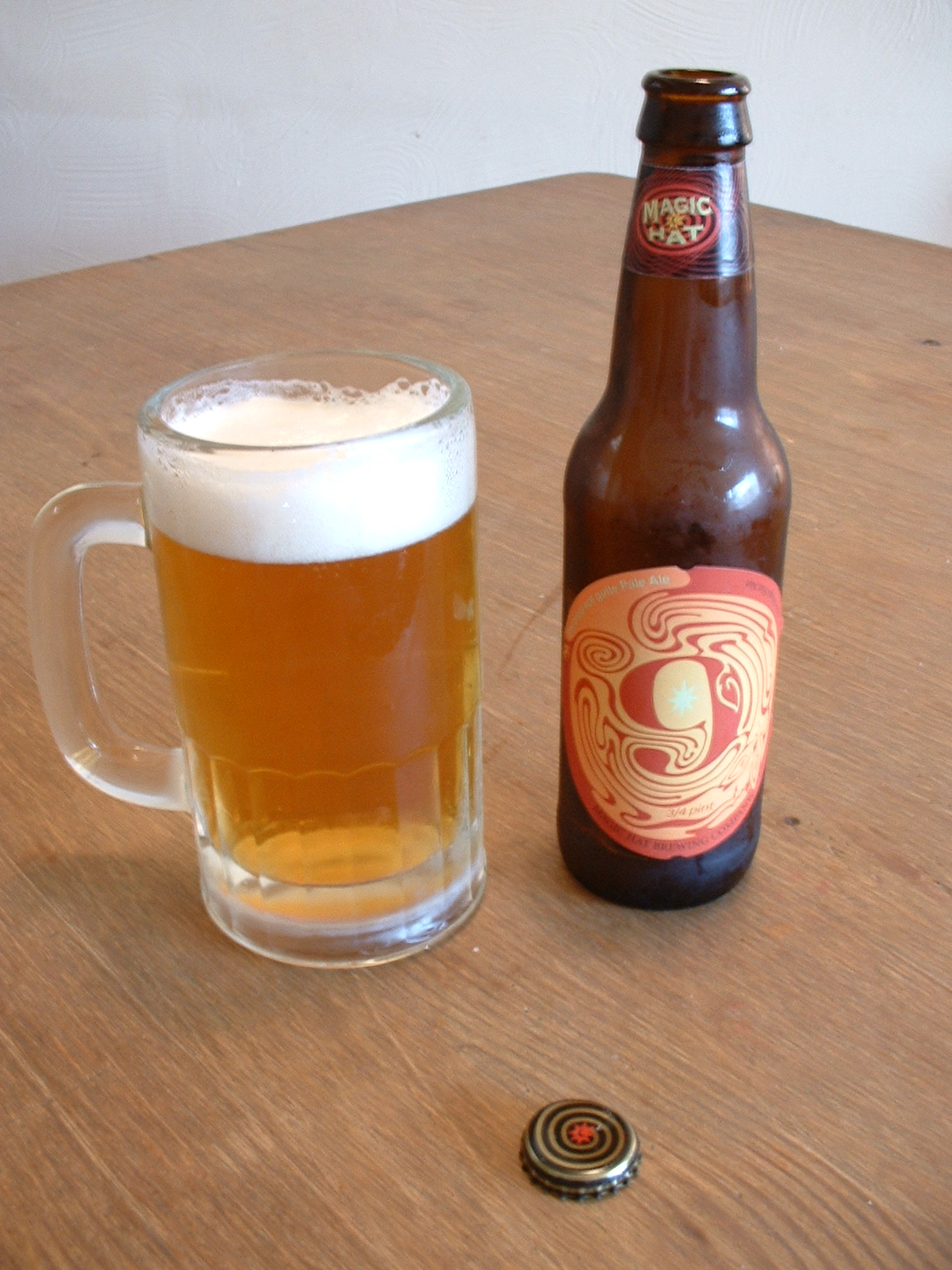
Magic Hat Brewing Company's #9 in a mug

One of the most widely known beers from Vermont is #9 from Magic Hat Brewing Company. #9 is an apricot-flavored fruit beer based on a traditional pale ale.

Heady Topper from The Alchemist was only sold in Vermont for many years, but began distributing in the northeast in the mid-2010s. Heady Topper is a double India Pale Ale and is one of the highest rated beers on both BeerAdvocate and RateBeer.

Other beers, such as Hill Farmstead's Edward and Abner and Lawson's Finest Liquids Double Sunshine IPA, have gained national acclaim.

== Breweries ==
As of July 2019, there were 104 operating production breweries and brewpubs operating in Vermont.

Two Vermont brewers have been awarded the Brewers Association Russell Schehrer Award for Innovation in Craft Brewing. Steve Parkes, owner of the American Brewers Guild and Drop-In Brewery in Middlebury, won the award in 2009. Greg Noonan, owner of Vermont Pub & Brewery, won the award in 2005.

In 1996, Jigger Hill Brewery, which used the "Tunbridge Quality Ales" brand name, was opened by Liz Trott and her partner Janice Moran. Trott became the first female head brewer in Vermont and the first Vermont brewer to distribute bottle conditioned beer. This was also the first woman-owned, lesbian-owned brewery in Vermont, and one of the first within the United States. In 2000, the partners helped reformulate and re-launch Gay Pride Beer for J. Lewis Company. In May 2002, the brewery closed due to one of the partners' health complications.

In 2011, Hill Farmstead Brewery was named the 2011 Best New Brewer in the World by RateBeer.

In 2013, Hill Farmstead Brewery was named the 2013 Best Brewery in the World, Best Brewery in Vermont, and Best Brewery in New England by RateBeer. Additionally, Alchemist Heady Topper was named the Best Beer in Vermont for 2012.

In 2014, Hill Farmstead Brewery was named the 2014 Best Brewery in Vermont, Alchemist Heady Topper was named the 2014 Best Beer in Vermont, and Lost Nation Brewery was named the 2014 Best New Brewery in Vermont.

In 2015, Hill Farmstead Brewery was named the Best Brewery in the World by RateBeer.

The Alchemist, Hill Farmstead, and Lawson's Finest Liquids have become so popular that the route that leads between the three breweries is called the IPA Highway and is a popular destination for beer enthusiasts.

=== Craft breweries ===
According to the Vermont Brewers Association, as of July 2024, there were 56 breweries operating in Vermont that could be described as craft breweries.

- 14th Star Brewery – St. Albans
- 1st Republic Brewing Co – Essex
- Alchemist Brewery – Waterbury
- Bent Hill Brewery-Braintree Hill
- Black Flannel Brewing Co.-Essex Junction
- Bobcat Cafe and Brewery-Bristol
- Brocklebank Craft Brewing-Tunbridge
- Burlington Beer Company-Burlington
- Dirt Church Brewing Co.- East Haven
- Drop-In Brewing Company – Middlebury
- Farm Road Brewing- Bennington
- Foam Brewers-Burlington
- Fiddlehead Brewing – Shelburne
- Foley Brothers Brewing – Brandon
- Four Quarters Brewing-Winooski
- Freak Folk Bier - Waterbury
- Frost Beer Works- Hinesburg
- Good Measure Pub and Brewery-Northfield
- GoodWater Brewery-Williston
- Harpoon Brewery – headquartered in Boston, Massachusetts, largest plant in Windsor
- Hill Farmstead Brewery – Greensboro Bend
- Hired Hand Brewing Company-Vergennes
- Hogback Mountain Brewing- Starksboro
- House of Fermentology-Burlington
- Idletyme Brewing Company- Stowe
- Jasper Murdock's Alehouse- Norwich
- Kickback Brewery-Westford
- Kingdom Brewing – Newport Center (new brewery as of 2012, independent of the old Kingdom Brewers)
- Kraemer and Kin-Alburgh
- Lawson's Finest Liquids – Warren
- Long Trail Brewing Company – Bridgewater Corners
- Lost Nation Brewing – Morrisville (May 2013)
- Lucy and Howe Brewing Company-Jericho
- Madison Brewing Company- Bennington
- Mill River Brewing- St. Albans
- Outer Limits Brewing- Proctorsville
- Prohibition Pig- Waterbury
- Queen City Brewing-Burlington
- Red Barn Brewing-Danville
- Red Clover Ale Co.- Brandon
- River Roost Brewery- White River Junction
- Rock Art Brewery – Morrisville
- Rutland Beer Works- Rutland
- Simple Roots Brewing-Burlington
- Soulmate Brewing Company- Morrisville
- Stone Corral Brewery-Richmond
- Switchback Brewery – Burlington
- Ten Bends Beer-Hyde Park
- Tropic Brewing-Waterbury
- Two Heroes-South Hero
- Upper Pass Beer Company-South Royalton
- Vermont Beer Makers-Bennington
- Vermont Pub and Brewery- Burlington
- von Trapp Brewing – Stowe
- Weird Window Brewing-South Burlington
- Whetstone Beer Co.- Brattleboro
- Whirlgig Brewing- St. Johnsbury
- Wunderkammer Bier. - Wolcott
- Zero Gravity Craft Brewery- Burlington

=== Former Breweries ===
- Backacre Beermakers – Weston
- Covered Bridge Brewing – Lyndonville
- Grateful Hands Brewing – Cabot
- Magic Hat Brewing Company – South Burlington – owned by North American Breweries, Rochester, New York Brewed in Rochester, NY, brewing site now owned by Zero Gravity.
- McNeill's Brewery – Brattleboro
- Northshire Brewery – Bennington
- Otter Creek Brewing – Middlebury, Bridgewater (also produced Wolaver's Certified Organic Ales brand (ceased 2015) and the Shed brand) brewery closed, brand still produced by Harpoon’s employee owned Mass. Bay Brewing Company.
- Ammi F. Stone Brewery (pre-prohibition brewer)
- Black River Brewing
- Bennington Brewers
- Burlington Brewery (pre-prohibition brewer)
- Catamount Brewing
- Franklin County Brewery
- Gallagher’s Tavern & Brewery
- Golden Dome Brewing
- Grateful Hands Brewing
- Hart’s Bend Brewery
- Hermit Thrush Brewing
- Jigger Hill Brewery (Tunbridge Quality Ales)
- Kingdom Brewers Kross Brewing
- Maple Leaf Malt & Brewing
- Rattlesnake Cafe
- Ruben James Restaurant & Brewery (restaurant open, not brewing beer)
- Saint J Brewery
- Salt Ash Inn (B&B still open, not brewing beer)
- Shed Restaurant & Brewery (beer still brewed by Harpoon)
- Stonecutters Brewhouse
- Thirsty Bull Brewpub
- Three Needs Brewery & Taproom (taproom open, not brewing beer)
- Trout River Brewing – Bennington (Now brewed by Vermont Beer Makers)
- Vermont Beer Company
- West Mountain
- Windham Brewery

== Brewers Association ==
In May 1995, the Vermont Brewers Association was founded in order to promote Vermont beer through marketing and festivals, watch the Vermont legislature, and foster an air of camaraderie and mutual cooperation among brewers.

== See also ==
- Beer in the United States
- List of breweries in the United States
- List of microbreweries
