= Alchemy (disambiguation) =

Alchemy was an early protoscientific practice. It may also refer to:

== Regional forms ==
- Alchemy and chemistry in medieval Islam
- Chinese alchemy
- Indian alchemy, or Rasayana

== Entertainment and literature ==
- Alchemy (comics), a Marvel character
- Alchemy (video game), a 2001 video game by PopCap Games
- Alchemy (novel), a 2004 novel by Margaret Mahy
- Doctor Alchemy, a DC Comics super-villain
- Alchemy (film), 2005 film

=== Music ===
==== Albums ====
- Alchemy (Disclosure album), 2023
- Alchemy (Leah Andreone album), 1998
- Alchemy (Richard Lloyd album), 1979
- Alchemy (Third Ear Band album), 1969
- Alchemy (Yngwie Malmsteen album), 1999
- Alchemy: An Index of Possibilities, by David Sylvian, 1985
- Alchemy: Dire Straits Live, 1984
- Alchemy, by Au5, 2020

==== Songs ====
- "Alchemy", by Hawkwind, from Distant Horizons, 1997
- "Alchemy", by Above & Beyond, from Group Therapy, 2011
- "Alchemy", by Maxïmo Park, from Risk to Exist, 2017
- "Alchemy", by Joe Jackson, from Fool, 2019
- "Alchemy", by Starset, from Horizons, 2021
- "The Alchemy", by Taylor Swift, from The Tortured Poets Department, 2024

==== Record labels ====
- Alchemy Records (Japan), a label run by Jojo Hiroshige of the group Hijokaidan
- Alchemy Records (U.S.), a 1980s label co-founded by Mark Deutrom

=== Television ===
- "Alchemy" (Eureka), an episode of Eureka
- Alchemy (Fullmetal Alchemist), an ability in the Fullmetal Alchemist manga/anime series

== Hardware and software ==
- Alchemy (Adobe), Adobe software project
- Alchemy (processor), a series of embedded processors originally from Alchemy Semiconductor, later owned by multiple other semiconductor companies
- Sometimes used as shortcut for SQLAlchemy, an object-relational mapper for the Python programming language
- AlchemyAPI, a company that uses machine learning to do natural language processing

== Other ==
- Alchemy (event), a regional Burning Man event in La Fayette, Georgia, US
- Alchemy (company), a defunct film production company previously known as Millennium Entertainment

== See also ==
- Alchemist (disambiguation)
- Alchemiya, a streaming service geared towards Muslims
- Alchemax, a fictional corporation
