= Greensboro (disambiguation) =

Greensboro is a city in North Carolina, U.S.

Greensboro may also refer to:

- Greensboro, Alabama
- Greensboro, Florida
- Greensboro, Georgia
- Greensboro, Indiana
- Greensboro Township, Henry County, Indiana, which contains the town
- Greensboro, Maryland
- Greensboro, Pennsylvania
- Greensboro, Vermont, a New England town
  - Greensboro (CDP), Vermont, the central village in the town
- Greensboro station (Washington Metro)
- USS Greensboro (PF-101), a United States Navy patrol frigate in commission from 1945 to 1946

== See also ==
- Greensborough (disambiguation)
