= Totally Circus =

- Logo
- Created by: Circus Smirkus
- Starring: Ozzie Henchel; Rob Mermin; Case Conover; Olivia Oller; Ian Caldwell; Hyla Gayer; Dylan Fuller; Dasha Sergatchiova; Callie Fentress; Ben Reynolds; Alex Friedlander-Moore; Jacob Skeffington
- Country of origin: United States
- Original language: English
- No. of seasons: 1
- No. of episodes: 15

Production
- Running time: 22 minutes

Original release
- Network: Disney Channel
- Release: June 16 – September 24, 2000

Totally Circus is a 30-minute children's reality television series that aired on Disney Channel. It premiered June 16, 2000, and ended on September 24, 2000.

== Episodes ==
1. "Tryouts!" – 6/16/2000
2. "Totally Tired Troupers!" – 6/18/2000
3. "Totally Anxious!" – 6/25/2000
4. "Totally Strict!" – 7/2/2000
5. "Totally Terrifying NEW Acts!" – 7/9/2000
6. "Total Identity Crisis!" - 7/16/2000
7. "Totally Hot Temperatures!" – 7/23/2000
8. "Total Rain, Total Pain!" – 8/6/2000
9. "Totally Jealous!" – 8/13/2000
10. "Totally Uplifting!" – 8/20/2000
11. "Totally Backward!" – 8/27/2000
12. "Totally Joking!" – 9/3/2000
13. "Totally Tired!" 9/10/2000
14. "Totally Too Short Summer!" – 9/17/2000
15. "Totally Cheerful, Totally Tearful!" – 9/24/2000
