= Original Clean Energy =

Installer of residential solar power systems

- Company type: Private
- Industry: Solar power
- Founded: 1972; 54 years ago (as iSun); 2024; 2 years ago (as Clean Royalties)
- Headquarters: Waterbury, Vermont, United States
- Revenue: US$100 million (2023)
- Number of employees: 160 (2024)
- Subsidiaries: iSun; SunCommon; Liberty Electric

Original Clean Energy (formerly known as iSun and The Peck Company) is a Vermont-based installer of residential solar power systems. It is headquartered in Waterbury, Vermont.

== History ==
=== Peck Electric/iSun ===
Peck Electric was founded in 1972 by a 2nd-generation family, based in South Burlington, Vermont.

In June 2019, Peck Electric Co. completed a business combination plan with Jensyn Acquisition Corporation, and was renamed to The Peck Company Holdings, Inc., and began trading on the Nasdaq under the symbol "PECK."

In January 2021, The Peck Company acquired iSun Energy LLC, and rebranded itself to iSun.

In June 2024, iSun filed for Chapter 11 bankruptcy protection, citing slumping sales and turmoil as part of the decision. The company planned to keep operating during the proceedings while it tries to find a buyer. Its stock would later be delisted from the Nasdaq soon after. In July 2024, a former iSun executive filed a whistleblower complaint which alleged that the company has committed fraud and misappropriated money.

In August 2024, the company was acquired by Clean Royalties for $10 million. iSun was then split into three independent companies (Legacy Power, SunCommon, and Liberty Electric) with new leadership.

On February 18, 2025, iSun converted their Chapter 11 bankruptcy into a Chapter 7 bankruptcy liquidation.

=== SunCommon ===
SunCommon was co-founded by Duane Peterson and James Moore, originating with the advocacy group Vermont Public Interest Research Group (VPIRG), which in September 2010 started a program to install solar power and hot water systems for homeowners. To meet the demand for clean energy, a new entity was needed that could take in outside capital and scale up, so Duane and James launched SunCommon. SunCommon was officially launched in March 2012 after finding funding via private investment; when it began operations, it had 16 employees and annual revenue of about $2 million. SunCommon installed its 1,000th residential solar system in December 2014, and by late 2016 had reached 2,000 installations, with a workforce of about 100. Its 2015 revenue was about $22 million.

In May 2018, SunCommon expanded into New York after merging with Hudson Solar.

As of March 2020, SunCommon employed 189 people and added over 80 Megawatts of solar to the electric grids of Vermont and New York. This number includes over 8,000 residences and 37 community solar arrays.

== Products ==
=== Residential solar ===
SunCommon installs both roof and ground-mounted systems in both Vermont and New York. As of March 2020, they have installed over 8,000 residential systems.

=== Solar Canopy ===
The Solar Canopy is a unique stand-alone structure with bifacial solar panels. The Solar Canopy comes in single, double, and triple bay sizes and is now offered in both Vermont and New York. The frame is built using sculpted beams from New Energy Works in Rochester, New York. SunCommon Solar Canopies cover the parking lots of notable businesses in Vermont, such as the Hunger Mountain Co-Op and the Alchemist Brewery.

=== Community Solar ===
Community Solar is a new way to be powered by solar energy without having to put solar panels on your home. SunCommon has installed many Community Solar Arrays (CSAs) throughout Vermont and New York. Some of their most notable CSAs are in New York.

==== Orange County Citizens Foundation Community Solar Array ====
The CSA at the Orange County Citizens Foundation (OCCF) in Sugar Loaf, New York hosts solar panels on the foundation's land, capable of powering over 60 area homes and businesses. SunCommon announced a grant to local artists for an outdoor installation near the CSA at the 55-acre Seligmann Center at OCCF. The winners of the grant were Maxine Leu and Michael Asbill. The sculptures double as a shelter and a food source for local wildlife. One of the installations is planted with blackberries and grapes, and the other element is essentially a giant bird feeder.

==== The Pointe of Praise Family Life Center Community Solar Array ====
This CSA in Kingston, New York was built in two phases and has the capacity to serve about 60 households. "The Pointe of Praise church has received panels in exchange for the use of their land to host the array... They are donating 75 percent of their panels to low- and moderate-income seniors in the congregation. Pollinator-friendly vegetation will be planted around the array."

==== Red Hook Community Solar Array ====
In January 2020, SunCommon hosted a ribbon cutting event for their CSA in Red Hook, New York. "The project will power municipal buildings in Tivoli, Red Hook, and local homes. Red Hook officials say this will save the community thousands each year, providing electric bill credits to 270 homes and 16 municipal electric accounts."

==== Columbia County's First Community Solar Array ====
In December 2017, "the New York State Energy Research and Development Authority (NYSERDA) and Hudson Solar (now SunCommon) announced the completion of the first community solar project in Columbia County. This 214 kilowatt CSA is located on one acre... and can accommodate up to 40 customers. The solar system is located in the town of Clermont and will provide environmental benefits by removing about 71 metric tons of CO2 from the atmosphere."

=== Home energy storage ===
SunCommon offers home energy storage in Vermont and New York. The grid-tied solar and battery back-up systems work together to keep the critical loads of a home running during power outages. Homeowners are able to generate clean, automatic, silent back-up power. In February 2019, SunCommon partnered with Vermont's largest utility, Green Mountain Power, to pilot a home energy storage program.

=== Small business & commercial solar ===
SunCommon has helped business owners in every sector, including manufacturing, retail, healthcare, agriculture, office and apartment buildings, hospitality and more, go solar. Some of their most noteworthy commercial installations include:

==== The Alchemist (Stowe, VT) ====
The Alchemist Brewery teamed up with SunCommon in 2018 to build Vermont’s first large-scale solar-covered parking lot. The parking lot holds two large Solar Canopies made up of nearly 400 solar panels, and covers 31 parking spots.

==== Caledonia Spirits (Montpelier, VT) ====
The new Montpelier headquarters of Caledonia Spirits features a roof of solar panels installed by SunCommon.

=== Other product offerings ===
SunCommon also installs Solar Heating & Cooling, as well as Electric Vehicle (EV) Chargers for residences.
