= Circus Smirkus =

International youth circus

- Circus Smirkus

Origin
- Circus name: Circus Smirkus Big Top Tour
- Country: United States
- Founder(s): Rob Mermin
- Year founded: 1987

Information
- Director: Executive & Artistic Director: Rachel Schiffer
- Traveling show?: Yes
- Circus tent?: Yes
- Winter quarters: Greensboro, Vermont, United States
- Website: www.smirkus.org

Circus Smirkus is a non-profit, international youth circus founded in 1987 by Rob Mermin, and based in Greensboro, Vermont.

Smirkus' performers and coaches have come from Canada, China, Colombia, United Kingdom, Ethiopia, France, Georgia, Germany, Hungary, Indonesia, Israel, Italy, Kazakhstan, Latvia, Moldova, Mongolia, the Netherlands, New Zealand, Russia, Sweden, Thailand, Ukraine, Zambia, ten Native American nations and twenty US states. At the International Children's Festival at Wolf Trap National Park for the Performing Arts in September 2000, Circus Smirkus was introduced as "the United Nations of the youth circus world."

== Summer camp ==
Circus Smirkus has a summer camp that trains children in areas such as aerials, clowning/performance, acrobatics and juggling. Participants may also choose to train in other skills such as human pyramids, unicycling and stilt walking. Smirkus Camp opened its Summer 2015 season at new, permanent facilities—a 135-year-old farmhouse, two dormitories, circus tents for training, and Baylin's Balance Barn- on 35 acres (14 ha) in Greensboro, Vermont. The camp sessions offered throughout the season vary from one night overnight camps, one and two-week camps, and advanced camps, including Road Show, Intermediate Skills Intensive, Advanced Individual Acts, and Advanced Ensemble. Smirkus Camp also offers an all ages camp for friends and family at the end of the summer season.

From 1990 to 2010, the circus had more than 4,000 youths aged 10–18 in its summer camps.

Prior to 2016 when Smirkus Camp built its own home in Greensboro, Vermont, the camp moved around and used facilities at places like Bolton Valley Ski Resort, White Mountain School, Sterling College, Lyndon State College, and Burke Mountain Academy.

== Awards and honors ==
- 1992: Vermont Arts Council's Award of Excellence
- 1994: Dove Foundation Award for Family Values
- 1994: Named "one of America's best circuses" by Family Fun Magazine
- 1997: The Bessie Award from Burlington City Arts
- 1998: People's Choice Award at "Circus Youth of Today" Festival in Sweden
- 2000: Dubbed "the United Nations of the youth circus world" by Wolf Trap Foundation for the Performing Arts
- 2004: Smirkus founder Rob Mermin awarded the Lund Family Center's "It Takes a Village" Award
- 2004: Smirkus founder Rob Mermin awarded Vermont Arts Council's Citation of Merit "for distinguished service to the arts in Vermont"
- 2008: Smirkus founder Rob Mermin awarded the Vermont Governor's Award for Excellence in the Arts

== Collaborations ==
1989	Guest troupe from Tbilisi, Georgia.
1990	Historic joint Soviet/American youth circus tour.
1990	Smirkus performed in Yaroslavl and Moscow.
1991	Smirkus was the first circus to perform on the island of Nantucket.
1991	Latvian Youth Circus and Moscow Circus members joined the Smirkus Big Top Tour.
1991	Smirkus co-produced a Soviet/American youth circus-on-ice.
1992	Guest performers from Russia, Moldova and Kazakhstan, and 12 performers from California’s Great Y Circus.
1993	Collaborating with Ringling Bros. and Barnum & Bailey Circus, Russian performers and 10 Native Americans performed with Smirkus.
1994	Guest artists from Russia and Mongolia joined the tour.
1995	Guest performers from Russia, Mongolia and Hungary. Also the first exchange with Budapest Circus School.
1998	Guest performers joined the troupe from Russia, Israel, Mongolia and China. This was Smirkus's first exchange with the Wuqiau School and Chinese Acrobatic Arts Association.
1999	Alberto Zoppe's family from Italy joined the tour, performing with Percheron horses.
1999	Marcel Marceau gave a benefit performance in the Smirkus tent.
2000	Indokids from Indonesia joined the tour.
2000	Smirkus performed with Sesame Street’s Bob McGrath.
2000	Disney Channel broadcast Totally Circus, a fifteen-part documentary about Smirkus.
2001	Collaboration with the Chicago Boyz, and with Chicago’s Midnight Circus.
2001	First Arab-Israeli circus kids from Jerusalem performed in the Smirkus tent as part of a joint peace program.
2001	Julia Child joined the Smirkus Board of Directors as an honorary member after her visit to the Smirkus chuck wagon.
2002	Collaboration with the six-member Vermont bluegrass band, the Route Seven Ramblers, who performed live with the show for the summer tour.
2002	First Nations dancers and cowboy rope spinners from the Southwest joined the tour.
2002	Smirkus Advanced Camp created a road show to tour hospitals and nursing homes.
2003	Performers joined the tour from Sweden’s youth circus troupe Cirkus and Variete.
2004	Volunteers for Peace joined Smirkus with students from Spain, France, England and Poland.
2004	Smirkus was featured on The Martha Stewart Show.
2005	Collaboration with the Sandglass Theater of Putney, Vermont, produced a ringful of puppets, high-flying troupers, and miniature donkeys.
2006	Filmmaker Signe Taylor traveled with the Big Top Tour, shooting for a documentary entitled Circus Dreams which was released five years later in 2011.
2006	Smirkus was featured on Fetch! with Ruff Ruffman.
2007	Guest performers from Colombia and Mongolia joined the tour.
2008	Guest performers from Colombia and Ethiopia joined the tour.
2009	Guest performers from England and France joined the tour.
2017	A trouper from Zambia joined the tour.
2021	A trouper from Zambia joined the tour.

== Notable alumni ==
- Dan Brown, stunt performer for films including Pirates of the Caribbean: At World's End, Letters from Iwo Jima
- Jade Kindar-Martin, highwire walker, holds Guinness World Record for double skywalk across the River Thames in London
- Spencer Novich, eccentric contortionist, bronze medalist at the 2012 Festival Mondial Du Cirque De Demain in Paris
- Molly Saudek, tightwire dancer, silver medalist at the 1998 Festival Mondial Du Cirque De Demain in Paris
- Jacob and Nathaniel Sharpe, diaboloists, performed at 2007 Festival Mondial Du Cirque De Demain in Paris
- John Stork, finalist on Who Wants to Be a Superhero?
- Taylor Wright-Sanson, unicyclist, equilibrist, 2008 winner of Canada's national unicycle competition, the Ottawa Unicycle Invasion
- Ariana Wunderle, tightwire walker, 2022 Guinness World Record for farthest distance walked on a wire in high heels
