= Signe Taylor =

American documentary filmmaker

- Education: Barnard College (BA, 1987); Stanford University (MA, Communication)
- Occupations: Documentary filmmaker, media educator
- Years active: 1992–present
- Known for: Greetings from Iraq, Circus Dreams, It's Criminal
- Awards: Seattle International Film Festival Youth Jury Award; Boston International Film Festival Indie Spec Special Recognition Award

Signe Taylor is an American documentary filmmaker and media educator based in Norwich, Vermont. Her work has received recognition at film festivals including the Chicago International Film Festival, Toronto International Film Festival, Seattle International Film Festival and various others.

== Early life ==
Taylor graduated from Barnard College at Columbia University in 1987 with a Bachelor of Arts degree. She subsequently earned a Master of Arts in Communication from Stanford University's Documentary Film Program. Her Master's project was Greetings From Iraq, which explored the effects of Operation Desert Storm and the international embargo on Iraqi families.

== Career ==
Taylor began her career in media education, collaborating with teenagers on videos addressing social issues such as conflict resolution and substance abuse. She worked as a media educator in Somerville, Massachusetts, produced segments for the PBS children's program ZOOM and directed coverage of political candidates for C-SPAN.

Taylor's directorial debut, Greetings from Iraq (1993), was a 28-minute documentary examining the humanitarian impact of Operation Desert Storm and the international embargo on Iraqi families. Completed while she was a graduate student at Stanford, the film screened at film festivals around the country and aired on public television in 1993.

Taylor's first feature-length documentary, Circus Dreams (2011), followed performers aged 12 to 18 at Circus Smirkus, the only traveling youth circus in the United States, documenting their summer in 2006 during a financial crisis for the organization. The film premiered at the Toronto International Film Festival and was broadcast on PBS in 2012. It received recognition at festivals including the Seattle International Film Festival and Boston International Film Festival.

It's Criminal (2017) documented a collaborative project between incarcerated women at Sullivan County Department of Corrections in New Hampshire and Dartmouth College students creating an original theatrical work. The production process spanned several years, with filming completed in 2010 and post-production extending until 2017 due to funding constraints. The documentary premiered at the Los Angeles Women's International Film Festival in 2017 and was broadcast on FUSE television in 2018.

Taylor currently serves as Senior Producer at Dartmouth College, where she creates content featuring faculty, staff, and students. Her collaboration with author Kimberly Juanita Brown on "Slavery's Afterlife" received a CASE Award in 2022.

== Selected awards and nominations ==
Year	Award	Festival/Organization	Film	Result
2011	Youth Jury Award	Seattle International Film Festival	Circus Dreams	Won
2011	Indie Spec Special Recognition Award	Boston International Film Festival	Circus Dreams	Won
2017	Award of Merit Special Mention	Impact DOC Awards	It's Criminal	Won
2017	Best Documentary	Vermont PBS	It's Criminal	Won
2018	Best International Documentary	Monterrey International Film Festival	It's Criminal	Won
2022	Best of District Case I Award	Council for Advancement and Support of Education	"Short Talks on Big Ideas: Slavery's Afterlife"	Won

== Filmography ==
Year	Title	Role(s)	Type	Notes
1993	Greetings from Iraq	Director	28-minute documentary	Master's project at Stanford; broadcast on PBS in 1993
2011	Circus Dreams	Director, Producer	Feature documentary	Premiered at Toronto International Film Festival; broadcast on PBS in 2012
2017	It's Criminal	Director, Producer	Feature documentary	Premiered at Los Angeles Women's International Film Festival; broadcast on FUSE in 2018
