= Hill Farmstead Brewery =

Brewery in Greensboro Bend, Vermont

Coordinates: 44°36′25″N 72°15′47″W

- Industry: Alcoholic beverage
- Founded: 2010
- Founder: Shaun E. Hill
- Headquarters: Greensboro, Vermont, United States
- Products: Beer
- Website: hillfarmstead.com

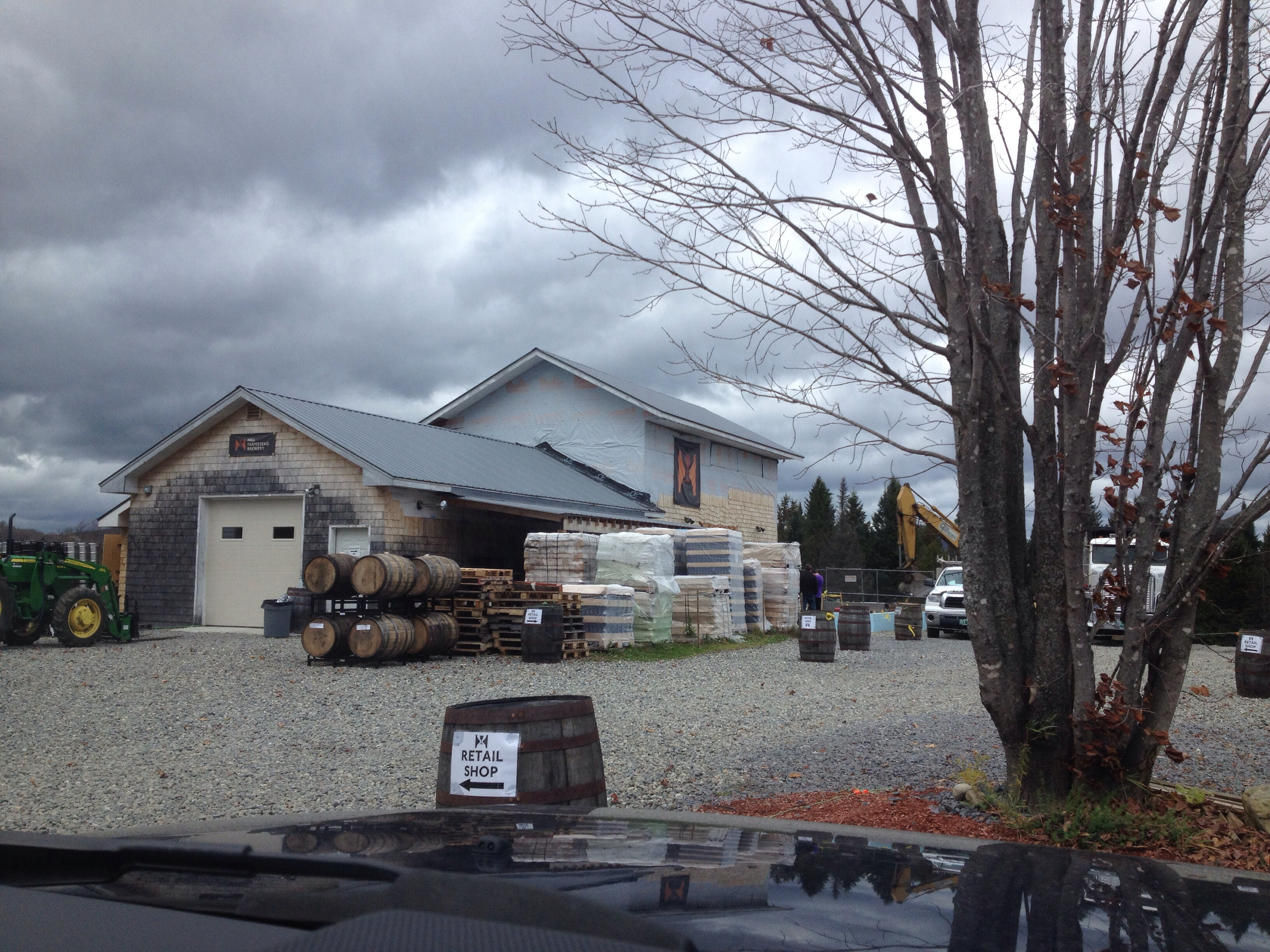
Hill Farmstead Brewery in 2013

Hill Farmstead Brewery is a brewery established in 2010 by Shaun Hill in Greensboro Bend, Vermont, United States. It is located in the "Northeast Kingdom" of Vermont, about seventy miles from the state's largest city, Burlington.

== History ==
Brewery founder Shaun Hill learned to make beer for a science fair project while in high school, and then started a home-brew club in college. His first commercial experience was at The Shed in Vermont. Hill then went on to brew in Denmark at Fanø Bryghus and Nørrebro Bryghus, before returning to the US to launch his own brewery.

== Awards ==
Since opening, the brewery has received widespread acclaim for its beers across a range of styles, most notably American Pale Ale, IPA, Porter and Saison. In 2011, Hill Farmstead was awarded the title of 'Best New Brewery in the World' by consumer review website RateBeer.com. In 2012, 2014, 2015, 2016, 2017, 2018, 2019, and 2020 the RateBeer community named Hill Farmstead the 'Best Brewery in the World' (it finished second in 2013).
