= Von Trapp Brewing =

American brewery

Coordinates: 44°28′14″N 72°44′7″W

von Trapp Brewing
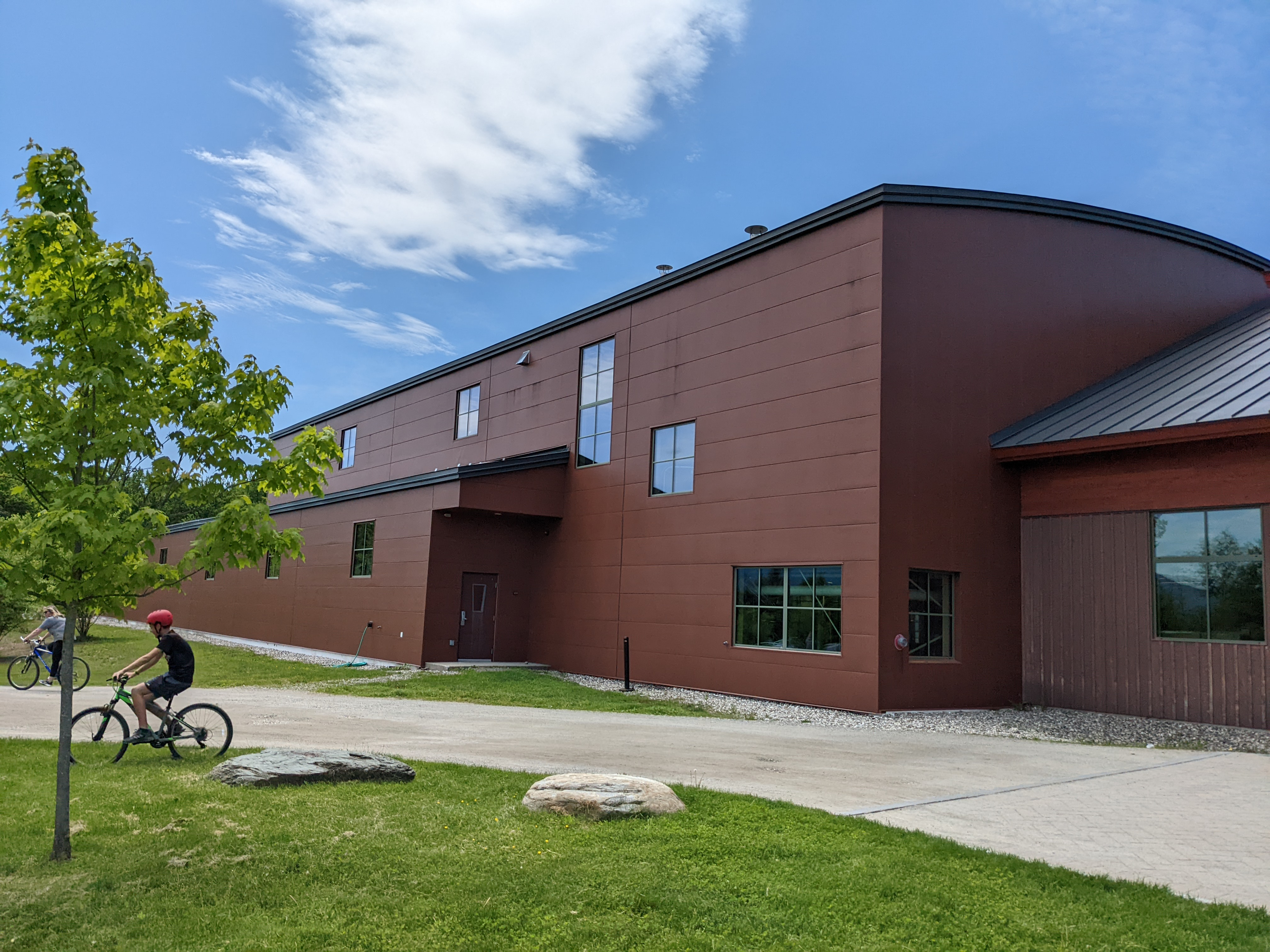
- von Trapp Brewery
- Formerly: Trapp Lager
- Industry: Alcoholic beverage
- Founded: 2010 (16 years ago)
- Founder: Johannes von Trapp
- Headquarters: Stowe, Vermont, U.S.
- Products: Beer
- Production output: 3,600 barrels
- Owner: von Trapp Family
- Website: www.vontrappbrewing.com

von Trapp Brewing is an American brewery that was founded in 2010, as Trapp Lager, at von Trapp Family Lodge & Resort in Stowe, Vermont. The resort was founded by Georg and Maria von Trapp in 1950. Von Trapp Brewing was established by their youngest son, Johannes von Trapp.

In 2015, the Trapp Family built the 30,000 square foot brewery to expand its distribution from Vermont, New Hampshire and Massachusetts to 17 states as of April 2025.

In September 2016, the family opened the von Trapp Bierhall, a mile from the von Trapp Family Lodge & Resort, serving von Trapp specialty, seasonal and year-round beers and Austrian inspired cuisine. After initially being available only in Vermont, in 2015 they expanded sales into New Hampshire and Massachusetts. von Trapp is available in Vermont, New Hampshire, Massachusetts, Connecticut, Colorado, Florida, Maine, Maryland, Michigan, New Jersey, New York, North Carolina, Oregon, Pennsylvania, Rhode Island, Tennessee and Virginia.

== Range of beers ==
The brewery currently produces five year-round beers, with a further seven being either specialty creations or part of a rotation.

As of 2025, the current year-round offerings are:

- Helles Golden Lager (4.9% )
- Kölsch Blonde Ale (5.0%)
- Vienna Austrian Style Lager (5.2%)
- Pilsner Bohemian Style Lager (5.4%)
- Dunkel Dark Lager (5.7%)

The rotational or specialty beers are:

- Radler Lager with Grapefruit (3.9%) (rotational)
- Oktoberfest Lager (5.6%) (rotational)
- Trösten Lager (6.0%) (rotational)
- Bavarian Pilsner (5.0%) (specialty)
- Czech Pilsner (4.5%) (specialty)
- West Coast Pilsner (6.0%) (specialty)
- Dortmunder BBCO vTB (5.8) (collaboration)

== Facilities ==
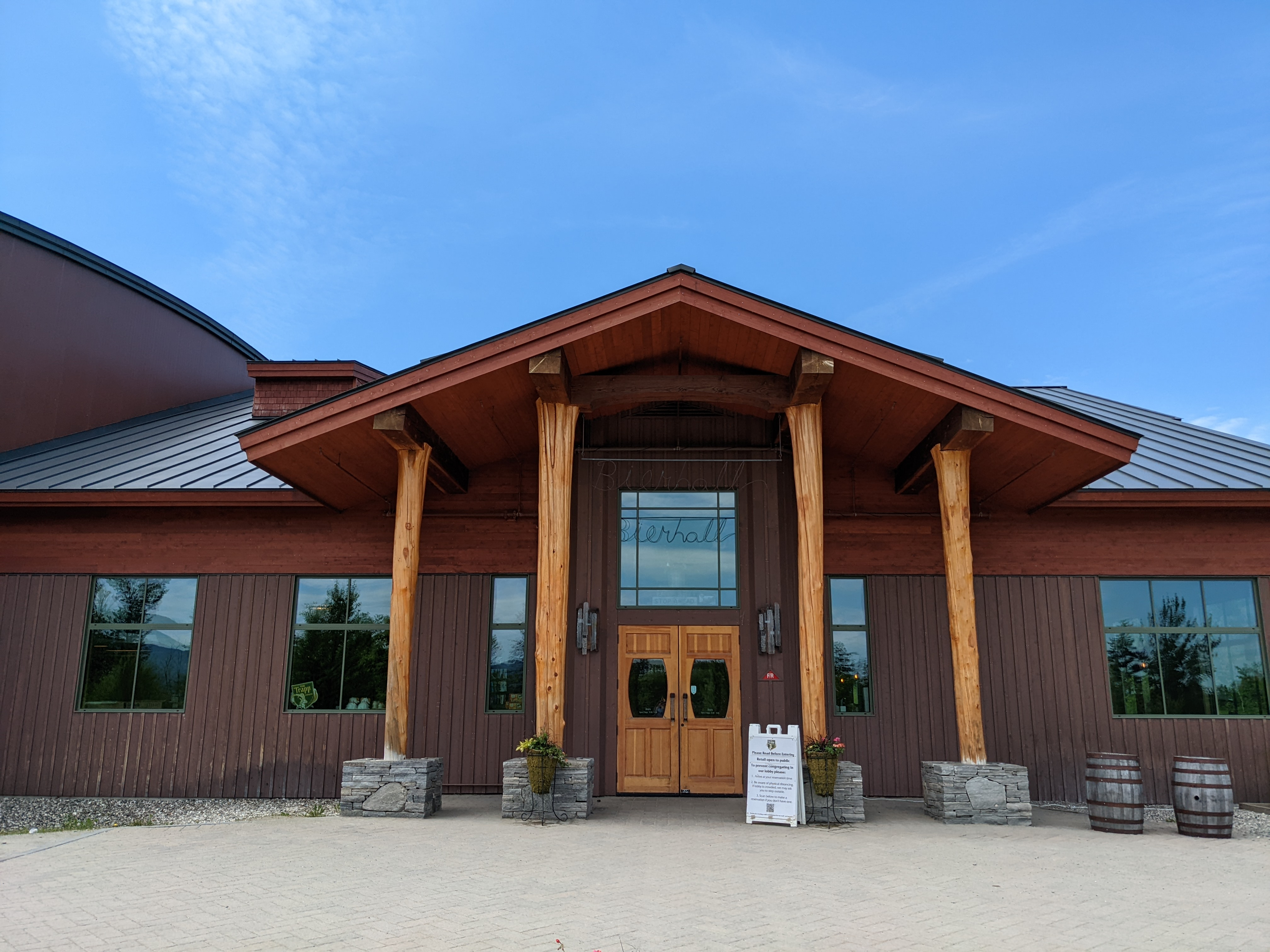
Entrance to the Bierhall

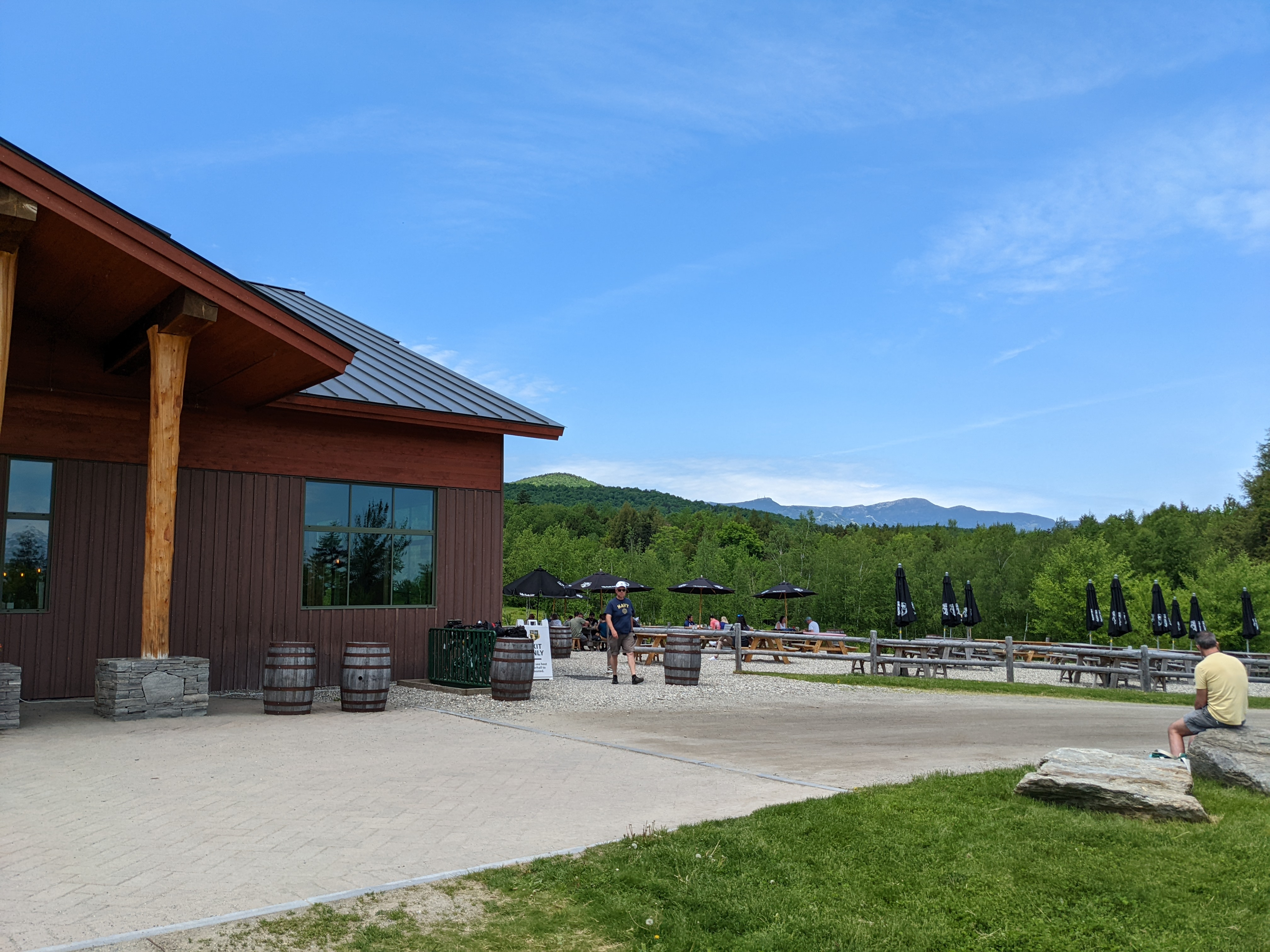
Biergarden

== See also ==
- List of Vermont breweries
- Beer in the United States
