= Taylor Wright-Sanson =

American unicyclist (born 1991)

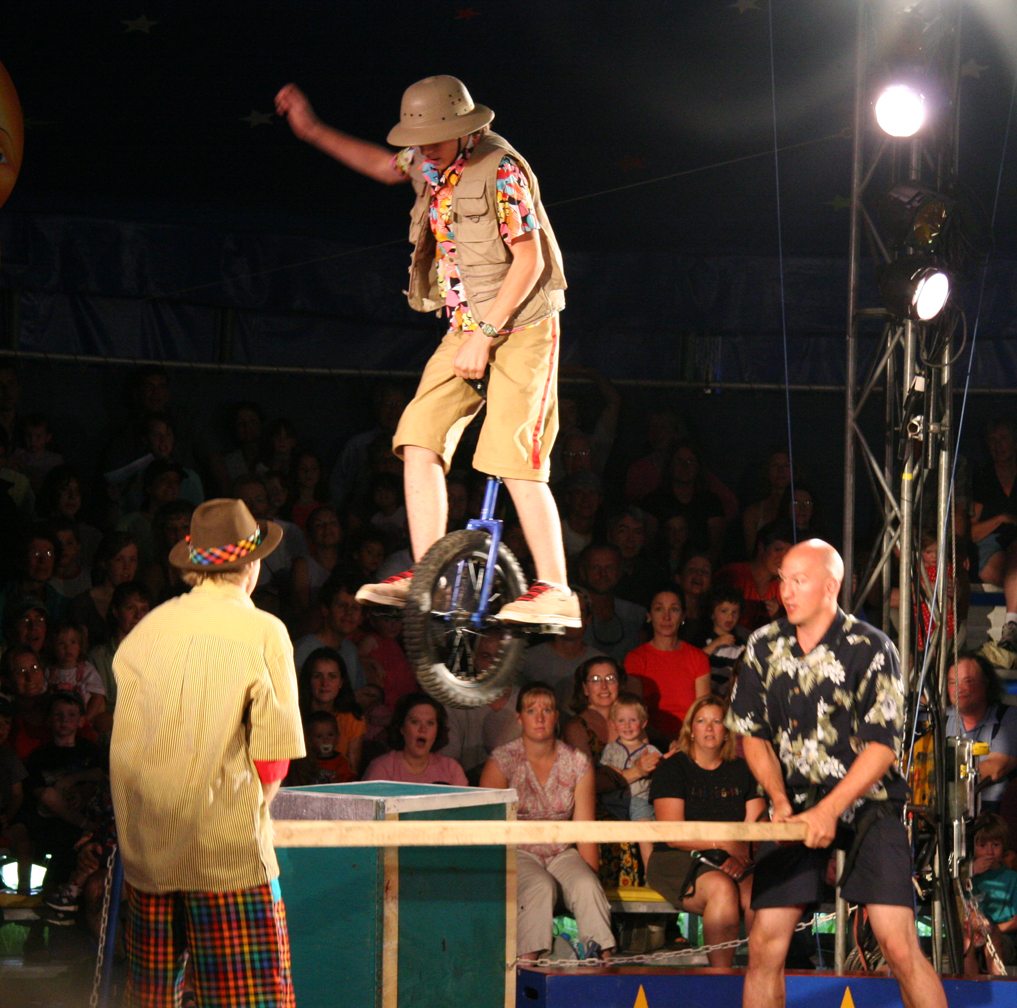
Taylor Wright-Sanson

Taylor Wright-Sanson (born August 17, 1991) is an American unicyclist best known for bringing trials and street style unicycling to the circus ring.

During the summers of 2006-2009 he performed unicycle stunts in nearly 300 shows with Circus Smirkus.

He won the first national unicycle competition he entered: the Trials Competition at the Ottawa Unicycle Invasion in 2008 (OUI '08), held in Ottawa, Ontario, Canada.

He is one of the only unicyclists to consistently land a backflip dismount off the unicycle, having performed the stunt hundreds of times during performances.

== Video appearances ==
- Inner Balance
