= Greensboro, Vermont =

- Town
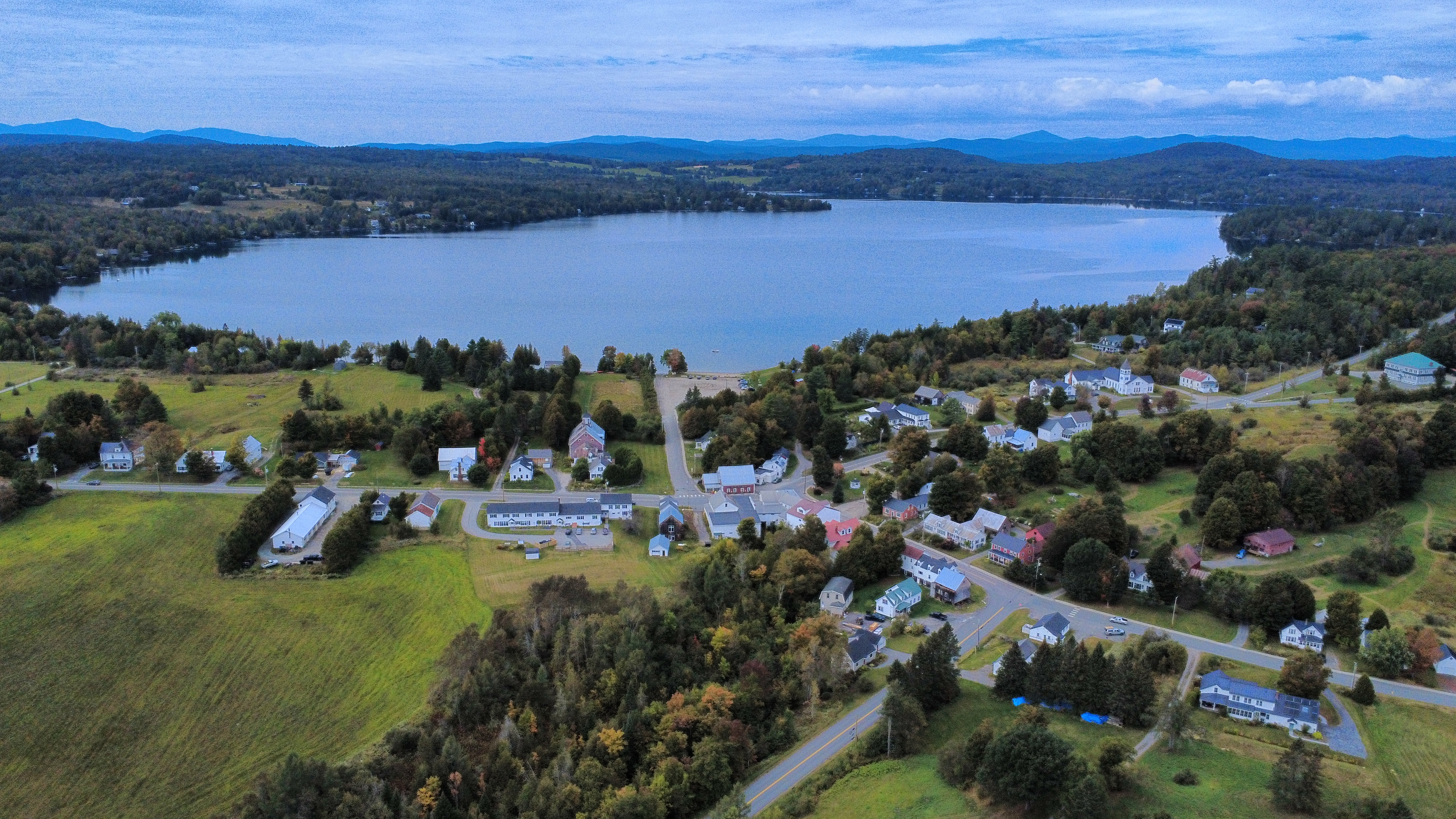
- Greensboro village and Caspian Lake from the southeast

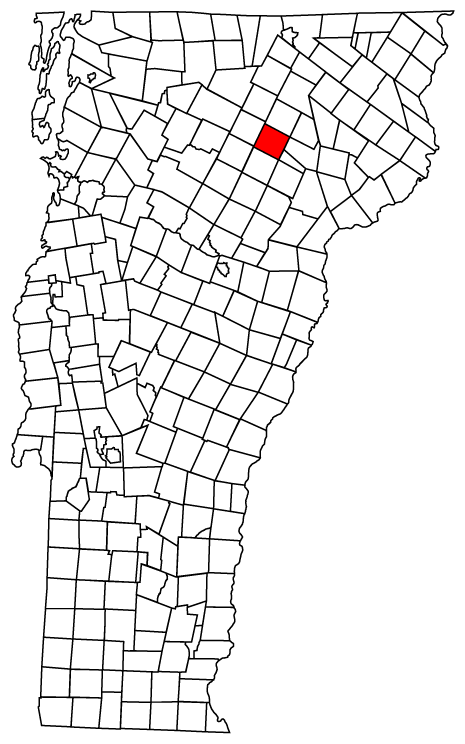
- Location in Vermont
- Coordinates: 44°37′28″N 72°16′02″W
- Country: United States
- State: Vermont
- County: Orleans
- Chartered: August 23, 1781
- Communities: Greensboro; East Greensboro; Greensboro Bend

Area
  - Total: 39.4 sq mi (102.0 km^{2})
  - Land: 37.8 sq mi (97.8 km^{2})
  - Water: 1.6 sq mi (4.2 km^{2})
- Elevation: 1,831 ft (558 m)

Population (2020)
  - Total: 811
  - Density: 21/sq mi (8.3/km^{2})
- Time zone: UTC-5 (EST)
  - Summer (DST): UTC-4 (EDT)
- ZIP Codes: 05841 (Greensboro); 05842 (Greensboro Bend); 05826 (Craftsbury); 05827 (Craftsbury Common)
- Area code: 802
- FIPS code: 50-30175
- GNIS feature ID: 1462109
- Website: greensborovt.gov

Greensboro is a town in Orleans County, Vermont, United States. The population was 811 at the 2020 census. The town includes the places of Campbells Corners, East Greensboro, Gebbie Corner, Greensboro Four Corners, Greensboro Bend, Tolman(s) Corner, and Burlington Point. Greensboro Bend and the central village of Greensboro were classified as census-designated places.

== History ==
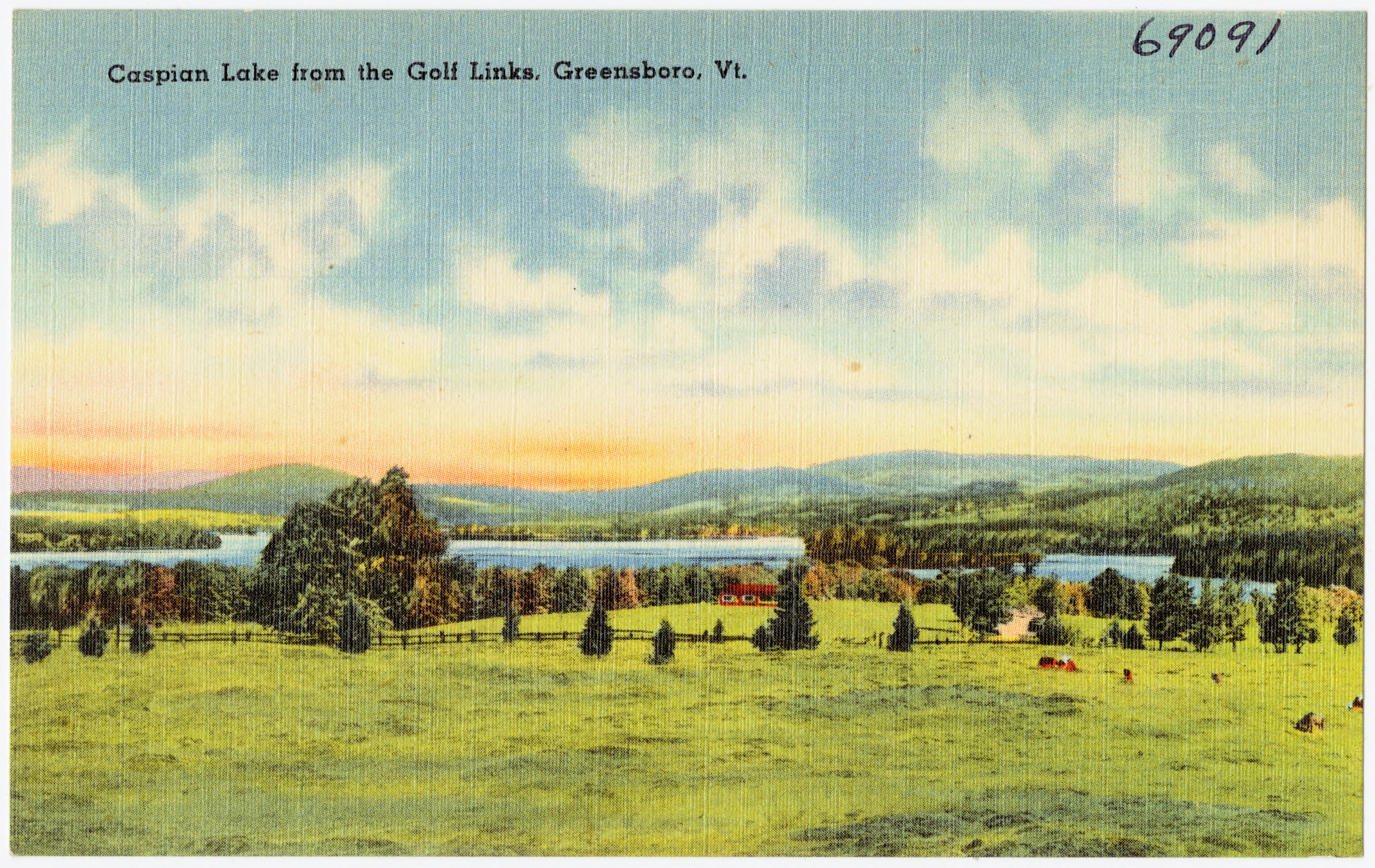
Postcard image c. 1940

Greensboro was chartered in 1781. The town was named for Timothy Green, one of the original charter recipients and an original landowner under the charter. However, there is no evidence that he ever visited the town, and his land was sold for non-payment of taxes a few decades after he received it.^{:13-14} Only three of the original proprietors settled in the town; most likely, the others were land speculators who sold their land to others or let it be sold at tax sales when buyers could not be found.^{:18}

The Bayley Hazen Military Road, built before the town was chartered, allowed its development. The road passed to the west of Caspian Lake, and a wooden blockhouse was constructed there in 1779^{:21-22} on what is now known as Block House Hill^{:frontispiece}. In 1781, the blockhouse's party of four was attacked by Abenaki; two were killed and two were captured.^{:22-23} A second road was built by Timothy Hinman between 1791 and 1793. This road, which came to be known as the Hinman Settler Road, branched off from the Bayley-Hazen in Greensboro and continued to Derby. These two roads were of major importance to the settlement of northern Vermont.^{:23}

The town sent many soldiers to fight in the Civil War. Of eight prisoners of war from the town, confined to Andersonville Prison, one returned.

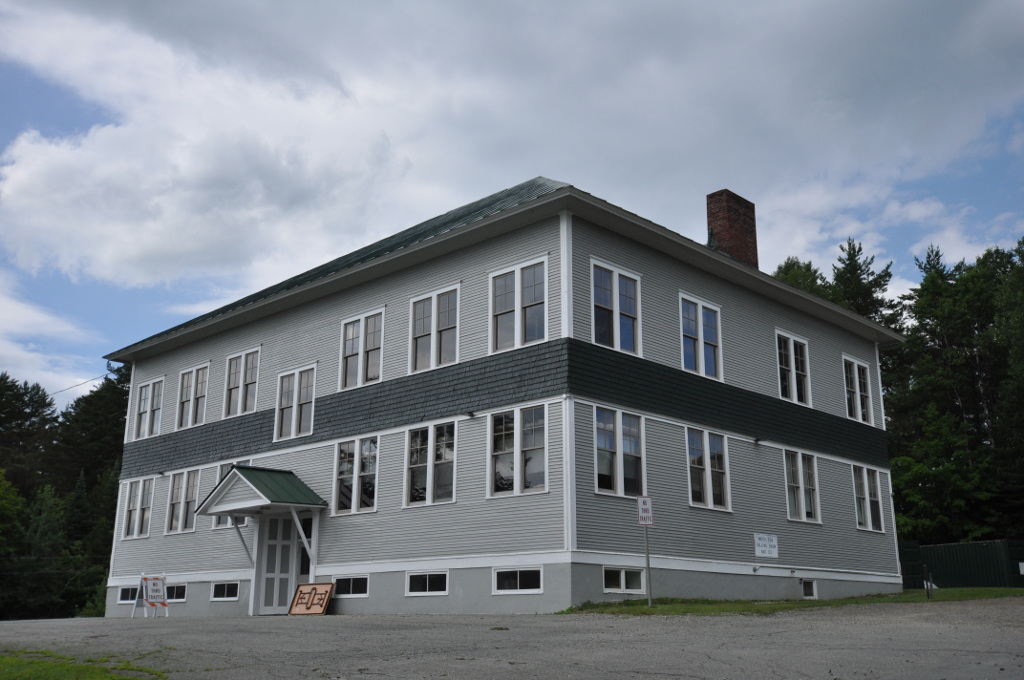
Greensboro town offices

In the early 20th century, a development near the Highland Lodge contained restrictive covenants in the title forbidding subsequent resale to Jews. These restrictions were found to be illegal by the US Supreme Court in 1948.

The Highland Lodge opened in 1954. It had a hotel and restaurant that was open year-round. It had a beach on Caspian Lake with sailboats, kayaks, and canoes; children's play programs and nature programs in the summer and nature hikes and cross-country ski trails in the winter. Special events included wedding, business retreats, music programs, workshops, and talks. It was largely closed in 2011, being open only for room and cottage rentals, but a group of investors purchased the property in December 2016 and have reopened the Lodge and restaurant seasonally.

== Geography ==
According to the United States Census Bureau, the town has a total area of 39.4 square miles (102.0 km^{2}), of which 37.8 square miles (97.8 km^{2}) is land and 1.6 square miles (4.2 km^{2}) (4.11%) is water.

The town includes Caspian Lake and most of Eligo Pond, also known as Lake Eligo.

== Demographics ==
Historical population
Census	Pop.	Note	%±
1790	19		—
1800	280		1,373.7%
1810	566		102.1%
1820	625		10.4%
1830	784		25.4%
1840	883		12.6%
1850	1,008		14.2%
1860	1,065		5.7%
1870	1,027		−3.6%
1880	1,061		3.3%
1890	918		−13.5%
1900	874		−4.8%
1910	931		6.5%
1920	905		−2.8%
1930	831		−8.2%
1940	768		−7.6%
1950	737		−4.0%
1960	600		−18.6%
1970	593		−1.2%
1980	677		14.2%
1990	717		5.9%
2000	770		7.4%
2010	762		−1.0%
2020	811		6.4%
U.S. Decennial Census

As of the census of 2020, there were 811 people, 289 households, and 173 families residing in the town. The population density was 25.6 people per square mile (9.8/km^{2}). There were 719 housing units at an average density of 25.5 per square mile (9.8/km^{2}). The racial makeup of the town was 93.96% White, 0.37% African American, 0.37% Asian, and 4.81% from two or more races. Hispanic or Latino of any race were 0.99% of the population.

There were 313 households, out of which 14.2% had children under the age of 18 living with them, 49.8% were married couples living together, 8.9% had a female householder with no husband present, and 28.3% were non-families. 6.6% of all households were made up of individuals, and 6.3% had someone living alone who was 65 years of age or older. The average household size was 2.10 and the average family size was 2.53.

In the town, the population was spread out, with 12.6% under the age of 18, 7.0% from 18 to 24, 28.3% from 15 to 44, 21.1% from 45 to 64, and 37.1% who were 65 years of age or older. The median age was 54 years. For every 100 females, there were 99.7 males. For every 100 females age 18 and over, there were 100.3 males.

== Government ==
=== Town ===
All election results as of the March 4th 2026 General Election

- Moderator – Mavis MacNeil
- Chair, Selectboard – Judy Carpenter
- Town Clerk – Kim Greaves
- Asst. Town Clerk – Brandy Smith
- Treasurer – Brett Stanciu
- Auditor – Brittany Butler
- Lister – Kim Greaves
- Lister – Kristen Leahy
- Lister – Harold Tolman
- Trustee of Public Funds – Peggy Lipscomb
- Library Trustee – Valerie Carter
- Library Trustee - Gaylin Fisher
- Water Board – Nat Smith, John Mackin, Bill Eisner

=== School District ===
- Member, District School Board – Samantha Friend
- Member, District School Board – Juliana Swank

== Economy ==
=== Personal income ===
The median income for a household in the town was $34,583, and the median income for a family was $40,917. Males had a median income of $31,250 versus $20,917 for females. The per capita income for the town was $19,396. About 3.7% of families and 6.9% of the population were below the poverty line, including 11.3% of those under age 18 and 5.4% of those age 65 or over.

Greensboro has the highest per capita income in Orleans County for a town. Newport city is higher. Greensboro's income ranks it 129th out of 282 census areas in Vermont.

=== Industry ===
Circus Smirkus, a non-profit youth circus, is based here. The company was founded in Greensboro by Rob Mermin in 1987.

The Greensboro Arts Alliance and Residency (GAAR), the summer wing of The Mirror Theater Ltd, was formed here in 2005 to mix professional Mirror Repertory Company members with local community members. In 2016, GAAR performed the American premiere of Joshua Sobol's Sinners, directed by Brian Cox, in Greensboro.

Hill Farmstead Brewery is a local craft brewery that was named by RateBeer in 2015 as the "Best Brewery in the World", "Best Brewery in the United States", and "Top Brewery in Vermont". It was previously voted the Best Brewery in the World in 2012 and 2014 as well.

Jasper Hill Farm was awarded "Best Unpasteurized Cheese" for its Bayley Hazen Blue at the 2014 World Cheese Awards in London.

==== Tourism ====
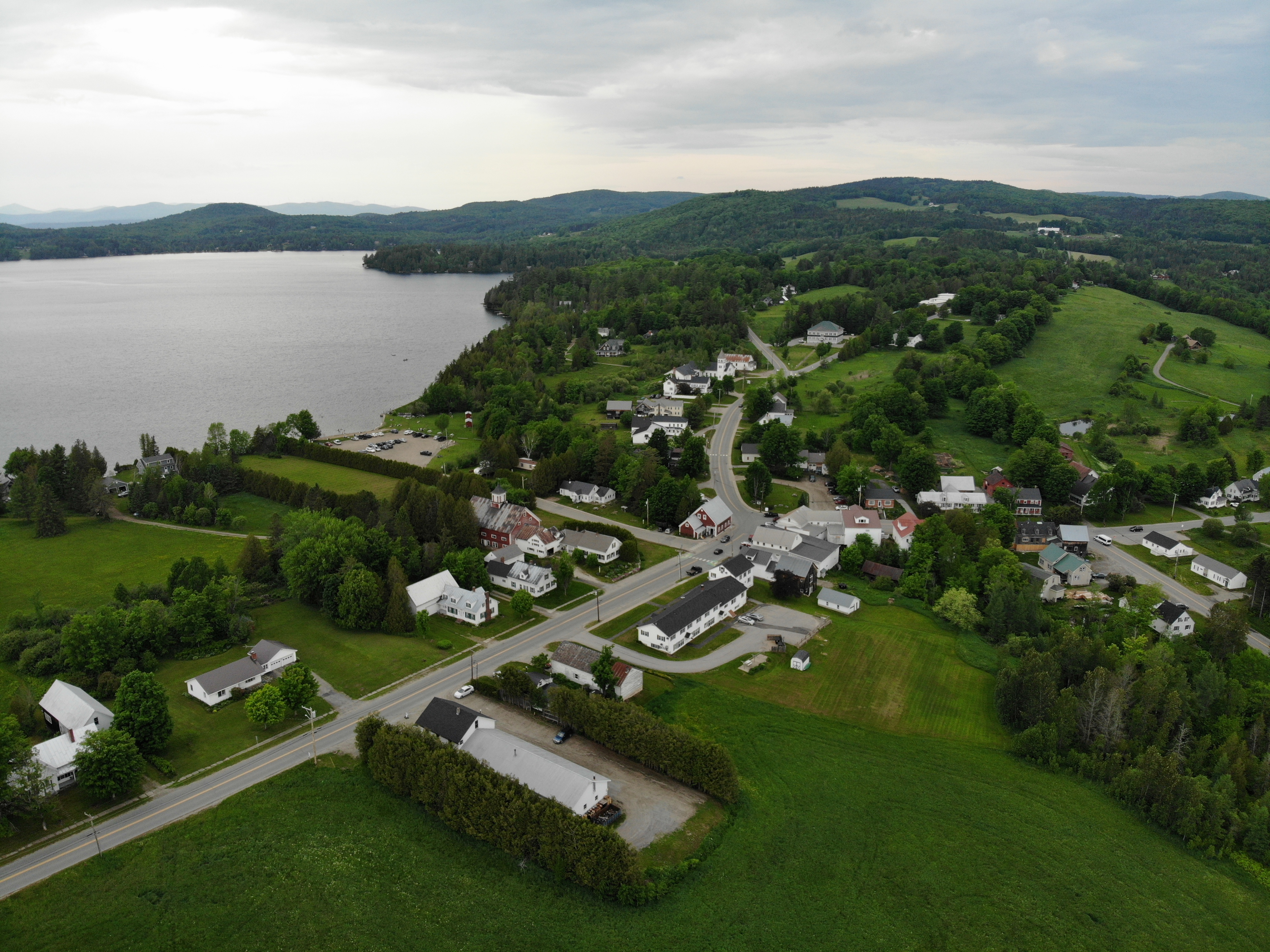
Aerial photo of Greensboro village with Caspian Lake in the background

Caspian Lake is surrounded by cottages, many available for summer rental. The lake is used for boating, sailing and fishing. There is a public beach at the south end, in town, with a boat ramp. Wake boats are prohibited from accessing the lake via the beach. The one inn in town, the Highland Lodge, rents rooms and cottages, and holds group events.

Ice fishing is popular.

Greensboro has a nine-hole golf course, Mountain View, since circa 1898, with views of the lake and Mount Mansfield.

== Community ==
The Greensboro Association was founded in 1934 to conceive, advance, and support village initiatives and organizations.

Greensboro was the setting of a short film called The Abels House is Green directed by part-time resident Duncan M. Rogers.

The hub of town is a general store called Willeys.

The Green Mountain Monastery, a community of women, was formed here in 1999.

== Notable people ==
- Alfred Barr, art historian and the first director of the Museum of Modern Art
- Harriet Beecher Conant, physician
- James F. Fixx, Editor, Author and Greensboro summer resident 1961-1983.
- Robert Gilpin, professor emeritus at Princeton University
- Warner A. Graham, Associate Justice of the Vermont Supreme Court
- Andrew Johnson, cross-country skier
- Bliss Perry, scholar and editor
- Benjamin H. Randall, politician and businessman
- William Hubbs Rehnquist, Chief Justice of the United States
- Wallace Stegner, Pulitzer Prize-winning author
- Anna E. Stoddard (1852-1936), writer, journalist, social reformer
