= Greensboro (CDP), Vermont =

Census-designated place in Vermont, United States

Greensboro, Vermont
- Census-designated place
- Location within Vermont Location within the United States
- Coordinates: 44°34′37″N 72°18′07″W
- Country: United States
- State: Vermont
- County: Orleans
- Town: Greensboro

Area
  - Total: 3.82 sq mi (9.90 km^{2})
  - Land: 2.59 sq mi (6.71 km^{2})
  - Water: 1.23 sq mi (3.18 km^{2})
- Elevation: 1,398 ft (426 m)

Population (2020)
  - Total: 156
- Time zone: UTC-5 (Eastern (EST))
  - Summer (DST): UTC-4 (EDT)
- ZIP Code: 05841
- Area code: 802
- FIPS code: 50-30100
- GNIS feature ID: 2586633

Greensboro is the central village and a census-designated place (CDP) in the town of Greensboro, Orleans County, Vermont, United States. As of the 2020 census, it had a population of 156, out of 811 in the entire town of Greensboro.

== Geography ==
The CDP is in southern Orleans County, stretching from the center to the southern border of the town of Greensboro. It is bordered to the south by the town of Hardwick in Caledonia County and to the southeast by the CDP of Greensboro Bend. The village center sits at the outlet (the southeast end) of Caspian Lake and includes the lake's entire shoreline. The lake drains south via Greensboro Brook to the Lamoille River, a west-flowing tributary of Lake Champlain. The intersection known as Tolman Corner is on the southwest border of the CDP.

No numbered state highways pass through the community. Greensboro is 6 miles (10 km) northeast of Hardwick village and 17 miles (27 km) southwest of Barton.
