= Lawson's Finest Liquids =

American craft brewery based in Waitsfield, Vermont

- Location: Waitsfield, Vermont, United States
- Opened: 2018 (Waitsfield brewery and taproom)
- Key people: Adeline Druart (CEO)
- Owned by: Sean Lawson and Karen Lawson
- Distribution: U.S. Northeast
- Website: www.lawsonsfinest.com

Lawson's Finest Liquids is an American craft brewery based in Waitsfield, Vermont, founded in 2008 by Sean and Karen Lawson. The company became widely known for its "Sunshine" family of IPAs, especially Sip of Sunshine, which is brewed under an alternating proprietorship at Two Roads Brewing in Stratford, Connecticut. The brewery opened a destination facility with taproom and retail space in Waitsfield in 2018 and has earned medals at the World Beer Cup and Great American Beer Festival.

== History ==
Lawson's Finest Liquids sold for the first time on St. Patrick's Day in 2008. At the time they were a one-barrel nanobrewery next to the founders' home in Warren, Vermont, before expanding operations throughout the Mad River Valley. In 2014, the company began brewing Sip of Sunshine and other beers at Two Roads Brewing in Connecticut through an alternating proprietorship arrangement to meet demand beyond Vermont.

The brewery opened a taproom and retail store in Waitsfield in October 2018. In 2024, the company named Adeline Druart, former president of Vermont Creamery, as chief executive officer to lead its next phase of growth.

== Operations ==
Lawson's Finest operates its brewery and taproom in Waitsfield, Vermont. At the time of its opening, the site included a 34-barrel brewhouse. Sip of Sunshine and the Super Session series are brewed at Two Roads Brewing in Stratford, Connecticut, using Lawson's recipes and ingredients, while other year-round and seasonal beers are produced in Vermont.

By 2021 the brewery's distribution covered nine Northeastern states: Connecticut, Massachusetts, Maine, New Hampshire, New Jersey, New York, Pennsylvania, Rhode Island, and Vermont. In August 2024, an expansion into North Carolina marked the company's first move outside the Northeast.

In 2023 Lawson's Finest achieved B Corp certification and completed a 100% renewable-energy transition that included installing what was reported as Vermont's largest solar canopy at the time.

== Beers ==
Lawson's Finest is best known for its Sunshine family of IPAs. Sip of Sunshine, introduced in 2014, is the brewery's widely distributed flagship beer and is brewed at Two Roads Brewing in Connecticut. In 2020 the brewery launched Little Sip IPA as a year-round beer.

== Awards and recognition ==
Lawson's Finest has received recognition and medals at major U.S. beer competitions. Maple Tripple Ale earned a bronze medal in the category of Specialty Beer at the 2010 World Beer Cup and a silver medal in 2012. The beer also won silver in the Specialty Ale category at the 2014 Great American Beer Festival. In 2025, Fayston Maple Imperial Stout won a silver medal in the "British-Style Imperial Stout" category at the World Beer Cup. Brewbound named Lawson's Finest Liquids its 2023 "Craft Brewery of the Year".
