= Alchemist (disambiguation) =

An alchemist is a person who practices alchemy.

Alchemist or Alchemyst may also refer to:

== Books and stories ==
- The Alchemist (novel), a 1988 allegorical novel by Paulo Coelho
- The Alchemist (play), a 1610 play by Ben Jonson
- "The Alchemist" (short story), a 1908 short story by H. P. Lovecraft
- The Alchemist, a 2002 novel by Donna Boyd
- The Alchemist, a 1966 science fiction novelette by Charles L. Harness
- The Alchemists, a 1984 science fiction novel by Geary Gravel
- The Alchemyst: The Secrets of the Immortal Nicholas Flamel, a 2007 fantasy novel by Michael Scott

== Characters ==
- The Alchemist, a villain in Larryboy: The Cartoon Adventures, a spinoff of VeggieTales
- Element Lad, a comic superhero sometimes known by the codename "Alchemist"
- A recurring character on The Venture Bros.
- A character in Super Robot Monkey Team Hyperforce Go!
- Alchemist (DC Comics), a DC Comics supervillain
- Alchemist (Marvel Comics), a Marvel Comics character

== Art ==
=== Paintings ===
- The Alchemist Discovering Phosphorus, 1771 painting by Joseph Wright of Derby
- The Alchemist, 1663 painting by Cornelis Pietersz Bega
- An Alchemist, 17th century painting by Thomas Wijck
- An Alchemist in his Study, 17th century painting by Egbert van Heemskerck

=== Film, stage, and television ===
- The Alchemist (film), a 1986 horror film
- The Alchemist (play), a 17th-century play by Ben Jonson
- "The Alchemist" (The Blacklist), a 2014 episode from TV series The Blacklist

=== Music ===
- Alchemist (band), an Australian progressive metal band
- The Alchemist (musician) (Alan Maman; born 1977), American record producer and DJ
- The Alchemist (Home album), a 1973 album by Home
- The Alchemist (Witchcraft album), a 2007 album by Swedish doom metal band Witchcraft
- The Alchemist (John Zorn album), the 2014 album by composer John Zorn
- The Alchemist (Handel), incidental music for a 1710 production of Ben Jonson's play
- Alchemist, a 2012 electronic album by Aleksander "Savant" Vinter
- "Alchemist", a song by Russell Watson on the 2004 album Amore Musica
- "Alchemist", a song by Good Kid on the 2018 EP Good Kid
- "Alchemist", a song by Kasabian from the 2022 album The Alchemist's Euphoria
- "The Alchemist", a song by Bruce Dickinson from his 1998 album The Chemical Wedding
- "The Alchemist", a song by Nebula from their 2006 album Apollo
- "The Alchemist", a song by Iron Maiden from their 2010 album The Final Frontier
- "The Alchemist", a song by Monuments from their 2014 album The Amanuensis
- "The Alchemist", a song by Blue Öyster Cult from their 2020 album The Symbol Remains
- "The Alchemist.", a song by Lil Yachty from his 2023 album Let's Start Here.

== Other uses ==
- Alchemist (company), a Japanese video game developer
- Alchemist (restaurant), Copenhagen, Denmark
- Alchemist (video game), a 1983 ZX Spectrum game
- Alchemist Brewery, an American brewery
- Arc Alchemist series, Series of GPU by Intel
- SS Alchymist, a British coaster
- A recurring job class in the Final Fantasy series
- Alchymist (Catephia alchymista), a moth
- The Alchemist, Battersea, a former public house

== See also ==
- Johann der Alchimist (1406–1464), Margrave of Brandenburg
- List of alchemists
- List of chemists, includes some alchemists
- List of occultists, includes several alchemists
