= Anna E. Stoddard =

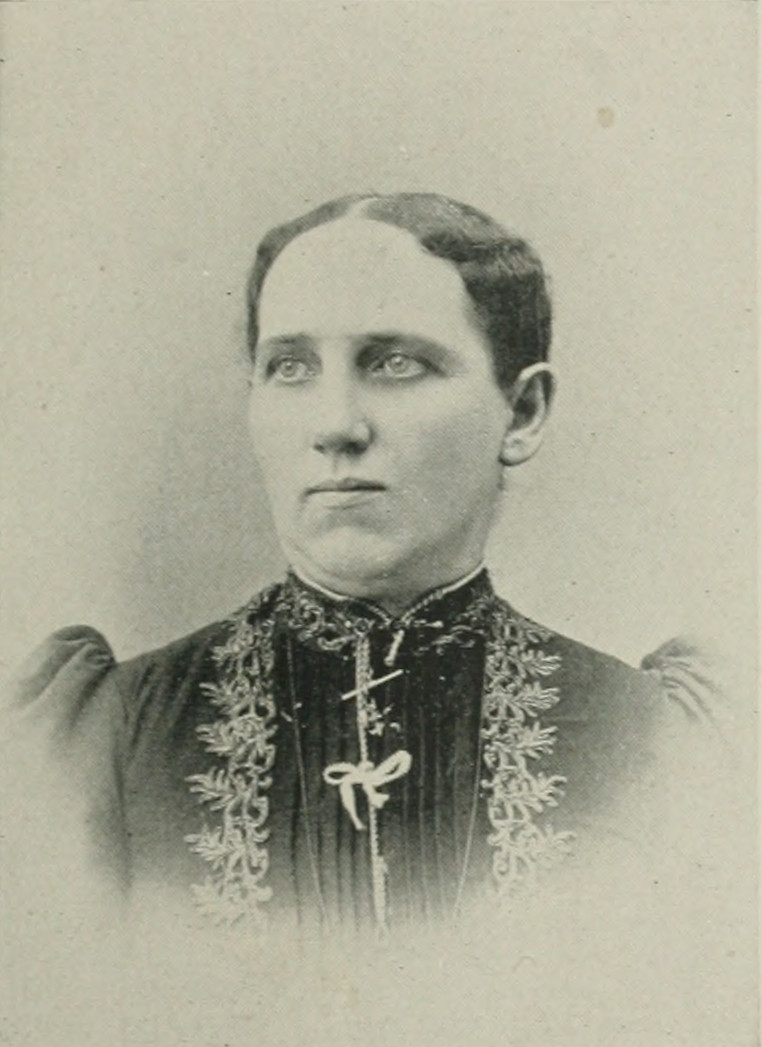
Photo in A Woman of the Century

Anna E. Stoddard (née Rollins; after first marriage, Tanner; after second marriage, Stoddard; 1852–1936) was an American writer, journalist, social reformer, and anti-secret society agitator. She established a mission school for African-American children in Washington, D.C. For years, Stoddard was active in suffrage work.

== Early life and education ==
Anna Elizabeth Rollins was born in Greensboro, Vermont, on September 19, 1852. Her father was David Rollins, of English descent. Her mother was Betsey F. (Thompson) Rollins, a direct descendant of the Scotch who settled in the vicinity of Plymouth, Massachusetts. The family removed to Sheffield, Vermont, when she was six years of age, and at eleven, she was converted and joined the Free Baptist Church. Her parents then moved to Cambridge, Massachusetts, where she received her education in the public schools. Foremost in Sunday school and other church work, she was recognized as a leader among her young friends.

== Marriages ==
In 1880, she married John Tanner Jr. of Boston, an earnest Christian reformer and strongly opposed to secret orders. He died on September 13, 1883.

Widowed, she went south to engage in Christian work. In December 1885, she married Rev. James P. Stoddard, secretary and general agent of the National Christian Association, with headquarters in Chicago, Illinois.

== Career ==
With her husband, she labored in several parts of the country along the lines of reforms. Always an advocate of temperance, she united at an early age with the International Organisation of Good Templars (IOGT) in Massachusetts, and occupied every chair given to women and became a member of the Grand Lodge. Finding that most of the time during the meetings was spent on trivial matters of a routine character, to the exclusion of practical, aggressive work against the liquor traffic, she came to the conclusion that it was a hindrance rather than a help to true gospel temperance work. She severed her connection with the order and gave her energies to the Woman's Christian Temperance Union (WCTU), which had just come to the front. Through her writings and lectures, she actively espoused that reform, organizing in different parts of the South various WCTUs and Bands of Hope.

Having been located in Washington, D.C. for a year or more, she was led to establish a mission-school for African-American children, to whom she taught the English branches, with the addition of an industrial department and a young ladies' class. A Sunday school was organized in connection with that work, with a system of house-to-house visitations, and a home for the needy and neglected children of that class was established, largely through her efforts. Since January 1890, her residence was in Boston. There her most important work was the publishing of a monthly paper for women, called Home Light, designed to encourage those who are opposed to secretism and to enlighten others as to the evils of the same. The financial responsibilities rested entirely on her from its inception. She espoused the cause of woman suffrage and took an interest in all the reforms of the day, believing that to oppose one evil to the neglect of others was not wise.

For ten years, Stoddard was the secretary of the Independent Women Voters of Boston, and director of Woman's Voice; or Public School Champion. In early years, Stoddard was a member of the Free Baptist Church, but for many years, she was connected with the Congregationalists, and later, a member of the United Presbyterian Church. She was very interested in work among girls, serving as treasurer of the New England Helping Hand Home (for working girls), and vice-president of the Ingleside (a preventive work for young girls). This work was organized in her own home. She also served as President of the Roxbury District WCTU, was a leader of a large circle of King's Daughters, taught Sunday school, and was an active church worker.

== Death ==
Anna Stoddard died in Boston, March 1, 1936, age 84.
