= Greensborough =

Greensborough can refer to:

- Greensborough, Victoria, Australian suburb
  - Greensborough railway station
- Greensborough, Ontario, neighbourhood in Canada

== See also ==
- Greensboro (disambiguation)
