= Harriet Beecher Conant =

American physician (1852–1941)

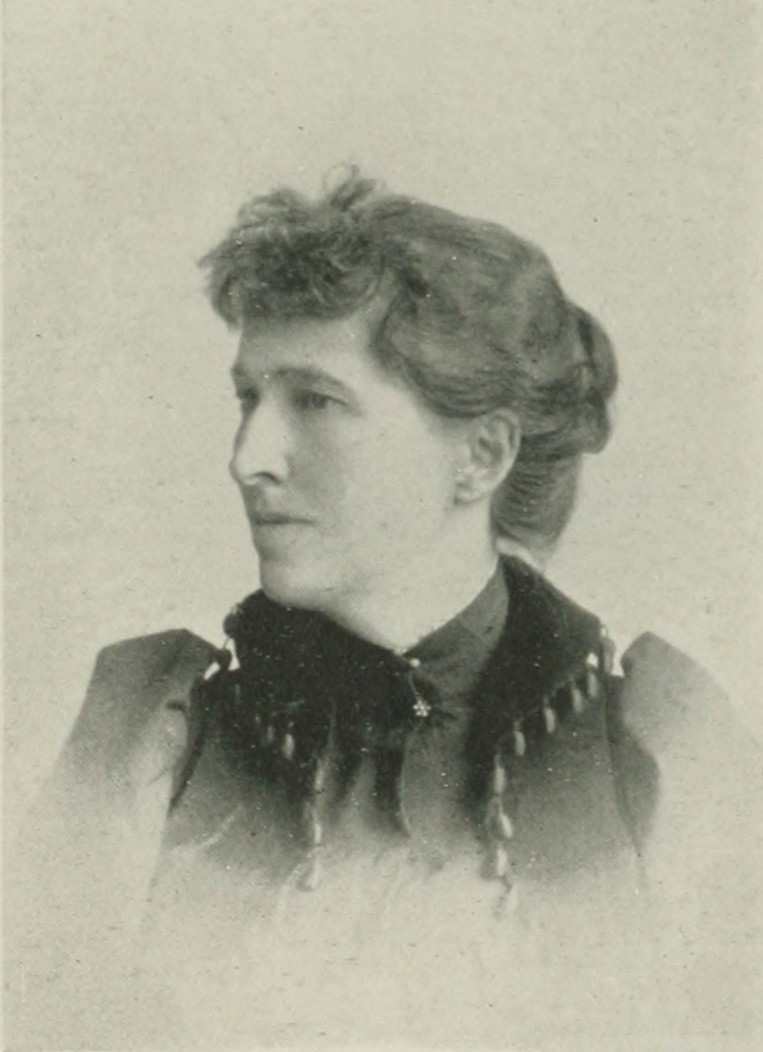
Harriet Beecher Conant

Harriet Beecher Conant (June 10, 1852 – August 22, 1941) was an American medical doctor who was the resident physician in the South Dakota Hospital for the Insane in Yankton, South Dakota.

== Early life ==
Harriet Beecher Conant was born in 1852 in Greensboro, Vermont. Her father, Ebenezer Tolman Conant, was a lifelong resident of that town. His immediate ancestors were natives of Hollis, New Hampshire, and he was a descendant of Roger Conant, one of the first five settlers of Salem, Massachusetts, and were of Puritan descent. Her maternal ancestors were among the early inhabitants of Londonderry, New Hampshire, which was settled by a colony of Scotch-Irish Presbyterians in 1719. Her mother's name was Mary Jane Fisher.

Conant's childhood was spent on a farm. Being second in age in a large family, she showed her skill as a leader and an organizer. Educational advantages in the rural districts of New England were somewhat limited.

== Career ==
The death of Conant's father in 1861 meant that the plan of a course of study was dropped. She began to teach in the public schools of Vermont. After that, she went to Unionville, Connecticut, where she remained six years, the last three as teacher in the high school. From there she was called to be principal of the public schools in St. Johnsbury, Vermont, which responsible position she held for three years, when she was obliged by ill health to resign.

Going to Minnesota she entered the medical department of the University of Minnesota in October 1888, and graduated in 1891. Through the influence of the dean, she received the appointment of resident physician in the South Dakota Hospital for the Insane in Yankton, South Dakota, the day after receiving her diploma.

== Personal life ==
On June 12, 1900, she married James Henry McLoud. She died in Minnesota in 1941.
