= Pucker factor =

Military slang for level of stress in a crisis situation

Pucker factor is a military slang phrase used to describe the level of stress and/or adrenaline response to danger or a crisis situation. The term refers to the tightening of the sphincter caused by extreme fear. The term applies only to an individual's response in a crisis situation; and not to stress levels outside of a crisis context.

Persons with low pucker factors may make decisions "like a robot" without considering ethics or the long-term consequences of their actions. Conversely, if pucker factor is excessive, then the person "puckers" – leading to panic, wherein the person is unable to think clearly and act effectively.

== See also ==
- Stress
- Fear
- Panic
- Anxiety
