= Alchemy (event) =

- Locations: Chattahoochee Hills, Georgia, United States
- Inaugurated: 2007
- Most recent: October 17-20, 2024
- Participants: 2,500 (2024 ticket cap)
- Website: www.alchemyburn.com

Alchemy is a burn event operated according to the 10 Principles of Burning Man held annually in the early fall. Alchemy was first held in 2007 and grew quickly to become the largest regional burn in the United States and second largest in the world in 2012. From 2013 onward, the size was reduced due to logistical limits.

Until 2016, Alchemy was held at Cherokee Farms, a private campground in LaFayette, Georgia, approximately 100 miles northwest of Atlanta. Alchemy 2016 took place in Bowdon, Georgia at Little Big Jam. That year's ticket cap was 2,700.

Alchemy and its sister event Euphoria are now managed by the Georgia non-profit Flashpoint Artists Initiative. They are not sanctioned by Burning Man as part of the regional burn network.

With the exception of a few contracted services, Alchemy and Flashpoint Artists Initiative are 100% volunteer managed.

Year	Theme	Participants	Flags	Location
2007	none	374		Cherokee Farms - Lafayette, GA
2008	none	656		Cherokee Farms - Lafayette, GA
2009	Shock and Awe	992		Cherokee Farms - Lafayette, GA
2010	Skeleton Key	1727		Cherokee Farms - Lafayette, GA
2011	Mutagenesis	2791		Cherokee Farms - Lafayette, GA
2012	Choose Your Own Adventure	3499 (max. tickets).		Cherokee Farms - Lafayette, GA
2013	Catalyst	2501 (max. tickets)		Cherokee Farms - Lafayette, GA
2014	Tabula Rasa	3200		Cherokee Farms - Lafayette, GA
2015	Amalgamation	3200	6	Cherokee Farms - Lafayette, GA
2016	Decadence	2700	50	Little Big Jam - Bowdon, GA
2017	Effervescence	1383	100	Chatooga County, GA
2018	Percussive Maintenance	2200 (max. tickets)	?	Chattahoochee Hills, GA
2019	Transmutation	2000	50	Chattahoochee Hills, GA
2020	Zoneburg Paranormal Museum & Extraordinary Kinetic Fun Park!	0 (cancelled due to COVID-19)		Chattahoochee Hills, GA
2022	Portals	2200	50	Cherokee Farms - Lafayette, GA
2023	Ghost Robot Resurrection	2500	40-70	Chattahoochee Hills, GA
2024	Lighting The Void	2500	80-100	Chattahoochee Hills, GA

== Event Management ==
Each year's event is managed by a team of 3-5 individuals, designated as the Events Committee, chosen by the Flashpoint Artists Initiative (FAI) Board of Directors. A public call out is made by the Board and is distributed via FAI's newsletter, The Alchemist, along with all of their social media outlets. Soon after their selection, the EC submits an event budget proposal to the Board for approval. This proposal typically contains an overall operations budget for the event, ticket price, ticket cap, event dates, and event location.

The EC has four departments: Operations, Safety, Information, and Art. Each department is managed by a Department Lead and sometimes an Assistant Department Lead. The entire EC is overseen by 1-2 Event Leads and Assistant Event Leads that act as project managers for the entire event.

The EC, utilizing the same communications outlets, then makes public call outs for the individual teams that manage the day-to-day operations of the event teams. The team leads are chosen by the EC, and there are typically 2-5 people chosen to lead each team.

None of Alchemy's EC and Team Leads are paid for their services and operate on a 100% volunteer basis. From time to time, they may be compensated with food, gas money, or other similar expenses.

=== Alchemy Public Works (APW) ===
APW is responsible for deploying and maintaining event infrastructure such as generators, tools, and shade structures. In conjunction with Fire Safety and EMS, they are also responsible for preparing the effigy to be burned on the Saturday night of the event. They also work with the EC and the Board on acquiring new equipment and infrastructure.

=== Art ===
The Art Team works with the Alchemy Art Fundraiser Event Leads to facilitate artists being able to bring and place their art installations at the event. They are the point-of-contact between Alchemy funded artists and the Placement Team, the Fire Safety Team (for art that is to be burned or utilizes open flames), and documenting art at the event.

=== Center Camp ===
Center Camp is housed under a large circus tent and is intended to be a stage for any and all participants at the event to showcase their art and expression. The Center Camp Leads are responsible for facilitating participants scheduling their own performances, coordinating with artists on showcasing their art, procuring furniture for participants to use throughout the event, as well as setting up and maintaining the camp's sound system.

=== Department of Mutant Vehicles (DMV) ===
The DMV is responsible for ensuring the registration and safe operation of mobile works of creative expression otherwise known as mutant vehicles, as well as ensuring only mutant vehicles are operating on Alchemy streets. Additionally, the DMV is responsible for ensuring all cars are parked in the designated parking areas only.

=== Effigy Team ===
The Effigy Team is responsible for designing and building the event's effigy, a large wooden art piece that is burned on the Saturday night of the event.

=== Fire Safety ===
The Fire Safety team is responsible for maintaining safety at large scale burns and fire-related installations. This team coordinates with artists and emergency service personnel to determine appropriate safety parameters for anything regarding fire. The team is responsible for developing emergency response procedures in conjunction with the Event Lead Team. This team develops a fire safety plan and communicates that plan to local authorities and ensures compliance with all local, state and federal laws.

=== First Aid ===
First Aid is responsible for procuring and maintaining basic first aid materials. Participants may request the use of these materials should they decide they require them. The First Aid team also works with the paid, licensed, and insured Emergency Medical Technicians.

The First Aid team was eliminated in 2016. All medical services are provided by a contracted group of licensed and insured medical professionals.

=== Education Team ===
Education organizes the volunteers who provide a greeting function to new arrivals at the event. Greeters are usually the second set of individuals encountered by new arrivals after the Gate workers. As such, Greeters can be helpful in building the burn "bubble" for newly arriving participants. Greeters are also responsible for the education and acculturation of all participants as they enter the event.

=== Lamplighters ===
The Lamplighters Team lights the city's streets, and maintains the lamps. Each night before sunrise, the Lamplighters place lamps on lamp poles, which were set into the ground prior to the event. Lamplighters are a prestigious group with deep and mysterious rituals.

=== Leave No Trace (LNT) ===
The LNT team is responsible for continuing education about the Leave No Trace philosophy and techniques. The Team helps Alchemy participants identify ways to keep their own camps clean and is also the lead organizer for post-festival site recovery.

=== Placement ===
The Placement and Theme Camp team plans and maps out the city. Participants apply, and the team places theme camps, villages, and hamlets in requested areas whenever possible and feasible.

=== Rangers ===
Rangers are primarily concerned with safety issues, maintaining the community's standards, and helping people resolve conflicts. They help participants solve their own problems using non-confrontational mediation. Rangers do not have any special authority; what they do have is specific training and resources that enable them to deal with situations and scenarios beyond the scope of a non-Ranger participant. They are Rangers because they're who volunteered to take the training, wear the T-shirt and be available to help their community. Rangers know it is not about them, it's about their fellow participant and community.

=== Tear Down ===
The Tear Down Team is responsible for ensuring that all FAI-owned tools, equipment, and infrastructure are taken down and properly stored in the Alchemy storage container. Alchemy Public Works used to perform this function, but a separate team was created when the job became too much for just one team.

=== Temple ===
The Temple team is responsible for designing and constructing the Alchemy temple. The temples tend to be smaller than the effigies. The Temple team strives to create a structure and atmosphere that facilitates reflection and contemplation. Participants will often leave written messages, trinkets, or other items important to their past on the temple for them to be burned. Unlike the Burning Man and other regional burn event temples, Alchemy's temple is burned at sunrise on Sunday morning.

=== Volunteers ===
The Volunteer Team helps organize all the team volunteers that help Alchemy operate on a day-to-day basis. The team helps find people to fill teams, as well as assists in finding volunteer opportunities for people who want to help but aren't exactly sure how. All volunteers are funneled through the Volunteer Team. The Volunteer Team also manages the Alchemy website's volunteer signup and management system.

=== Paid Services ===
While Event Leads, Team Leads, and team volunteers are not paid, the EC does contract out specific services:

- Portable Potties
- Radios
- Golf Carts
- Wood Delivery
- Gate Staff
- Security Team
- Heavy equipment rental
- Pyrotechnics
- Emergency medical services

These services require licensed, insured professionals or have significant equipment and infrastructure requirements that would otherwise be over-burdensome for FAI or the EC to procure. For example, the pyrotechnics utilized for the effigy burn require licensed professionals to set up both for safety purposes and to ensure compliance with local and state laws.

== Financial Disclosures, 2025 ==
On June 20, 2025 Flashpoint Artists Initiative provided updates to the burn community via social media, website and email about the financial health of the organization with the publication of two documents. The Financial Statement listed 2025 Total Income at $437,992 and Total Expenses at $489,359. Total assets were listed as $260,948 with $52,000 in total liabilities. The reports also provided details on the failure of FAI to pay state and federal income taxes from 2019 to 2023, and a failure to pay Georgia sales tax in 2022 and 2023.

The Tax Delinquency report states that the failure to pay taxes resulted in $43,065 in penalties and interest, and notes that several members of the leadership team sought to delay the publication of the two reports to the general public when the reports were presented to the board at the April 17, 2025 board meeting.

The Financial Report ends on a positive note by stating:

"As noted in the Execute Review, the year ahead looks good for FAI. We expect the 2025 event will run with similar ticket sale and attendance numbers. . Inflation continues to push expense costs up in some areas (notably: event insurance and venue fees), but careful budgeting by the event team will account for this. We have sufficient assets in the bank to cover pre-event cash flow needs, and to mitigate any financial risk related to running the event. The years ahead may pose challenges, but we are well prepared to meet them."
