= Alchemiya =

Streaming service

Alchemiya Media Limited
- Website type: Private
- Headquarters: Wood Green, London
- Country of origin: United Kingdom
- CEO: Navid Akhtar
- Key people: David Horne (CFO)
- Website: alchemiya.com
- Registration: Required

Alchemiya is a streaming service geared towards Muslim audiences. Based out of the United Kingdom, it offers content mainly in English: feature films, short films, documentaries along with its own produced content. Alchemiya has been dubbed the "Muslim Netflix".

== Overview ==
Alchemiya was founded in 2015 by Navid Akhtar and Ajmal Masroor. Akhtar had previously worked for 20 years in the UK broadcasting industry, including for the BBC and Channel 4. Masroor is a London-based imam, who currently serves as the company's communication officer.

The founders of Alchemiya were motivated by a desire to counter negative perceptions of Muslims. One complaint was that Netflix productions often depicted Muslims as terrorists. Instead, Alchemiya intends to showcase the lifestyle and diversity of the world's 1.6 billion Muslims and the positive contributions of Islam. The initiative was praised by Ibrahim Hooper and Hamza Yusuf.

In 2015, it started a funding campaign on Crowdcube, a British crowdfunding website. It offered only 2 per cent of equity, keeping 98% per cent for the founders, and non-voting stock. Alchemiya managed to obtain 72 investors and raise 81 per cent of their goal.

Alchemiya aims to capture the Muslim entertainment market. According to The Global State of the Economy Report 2017/18 from Thomson Reuters, Muslims spent $198 billion on entertainment in 2016, a figure that is forecasted to reach $281 billion by 2022.

Alchemiya has gone through three investment rounds; the first two garnered generated $282,000 in investment.

Alchemiya offers video on demand service to 90 million mobile phone users via carriers. Carriers include Axiata, which delivers its content in Indonesia, Bangladesh and Malaysia, and Pakistan Telecommunication. Alchemiya videos are also available via Amazon Prime.

The company has also launched an online journal, The Alchemist's Notebook, which produces articles that contextualize its content. Examples include articles on the Pakistani film industry or the Turkish drama sector.

== Content ==
Alchemiya features a variety of content, mostly in English. Offerings include feature films from the Middle East, short films and documentaries. It also features lifestyle content, including shows on cooking and arts, and travelers guides. In addition, some films shown are banned in their countries of origin; one example is a documentary on the Bangladesh Liberation War.

Alchemiya also produces its own content; one of its popular productions was the documentary I Heart Quran.

As of March 2021, the website currently had 650–700 pieces of content, with short-term plans of acquiring another 2,000 pieces.

== Customer base ==
Alchemiya has subscribers in at least 40 countries, but most are in the United States and the United Kingdom. A 2016 survey indicated that about 10% of its subscribers were non-Muslim. Alchemiya finds its audience through social media advertising.
