= USS Greensboro =

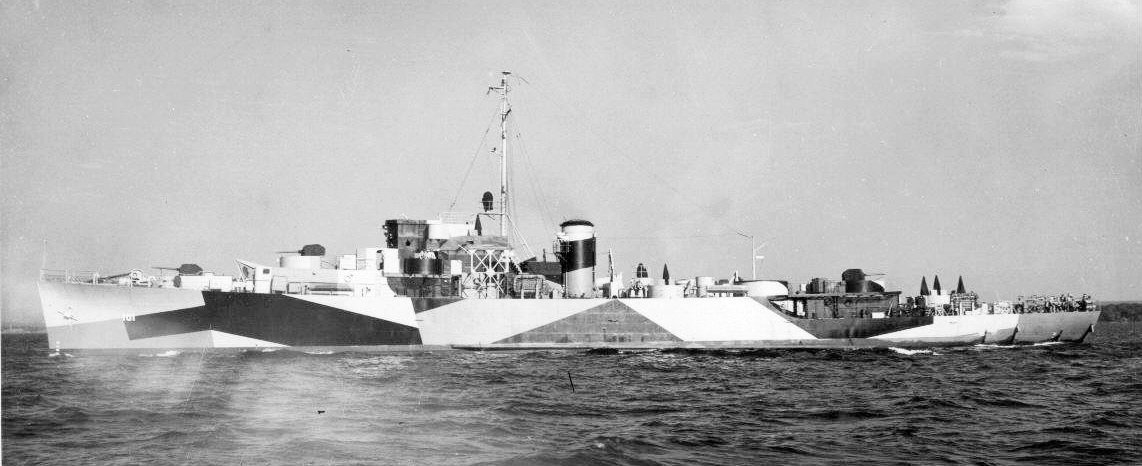
- USS Greensboro (PF-101)

History

United States
- Name: Greensboro
- Namesake: City of Greensboro, North Carolina
- Builder: American Shipbuilding Company, Lorain, Ohio
- Launched: 9 February 1944
- Sponsored by: Mrs. C. I. Carlson
- Commissioned: 29 January 1945
- Decommissioned: 14 March 1946
- Reclassified: From patrol gunboat, PG-209, to patrol frigate, PF-101, 15 April 1943
- Stricken: 23 April 1947
- Fate: Sold for scrapping 22 April 1948

General characteristics
- Class & type: Tacoma-class frigate
- Displacement: 1,264 long tons (1,284 t)
- Length: 303 ft 11 in (92.63 m)
- Beam: 37 ft 11 in (11.56 m)
- Draft: 13 ft 8 in (4.17 m)
- Propulsion: 2 × 5,500 shp (4,101 kW) turbines; 3 boilers; 2 shafts
- Speed: 20 knots (37 km/h; 23 mph)
- Complement: 190
- Armament: 3 × 3"/50 dual purpose guns (3x1); 4 × 40 mm guns (2×2); 9 × 20 mm guns (9×1); 1 × Hedgehog anti-submarine mortar; 8 × Y-gun depth charge projectors; 2 × Depth charge tracks

USS Greensboro (PF-101) was a United States Navy Tacoma-class frigate in commission from 1945 to 1946.

== Construction and commissioning ==
Greensboro originally was authorized as a patrol gunboat with the hull number PG-209, but she was redesignated as a patrol frigate with the hull number PF-101 on 15 April 1943. She was laid down under a Maritime Commission contract as Maritime Commission Hull 1973 by the American Shipbuilding Company at Lorain, Ohio. She was launched on 9 February 1944, sponsored by Mrs. C. I. Carlson, and was commissioned on 29 January 1945 at the United States Coast Guard Yard at Curtis Bay, Baltimore, Maryland, with a United States Coast Guard crew.

== Service history ==
=== World War II, 1945 ===
Greensboro remained at Curtis Bay, undergoing outfitting and conversion for weather patrol duty. On 14 February 1945 she cleared Baltimore Harbor for Bermuda via Norfolk, Virginia, for shakedown, then performed escort duties on voyages to Guantanamo Bay, Cuba, and Kingston, Jamaica.

Greensboro arrived at Boston, Massachusetts, on 23 March 1945 for further conversion to an air-sea rescue and weather patrol ship. Departing Boston on 11 April 1945, she conducted antisubmarine warfare exercises out of Casco Bay, Maine, en route to Naval Station Argentia, Newfoundland, where she arrived on 22 April 1945. She performed air-sea rescue and weather patrol duty, with occasional escort missions, operating out of Newfoundland, the Azores and Recife, Brazil, until February 1946.

=== Decommissioning and disposal ===
Greensboro returned to Boston on 17 February 1946 and remained there until she decommissioned on 14 March 1946. Her name was stricken from the Navy List on 23 April 1947 and she was sold for scrapping on 22 April 1948 to the Southern Shipbuilding Company of New Orleans, Louisiana.
