= AlchemyAPI =

- Type: Subsidiary
- Industry: natural language processing, computer vision, big data
- Founded: 2005
- Defunct: 2020
- Fate: Acquired by IBM and assimilated into its Watson line of API products
- Headquarters: Denver
- Key people: Elliot Turner (CEO)

AlchemyAPI was a software company in the field of machine learning. Its technology employed deep learning for various applications in natural language processing, such as semantic text analysis and sentiment analysis, as well as computer vision. AlchemyAPI offered both traditionally-licensed software products as well API access under a Software as a service model. After acquisition by IBM in 2015, the products were integrated into the Watson line of products and the brand name eventually disappeared.

== Technology and business model ==
As the name suggests, the business model of charging for access to an API was central to the company's identity and uncommon for its time: A TechCrunch article highlighted that even though the technology was similar to IBM's Watson, the pay-per-use model made it more accessible, especially to non-enterprise customers. At one point, AlchemyAPI served over 3 billion API calls per month.

== History ==
AlchemyAPI was founded by Elliot Turner in 2005, and launched their API in 2009.

In September 2011, ProgrammableWeb added AlchemyAPI to its API Billionaires Club, alongside giants such as Google and Facebook.

In February 2013, it was announced that AlchemyAPI had raised US$2 million to improve the capabilities of its deep learning technology. In September 2013, it was reported that AlchemyAPI had created a Google Glass app that could identify what a person was looking at, and that AlchemyAPI would soon be rolling out deep learning-based image recognition as a service.

As of February 2014 (prior to the IBM acquisition), it claimed to have clients in 36 countries and process over 3 billion documents a month. In May 2014, it was reported that AlchemyAPI had released a computer vision API known as AlchemyVision, capable of recognizing objects in photographs and providing image similarity search capabilities.

In March 2015, it was announced that AlchemyAPI had been acquired by IBM and the company's breakthroughs in deep learning would accelerate IBM's development of next generation cognitive computing applications. IBM reported plans to integrate AlchemyAPI's deep learning technology into the core Watson platform

== Media coverage ==
A February 2013 article in VentureBeat about big data named AlchemyAPI as one of the primary forces responsible for bringing natural language processing capabilities to the masses. In November 2013, GigaOm listed AlchemyAPI as one of the top startups working in deep learning, along with Cortica and Ersatz.
