= Mad River Valley Rural Historic District =

Historic district in Vermont, United States

- U.S. National Register of Historic Places
- U.S. Historic district
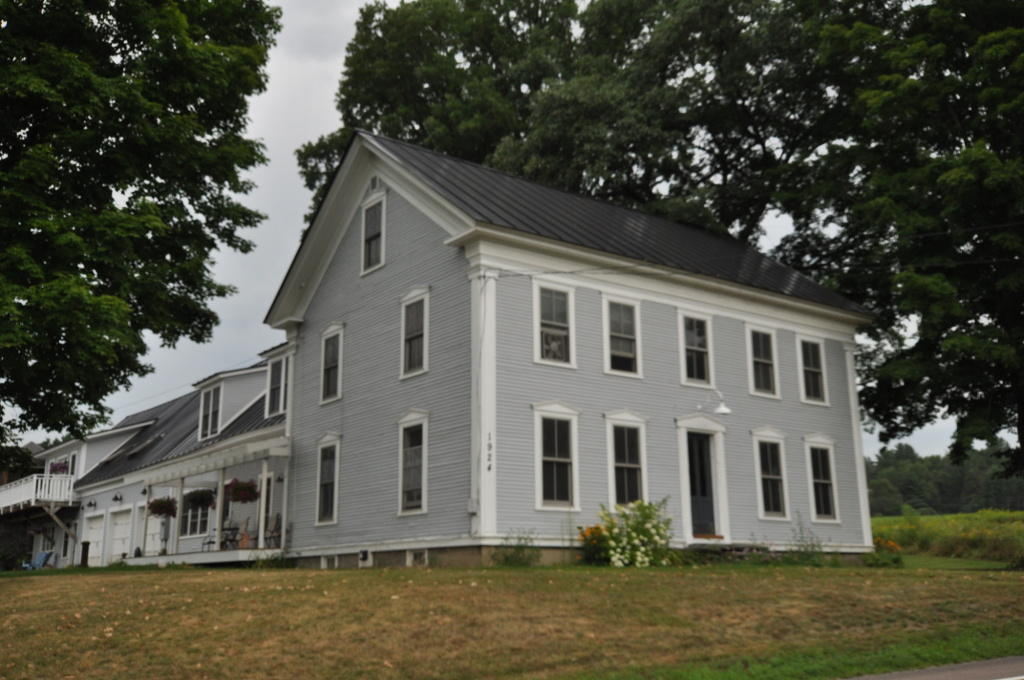
- Farmhouse on VT 100

- Location within Vermont Location within the United States
- Location: Roughly, along VT 100 and 100B, and parts of North and River Rds., Waitsfield and Moretown, Vermont
- Coordinates: 44°13′16″N 72°47′29″W
- Area: 1,400 acres (570 ha)
- Architectural style: Greek Revival, Gothic Revival
- MPS: Mad River Valley MPS
- NRHP reference No.: 94000836
- Added to NRHP: August 5, 1994

The Mad River Valley Rural Historic District encompasses a large rural landscape in northern Waitsfield and southern Moretown, Vermont. Encompassing some 1,400 acres (570 ha) of bottom lands on either side of the Mad River, the area has seen active agricultural use since the late 18th century, and retains a number of mid-19th century farmsteads. The district was listed on the National Register of Historic Places in 1994.

== Description and history ==
Vermont's Mad River is a north-flowing tributary of the Winooski River, which feeds Lake Champlain at Burlington. The historic district, with the river meandering through its middle is roughly bounded on the east by North Road, the west by Vermont Route 100, and the south by Tremblay Road. Its northern boundary is roughly Downsville Brook, an east-flowing tributary in Moretown. This area is one of the broader stretches of the river's flood plain, bounded at the northern and southern ends by terrain that narrows the river's passage. It is roughly bisected by Meadow Road, which crosses the river at one of the area's oldest crossing sites.

This section of the Mad River valley was populated in the 1780s by white settlers, drawn by its agricultural potential. The earliest road, roughly North Road to the Meadow Road crossing, was laid out by 1796, and the Mad River Turnpike (now Vermont Route 100, and Route 100B from their junction) was opened in 1807. Early farmers were generally diversified in their early production, and had begun focusing on cattle and Morgan horses by the mid-19th century. With the introduction of the railroad in a neighboring valley, and the development of refrigerated rail cars later in the 19th century, the area's farmers turned to the production of butter. It is during this period that many of the area farmsteads achieved their present form, although many of the active ones have had modern facilities added. Prominent examples of farmsteads are found on Vermont 100 and North Road, generally set outside the flood plain, because the river has historically flooded on numerous occasions.

== See also ==
- National Register of Historic Places listings in Washington County, Vermont
