= Rob Mermin =

American clown

Rob Mermin is the founder of the award-winning international touring youth circus Circus Smirkus.

== Biography ==
Rob Mermin grew up in a lively Jewish family, and in 1969 Mermin ran off to join the circus. He clowned with various European circuses including England's Circus Hoffman, Sweden's Cirkus Scott, Denmark's Circus Benneweis in the Circus Building by the Tivoli, the Hungarian Magyar State Cirkusz, and circus palaces throughout the former Soviet Union. His formal training includes mime with masters Marcel Marceau and Etienne Decroux, and a degree in Drama and Literature from Lake Forest College in 1971. He is former Dean of the Ringling Bros. and Barnum & Bailey Clown College, and President of Blackfriar's Summer Theater. In 1987 Mermin founded Circus Smirkus in Greensboro, Vermont.

=== Awards ===
Mermin's awards include Copenhagen's Gold Clown; Vermont's Bessie Award; Best Director Prize at the International Circus Festival on Russia's Black Sea; the Lund Family Center's "It Takes A Village" Award; the Vermont Arts Council Award of Merit; Lake Forest College's Outstanding Alumni Leadership Award; and the 2008 Vermont Governor's Award for Excellence in the Arts.

=== Personal ===
As of 2016, Mermin resides in Montpelier, Vermont. He is Jewish.
