= List of Vermont locations by per capita income =

Vermont has the twenty-fifth-highest per capita income in the United States of America, at $20,625 (2000). Its personal per capita income is $30,740 (2003).

== Vermont counties ranked by per capita income ==
Note: Data is from the 2010 United States Census Data and the 2006-2010 American Community Survey 5-Year Estimates.

Rank	County	Per capita income	Median household income	Median family income	Population	Number of households
1	Chittenden	$31,095	$59,878	$78,283	156,545	61,827
2	Grand Isle	$30,499	$57,436	$66,686	6,970	2,902
3	Windsor	$29,053	$50,893	$63,387	56,670	24,753
4	Washington	$28,337	$55,313	$66,968	59,534	25,027
5	Bennington	$27,962	$47,396	$60,642	37,125	15,470
	Vermont	$27,478	$51,841	$64,135	625,741	256,442
	United States	$27,334	$51,914	$62,982	308,745,538	116,716,292
6	Windham	$27,247	$46,714	$58,814	44,513	19,290
7	Lamoille	$27,164	$52,232	$62,364	24,475	10,014
8	Addison	$26,599	$55,800	$67,721	36,821	14,084
9	Orange	$25,951	$52,079	$61,221	28,936	11,887
10	Rutland	$25,426	$47,027	$58,790	61,642	25,984
11	Franklin	$24,767	$53,623	$63,009	47,746	18,513
12	Caledonia	$22,504	$42,706	$51,503	31,227	12,553
13	Orleans	$20,652	$40,202	$48,845	27,231	11,320
14	Essex	$20,040	$37,734	$46,263	6,306	2,818
