= Vermont Beer Makers =

American brewery

Coordinates: 43.3015°N 72.4870°W

- Industry: Alcoholic beverage
- Founded: 1996
- Headquarters: Springfield, Vermont; United States
- Products: Beer
- Owner: Current: Kelen Beardsley, Gabriel Streeter; Previously Owned by: Dan Gates, Laura Gate and Trevor Billings.

Originally called Trout River Brewing, Vermont Beer Makers is a brewery that was originally located in Lyndonville, Vermont, US. It began production in July 1996, and closed in November 2014.

In November 2014, the brewery was moved to Springfield, Vermont by its current owners. Beer distribution started again in April 2016.

In July 2020, the brewery rebranded Vermont Beer Makers, with Trevor Billings stepping away from the business.
