= Heady Topper =

India Pale Ale brewed in Waterbury, Vermont

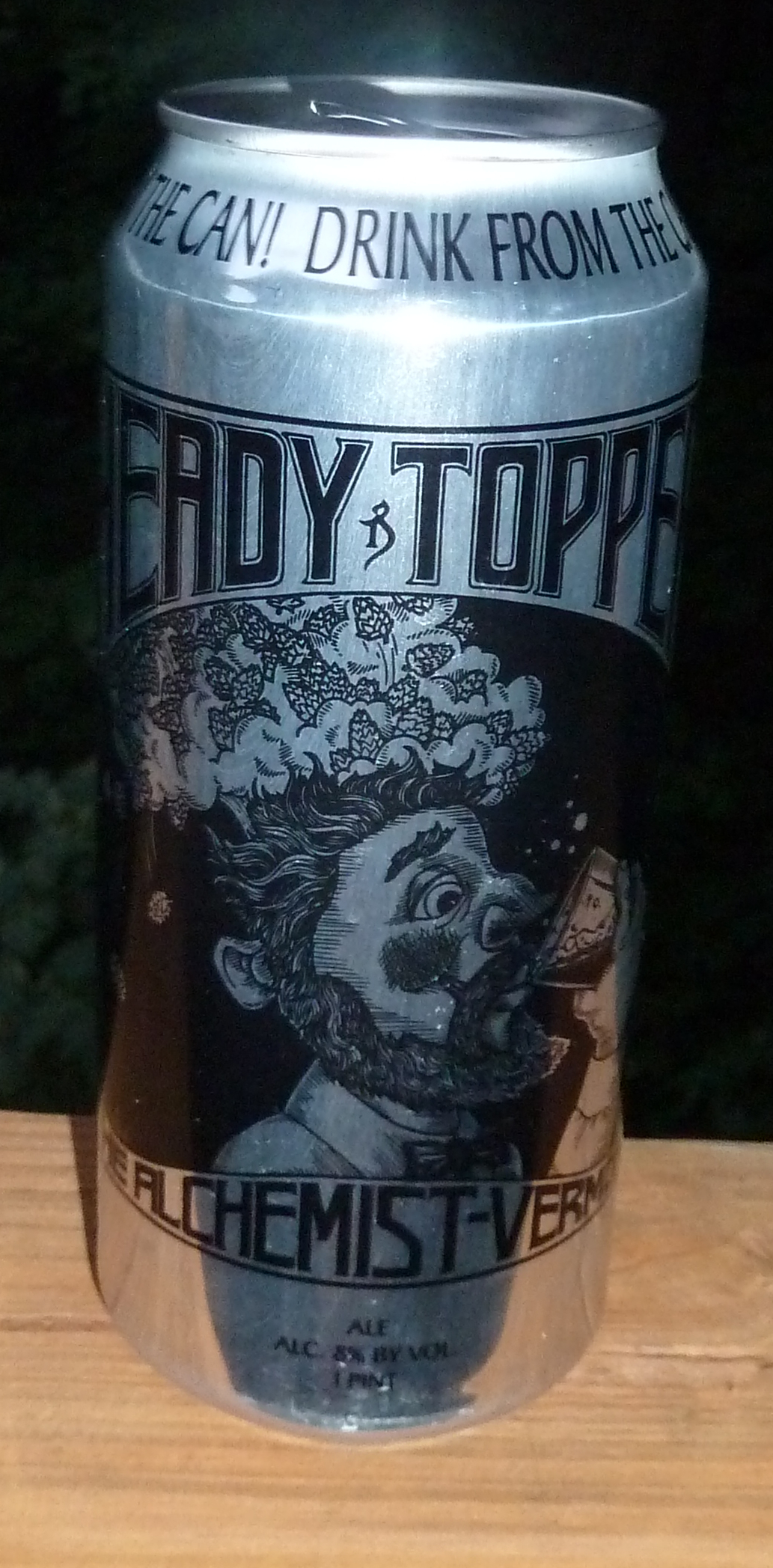
Customers are urged to drink directly from the Heady Topper can.

Heady Topper is a double India Pale Ale brewed by The Alchemist primarily in Waterbury, Vermont and in Stowe, Vermont. It is unfiltered and contains 8% ABV. The Alchemist describes Heady Topper as having flavors of orange, tropical fruit, pink grapefruit, pine, and spice. Unpasteurized, it is kept refrigerated by authorized retailers until point of sale. It has been described as "a complex web of genius", and as of August 2018, it was rated the fourth best beer in the world by Beer Advocate.

== Overview ==
At the beginning of 2013, production was 1,200 cases a week with plans to expand to 1,800 during the following summer. As of 2018, The Alchemist brews 10,000 barrels of Heady Topper per year out of their Waterbury plant. Heady Topper has gained a reputation locally throughout New England, and its reputation has been spread nationally and internationally. In the lead-up to the 2016 Democratic National Convention, The Atlantic reported that contender Bernie Sanders had "been photographed proudly holding a can of Heady Topper". In an article published by the UK's Esquire, journalist Michael Smith commented about Heady Topper that it was "so in-demand [that] [t]hey don't even get out of the brewery, let alone the country. Brewed in tiny quantities, they excite such hysteria that on the day of release buyers queue around the brewery fence: by lunchtime all the fresh beer's sold". Local establishments, including the brewery itself, have imposed limits to how many four-packs can be purchased per customer. The beer is sometimes referred to as "The Heady" by regular followers of The Alchemist brewery.

In November 2013, The Alchemist closed their retail shop citing traffic and public access issues, and moved to a larger space in Stowe, Vermont on June 30, 2016. The new, larger brewery and retail space opened the same day. However, The Alchemist continues to primarily brew Heady Topper at their Waterbury location.

== History ==
John Kimmich came to Vermont in 1994 to learn the craft beer industry from Greg Noonan. He worked as head brewer at Vermont Pub and Brewery in Burlington, VT., where he met his future wife, Jen. Together they opened The Alchemist as a brew pub in Waterbury in November 2003, with Heady Topper an occasional offering. After customers began illegally taking Heady Topper offsite, Kimmich began bottling the ale. The Kimmichs started the production brewery in August 2011, and Hurricane Irene destroyed the pub the same month. Despite no marketing effort outside of Vermont, it grew in popularity through personal recommendations and craft beer websites.
