= Greg Noonan =

American brewer

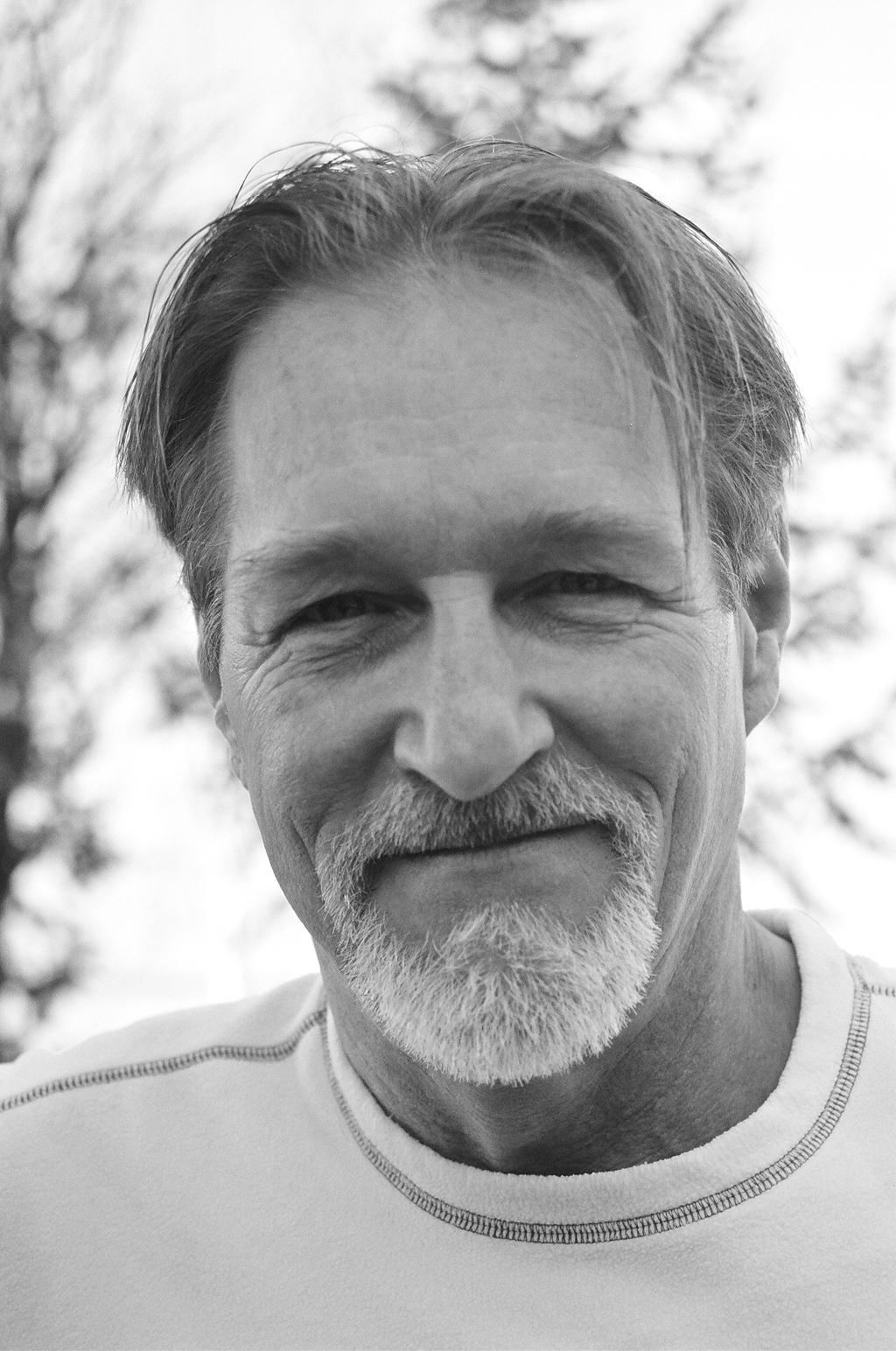
Greg Noonan, Author

Gregory "Greg" John Noonan (March 4, 1951 – October 11, 2009) was an American brewing expert who wrote several published books on brewing. His writing credits include Brewing Lager Beer: The Most Comprehensive Book for Home - And Microbrewers (1986) which he updated in 1996 and changed the title to New Brewing Lager Beer: The Most Comprehensive Book for Home - And Microbrewers. He also wrote Scotch Ale (1993) for the Classic Beer Styles Series from Brewers Publications. He co-authored Seven Barrel Brewery Brewers Handbook (1997) with Mikel Redman and Scott Russell.

Noonan was the owner and brewmaster of Vermont Pub and Brewery since 1988.

Noonan was a National Judge in the Beer Judge Certification Program.

On October 11, 2009, Noonan died after a short illness with lung cancer.

== Awards ==
In 1997, Noonan received the Recognition Award from the American Homebrewers Association.

In 2004, Noonan was awarded the Achievement Award from The Brewers Association and then the following year (2005) the Russell Schehrer Award for Innovation in Brewing also from The Brewers Association.
