= Greensboro Bend, Vermont =

Census-designated place in Vermont, United States

- Census-designated place
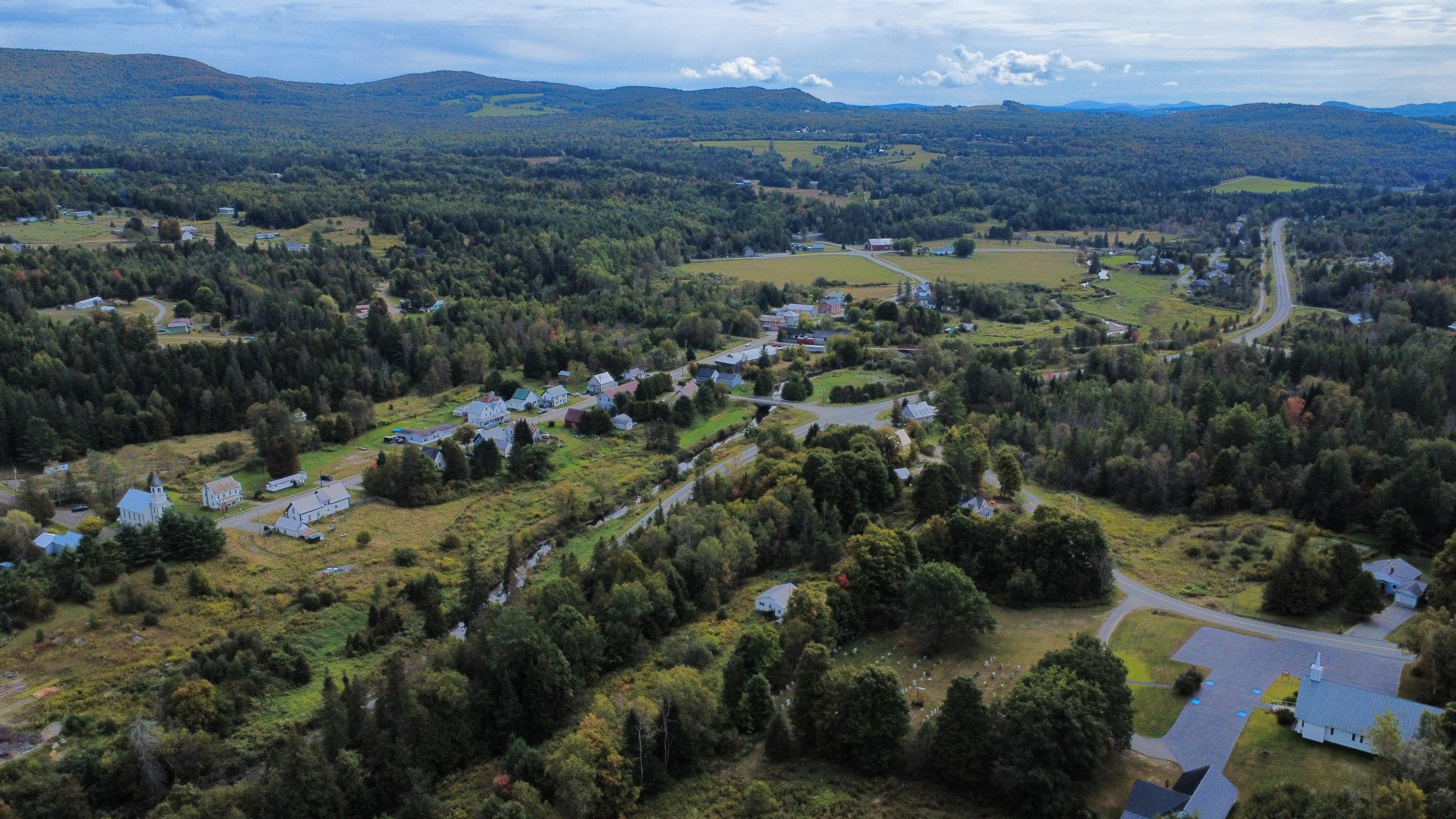
- Greensboro Bend, VT, from the north

- Location within Vermont Location within the United States
- Coordinates: 44°33′48″N 72°15′23″W
- Country: United States
- State: Vermont
- County: Orleans

Area
  - Total: 2.228 sq mi (5.77 km^{2})
  - Land: 2.210 sq mi (5.72 km^{2})
  - Water: 0.018 sq mi (0.047 km^{2})
- Elevation: 1,312 ft (400 m)

Population (2010)
  - Total: 232
  - Density: 105/sq mi (40.5/km^{2})
- Time zone: UTC-5 (Eastern (EST))
  - Summer (DST): UTC-4 (EDT)
- ZIP code: 05842
- Area code: 802
- GNIS feature ID: 2586634

Greensboro Bend is a census-designated place in the town of Greensboro, Orleans County, Vermont, United States. As of the 2020 census, Greensboro Bend had a population of 237.
