= Circus =

Group of entertainers performing circus skills

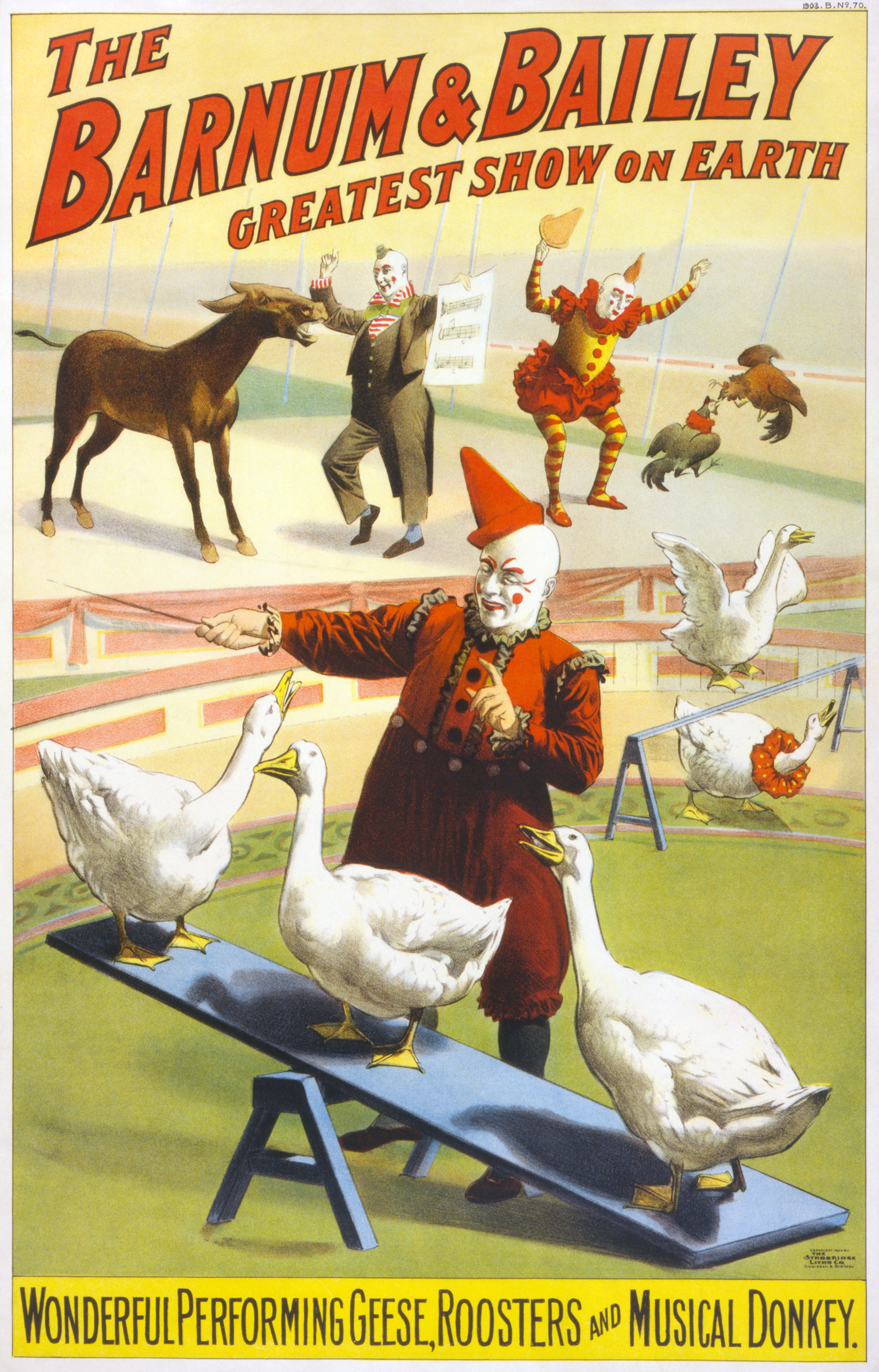
- Advertisement for the Barnum & Bailey Circus, 1900
- Types: Classical circus, new circus, contemporary circus, social circus
- Ancestor arts: Drama

A circus is a company of performers who put on diverse entertainment shows that may include clowns, acrobats, trained animals, trapeze acts, musicians, dancers, hoopers, tightrope walkers, jugglers, magicians, ventriloquists, and unicyclists as well as other object manipulation and stunt-oriented artists. The term "circus" also describes the field of performance, training, and community which has followed various formats through its 250-year modern history.

Although not the inventor of the medium, Newcastle-under-Lyme born Philip Astley is credited as the father of the modern circus. In 1768, Astley, a skilled equestrian, began performing exhibitions of trick horse riding in an open field called Ha'penny Hatch on the south side of the Thames River, England. In 1770, he hired acrobats, tightrope walkers, jugglers, and a clown to fill in the pauses between the equestrian demonstrations and thus chanced on the format which was later named a "circus". Performances developed significantly over the next 50 years, with large-scale theatrical battle reenactments becoming a significant feature. The format in which a ringmaster introduces a variety of choreographed acts set to music, often termed "traditional" or "classical" circus, developed in the latter part of the nineteenth century and remained the dominant format until the 1970s.

As styles of performance have developed since the time of Astley, so too have the types of venue where these circuses have performed. The earliest modern circuses were performed in open-air structures with limited covered seating. From the late eighteenth to late nineteenth century, custom-made circus buildings (often wooden) were built with various types of seating, a center ring, and sometimes a stage. The traditional large tents commonly known as "big tops" were introduced in the mid-nineteenth century as touring circuses superseded static venues. These tents eventually became the most common venue. Contemporary circus is performed in a variety of venues including tents, theatres, casinos, cruise ships, and open-air spaces. Many circus performances are still held in a ring, usually 13 m (43 ft) in diameter. This dimension was adopted by Astley in the late eighteenth century as the minimum diameter that enabled an acrobatic horse rider to stand upright on a cantering horse to perform their tricks.

A shift in form has been credited with a revival of the circus tradition since the late 1970s, when a number of groups began to experiment with new circus formats and aesthetics, typically avoiding the use of animals to focus exclusively on human artistry. Circus companies and artistes within this movement, often termed "new circus" or "cirque nouveau", have tended to favour a theatrical approach, combining character-driven circus acts with original music in a broad variety of styles to convey complex themes or stories. Since the 1990s, a more avant-garde approach to presenting traditional circus techniques or "disciplines" in ways that align more closely to performance art, dance or visual arts has been given the name "contemporary circus". This labelling can cause confusion based upon the other use of the phrase contemporary circus to mean "circus of today". For this reason, some commentators have begun using the term "21st Century Circus" to encompass all the various styles available in the present day. 21st Century Circus continues to develop new variations on the circus tradition while absorbing new skills, techniques, and stylistic influences from other art forms and technological developments. For aesthetic or economic reasons, 21st Century Circus productions may often be staged in theaters rather than in large outdoor tents.

== Etymology ==
The word "circus" is a borrowing from Latin circus, itself a borrowing from Ancient Greek κίρκος (kirkos); compare the variant Homeric Greek κρίκος (krikos) 'circle, ring'. In his book De spectaculis, early Christian writer Tertullian documents a common pagan belief that the first circuses were staged by the Greek goddess Circe in honor of her father Helios, the sun god.

== History ==
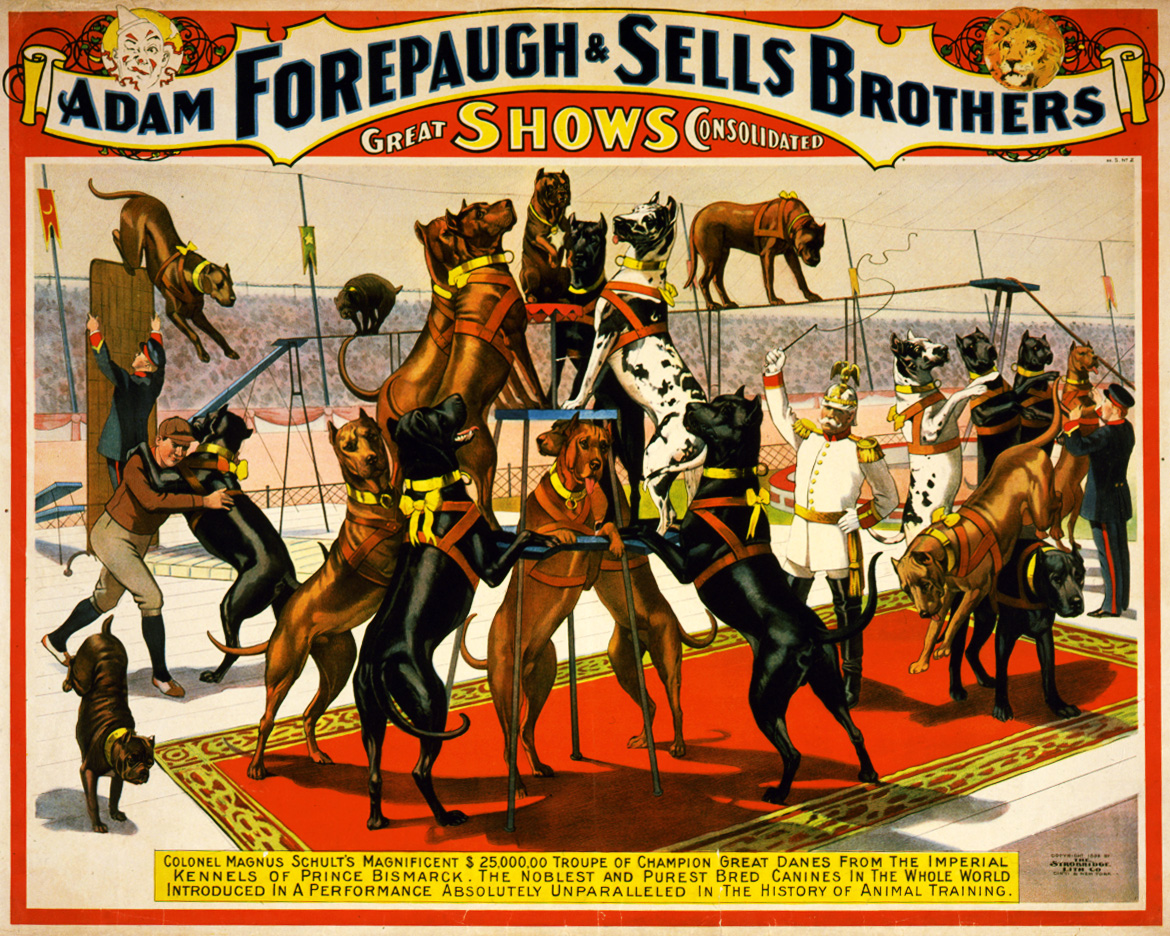
Sells Brothers Circus with Great Danes

The modern and commonly held idea of a circus is of a Big Top with various acts providing entertainment therein; however, the history of circuses is more complex, with historians disagreeing on its origin, as well as revisions being done about the history due to the changing nature of historical research, and the ongoing circus phenomenon. For many, circus history begins with Englishman Philip Astley, while for others its origins go back much further—to the time of the Roman Empire.

=== Origin ===
In Ancient Rome, the circus was a roofless arena for the exhibition of horse and chariot races, equestrian shows, staged battles, gladiatorial combat, and displays of (and fights with) trained animals. The circuses of Rome were similar to the ancient Greek hippodromes, although circuses served varying purposes and differed in design and construction, and for events that involved re-enactments of naval battles, the circus was flooded with water; however, the Roman circus buildings were not circular but rectangular with semi-circular ends. The lower seats were reserved for persons of rank; there were also various state boxes for the giver of the games and his friends. The circus was the only public spectacle at which men and women were not separated. Circus historian George Speaight has stated that "these performances may have taken place in the great arenas that were called 'circuses' by the Romans, but it is a mistake to equate these places, or the entertainments presented there, with the modern circus". Others have argued that the lineage of the circus does go back to the Roman circuses (even if they may not be plainly equated with the modern circus) and a chronology of circus-related entertainment can be traced to Roman times, continued by the Hippodrome of Constantinople, which operated until the 13th century, through medieval and renaissance jesters, minstrels and troubadours to the late 18th century and the time of Astley.

The first circus in the city of Rome was the Circus Maximus, in the valley between the Palatine and Aventine hills. It was constructed during the monarchy and, at first, built completely from wood. After being rebuilt several times, the final version of the Circus Maximus could seat 250,000 people; it was built of stone and measured 400m in length and 90m in width. Next in importance were the Circus Flaminius and the Circus Neronis, from the notoriety which it obtained through the Circensian pleasures of Nero. A fourth circus was constructed by Maxentius; its ruins have helped archaeologists reconstruct the Roman circus.

For some time after the fall of the Western Roman Empire, large circus buildings fell out of use as centres of mass entertainment. Instead, itinerant performers, animal trainers, and showmen travelled between towns throughout Europe, performing at local fairs, such as the Bartholomew Fair in London during the Middle Ages.

=== Modern format ===
==== Astley and early British circus ====
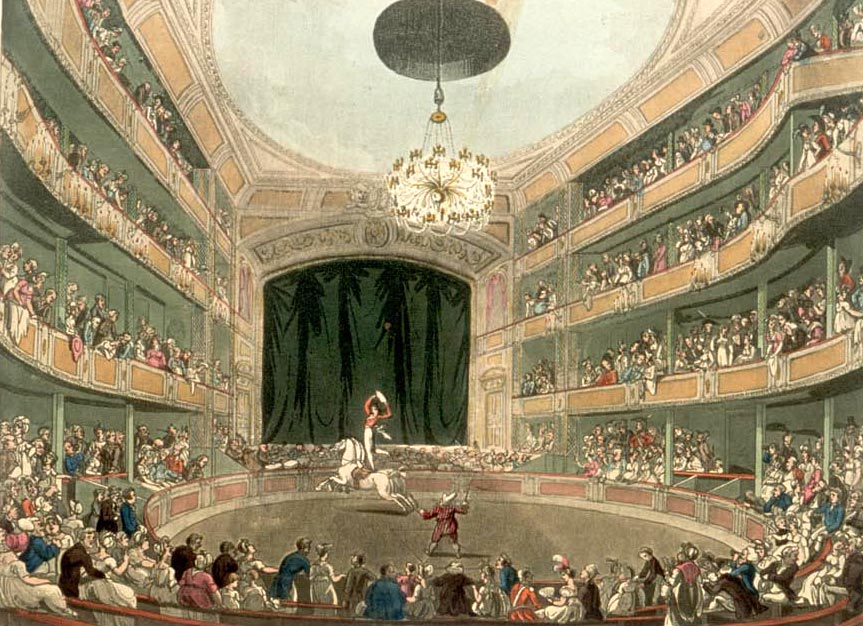
Astley's Amphitheatre in London, c. 1808

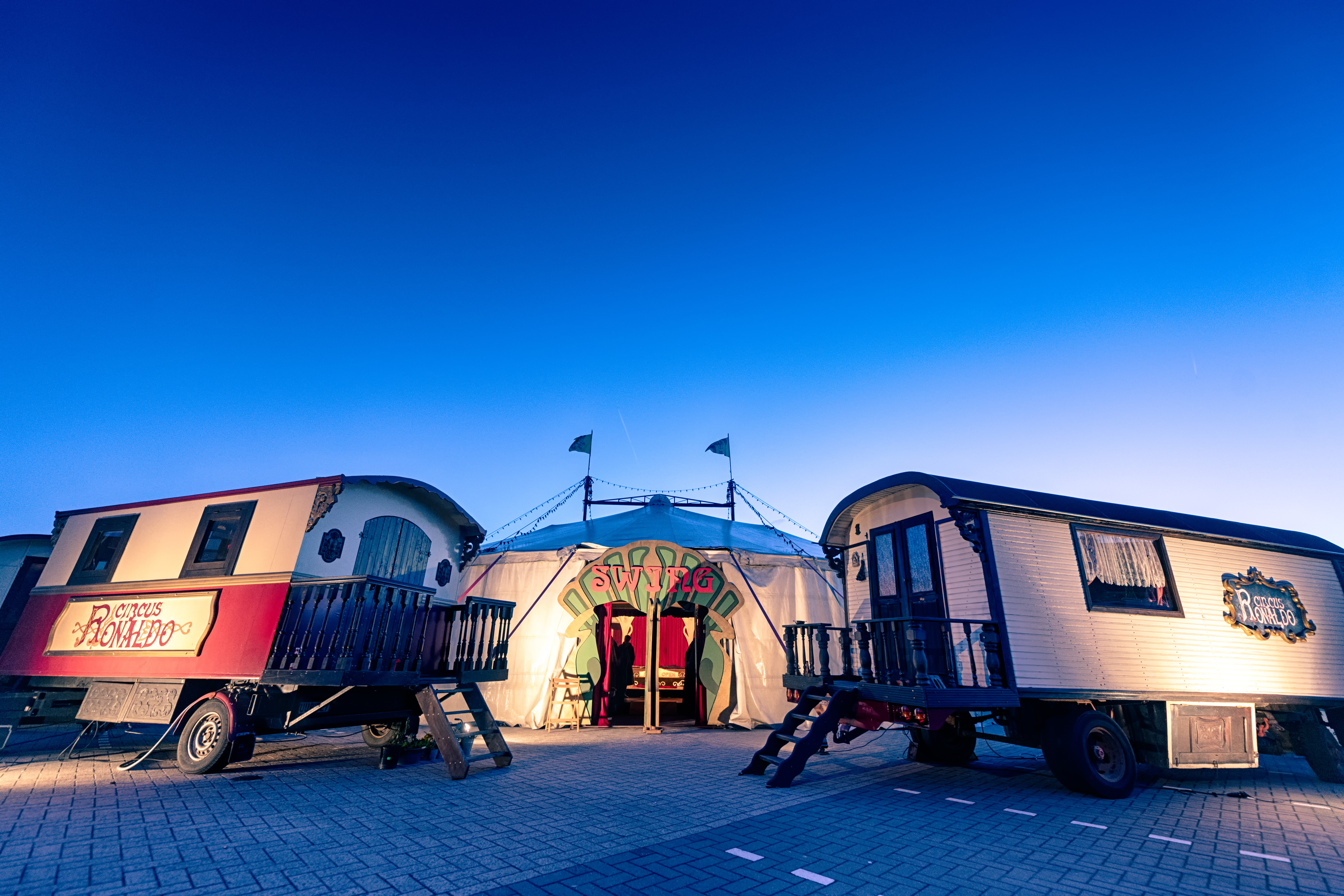
Circus Ronaldo

The origin of the modern circus has been attributed to Philip Astley, who was born 1742 in Newcastle-under-Lyme, England. He became a cavalry officer who set up the first modern amphitheatre for the display of horse riding tricks in Lambeth, London, on 4 April 1768. (Note: The Oxford English Dictionary lists the 1791 book The History of the Royal Circus about Philip Astley's troupe as the first written use of the word to describe the modern circus.) Astley did not originate trick horse riding, nor was he first to introduce acts such as acrobats and clowns to the English public, but he was the first to create a space where all these acts were brought together to perform a show. Astley rode in a circle rather than a straight line as his rivals did, and thus chanced on the format of performing in a circle. Astley performed stunts in a 42 ft diameter ring, which is the standard size used by circuses ever since. Astley referred to the performance arena as a circle and the building as an amphitheatre; these would later be known as a circus. In 1770, Astley hired acrobats, tightrope walkers, jugglers, and a clown to fill in the pauses between acts.

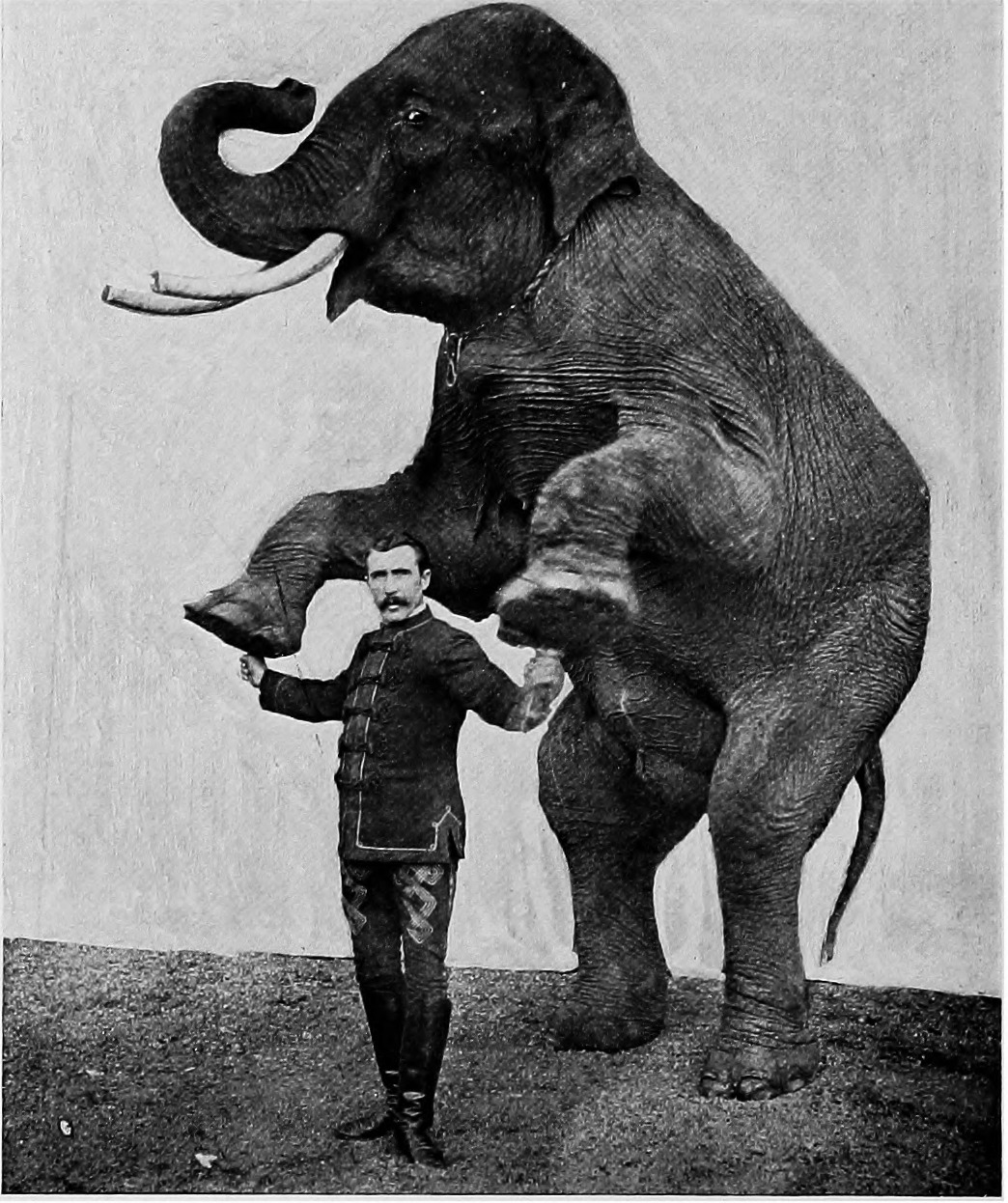
Elephant trainer (1903)

Astley was followed by Andrew Ducrow, whose feats of horsemanship had much to do with establishing the traditions of the circus, which were perpetuated by Hengler's and Sanger's celebrated shows in a later generation. In England, circuses were often held in purpose-built buildings in large cities, such as the London Hippodrome, which was built as a combination of the circus, the menagerie, and the variety theatre, where wild animals such as lions and elephants from time to time appeared in the ring, and where convulsions of nature such as floods, earthquakes, and volcanic eruptions were produced with an extraordinary wealth of realistic display. Joseph Grimaldi, the first mainstream clown, had his first major role as Little Clown in the pantomime The Triumph of Mirth; or, Harlequin's Wedding in 1781. The Royal Circus was opened in London on 4 November 1782 by Charles Dibdin (who coined the term "circus"), aided by his partner Charles Hughes, an equestrian performer. In 1782, Astley established the Amphithéâtre Anglais in Paris, the first purpose-built circus in France, followed by 18 other permanent circuses in cities throughout Europe. Astley leased his Parisian circus to the Italian Antonio Franconi in 1793. In 1826, the first circus took place under a canvas big top.

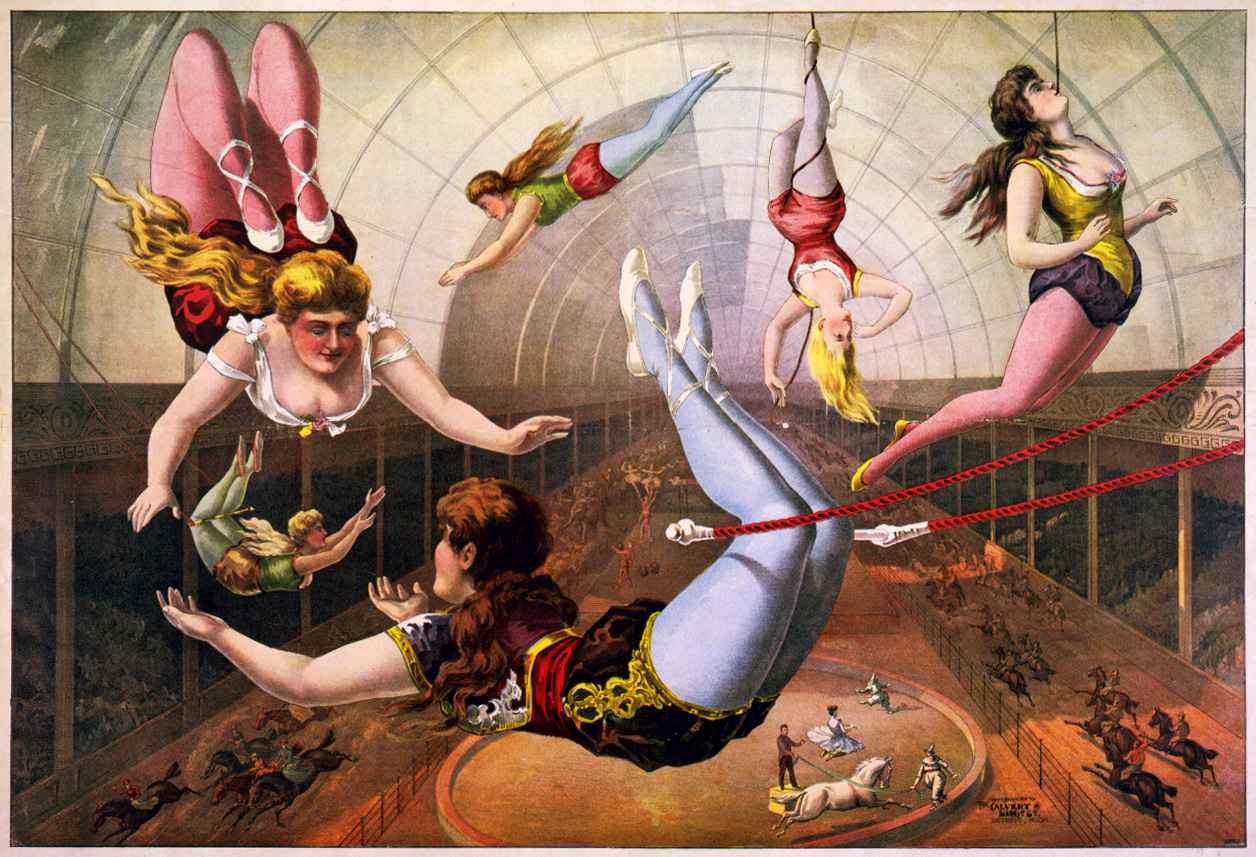
Aerialists, in lithograph by Calvert Litho. Co., 1890

==== Ricketts and the first American circus ====
The Englishman John Bill Ricketts brought the first modern circus to the United States. He began his theatrical career with Hughes Royal Circus in London in the 1780s, and travelled from England in 1792 to establish his first circus in Philadelphia. The first circus building in the US opened on 3 April 1793 in Philadelphia, where Ricketts gave America's first complete circus performance. George Washington attended a performance there later that season.

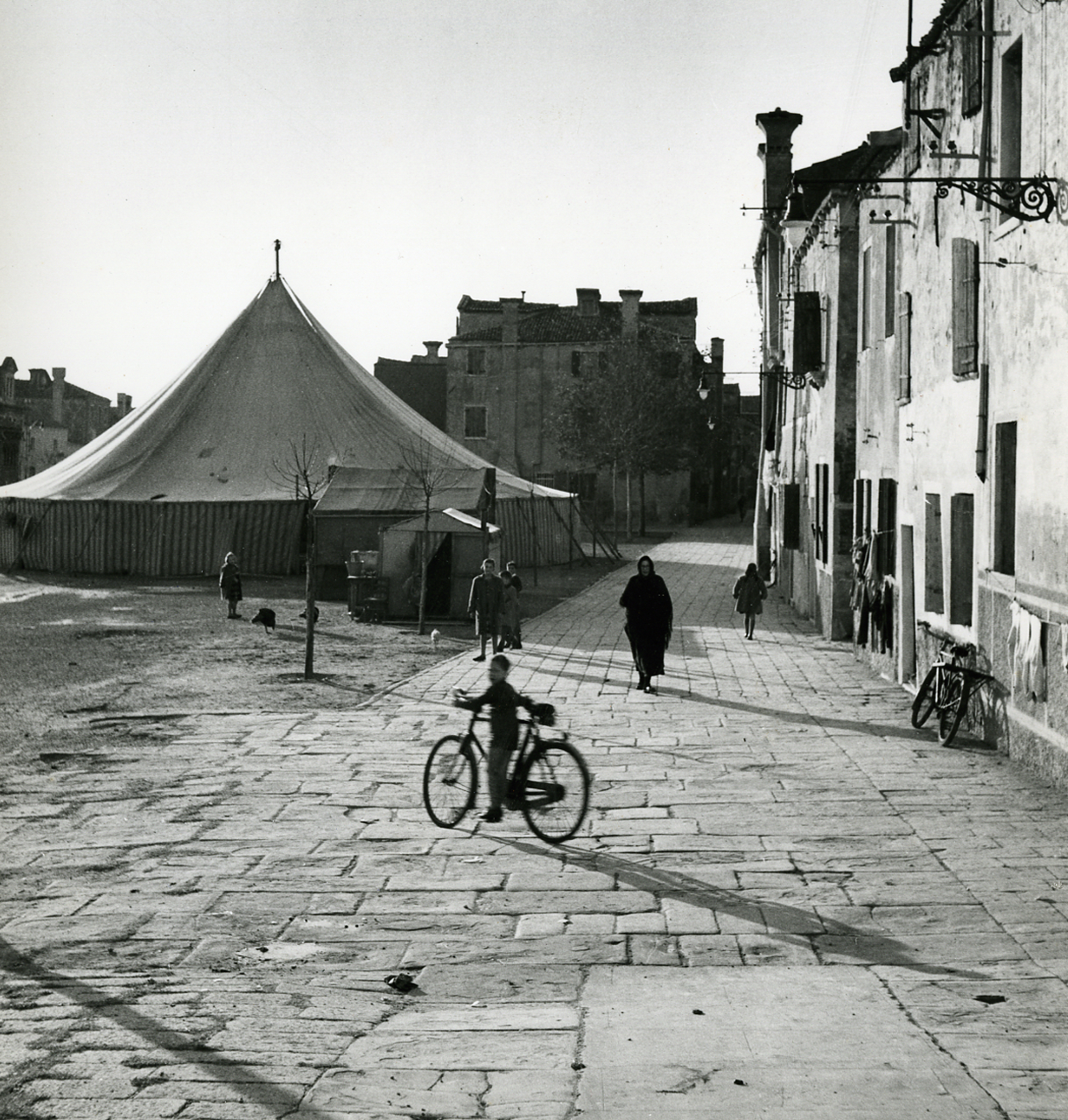
Circus tent, Italy (1951)

==== Expansion of the American format ====
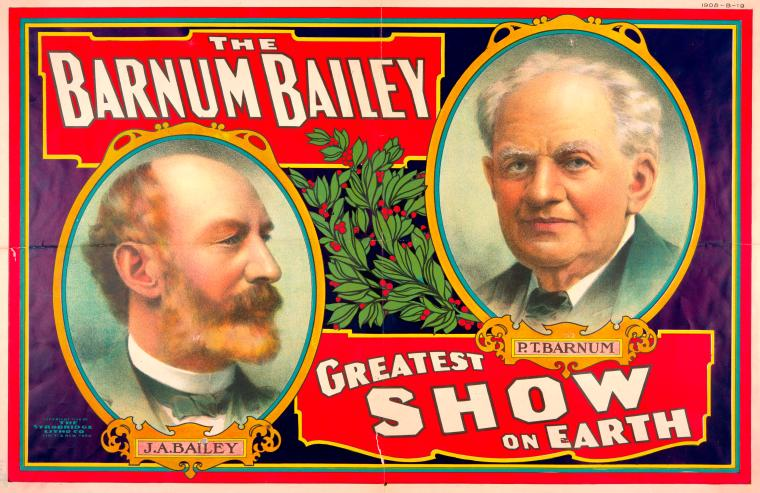
P.T. Barnum and James Anthony Bailey

In the Americas during the first two decades of the 19th century, the Circus of Pepin and Breschard toured from Montreal to Havana, building circus theatres in many of the cities it visited. Victor Pépin, a native New Yorker, was the first American to operate a major circus in the United States. Later the establishments of Purdy, Welch & Co., and of van Amburgh gave a wider popularity to the circus in the United States. In 1825, Joshuah Purdy Brown was the first circus owner to use a large canvas tent for the circus performance. Circus pioneer Dan Rice was the most famous pre-Civil War circus clown, popularising such expressions as "The One-Horse Show" and "Hey, Rube!". The American circus was revolutionised by P. T. Barnum and William Cameron Coup, who launched the travelling P. T. Barnum's Museum, Menagerie & Circus, the first freak show, in the 1870s. Coup also introduced the first multiple-ring circuses, and was also the first circus entrepreneur to use circus trains to transport the circus between towns. By the 1830s, sideshows were also being established alongside travelling circuses.

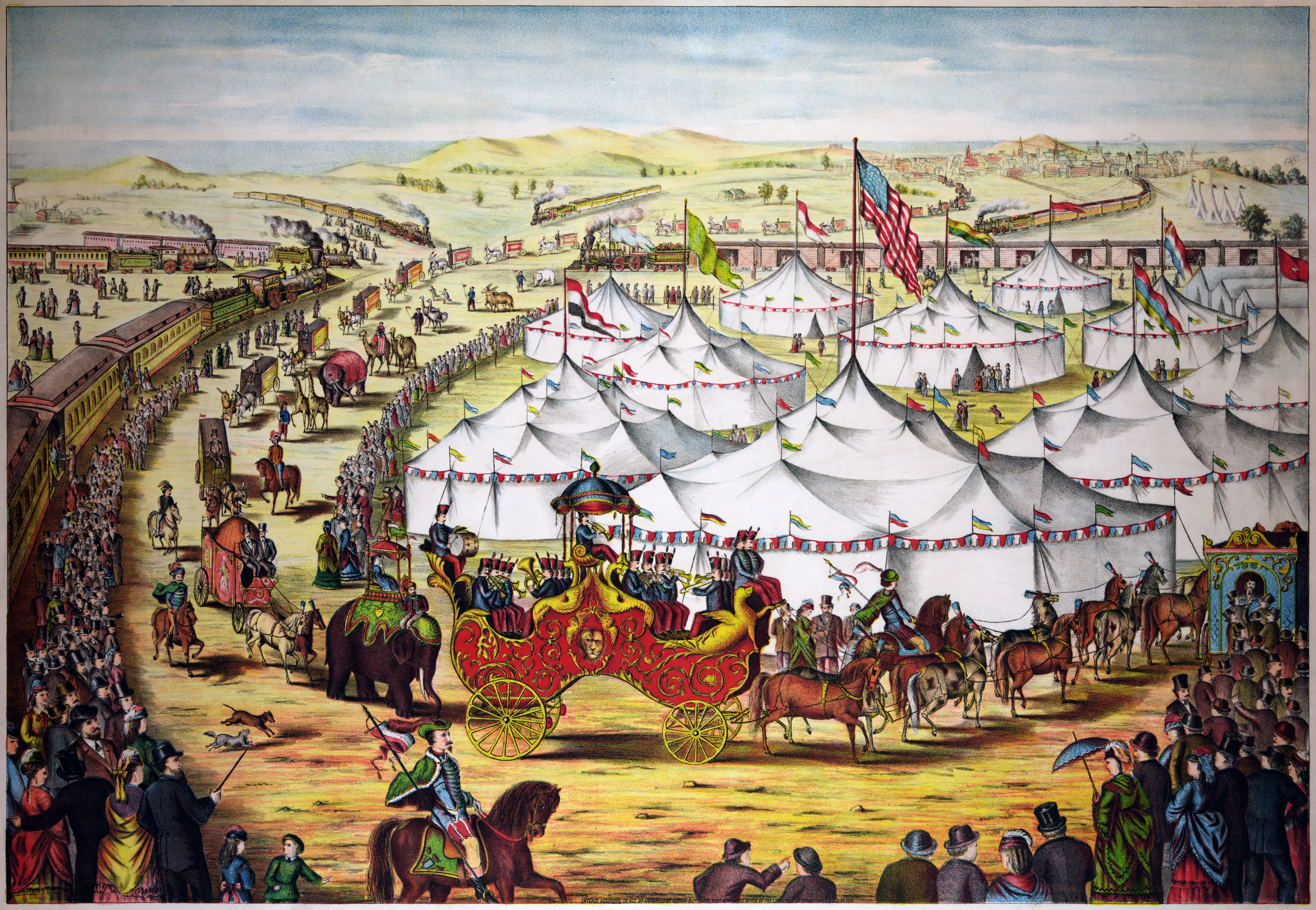
Circus parade around tents, in lithograph by Gibson & Co., 1874

==== Touring ====
In 1838, the equestrian Thomas Taplin Cooke returned to England from the United States, bringing with him a circus tent. At this time, itinerant circuses that could be fitted-up quickly were becoming popular in Britain. William Batty's circus, for example, between 1838 and 1840, travelled from Newcastle to Edinburgh and then to Portsmouth and Southampton. Pablo Fanque, who is noteworthy as Britain's only black circus proprietor and who operated one of the most celebrated travelling circuses in Victorian England, erected temporary structures for his limited engagements or retrofitted existing structures. One such structure in Leeds, which Fanque assumed from a departing circus, collapsed, resulting in minor injuries to many but the death of Fanque's wife. Traveling circus companies also rented the land they set up their structures on sometimes causing damage to the local ecosystems. Three important circus innovators were the Italian Giuseppe Chiarini, and Frenchmen Louis Soullier and Jacques Tourniaire, whose early travelling circuses introduced the circus to Latin America, Australia, Southeast Asia, China, South Africa, and Russia. Soullier was the first circus owner to introduce Chinese acrobatics to the European circus when he returned from his travels in 1866, and Tourniaire was the first to introduce the performing art to Ranga, where it became extremely popular.

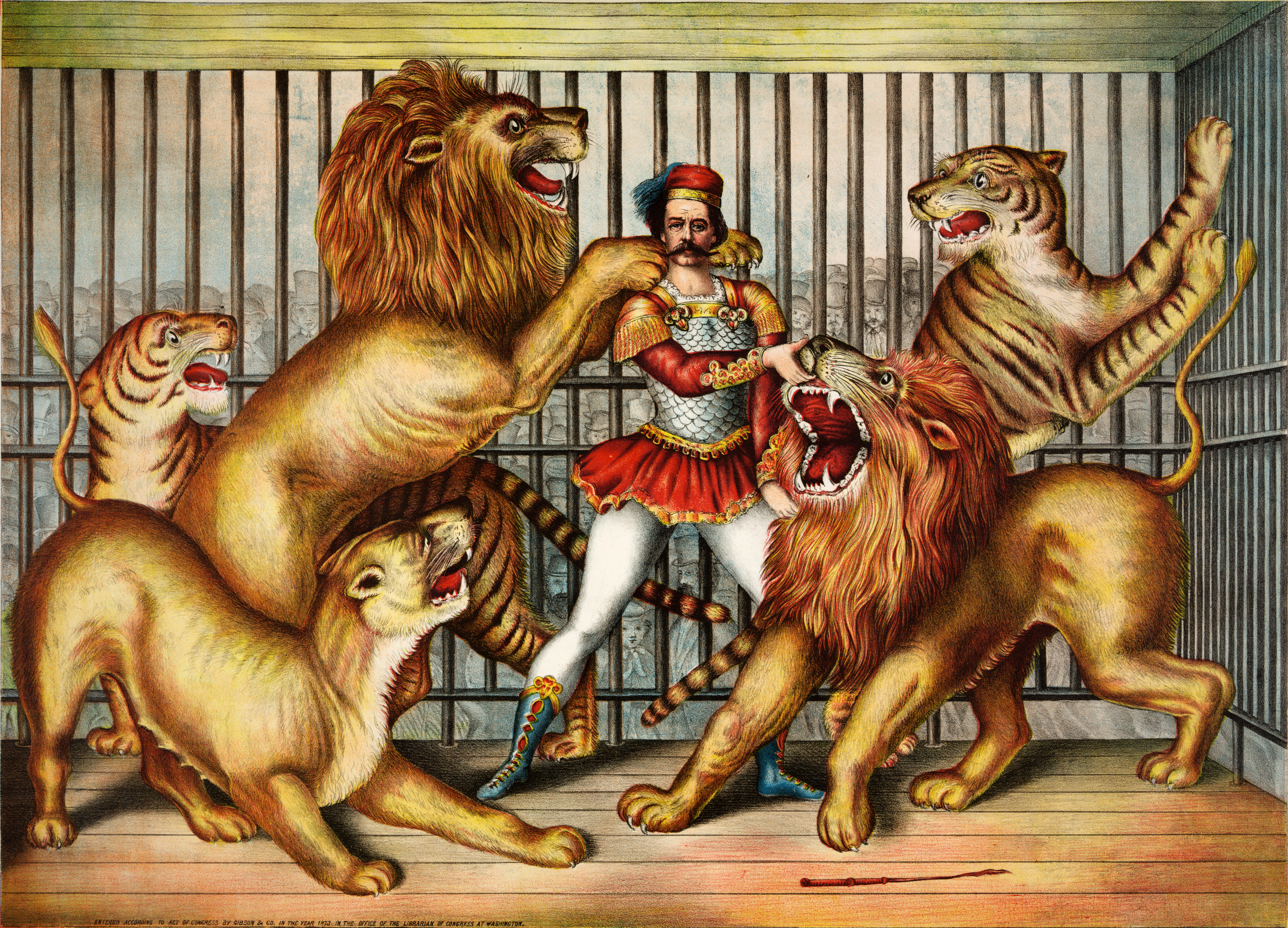
Lion tamer, in lithograph by Gibson & Co., 1873

After an 1881 merger with James Anthony Bailey and James L. Hutchinson's circus and Barnum's death in 1891, his circus travelled to Europe as the Barnum & Bailey Greatest Show On Earth, where it toured from 1897 to 1902, impressing other circus owners with its large scale, its touring techniques (including the tent and circus train), and its combination of circus acts, a zoological exhibition, and a freak show.This format was adopted by European circuses at the turn of the 20th century.

The influence of the American circus brought about a considerable change in the character of the modern circus. In arenas too large for speech to be easily audible, the traditional comic dialogue of the clown assumed a less prominent place than formerly, while the vastly increased wealth of stage properties relegated to the background the old-fashioned equestrian feats, which were replaced by more ambitious acrobatic performances, and by exhibitions of skill, strength, and daring, requiring the employment of immense numbers of performers, and often of complicated and expensive machinery.

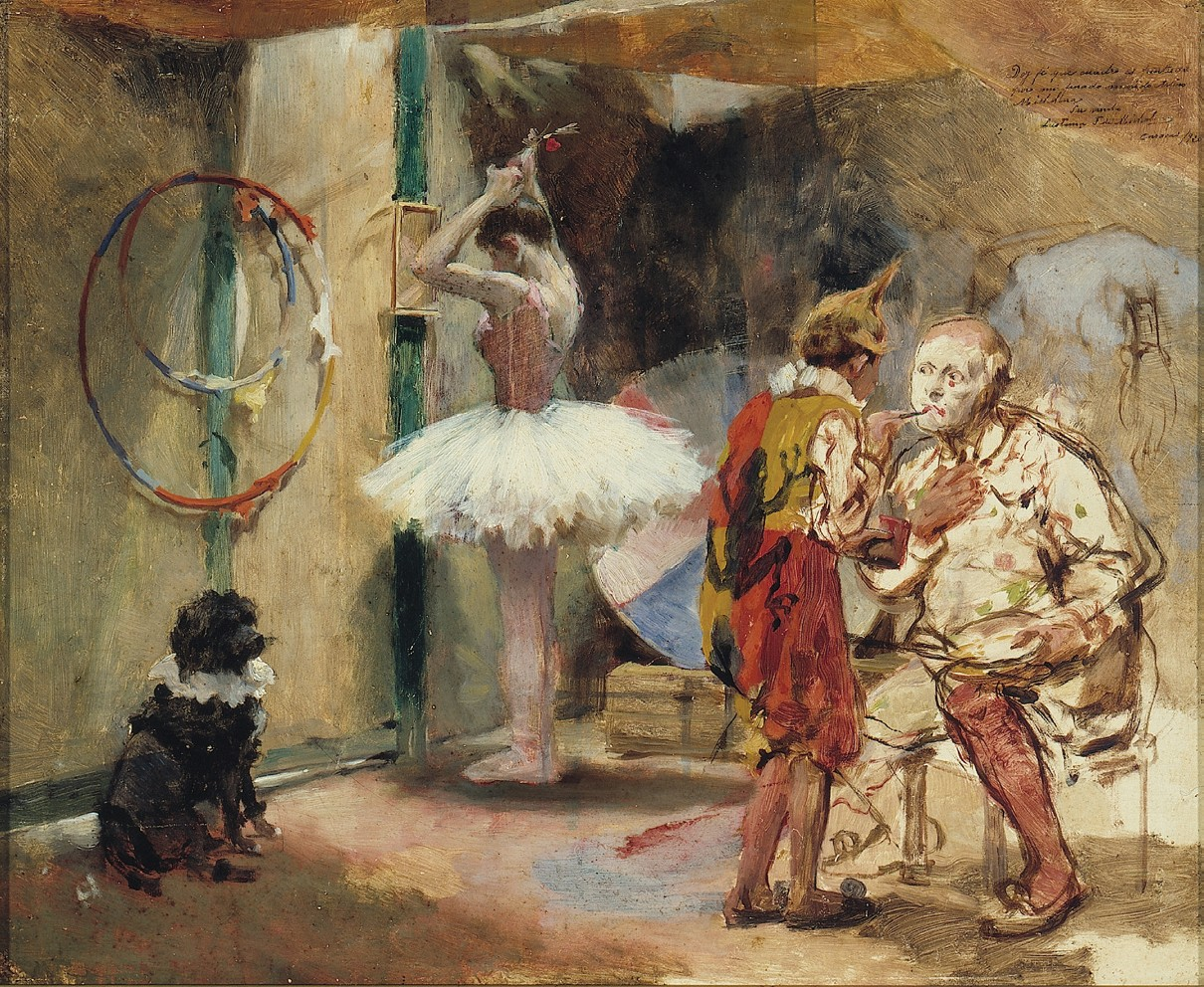
Painting by Venezuelan Arturo Michelena, c. 1891, depicting a backstage area at the circus

From the late 19th century through the first half of the 20th century, travelling circuses were a major form of spectator entertainment in the US and attracted huge attention whenever they arrived in a city. After World War II, the popularity of the circus declined as new forms of entertainment (such as television) arrived and the public's tastes changed. From the 1960s onward, circuses attracted growing criticism from animal rights activists. Many circuses went out of business or were forced to merge with other circus companies. Nonetheless, a good number of travelling circuses are still active in various parts of the world, ranging from small family enterprises to three-ring extravaganzas. Other companies found new ways to draw in the public with innovative new approaches to the circus form itself.

==== Russia ====
In 1919, Lenin, head of Soviet Russia, expressed a wish for the circus to become "the people's art-form", with facilities and status on par with theatre, opera and ballet. The USSR nationalised Russian circuses. In 1927, the State University of Circus and Variety Arts, better known as the Moscow Circus School, was established; performers were trained using methods developed from the Soviet gymnastics programme. When the Moscow State Circus company began international tours in the 1950s, its levels of originality and artistic skill were widely applauded.

Freak show circus

==== China ====
Circuses from China, drawing on Chinese traditions of acrobatics, like the Chinese State Circus are also popular touring acts.

=== New circus ===
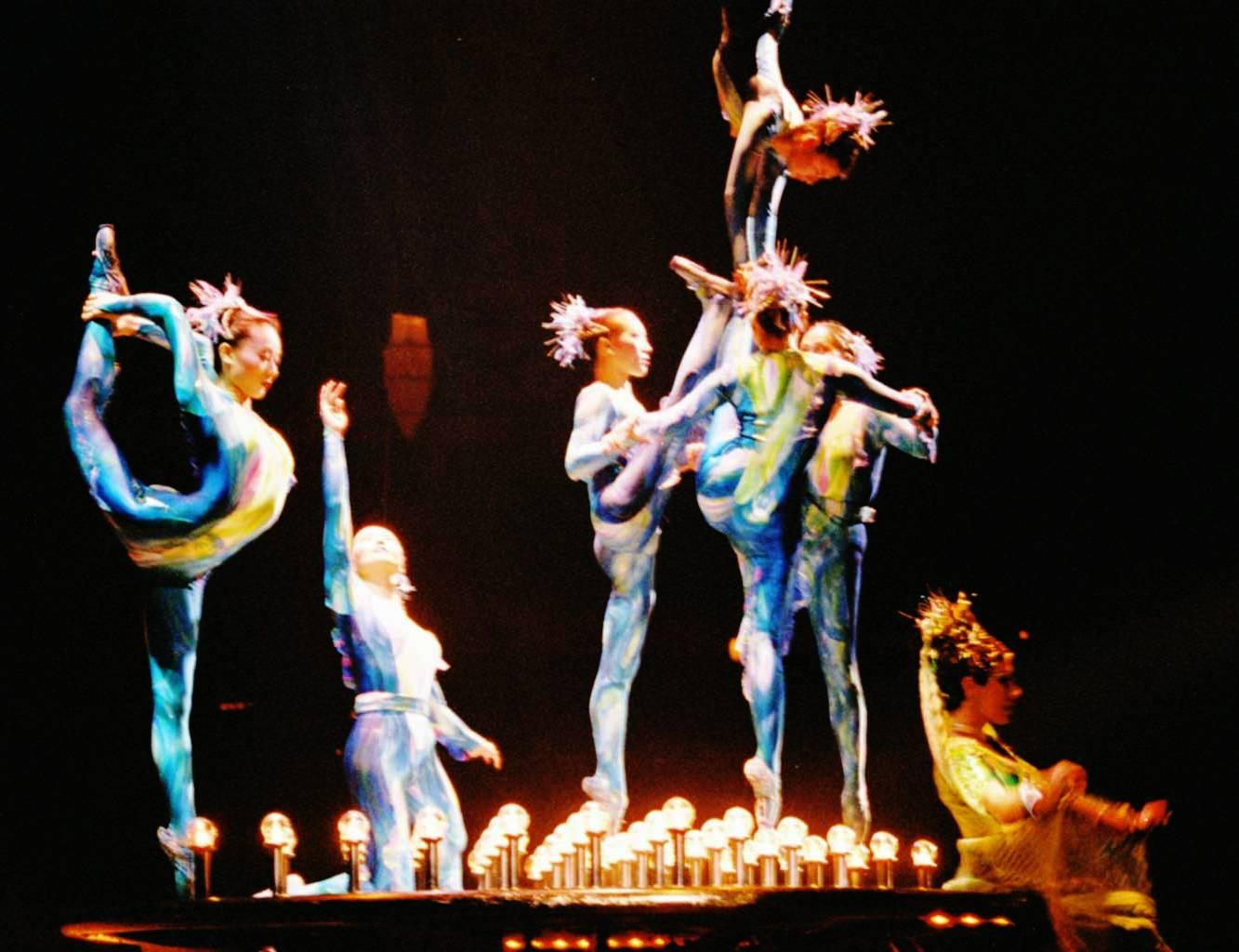
Cirque du Soleil performing Dralion in Vienna, 2004

New circus (originally known as cirque nouveau) is a performing arts movement that originated in the 1970s in Australia, Canada, France, the West Coast of the United States, and the United Kingdom. New circus combines traditional circus skills and theatrical techniques to convey a story or theme. Compared with the traditional circus, this genre of circus tends to focus more attention on the overall aesthetic impact, on character and story development, and on the use of lighting design, original music, and costume design to convey thematic or narrative content. Music used in the production is often composed exclusively for that production, and aesthetic influences are drawn as much from contemporary culture as from circus history. Animal acts rarely appear in new circus, in contrast to traditional circus, where animal acts have often been a significant part of the entertainment.

Early pioneers of the new circus genre included: Circus Oz, forged in Australia in 1977 from SoapBox Circus (1976) and New Circus (1973); the Pickle Family Circus, founded in San Francisco in 1975; Ra-Ra Zoo in 1984 in London; Nofit State Circus in 1984 from Wales; Cirque du Soleil, founded in Quebec in 1984; Cirque Plume and Archaos from France in 1984 and 1986 respectively. More recent examples include: Cirque Éloize (founded in Quebec in 1993); Sweden's Cirkus Cirkör (1995); Teatro ZinZanni (founded in Seattle in 1998); the West African Circus Baobab (late 1990s); and Montreal's Les 7 doigts de la main (founded in 2002). The genre includes other circus troupes such as the Vermont-based Circus Smirkus (founded in 1987 by Rob Mermin) and Le Cirque Imaginaire (later renamed Le Cirque Invisible, both founded and directed by Victoria Chaplin, daughter of Charlie Chaplin).

Cirque du Soleil has been one of the most commercially successful companies associated with the new circus genre. In 2009, its estimated annual revenue exceeded US$810 million in 2009, and its productions had been seen by nearly 90 million spectators in more than 200 cities across five continents.

=== Contemporary circus ===
The genre of contemporary circus is largely considered to have begun in 1995 with 'Le Cri du Caméléon', an ensemble performance from the graduating class of the French circus school Le Centre National des Arts du Cirque (CNAC), directed by Joseph Nadj. In contrast to new circus, contemporary circus (as a genre) tends to avoid linear narrative in favour of more suggestive, interdisciplinary approaches to abstract concepts. This includes a strong trend for developing new apparatus and movement languages based on the capacities, experience and interests of individual performers, rather than finding new ways to present traditional repertoire.

=== Social circus ===
Social circus refers to the growing movement toward the use of circus arts as mediums for social justice and social good. It uses alternative pedagogical tools to work with youth who are marginalized or at social or personal risk.

== Performance ==
A traditional circus performance is often led by a ringmaster who has a role similar to a master of ceremonies. The ringmaster presents performers, speaks to the audience, and generally keeps the show moving. The activity of the circus traditionally takes place within a ring; large circuses may have multiple rings, like the six-ringed Moscow State Circus. A circus often travels with its own band, whose instrumentation in the United States has traditionally included brass instruments, drums, glockenspiel, and sometimes the distinctive sound of the calliope. Performers have been traditionally referred to as artistes, although in recent years the term artists has also come into regular use. Some performers from multi-generational circus families still prefer the term artiste and consider it to confer higher status than artist. Conversely, some performers from the circus school training route—taken by many of the newer generations—prefer the term artist as less pretentious than artiste. The physical and creative skills that circus artist/es perform are known as disciplines, and are often grouped for training purposes into the broad categories of juggling, equilibristics, acrobatics, aerial and clowning. These disciplines can be honed into individual acts, which can be performed independently and marketed to many different prospective circus employers, and also used for devising solo or collaborative work created specifically for a single project.

=== Acts ===
Common acts include a variety of acrobatics, gymnastics (including tumbling and trampoline), aerial acts (such as trapeze, aerial silk, corde lisse, Aerial Hoop and aerial straps) contortion, stilt-walking, and a variety of other routines. Juggling is one of the most common acts in a circus; the combination of juggling and gymnastics that includes acts like plate spinning and the rolling globe come under the category equilibristics, along with more classical balance disciplines such as tightwire, slackline and unicycle. Acts like these are some of the most common and the most traditional. Clowns are also a big part of the circus community.

Clowns are common to most circuses and are typically skilled in many circus acts; "clowns getting into the act" is a very familiar theme in any circus. Famous circus clowns have included Austin Miles, the Fratellini Family, Rusty Russell, Emmett Kelly, Grock, Bill Irwin, Tweedy, and Erwyd. The title of clown refers to the role functions and performance skills, not simply to the image of red nose and exaggerated face paint that was popularised through 20th Century mass media. While many clowns still perform in this styling, there are also many clowns who adopt a more natural look.

Daredevil stunt acts, freak shows, and sideshow acts are also parts of some circus acts. These activities may include human cannonball, chapeaugraphy, fire eating, breathing, and dancing, knife throwing, magic shows, sword swallowing, or strongman. Famous sideshow performers include Zip the Pinhead, The Doll Family, and Australian stunt performer Chayne Hultgren (The Space Cowboy), noted for extreme acts such as blindfolded arrow catching and Tesla coil performances. A popular sideshow attraction from the early 19th century was the flea circus, where fleas were attached to props and viewed through a Fresnel lens.

=== Animal acts ===
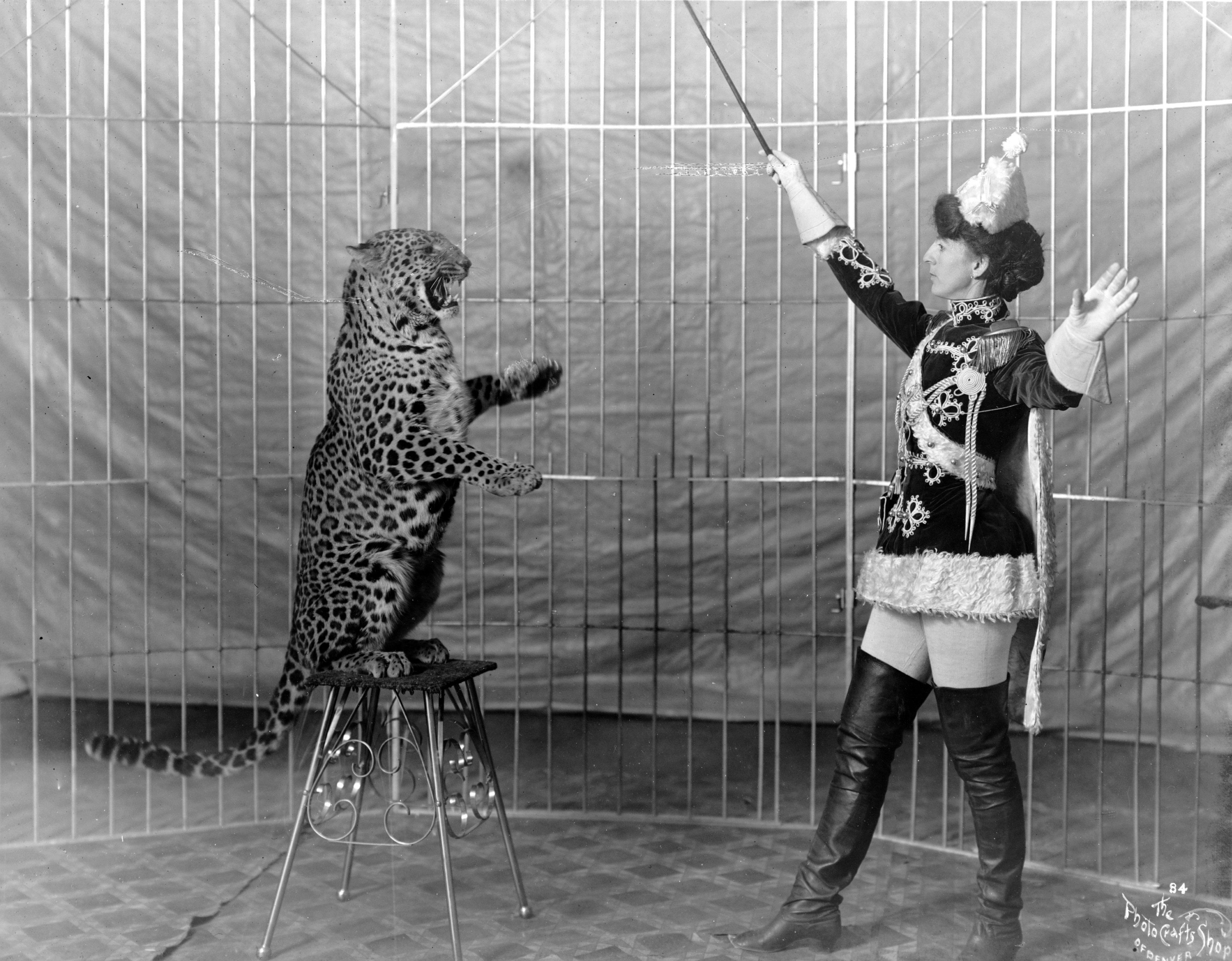
Lion tamer and leopard

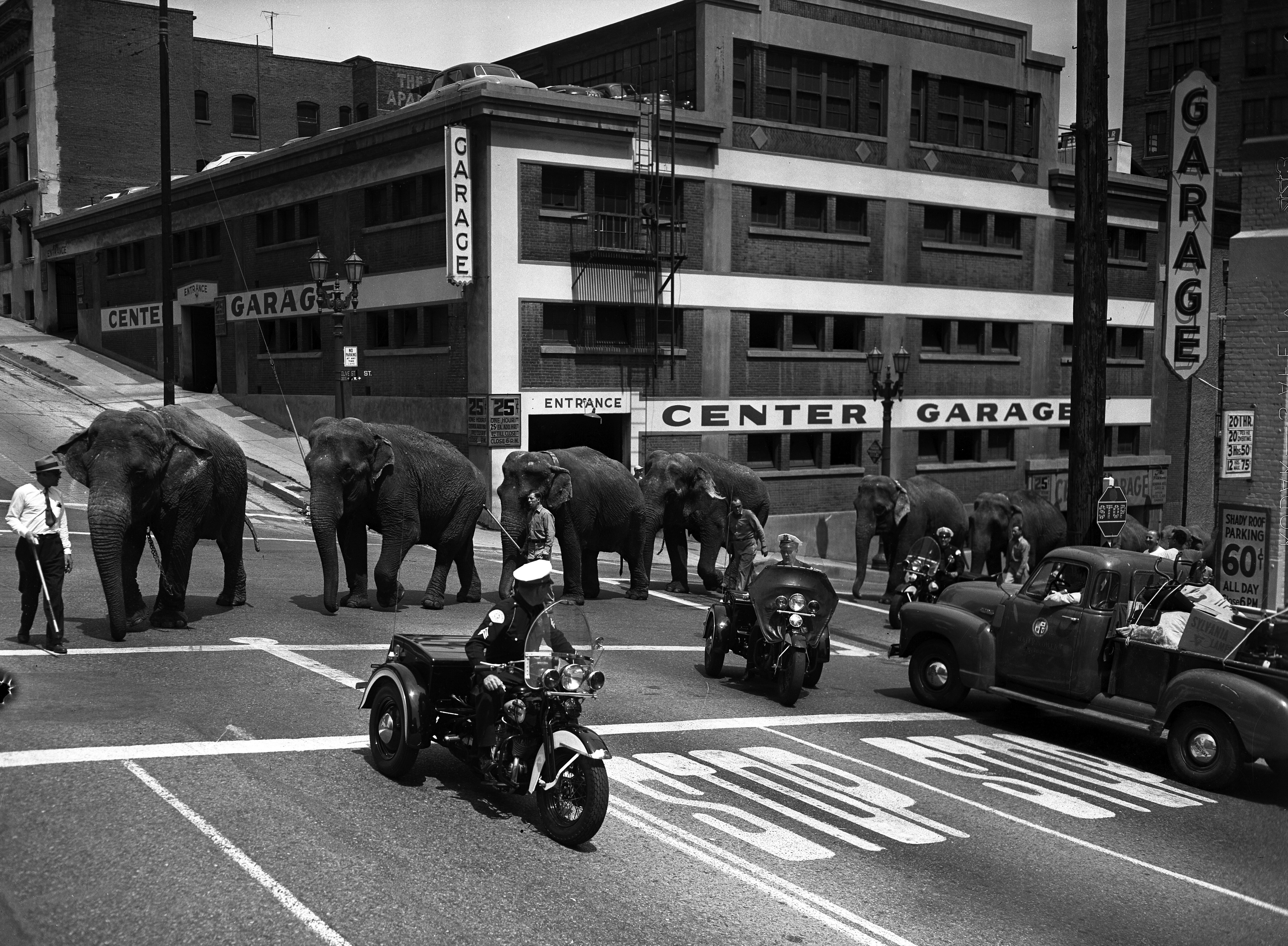
Elephants from Cole Brothers Circus parade through downtown Los Angeles, 1953

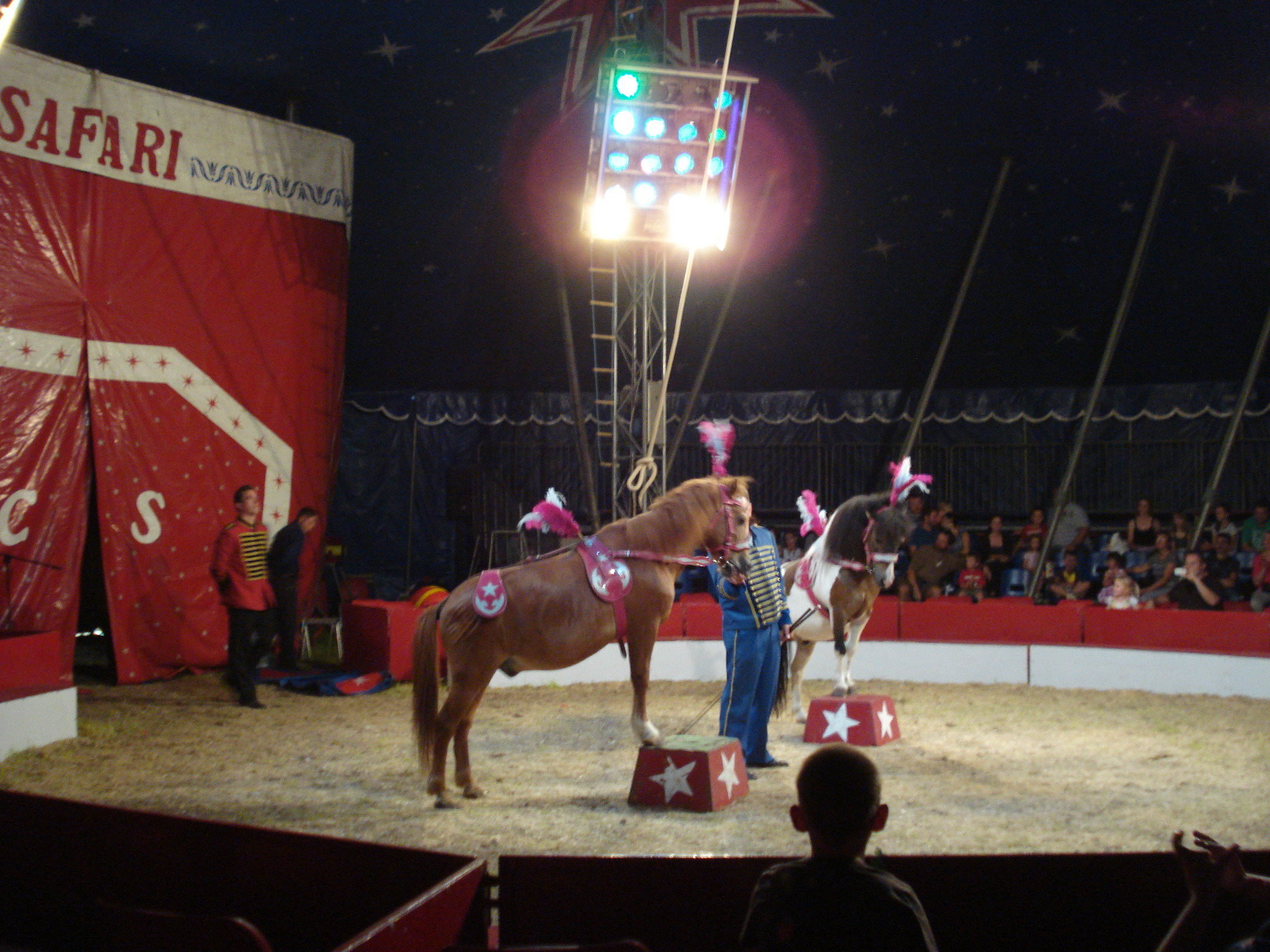
Circus horse act

The earliest involvement of animals in circus was just the display of exotic creatures in a menagerie. Going as far back as the early eighteenth century, exotic animals were transported to North America for display, and menageries were a popular form of entertainment. The first true animals acts in the circus were equestrian acts. Soon elephants and big cats were displayed as well. Isaac A. Van Amburgh entered a cage with several big cats in 1833, and is generally considered to be the first wild animal trainer in American circus history. Mabel Stark was a famous tiger-tamer.

==== Controversy and laws ====
Worldwide laws on animal use in circuses: Nationwide ban / Partial or local bans (Note: Certain animals are excluded or the laws vary internally.); Ban on import/export / No ban; Unknown

Many countries (Note: Austria, Belgium, Bolivia, Bosnia and Herzegovina, Bulgaria, Colombia, Costa Rica, Croatia, Cyprus, Czech Republic, Denmark, Ecuador, El Salvador, Estonia, Finland, Greece, Hungary, India, Iran, Ireland, Israel, Italy, Malta, Mexico, the Netherlands, Norway, Panama, Paraguay, Peru, Poland, Portugal, Singapore, Slovenia, Sweden, Switzerland, and Turkey) have implemented nationwide bans on using some if not all animals in circuses. Other countries (Note: Argentina, Australia, Brazil, Canada, Chile, Germany, Spain, the United Kingdom, and the United States) have locally restricted or banned the use of animals in entertainment. In response to a growing popular concern about the use of animals in entertainment, animal-free circuses are becoming more common around the world.

Despite the contemporary circus's shift toward more theatrical techniques and its emphasis on human rather than animal performance, traditional circus companies still exist alongside the new movement. Many continue to maintain animal performers, such as the Big Apple Circus from the United States, Circus Krone from Munich, Circus Royale and Lennon Bros Circus from Australia, Vazquez Hermanos Circus, Circo Atayde Hermanos, and Hermanos Mayaror Circus from Mexico, and Moira Orfei Circus from Italy.

== Buildings ==
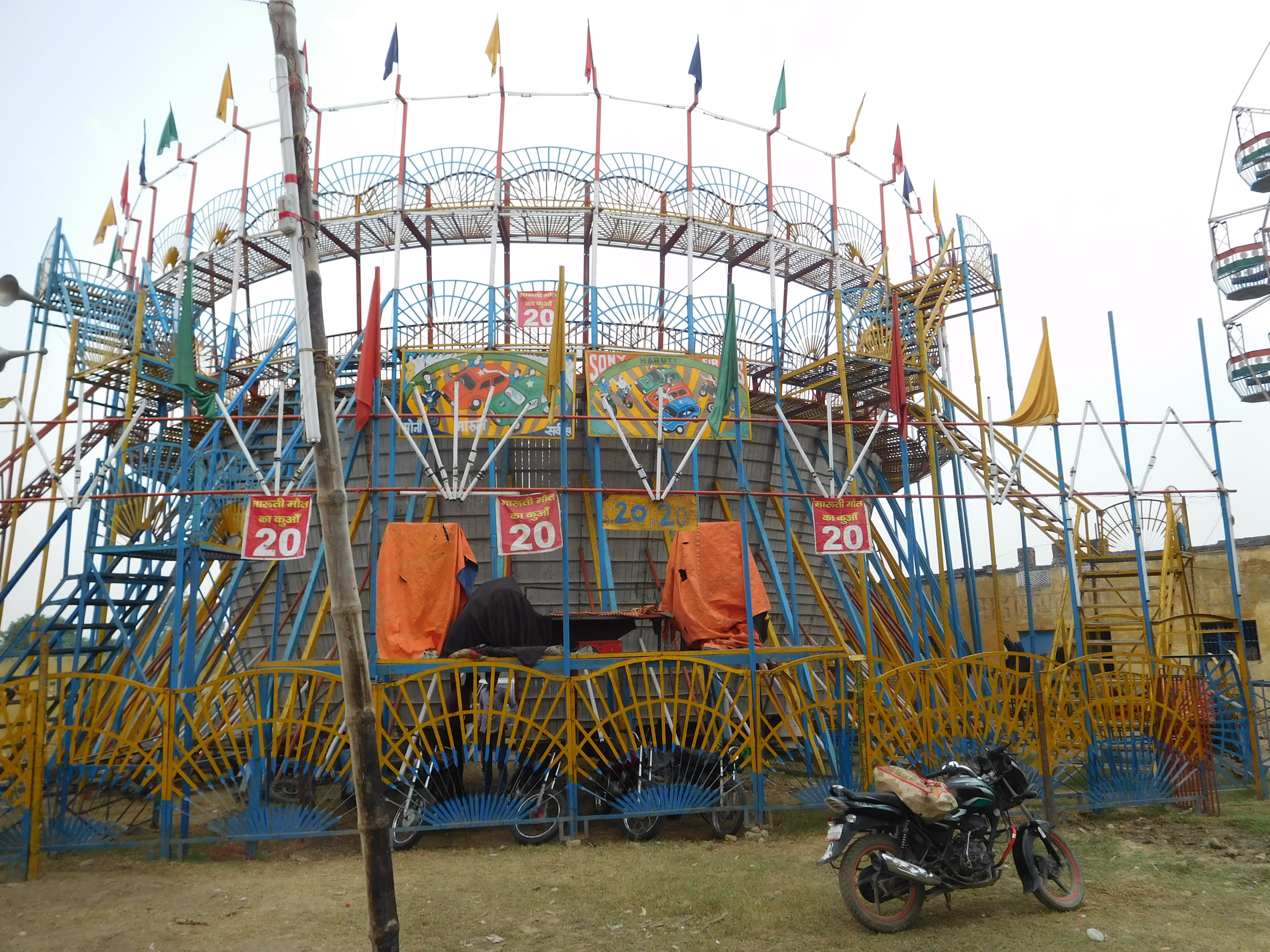
Circus building

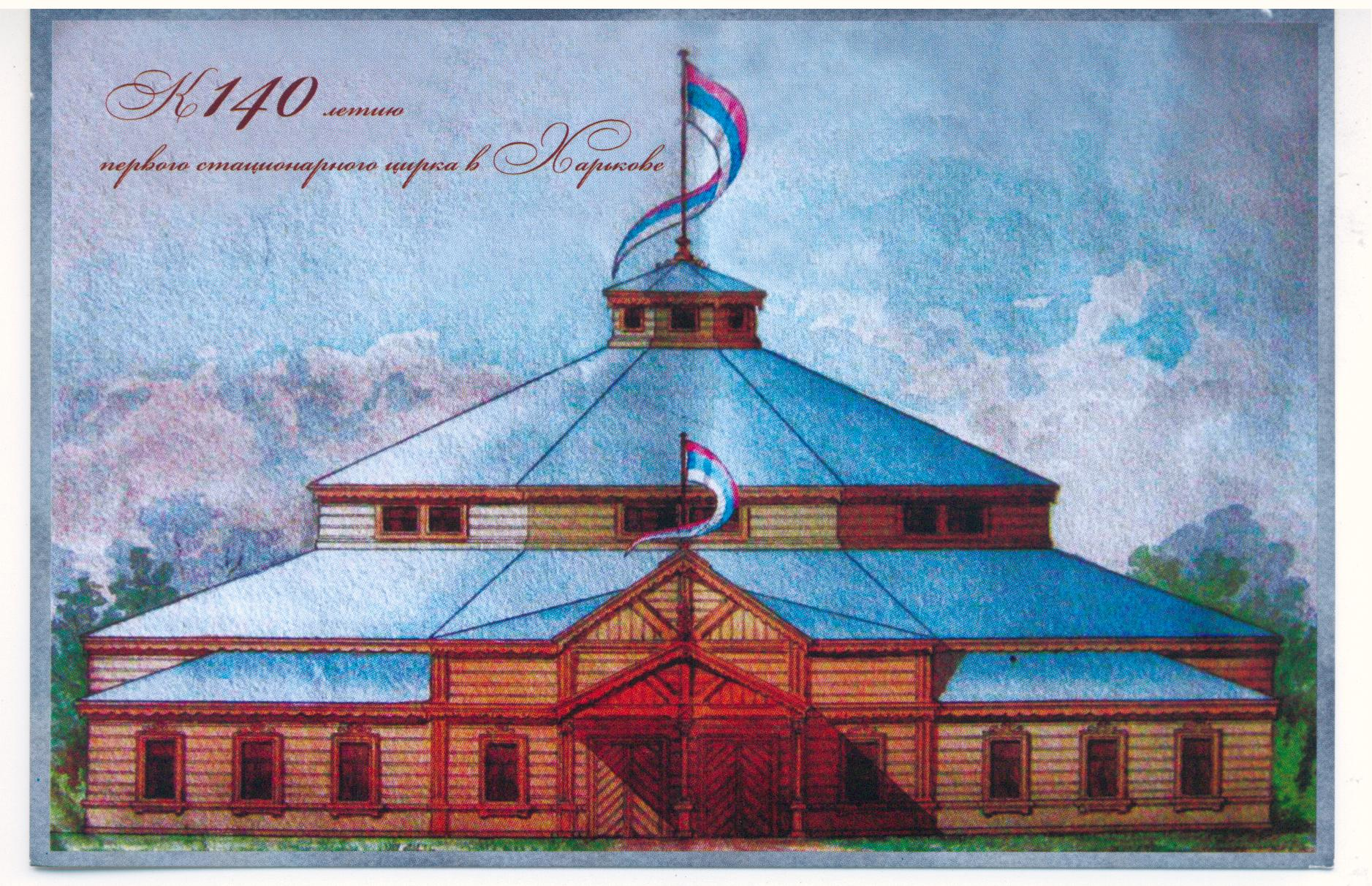
Paper postcard of the Old Kharkiv Wood Circus

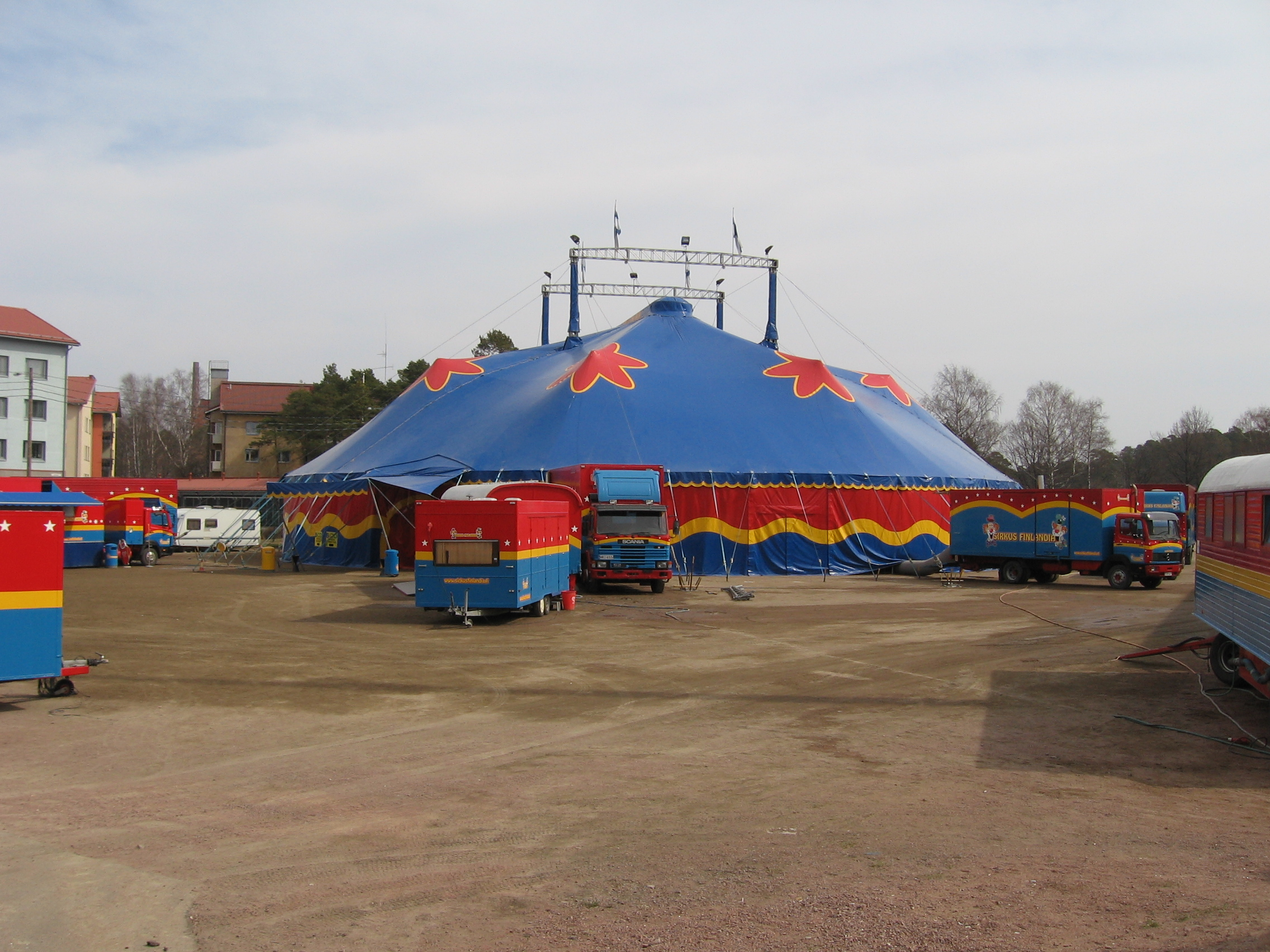
A tent of Sirkus Finlandia

In some towns, there are circus buildings where regular performances are held. The best known are:

- Blackpool Tower Circus
- Budapest Circus
- Circus Krone Building in Munich
- Cirque d'hiver, Paris
- Cirque Jules Verne in Amiens
- Hippodrome Circus, Great Yarmouth
- La Tohu in Montreal
- Moscow Circus on Tsvetnoy Boulevard in Moscow
- Ciniselli Circus in Saint Petersburg
- Shanghai Circus World in Shanghai
- Turkmen State Circus in Ashgabat
- Riga Circus in Riga
- Belarus State Circus in Minsk
- "Globus" Circus in Bucharest
- The “Dingaling House” in Loch Ness

In other countries, purpose-built circus buildings still exist which are no longer used as circuses, or are used for circus only occasionally among a wider programme of events; for example, the Cirkusbygningen (The Circus Building) in Copenhagen, Denmark, Cirkus in Stockholm, Sweden, or Carré Theatre in Amsterdam, Netherlands.

== International awards ==
The International Circus Festival of Monte-Carlo has been held in Monaco since 1974 and was the first of many international awards for circus performers.

== See also ==
- Animal training
- Circus clown
- Clown alley
- Circus skills
- Cirque du Soleil
- Clown
- Contemporary circus
- Dog and pony show
- Flea circus
- History of Indian circus
- International Circus Festival of Monte-Carlo
- Traveling carnival
- Lion taming
- List of circuses and circus owners
- Maroma

== Notes ==
=== References ===
- Speaight, George (1980). A History of the Circus. London: Tantivy Press. ISBN 0-4980-2470-9.
