= Turkmen State Circus =

Coordinates: 37°57′15″N 58°21′58″E

- Türkmenistanyň Döwlet Sirki; Түркменистаның Дөвлет Сирки
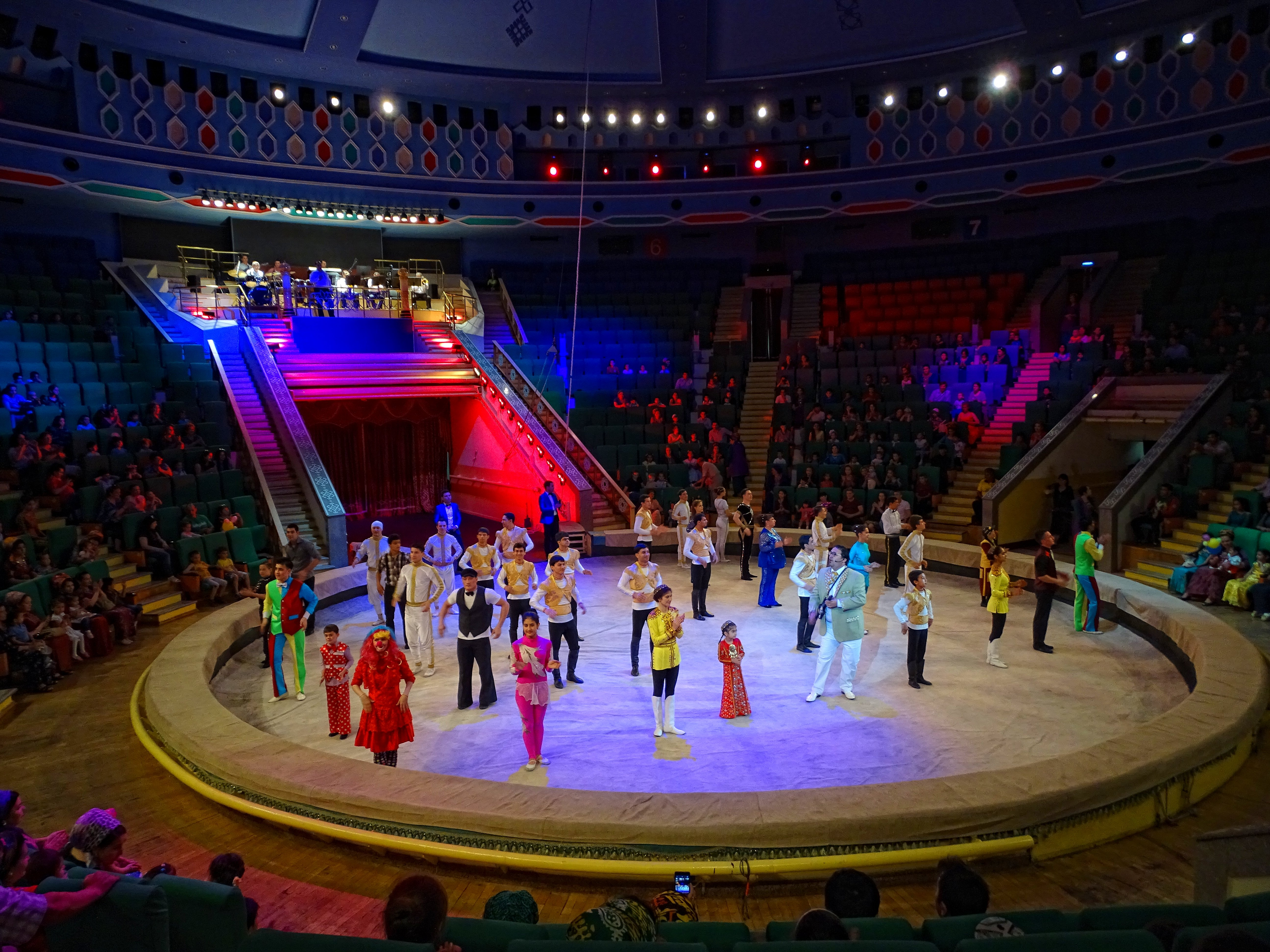
- The interior of the Turkmen State Circus at the beginning of a performance in May 2015.

General information
- Location: Ashgabat, Turkmenistan
- Construction started: 1979
- Completed: 1984

Design and construction
- Architects: Annageldy Bazarov & Arif Zeynalov

The Turkmen State Circus (Turkmen: Türkmenistanyň Döwlet Sirki/Түркменистаның Дөвлет Сирки) is the main arena circus of Ashgabat, capital of Turkmenistan. It has a seating capacity of 1,700 seats. Is administered by the Ministry of Culture and Broadcasting of Turkmenistan.

== History ==
The circus was built from 1979–1984. In 2001, President Saparmurat Niyazov abolished all circuses in the country. In 2008, the new President of Turkmenistan Gurbanguly Berdimuhamedov lifted the ban on circus. By presidential decree, the State Circus of Turkmenistan was established, operating in the Soviet era building constructed. Reconstruction of an old two-story building of the Turkmen State Circus was started in June 2008 by the Turkish company "EFOR". The cost of reconstruction was $17.9 million. In October 2009, the Turkmen State Circus was opened with the first presentation.

In 2010, an adjacent training school for circus arts was opened. In 2012, the circus performed their first foreign performance in Minsk. In 2013, the Turkmen State Circus won first place in the Circus Festival Idol in Moscow.

== Design ==
The main arena, designed for circus performances, is a circular platform with a diameter of 13 meters. The height from the arena to the highest point of the circus building is 18 meters. Seating for spectators is arranged around the arena.

== Performers and Events ==
Akhal-Teke horses, trained dogs, and other animals are used in circus performances. Each program features unique acts involving the horses, performed according to a specially designed script.

== Links ==
- Theatres and Cinema Centers
