= Sirkus Finlandia =

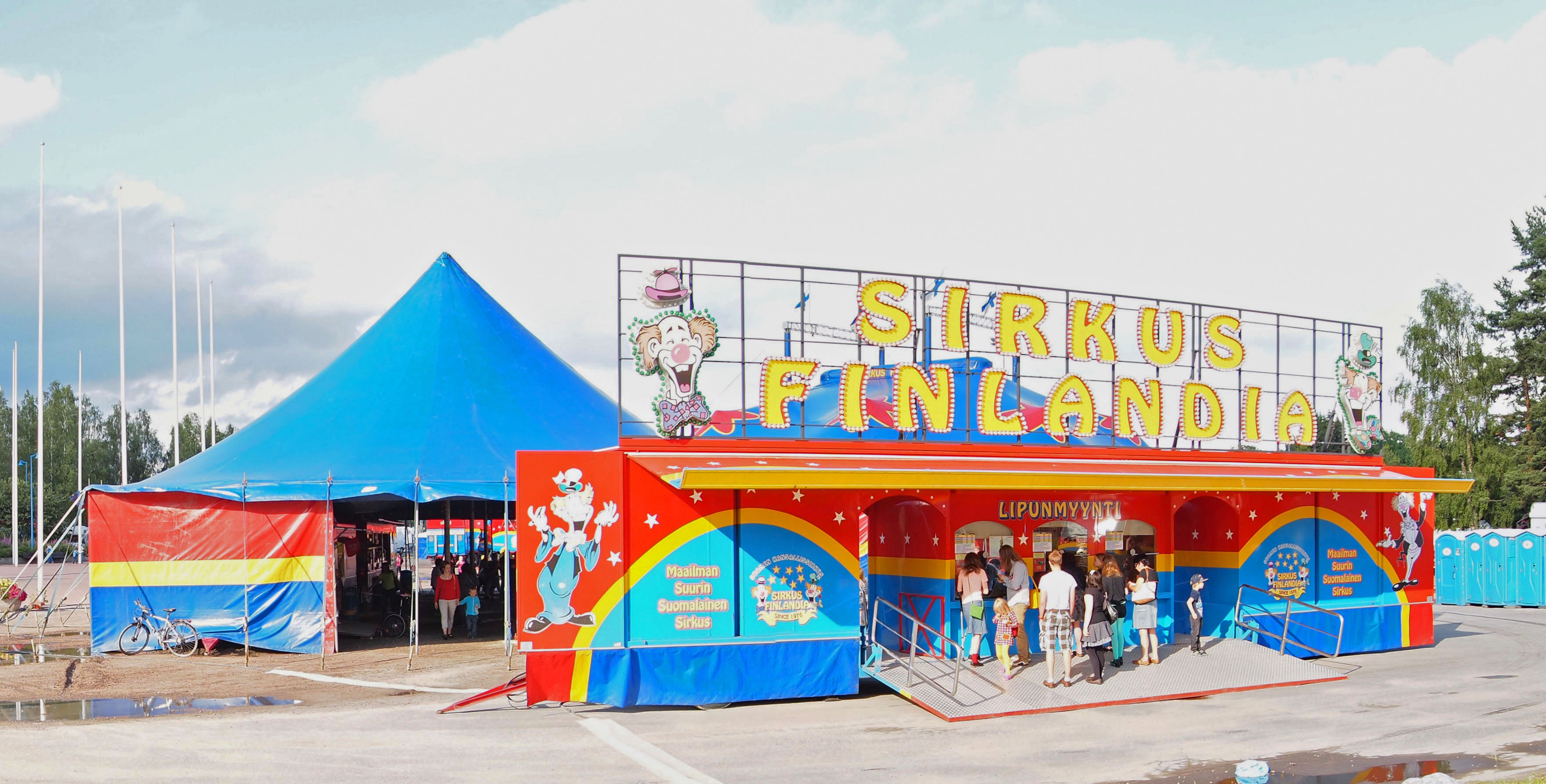
Sirkus Finlandia in Jyväskylä

Sirkus Finlandia is a Finnish circus established in 1976 by Karl-Gustaf Jernström.

The first show of Sirkus Finlandia was performed 21 April 1976 in Ekenäs, Finland. Today, Sirkus Finlandia is the only Finnish circus of international standards. It is also a member of European Circus Association. About 200,000 Finns attend Sirkus Finlandia's show each year.

Karl-Gustav Jernström and his spouse Leena Jurvakainen have four children of which three are working with the family circus: Maria, Anna, Heidi and Carl Johan. They have also four grandchildren (Maria's, Anna's and Heidi's children): Anita, Aleksia, Katerina and Charlie.

In addition to performers the circus employs about 45 people. The number of performers and band together is about 35 people.

The director of Sirkus Finlandia is now Carl Johan Jernström (Calle Jr Jernström), the son of Karl-Gustav Jernström.
