= Acrobatics =

Feats of balance and agility

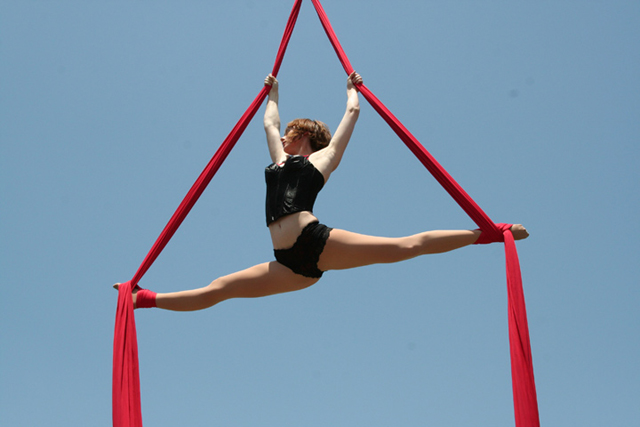
A showgirl performing aerial silk

Acrobatics (from Ancient Greek ἀκροβατέω (akrobatéō) 'walk on tiptoe, strut') is the performance of human feats of balance, agility, and motor coordination. Acrobatic skills are used in performing arts, sporting events, and martial arts. Extensive use of acrobatic skills are most often performed in acro dance, circus, gymnastics, and freerunning and to a lesser extent in other athletic activities including ballet, slacklining and diving. Although acrobatics is most commonly associated with human body performance, the term is used to describe other types of performance, such as aerobatics.

== History ==
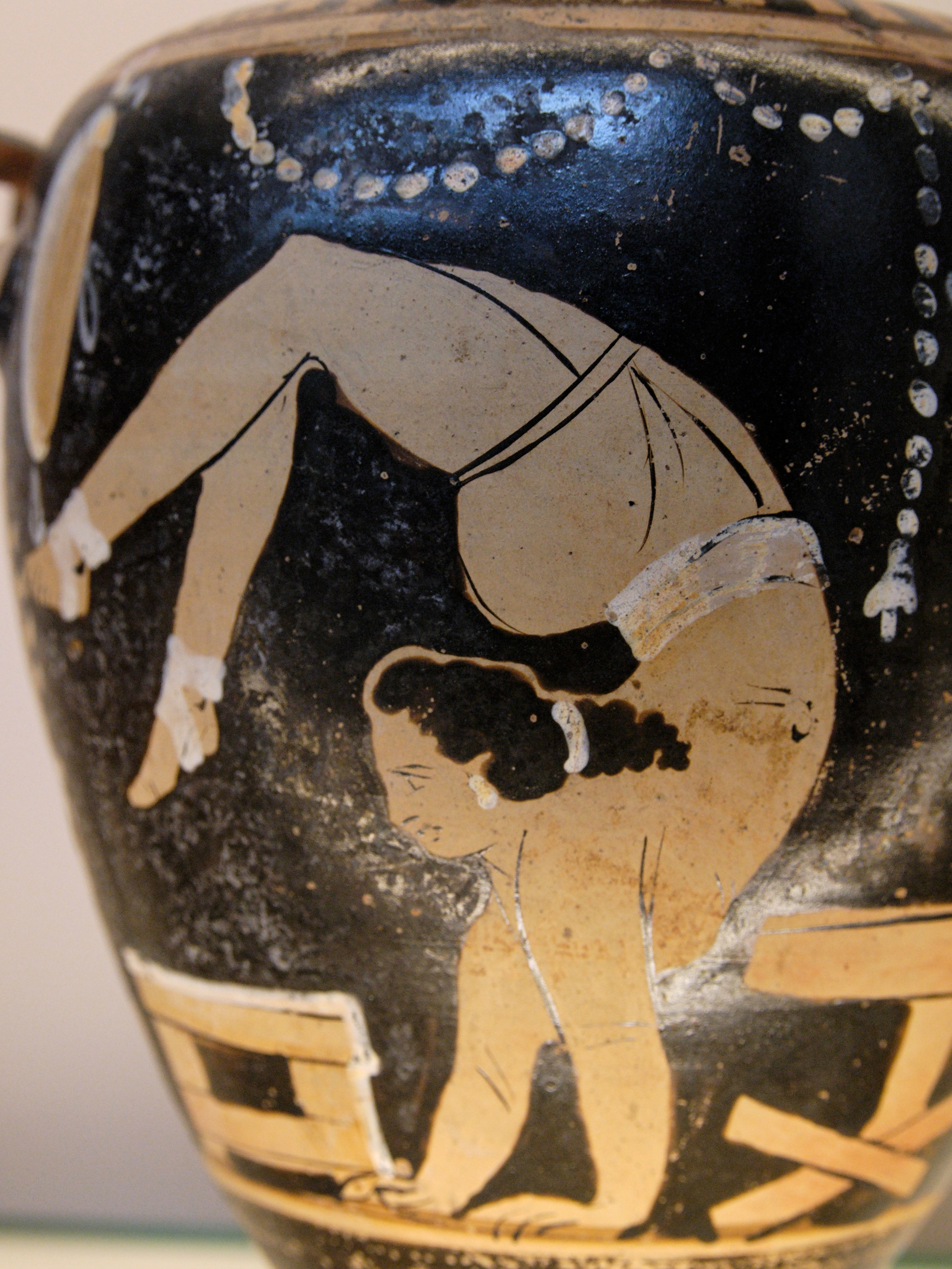
A female acrobat (Greek Campanian red-figure hydria, c. 340–330 BC)

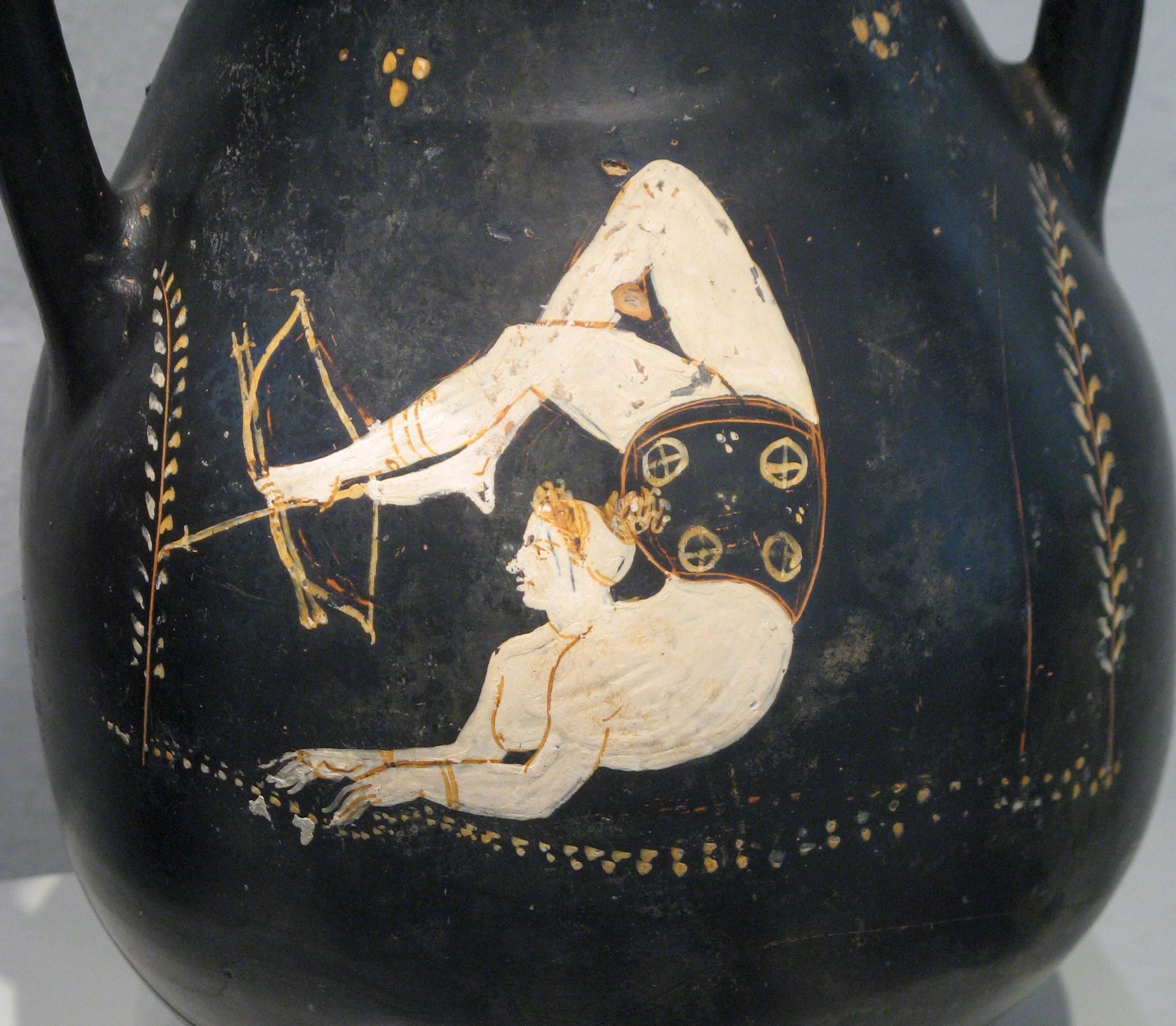
Female acrobat shooting an arrow with a bow in her feet (Greek Gnathian style pelike, 4th century BC

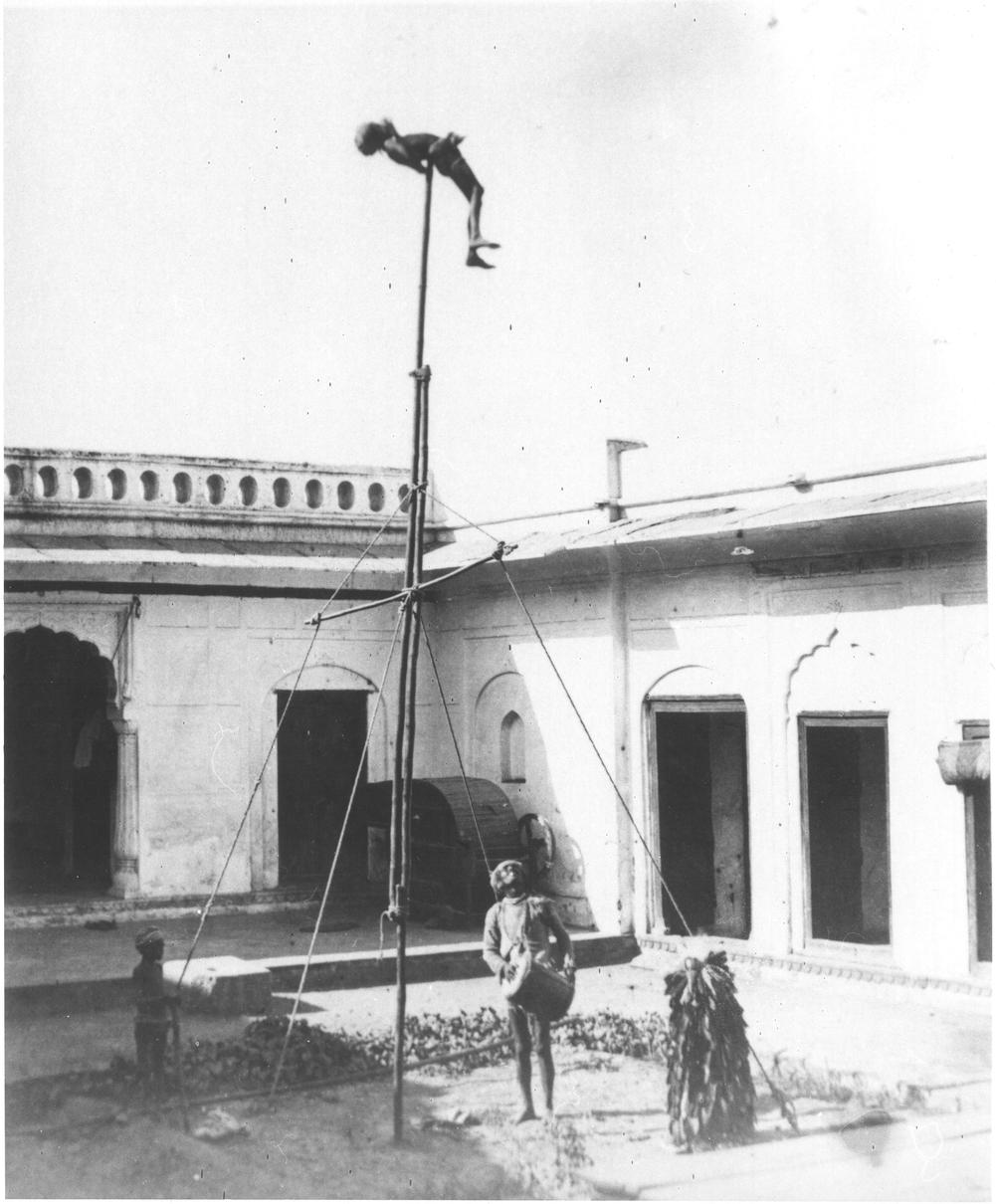
Acrobatic performance in India c. 1863

Acrobatic traditions are found in many cultures, and there is evidence that the earliest such traditions occurred thousands of years ago. For example, Minoan art from c. 2000 BC contains depictions of acrobatic feats on the backs of bulls. Ancient Greeks practiced acrobatics, and the noble court displays of the European Middle Ages would often include acrobatic performances that included juggling.

In China, acrobatics have been a part of the culture since the Tang dynasty (618–907). Acrobatics were part of village harvest festivals. During the Tang dynasty, acrobatics saw much the same sort of development as European acrobatics saw during the Middle Ages, with court displays during the 7th through 10th century dominating the practice. Acrobatics continues to be an important part of modern Chinese variety art.

Though the term initially applied to tightrope walking, in the 19th century, a form of performance art including circus acts began to use the term as well. In the late 19th century, tumbling and other acrobatic and gymnastic activities became competitive sport in Europe.

Acrobatics has often served as a subject for fine art. Examples of this are paintings such as Acrobats at the Cirque Fernando (Francisca and Angelina Wartenberg) by Impressionist Pierre-Auguste Renoir, which depicts two German acrobatic sisters, and Acrobats in a Paris suburb by Viktor Vasnetsov.

== Types ==
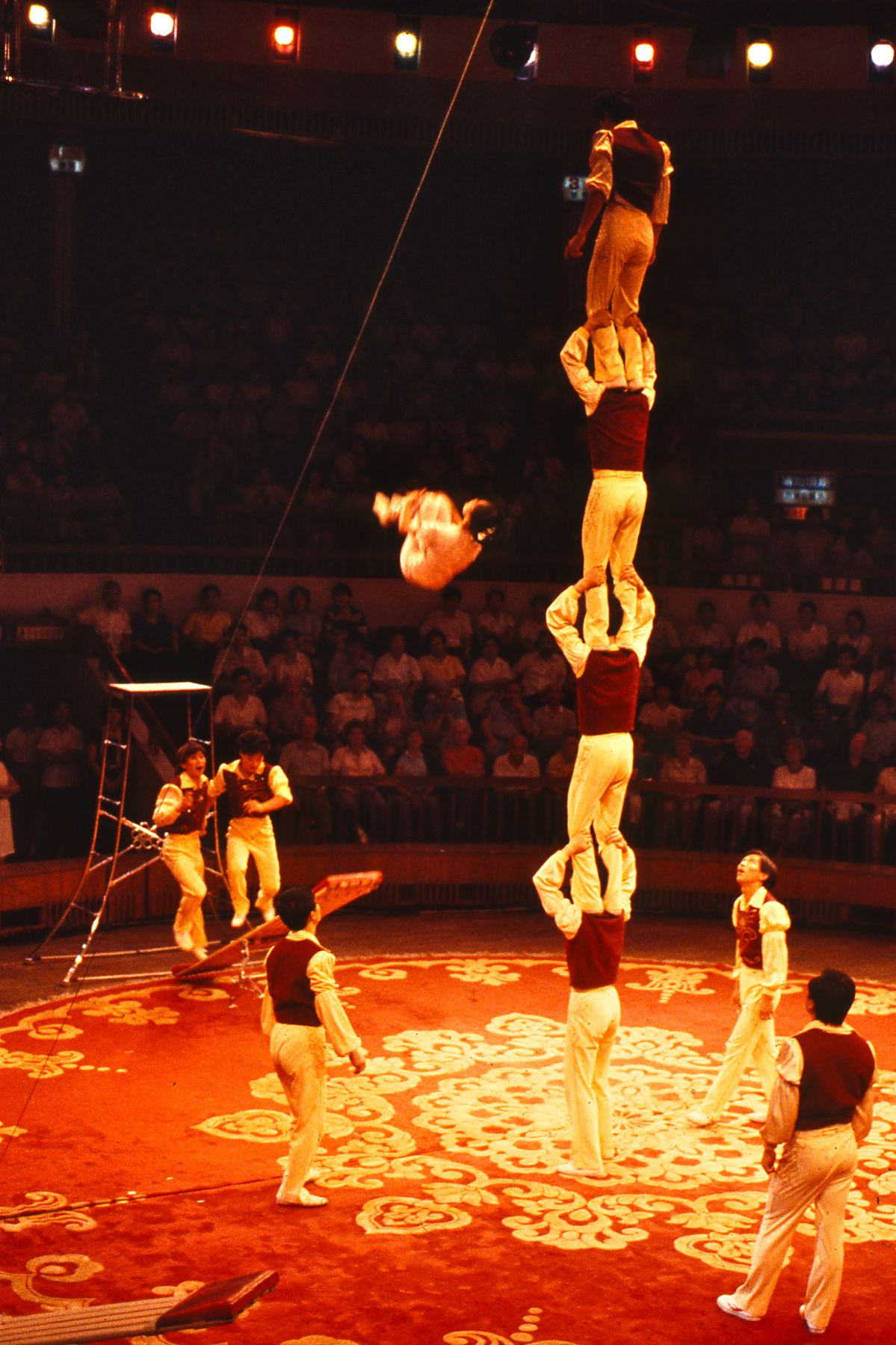
Chinese acrobat in midair after being propelled off a teeterboard, China, 1987

=== Acrobalance ===
Acrobalance is a floor based acrobatic art that involves balances, lifts and creating shapes performed in pairs or groups.

=== Acro dance ===
Acro dance is a style of dance that combines classical dance technique with precision acrobatic elements.

=== Aerial ===
Aerial is acrobatics performed in the air on a suspended apparatus.

==== Trapeze ====
A trapeze is a short horizontal bar hung by ropes or metal straps from a support. Trapeze acts may be static, spinning (rigged from a single point), swinging or flying, and may be performed solo, double, triple or as a group act.

==== Corde lisse ====
Corde lisse is a skill or act that involves acrobatics on a vertically hanging rope. The name is French for "smooth rope".

==== Cloud swing ====
Cloud swing is a skill that usually combines static and swinging trapeze skills, drops, holds and rebound lifts.

==== Cradle ====
Cradle (also known as aerial cradle or casting cradle) is a type of aerial circus skill in which a performer hangs by their knees from a large rectangular frame and swings, tosses, and catches another performer

==== Silks ====
Aerial silks is a type of aerial skill in which one or more artists perform aerial acrobatics while hanging from a long length of fabric suspended from a frame or ceiling.

==== Hoop ====
Aerial hoop (also known as the lyra, aerial ring or cerceau/cerceaux') is a circular steel apparatus (resembling a hula hoop) suspended from the ceiling or a frame, on which artists may perform aerial acrobatics. It can be used static, spinning, or swinging.

== Gallery of aerial artists ==
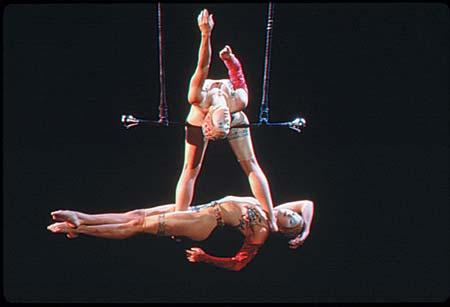
A fixed doubles trapeze act

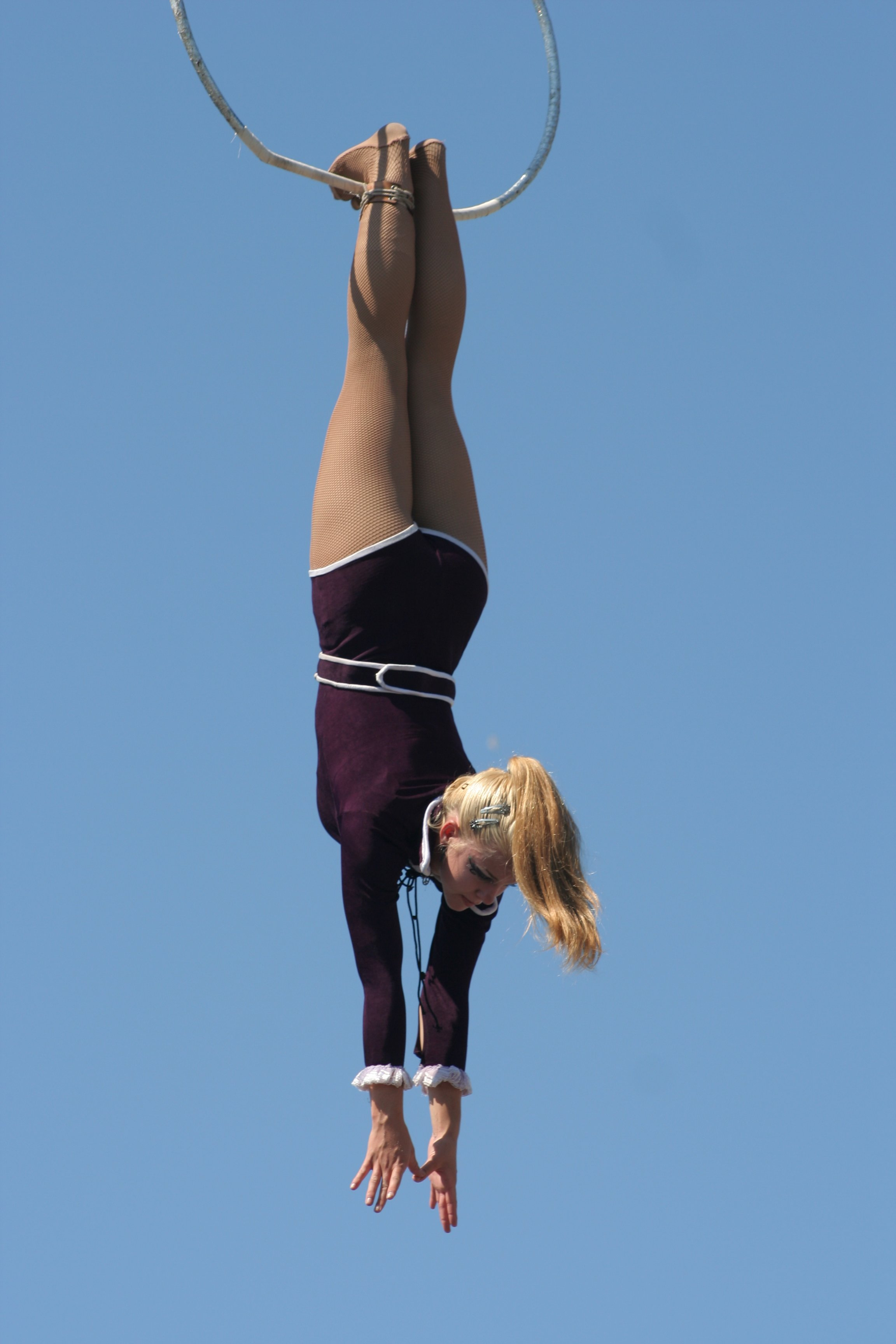
Aerial hoop act

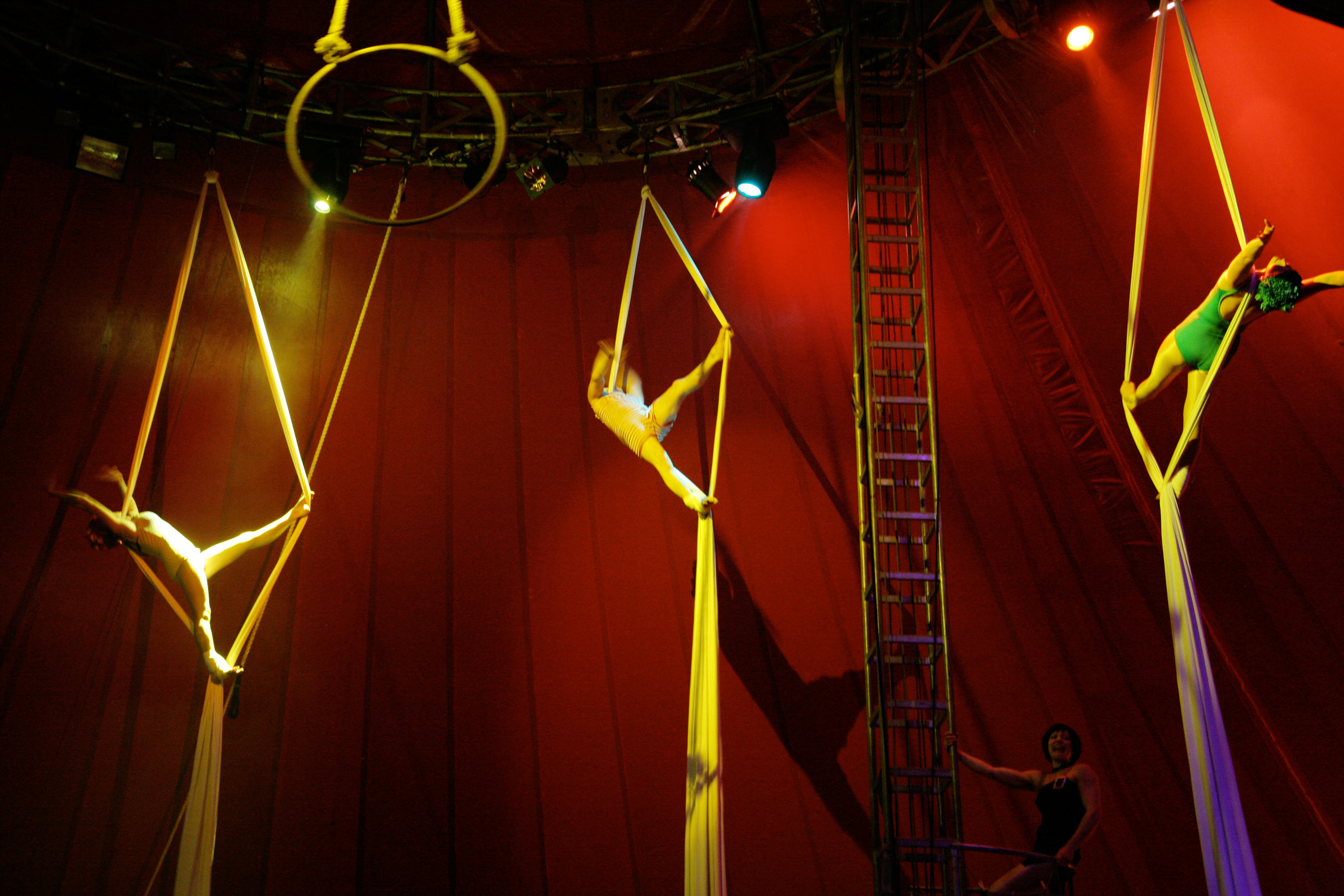
Aerial silks

=== Contortion ===
Contortion (sometimes contortionism) is a performance art in which performers called contortionists showcase their skills of extreme physical flexibility

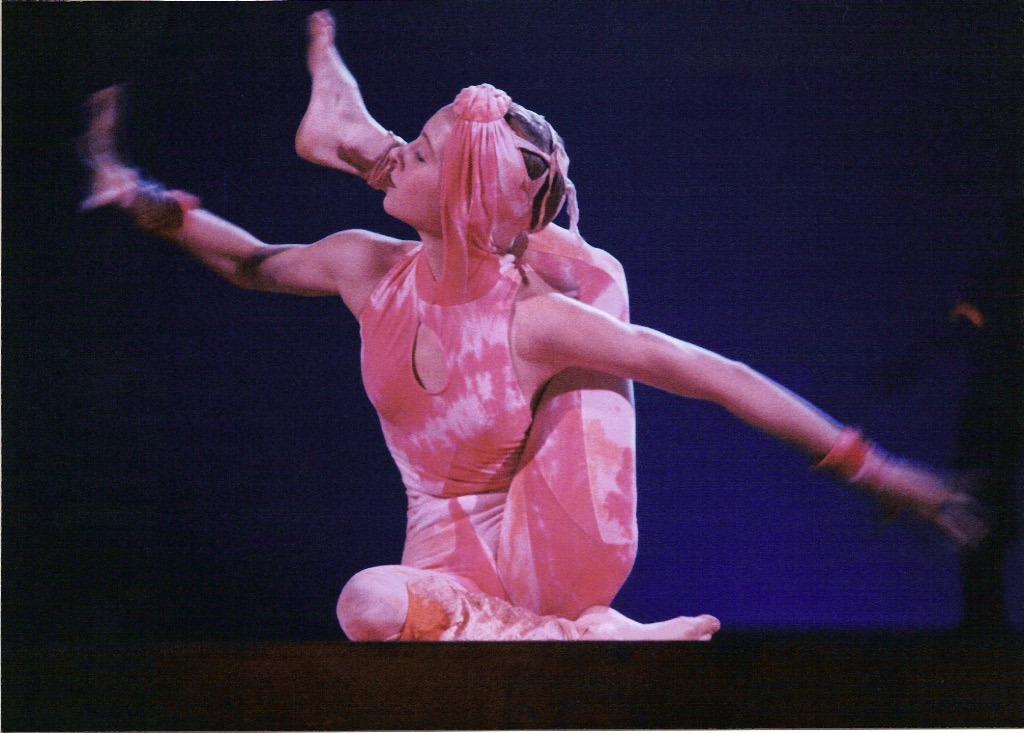
Contortionist performing with Cirque du Soleil

=== Rope and wire walking ===
Tightrope walking, also called funambulism, is the skill of walking along a thin wire or rope. Its earliest performance has been traced to Ancient Greece. It is commonly associated with the circus. Other skills similar to tightrope walking include slack rope walking and slacklining.

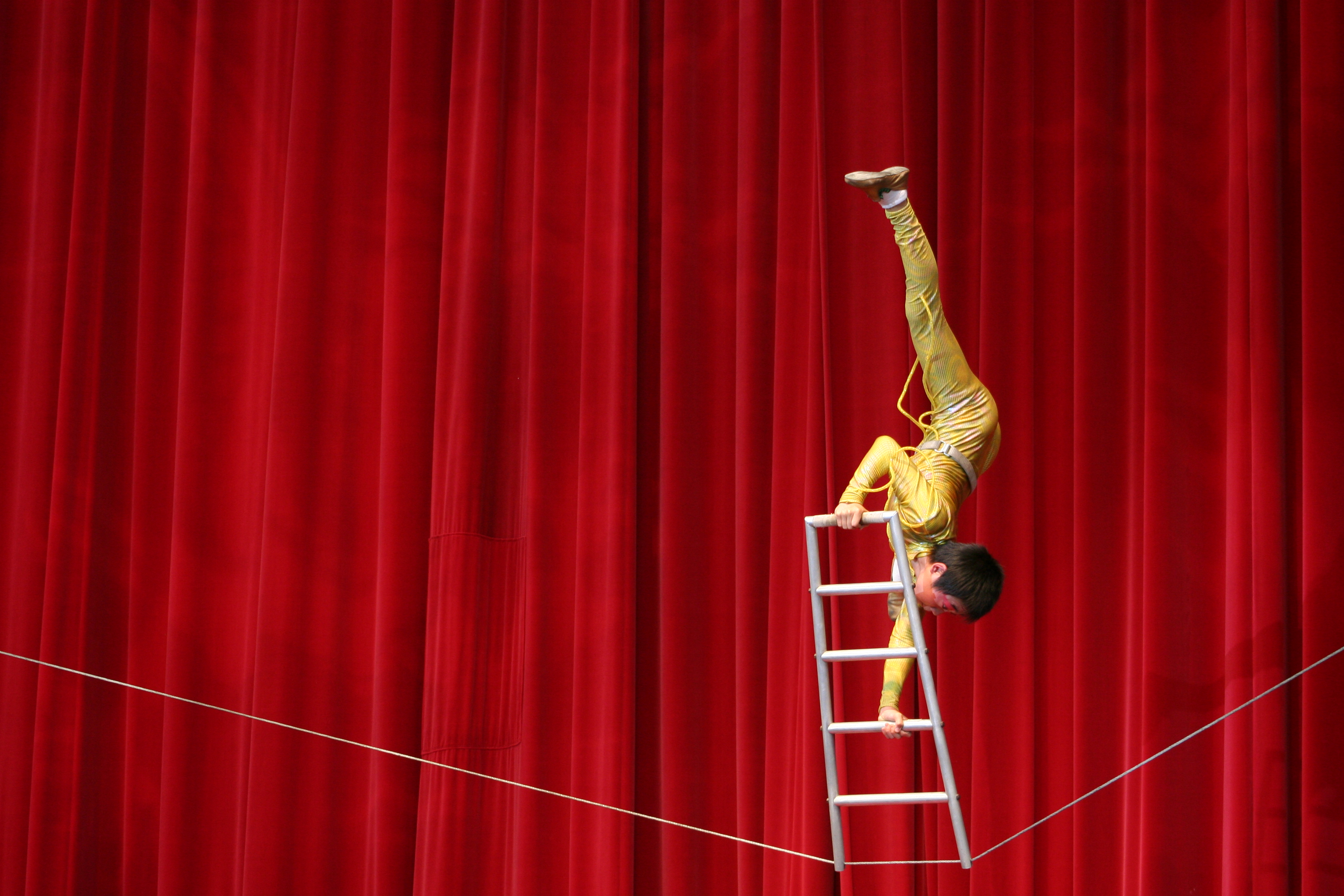
High wire act

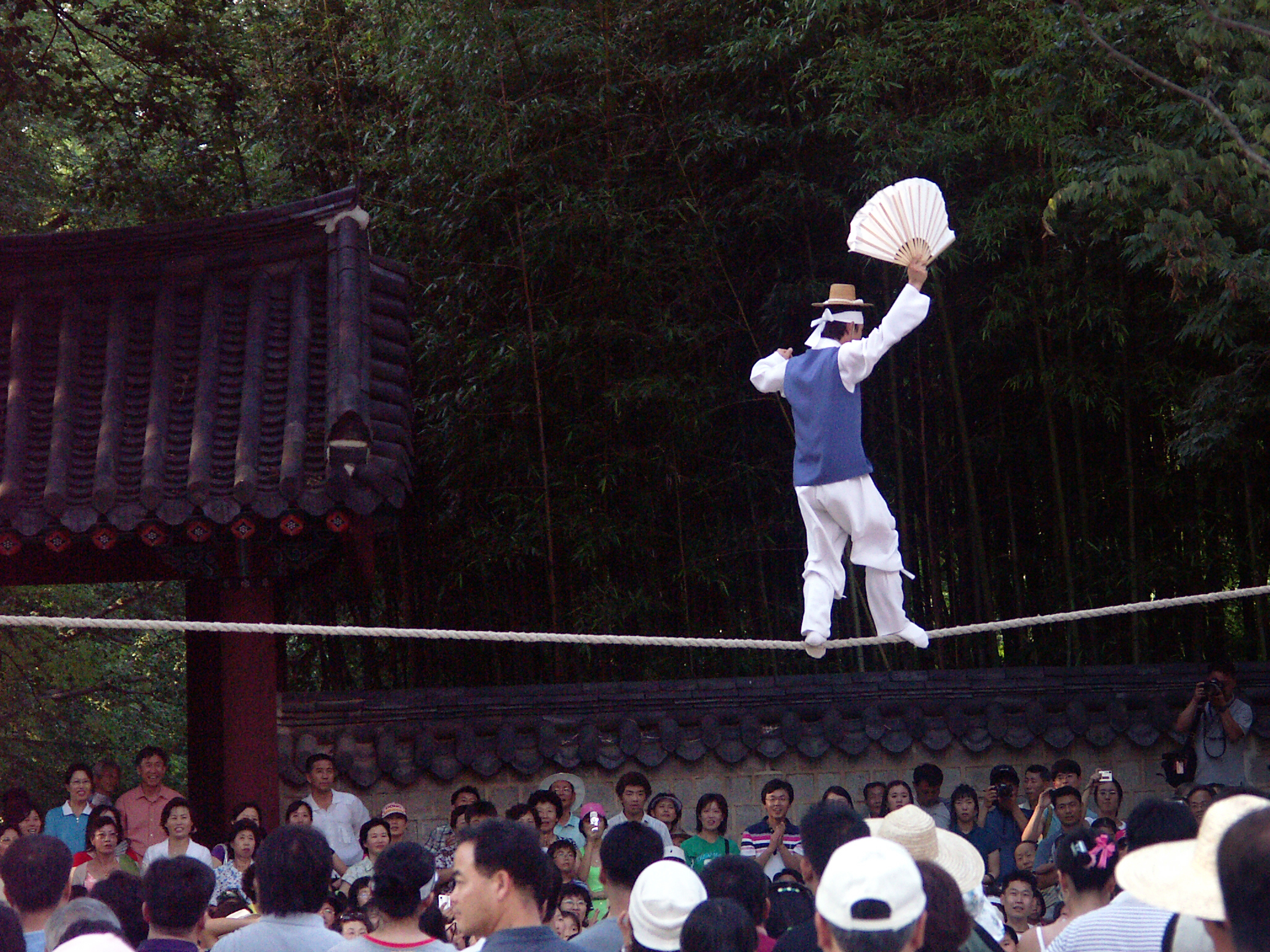
Korean tightrope-walking, Jultagi

=== Tumbling ===
Tumbling is an acrobatic skill involving rolls, twists, somersaults and other rotational activities using the whole body. Its origin can be traced to ancient China, Ancient Greece and ancient Egypt. Tumbling continued in medieval times and then in circuses and theatre before becoming a competitive sport.

== See also ==
- Acrobatic gymnastics
- List of acrobatic activities
- Maroma
- Tricking (martial arts)
- Parkour
