= Louis Soullier =

French circus director (1813–1886)

- Born: Louis Soullier; 1813; France
- Died: 1886 (aged 72–73); Toulouse, France
- Occupation: Circus proprietor
- Known for: Cirque Impérial de Louis Soullier
- Spouse: Laura de Bach (m. 1842)
- Children: 5
- Awards: Order of the Medjidie

Louis Soullier (1813 – 1886) was a French equestrian performer and circus proprietor.

== Early life ==
Louis Soullier was born in 1813.

== Career ==
In his early twenties, Louis Soullier joined the troupe of Laura de Bach, the wife of the circus director Christoph de Bach, who died in 1834. He became responsible for actively managing her and arranging her tours. In 1836, while en route to Constantinople, the troupe of Soullier and Laura de Bach performed in Lviv. A circus-amphitheatre was specially constructed in Lviv to host the De Bach-Soullier company.

His marriage to the widowed Laura de Bach took place in 1842.

Soullier became head of the Circus Gymnasticus in 1848, and he later rebranded it as the Cirque Impérial de Louis Soullier. Operating from a stationary circus in the Prater in Vienna, Austria, for six months each year, he then toured extensively, with routes extending to Turkey. His visit to Turkey had a lasting impact on him. Sultan Abdülmecid invited the circus to perform at Yildiz Kiosk in Istanbul. The Sultan, impressed by Soullier's skills, granted him the title of "Master of the Sultan's Stables" along with the Order of the Medjidie. Soullier served as an equerry to Abdülmecid I. From that point forward, he wore only Ottoman clothing and named his traveling tent the "Caravanserai."

Soullier managed the Kensington Hippodrome, where his Imperial Circus troupe performed in 1849 alongside shows at the Hippodrome de l'Étoile. He then founded an open-air venue in Lyon, France, bearing his own name in April 1850, organizing large-scale events there. That year, the French equestrian made a flight over the Hippodrome Soullier while riding a horse attached beneath a large hot air balloon.

He arrived in England by 1851, presenting the Cirque Oriental at venues including Bingley Hall in Birmingham, Manchester's Free Trade Hall, and Cremorne Gardens in London.

Soullier set out on a tour of Russia, China, and Japan in 1854. Following two years in Russia, his circus company spent several years touring Asia. He brought back Chinese and Japanese acrobats upon his return to Europe in 1866. Soullier became the first European circus proprietor to feature Chinese acrobatics in their circus program. The French circus manager introduced acts such as plate spinning and pole balancing, which he had observed during his time in China.

He brought his circus to Japan, appearing in Yokohama on August 8, 1871. Later that year in December, he secured permission to present his show on the grounds of the Yasukuni Shrine in Tokyo.

== Personal life ==
Soullier had five children. His daughter Clémentine Soullier, the only girl among them, was a talented equestrian.

== Death ==
Louis Soullier died in 1886 in Toulouse, France.

== Legacy ==
Soullier was among the earliest French circus directors to take his shows on tour across Europe.
