= Maroma =

Traditional rural circus art form of Mexico

Maroma campesina (peasant tightrope), also known as maroma, peasant circus or circus of the poor, is a traditional scenic artistic expression from southern Mexico. This practice combines elements of acrobatics, theatre, poetry, and music, and is characterized by the execution of stunts on ropes and trapezes in open-air settings.

Although historically present in various regions, its practice is currently concentrated primarily in the Mixteca region (spanning parts of the states of Oaxaca, Puebla, and Guerrero). In this area, it is considered a symbol of cultural and community identity, frequently associated with patron saint festival celebrations.

== History ==
At the end of the colonial era, within the context of the Bourbon Reforms in New Spain, the viceregal administration implemented changes aimed at modernizing administration and public morality. While Mexico City underwent urban transformations, society maintained marked stratification. In this environment, public spectacles constituted a meeting point for a diverse population, consisting of Peninsulares, criollos, Mestizos, indigenous people, and castas. Unlike the spaces exclusive to the aristocracy and bureaucracy, the maroma gathered different social strata in neighborhood patios, public plazas, and, during specific seasons, at the Real Coliseo de México.

During this period, the spectacle did not yet possess the characteristics of the modern European circus; instead, it resembled the arts of medieval minstrels, mountebanks, and tightrope walkers (volatines). Maromero troupes usually performed in plazas, courtyards, and frequently as intermission acts at palenques and bullfights. Despite their popularity, they faced surveillance from the Inquisition, which censored satire and acts considered immoral, as well as restrictions from official theaters that viewed street performers as economic competition.

The activity of the maromeros integrated physical dexterity with social satire and illusionism. The volatines, influenced by both the European medieval tradition and indigenous practices, executed stunts on ropes made of ixtle or hemp. Documents from the era record figures such as Sebastián, a tightrope walker who performed descents from the stage to the theater's gallery (cazuela) on a tight rope, sometimes carrying other acrobats or firing shots from heights.

== The Coliseo monopoly and the economy of spectacle ==
The professional activity of these artists was regulated by the monopoly of the Real Coliseo de México. This venue, administered by the Hospital Real de Naturales (Royal Hospital for Natives), depended on box office revenue to finance its charitable works. Viceregal authorities considered street maromeros and small puppet troupes to be competition that affected the income of the Crown and public charity. Consequently, regulations were established restricting independent performances within the central layout of the city or during times that overlapped with Coliseo functions.

This policy created an exception during Lent. During this liturgical period, formal comedy theater suspended activities, leaving the Coliseo without its usual income. Given this situation, the hospital administration permitted the use of the theater by maromeros, puppeteers, and tightrope walkers. Prior to their presentation, troupes had to undergo auditions before the hospital administrator to evaluate their aptitude and profitability, temporarily becoming the main entertainment in the capital.

== The Inquisition and illusionism ==
There are documentary records regarding the interaction between maromeros and the Tribunal of the Holy Office of the Inquisition. In a social context where the boundaries between science, manual skill, and the supernatural were not always clear to the general population, the tricks of so-called "sleight of hand players" were occasionally scrutinized under suspicion of sorcery. Inquisitorial archives contain proceedings against artists whose practices were investigated.

One recorded case is that of Antonio Farfán, a puppeteer prosecuted in 1729. Farfán, who traveled through the Bajío performing acts of prestidigitation—such as restoring a cut ribbon or alleged divination—was denounced under suspicion of a demonic pact, a situation exacerbated by the artist's own claims regarding the possession of occult knowledge. The Inquisition investigated these acts, considering them a risk to public faith.

Likewise, in 1769, Juan Miguel de Churumbela, a Mulatto maromero, was prosecuted. Churumbela used illusionism techniques to simulate the extraction of foreign objects from the bodies of the sick, charging for these alleged cures. His trial evidences the use of scenic skills for fraudulent purposes and ecclesiastical surveillance over practices that could contravene religious or medical orthodoxy.

The use of religious imagery in shows was also a source of conflict. The indigenous performer José Antonio de Jesús Juárez was persecuted for performing transformation tricks using prints of saints. For the Holy Office, the manipulation of sacred images in a context of profane entertainment constituted irreverence.

== Daily life, itinerancy, and organization ==
The practice of the Novohispanic maromero was characterized by itinerancy. Due to restrictions at the Coliseo in the capital, numerous troupes traveled through the provinces, moving toward destinations such as Puebla, Querétaro, Guadalajara, or Veracruz. These transfers involved risks associated with road safety and weather conditions, as well as negotiations with local authorities. Alcaldes mayores and corregidores frequently requested payments or private performances in exchange for operating permits.

Guild organization was fundamentally based on family nuclei, transmitting the trade from generation to generation, as observed in the records of families such as the Ortiz or Rato families. The division of labor usually integrated all members: men generally executed acts of strength and balance, while women and children participated in pantomimes and dances. Female participation, exemplified by figures such as "La Romanita", was a constant, although their public exposure generated diverse opinions regarding the social norms of the era.

Economic instability led many maromeros to engage in pluriactivity. Judicial files indicate that various artists declared alternative trades such as weavers, bakers, tailors, or servants, practicing maroma seasonally or complementarily as a strategy for economic subsistence.
