= List of circuses and circus owners =

There have been many famous modern circuses since the first modern circus was staged by Philip Astley in London on January 9, 1768. Many are best known by the name of their principal owner. The following is a list of both circuses and their country of origin. For more information on circuses in general see Circus, or Contemporary circus, or for information regarding the ancient Roman circus, see Circus Maximus.

== List ==
Name	Country	Status	Year(s)
Abuhadba Circo Internacional	Bolivia		
Adam Forepaugh	United States of America	Merged	1870s–1900
Aerialize Sydney Aerial Theatre	Australia	Active	1999–present
Aesthetic International Circus	China	Active	2023–present
Al G. Barnes Circus	United States of America	Defunct	1895–1938
Albert & Friends Instant Circus	United Kingdom		
Aloft Circus Arts	United States of America		1941–present
Amar Circus	India		
Antonio Franconi	Italy	Defunct	
Archaos	France	Active	1986–present
Arkhangelsk State Circus	Russia	Defunct	1929-1989
Artcirq	Canada	Active	1998–present
Asociaciones de circo en España	Spain		
Astrakhan State Circus	Russia	Active	1885–present
Baku State Circus	Azerbaijan	Active	1945–present
Batty's Hippodrome	United Kingdom (England)	Defunct	1851–1852
Belarusian State Circus	Belarus	Active	1884–present
Bertram Mills Circus	United Kingdom	Defunct	
Big Apple Circus	United States of America	Active	1977–2017; 2017–present
Billy Smart	United Kingdom	Active	1946–2015
Bindlestiff Family Cirkus	United States of America	Active	1995–present
Blackpool Tower Circus	United Kingdom	Active	1894–present
Bobby Roberts Super Circus	United Kingdom	Active	1973–present
Boswell Wilkie Circus	South Africa	Defunct	1913-2001
Bryansk state Circus	Russia	Active	1974–present
Bullen Brothers' Circus	Australia	Defunct	pre-1925–1990s
Capital Circus	Kazakhstan	Active	2005–present
Capital Circus of Budapest	Hungary	Active	1889–present
Carden International Circus	United States of America	Active	pre-1973–present
Carson & Barnes Circus	United States of America	Active	1929–present
Chaplin's Circus	United Kingdom	Defunct	1911–1985
Chelyabinsk State Circus	Russia	Under renovation	1979-2019
Chimelong International Circus	China	Active	2000–present
Chinese State Circus	United Kingdom	Active	1992–present
Chipperfield's Circus	United Kingdom	Active	1684–present
Circa	Australia	Active	1987–present
Circo Amedeo Orfei	Italy	Active	?-present
Circo Aquatico Torres	Italy	Active	?-present
Circo Armando Orfei	Italy	Active	?-present
Circo Atayde Hermanos	Mexico	Active	1888–present
Circo Braum	Italy	Active	?-present
Circo Chen	Portugal	Active	1981–present
Circo Dallas	Portugal	Active	1982–present
Circo Darix Togni	Italy	Active	1872–present
Circo de los Horrores	Spain		
Circo de Teresa Rabal	Spain		
Circo Greca Orfei	Italy	Active	1994–present
Circo Kino	Italy	Active	?-present
Circo Lidia Togni	Italy	Active	1960s-present
Circo Marina Orfei	Italy	Active	?-present
Circo Maya Orfei Madagascar	Italy	Active	?-present
Circo Moira Orfei	Italy	Active	1960–present
Circo Mundial	Portugal	Active	1994–present
Circo Orfei Tunisia	Tunisia/Italy	Active	?-present
Circo Osorio	United States of America	Active	1926–present
Circo Paolo Orfei	Italy	Active	?-present
Circo Rinaldo Orfei	Italy	Active	?-present
Circo Rolando Orfei	Italy	Active	?-present
Circo Sandra Orfei	Italy	Active	?-present
Circo Victor Hugo Cardinali	Portugal	Active	1987–present
Circuba	Cuba	Active	1968–present
Circus Aerobus	Russia	Active	?-present
Circus Amok	United States of America	Active	1989–present
Circus Aotearoa	New Zealand		
Circus Aqua - Shevchenko Show	Russia	Active	?-present
Circus Arena Makao	Russia	Active	?-present
Circus Arena Yaguar	Russia	Active	?-present
Circus Arlekin	Belarus	Active	?-present
Circus Avalon	Australia		
Circus Avtovo	Russia	Active	1995–present
Circus Bassie & Adriaan	Netherlands	Defunct	1976?–1989?
Circus Belissimo	Russia	Active	?-present
Circus Carl Busch	Germany		
Circus Contraption	United States of America	Defunct	1998–2009
Circus Crocus	Russia	Active	?-present
Circus Demidov	Russia	Active	?-present
Circus Dire Dawa	Ethiopia		
Circus Dovgalyuk	Russia	Active	?-present
Circus Extreme	United Kingdom	Active	2018–present
Circus Fantastic	Russia	Active	?-present
Circus Filatov	Russia	Active	1836–present
Circus Flora	United States of America	Active	1986–present
Circus Gatti	United States of America		1953–present
Circus Gerbola	Ireland		
Circus Graf Orlov	Russia	Active	?-present
Circus Grand	Russia	Active	?-present
Circus Hargeisa	Somaliland		
Circus Herman Renz	Netherlands	Active	1911–present
Circo Hermanos Vazquez	United States of America	Active	
Circo Hermanos Suarez	Mexico	Active	1872–Present
The Circus of Horrors	United Kingdom	Defunct	1995–2024
Circus Humberto	Czech Republic	Active	1951–present
Circus Joker	Russia	Active	?-present
Circus Joseph Ashton	Australia	Active	1847–2017
Circus Juventas	United States of America	Active	1994–present
Circus Knie	Switzerland	Active	1803–present
Circus Kolizeum	Russia	Active	?-present
Circus Krone	Germany	Active	1905–present
Circus Maska	Russia	Active	?-present
Circus Mondao	United Kingdom		
Circus Mr. Lumaca	Russia	Active	?-present
Circus Mundus Absurdus	Finland		
Circus of Tiny Invisibility	United States of America	Active?	1957–present
Circus Oasis	Bulgaria	Defunct	1991-2004; 2010–2014
Circus Olympia	Australia		
Circus Orion	Russia	Active	?-present
Circus Oz	Australia	Likely shifting from professional to voluntary	1978–2022 in doubt. See company history entry
Circus of Pepin and Breschard	United States of America	Defunct	1807–1962
Circus Redickuless	United States of America	Defunct	1995–2004
Circus Renz	Germany	Defunct	1842–1897
Circus Rio	Australia	Active	2019–present
Circus Roncalli	Germany	Active	1976–present
Circus Royale	Australia	Active	1971–present
Circus Smirkus	United States of America	Active	1987–present
Circus Sarasota	United States of America		1971–present
Circus Sunrise	Australia		
Circus Tornado	Russia	Active	?-present
Circus Tyanna	United Kingdom		
Circus Vargas	United States of America	Active	1969–present
Circus Vegas	Ireland		
Circus Vivat	Russia	Active	?-present
Circus Waldissima	United States of America	Active	1992–present
Circus Zoloto Africa	Russia	Active	?-present
Circus Zvezda	Russia	Active	1993–present
Circus Zvezdniy	Russia	Active	?-present
Cirkus Agora	Norway	Active	1989–present
Cirkus Bob Navarro King	Czech Republic	Active	2011–present
Cirkus Cirkör	Sweden	Active	1995–present
Cirkus Metropol	Czech Republic	Active	2012–present
Cirkus Šimek	Czech Republic	Active	2013–present
Cirque Amar	Algeria	Active	1924–present
Cirque Berzerk	United States of America	Active	2004—present
Cirque de Flambé	United States of America		1958–present
Cirque de la Symphonie	United States of America	Active	1991–present
Cirque du Soleil	Canada	Active	1984–present
Cirque Éloize	Canada	Active	1993–present
Cirque Italia	United States of America	Active	2012–present
Cirque International Citta' di Roma Fratelli Bizzarro	Algeria/Italy	Active	1892–present
Cirque Fernando	France	Defunct	1872–1897
Cirque Medrano	France	Active	1898–present
Cirque Nicolas Zavatta	France	Active	?-present
Cirque Plume	France	Active	1984–present
Cirque Romane Ritz	France	Active	?-present
Cirque Sébastien Zavatta	France	Active	?-present
Continental Circus Berlin	United Kingdom	Active	
Culpepper & Merriweather Circus	United States of America	Active	1985–Present
Diamond Circus of Yakutia	Russia	Active	1994–present
Dnipro State Circus	Ukraine	Active	1980–present
Donetsk State Circus	Russia(de facto)/Ukraine(de jure)	Active	1969–present
Dorato Circus	Israel		
Dream Science Circus	United States of America		1955–present
El Circo	United States of America		1948–present
End of the World Cirkus	United States of America		1943–present
Eroni's Circus	Australia	Active	2007–
Fekiland by Feki	Hungary	Active	2021-
Flynn Creek Circus	United States of America	Active	2002–
Flying Fruit Fly Circus	Australia	Active	1979–
Fossett's Circus	Ireland	Active	1888–present
Foolhardy Circus Arts	United Kingdom		
FSU Flying High Circus	United States of America	Active	1947–present
Gandey's Circus	United Kingdom	Active	1918–present
Garden Bros Circus	United States of America	Active	
Gärtner Brothers Circus	Kazakhstan/Germany	Active	?-present
Gasaui	Bolivia		
Gemini Circus	India		
Gerry Cottle's Circus	United Kingdom		1970–present
Gia Eradze's Royal Circus	Russia	Active	2007–present
Giffords Circus	United Kingdom	Active	2000-present
Golden Dragon Circus	Russia	Active	?-present
Gomel State Circus	Belarus	Active	1972–present
Gran Circus Wegliams	Italy	Active	?-present
The Bite-sized Circus - The Littlest Show on Earth	Australia		
The Great Pakistani Circus	Pakistan		
The Great American Royal Circus	United States of America		1930–present
Great British Circus	United Kingdom	Active	
Great Bombay Circus	India		
Great Indian Circus	India	Defunct	1880–1935
Great Lion Circus	India		
Great Rayman Circus	India		
Great Royal Circus	India		
Hippodrome Circus	United Kingdom	Active	1903–present
Grozny Circus	Russia	Defunct	1976-1995
Hagen's Circus	Australia	Merged	1878–1950
Hagenbeck-Wallace Circus	United States of America	Defunct	1907–1938
Hamid Circus	United States of America		1917–present
Hanoi Central Circus	Vietnam	Active	1950s-present
Happy Circus Internazionale	Italy	Active	?-present
Happy Dream Circus	Japan	Active	2010–present
Imperial Royal Circus	Italy	Active	1930-40s-present
International Circus Doha	Qatar	Active	?-present
Irkutsk State Circus	Russia	Active	1964–present
ISU Gamma Phi Circus	United States of America		1929–present
Ivanovo State Circus	Russia	Active	1933–present
Janbaz Circus	Pakistan		
Jordan World Circus	United States of America	Active	1988–present
Jumbo Circus	India		
Jim Rose Circus	United States of America	Active	1991–present
Karaganda Circus	Kazakhstan	Active	1983–present
Kazakh State Circus	Kazakhstan	Active	1970–present
Kazan Circus	Russia	Active	1890–1961; 1965–present
Kelly Miller Circus	United States of America		1938–2019
Kemerovo State Circus	Russia	Active	1932–present
Khabarovsk State Circus	Russia	Active	2001–present
Kigure New Circus	Japan	Defunct	1942–2010
Kinoshita Circus	Japan	Active	1902–present
Kirov State Circus	Russia	Active	Pre-1934-1969; 1977–present
Kislovodsk State Circus	Russia	Active	1933–present
Kostroma State Circus	Russia	Active	1928-1970; 1984–present
Krasnodar State Circus	Russia	Under renovation	1908-?; 1970-2023
Krasnoyarsk State Circus	Russia	Under renovation	1917-1930; 193?-1940; 1971-2020?
Kursk State Circus	Russia	Active	1971-1996; 2011–present
Le Grand Cirque de Rome	France	Active	?-present
Lennon Bros Circus	Australia	Active	1890–present
Lingling Circus	China	Active	2014–present
Longcheng International Circus	China	Active	2019–present
Longemont International Circus	China	Active	2018–present
Long Shadow Stilt Theatre	Australia		
Loomis Brothers Circus	United States of America	Active	1997–present
Lost in translation Circus	United Kingdom		
Lucent Dossier Experience	United States of America	Active	2004–present
Lucky Irani Circus	Pakistan	Active	1970–present
Lugansk State Circus	Russia(de facto)/Ukraine(de jure)	Active	1971–present
Magnitogorsk State Circus	Russia	Active	1931–present
McLaren Circus	South Africa	Active	2005–present
Midnight Circus	United States of America		2007–present
Moretti Circus	Russia	Active	?-present
Moscow State Circus	Russia	Active	1919–present
Nikulin’s Circus	Russia	Active	1880–present
Nizhny Novgorod State Circus	Russia	Active	1883–present
New Pickle Circus	United States of America		2015–present
Nizhny Tagil State Circus	Russia	Active	1931–present
Nofit State Circus	United Kingdom (Wales)	Active	1986–present
Novokuznetsk State Circus	Russia	Active	1935-1957; 1974–present
Novosibirsk State Circus	Russia	Active	1931–present
Omsk State Circus	Russia	Active	1898–present
P. T. Barnum	United States of America	Merged	1870–1919
Pablo Fanque's Circus Royal	United Kingdom	Defunct	1830s
Paulos Circus	United Kingdom	Active	1816-present
Perm State Circus	Russia	Active	1884–present
Perry Bros Circus	Australia		
Pickle Family Circus	United States of America	Defunct	1974–2004
Pop Circus	Japan	Active	1996–present
Pyongyang Circus	North Korea	Active	1989–present
Rajkamal Circus	India		
Rambo Circus	India		
Circus Flórián Richter	Hungary	Active	2016–present
Ringling Brothers Circus	United States of America	Merged	1884–1919
Ringling Bros. and Barnum & Bailey Circus	United States of America	Active	1919–2017; 2023-
Rostov State Circus	Russia	Active	c.1890s-present
R.T. Richards Circus	United States of America	Defunct	1917-1918
Rony Roller Circus	Italy	Active	1991?-present
Royal Hanneford Circus	United States of America	Active	1965–present
The Royal London Circus	Malaysia	Defunct?	1990–?2008
Royal Circus and Equestrian Philharmonic Academy	United Kingdom	Defunct	1782–1924
Ryazan State Circus	Russia	Active	c.1914–present
Saint Petersburg State Circus	Russia	Active	1877–present
Samara State Circus	Russia	Active	Pre-1919–present
Santus Circus	UK	Active	?-Present
Saratov State Circus	Russia	Active	1876–present
Sarrasani	Germany	Active	1912–present
Sea Breeze Circus	Azerbaijan	Active	2025–present
Sevastopol State Circus	Russia(de facto)/Ukraine(de jure)	Active	1986–present
Shanghai Circus World	China	Active	1999–present
Shibata Circus	Japan	Defunct	1923–1963
Shrine Circus	United States of America	Active	1906–present
Silvers Circus	Australia	Active	1946–1953; 1953–present
Simferopol State Circus	Russia(de facto)/Ukraine(de jure)	Active	1959–present
Sochi State Circus	Russia	Active	1971–present
Sole Brothers' Circus	Australia	Defunct	1890s–1993
Star Spangled Circus	United States of America		1926–present
Stardust Circus	Australia	Active	1990s—present
Stavropol State Circus	Russia	Active	1975–present
Stilt Circus	United States of America		1906–2020
Steel City Clown Brigade	United States of America		1952–present
Sun Island Circus World	China	Active	2023?-present
Tajik State Circus	Tajikistan	Active	1976–present
Taylor Circus Stars	United States of America		1954–present
Tbilisi Circus	Georgia	Active	1888–present
Teatro ZinZanni	United States of America	Active	1998–present
The Magic Circus of Samoa	Samoa	Active	1990–present
Three Monkeys Circus	United States of America	Acitive	2010–present
Tiger Park International Circus	China	Active	2015–present
Tirana Circus	Albania	Active	1952–present
Tsirk Circusland	Russia	Active	?-present
Tsirk Maximus	Russia	Active	2003–present
Turkmen State Circus	Turkmenistan	Active	1979–present
Tom Arnold	United Kingdom	Defunct	1930s–2003
Tom Duffy's Circus	Ireland	Active	1775–
Travelling Light Circus	United Kingdom		1968–present
Tula State Circus	Russia	Active	1870-1949; 1963–present
Tver State Circus	Russia	Under renovation	1924–2022
Two Bit Circus	United States of America		2003–present
Tyumen State Circus	Russia	Active	1897–present
Udmurtia State Circus	Russia	Active	1895–present
Ufa State Circus	Russia	Under renovation	1968–2017
Universal Circus	Italy	Active	?-present
UniverSoul Circus	United States of America	Active	1994–present
Ussuriysk State Circus	Russia	Defunct	1971–2006
Uzbek State Circus	Uzbekistan	Active	1920–present
Vau De Vire Society	United States of America		2000–present
Venardos Circus	United States of America	Active	2014–present
Vladivostok Circus	Russia	Active	1973–present
Volgograd State Circus	Russia	Under renovation	1967–2023
Voronezh State Circus	Russia	Under renovation	1882–2024
Wanderlust Circus	United States of America	Active	2006–present
Webers Circus	Australia	Active	2007–present
Whiteway Circus	India		
Will-o'-the-Wisp Fire Circus	Australia		
Wirth's Circus	Australia	Defunct	1882–1963
Wuqiao Acrobatics World	China	Active	1993–present
Yano Circus	Japan	Defunct	1916–1996
Yaroslavl State Circus	Russia	Active	1937-1943; 1963–present
Yekaterinburg Circus	Russia	Under renovation	1980–2023
Zippos Circus	United Kingdom	Active	1986–present
Zirka Circus	New Zealand		
Zoppé Family Circus	United States of America	Active	1842–present
Name	Country	Status	Year(s)

== See also ==
- History of Indian circus
