= Brian Wenzel =

Australian actor (1929–2024)

- A Country Practice star Brian Wenzel
- Born: Brian Thomas Wenzel; 24 May 1929; Adelaide, South Australia, Australia
- Died: 6 May 2024 (aged 94); South Australia, Australia
- Occupations: Actor; comedian; director; singer
- Years active: 1943–1995, 2002, 2009–2014
- Known for: A Country Practice (TV series) as Frank Gilroy; Rove Live (TV series) (recurring)
- Spouse: Linda Wenzel (m. 1953)

Brian Thomas Wenzel (24 May 1929 – 6 May 2024) was an Australian actor, comedian, director and singer. He was in the entertainment business for 60 years, including circus, stage, television and film.

After numerous character roles in Crawford Productions serials and films, and after appearing in the ABC serial Certain Women and The Young Doctors, he was cast in the permanent role of Frank Gilroy, an old-fashioned and upright police sergeant (later chef and barman) of the fictional Wandin Valley in A Country Practice, opposite co-star Lorrae Desmond, which he played from 1981 to 1993.

Wenzel had a small role in 1995 in Neighbours as Gordon "Flakey the Clown" Orchard. He was also briefly a cast member of Rove Live in 2009.

== Life and career ==
=== Early life ===
Wenzel was born in the city of Adelaide, South Australia to a family of German descent and is one of eight children of Harold Wenzel, a grocer who served with the RAAF, and Kathleen Mabel McDonnell.

Wenzel grew up in Western suburbs of Adelaide including Mile End, Thebarton. Torrensville. and then some time in Mt. Gambier, before moving to Geelong, Victoria and had an unsettled early life and spent much of his childhood in remand homes run by various organisation's including the Christian Brothers and the Salvation Army. Wenzel ran away several times. At age 14, he left school and to stay out of trouble was offered a job, as a pony groomer and dog trainer, by a chap with the Sole Brothers' Circus, eventually he would be offered a job in the ring riding the Broncos. During World War II, he was criticised because of his German Prussian surname.

=== Early theatre ===
Wenzel in the post-WWII years started acting professionally in 1945 when his first performance in an acting role came at the age of 16 in a comedy stage play. He subsequently appeared in numerous stage roles, musicals, pantomime and children's theatre, including productions of Death of a Salesman, The Crucible, The Imaginary Invalid and Summer of the Seventeenth Doll. He also worked with the Adelaide Festival of Arts and the South Australian Theatre Company.

=== Television and film ===
After many years in the entertainment industry, primarily in live comedy and theatre, Wenzel appeared on the small screen starting from the late 1960s, including the Crawford Production drama series Division 4, Matlock Police and Homicide, as well as The Young Doctors, Cop Shop and Certain Women. In 1972, he and his wife Linda moved to Sydney in order for Wenzel to do full-time acting. It was the role in Certain Women that won him the part of old-fashioned and affable policeman Frank Gilroy, originally a constable and later a sergeant, in A Country Practice. He appeared in the series from its inception in 1981, winning a Silver Logie for his role. Later episodes would eventually see Gilroy retire from the police force to become the local RSL club's barman and chef after the original owner, "Cookie" (Syd Heylen), retired. He also had a guest role playing a NSW Police officer in the series Home Sweet Home with John Bluthal. Wenzel became very popular with the NSW Police due to his role as Sgt Gilroy. He was once presented with a leather police jacket from former commissioner John Avery as the fictional country town of Wandin Valley was located in New South Wales. Wenzel did not reprise his role as Frank Gilroy when A Country Practice was revived for a single season in 1994.

Wenzel appeared in many Australian films during the 1970s and 1980s, including Caddie (1976), The Odd Angry Shot (1979) and Alison's Birthday (1981). He also appeared in the 2014 crime thriller John Doe: Vigilante.

=== Rove Live and advertising ===
Wenzel was a semi-recurring presence on the Rove McManus light entertainment series Rove Live in 2009. Wenzel also appeared in a television advertisement for the Advance Medical Institute in a role about sexual dysfunction therapy. His Sgt Gilroy character (now 80 years old) arrives to save the day when a newlywed wife complains about her husband "speeding" in bed and then prosecutes him in court. The advertisement created much controversy and Wenzel was featured on A Current Affair, defending the advertisement and stating that he was "an actor and this is what I do" and being thrown into the spotlight after almost 15 years out of it. In May 2009, he appeared on a spoof of the advertisement which was aired on Rove Live.

== Personal life and death ==
Wenzel was married to his English-born wife Linda Wenzel for 70 years.

He was an Australia Day ambassador for the state of Victoria and a lifelong supporter of the Carlton Football Club.

Wenzel had two mini strokes in 2018. He went into an Adelaide nursing home in September 2022 with dementia, and died on 6 May 2024, at the age of 94.

== Awards ==
Event	Year	Award	Production	Results
Logie Awards of 1983	1983	Best Supporting Actor in a Series	A Country Practice as Sgt. Frank Gilroy	Won

== Filmography ==
Year	Title	Role
1968	Hunter	Harrison – Sargeant Reynolds
1970	The Long Arm	Det. Sgt Harrison
1972–1973	Boney	Sgt. Cox
1967–1973	Homicide	8 roles
1971–1973	Matlock Police	7 roles
1969–1973	Division 4	10 roles
1974	Movin' On	
1973–74	Ryan	3 roles
1973–74	The Evil Touch	Mr. Jiggs
1973–1976	Certain Women	Barry Gardiner
1976	Caddie	Doctor
1976	The Young Doctors	Mr. Cox
1979	Glenview High	
1979	The Odd Angry Shot	Bill's Dad
1979	Ride on Stranger	Detective
1980	Skyways	Frank Richmond
1980	Young Ramsay	Ken Cooper
1981	Punishmnent	Wally Webber
1981	Alison's Birthday	Police sergeant
1982	Deadline	ASIO agent
1981–1993	A Country Practice	Frank Gilroy
1995	Neighbours	Gordon "Flakey the Clown" Orchard
2002	Marshall Law	Murray
2014	John Doe: Vigilante	Judge
