= Ringling brothers =

Founders of the Ringling Brothers Circus

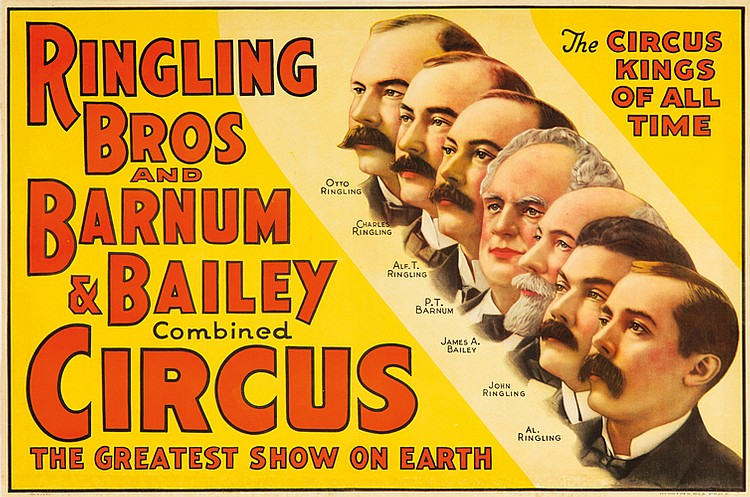

The Ringling brothers (originally Rüngling) were five American siblings who transformed their small touring-company of performers into one of the largest circuses in the United States during the late 19th and early 20th centuries. Four brothers were born in McGregor, Iowa: Alfred T., Charles, John and Henry William; the family lived in McGregor for twelve years, from 1860 until 1872. The Ringling family then moved to Prairie du Chien, Wisconsin, and finally settled in Baraboo, Wisconsin, in 1875. They were of German and French descent, the children of harness-maker Heinrich Friedrich August Ringling (1826–1898) of Hanover, and of Marie Salome Juliar (1833–1907) of Ostheim, in Alsace. Of the seven Ringling brothers, Alfred, Charles, John, Al and Otto Ringling were the main brothers in charge of the circus shows. All of the brothers were Freemasons. In 1919, they merged their Ringling Brothers Circus with America's other leading circus troupe, Barnum and Bailey, ultimately creating the Ringling Bros. and Barnum & Bailey Circus, which has operated continuously since except for a hiatus from 2017 to 2023.

== Siblings ==
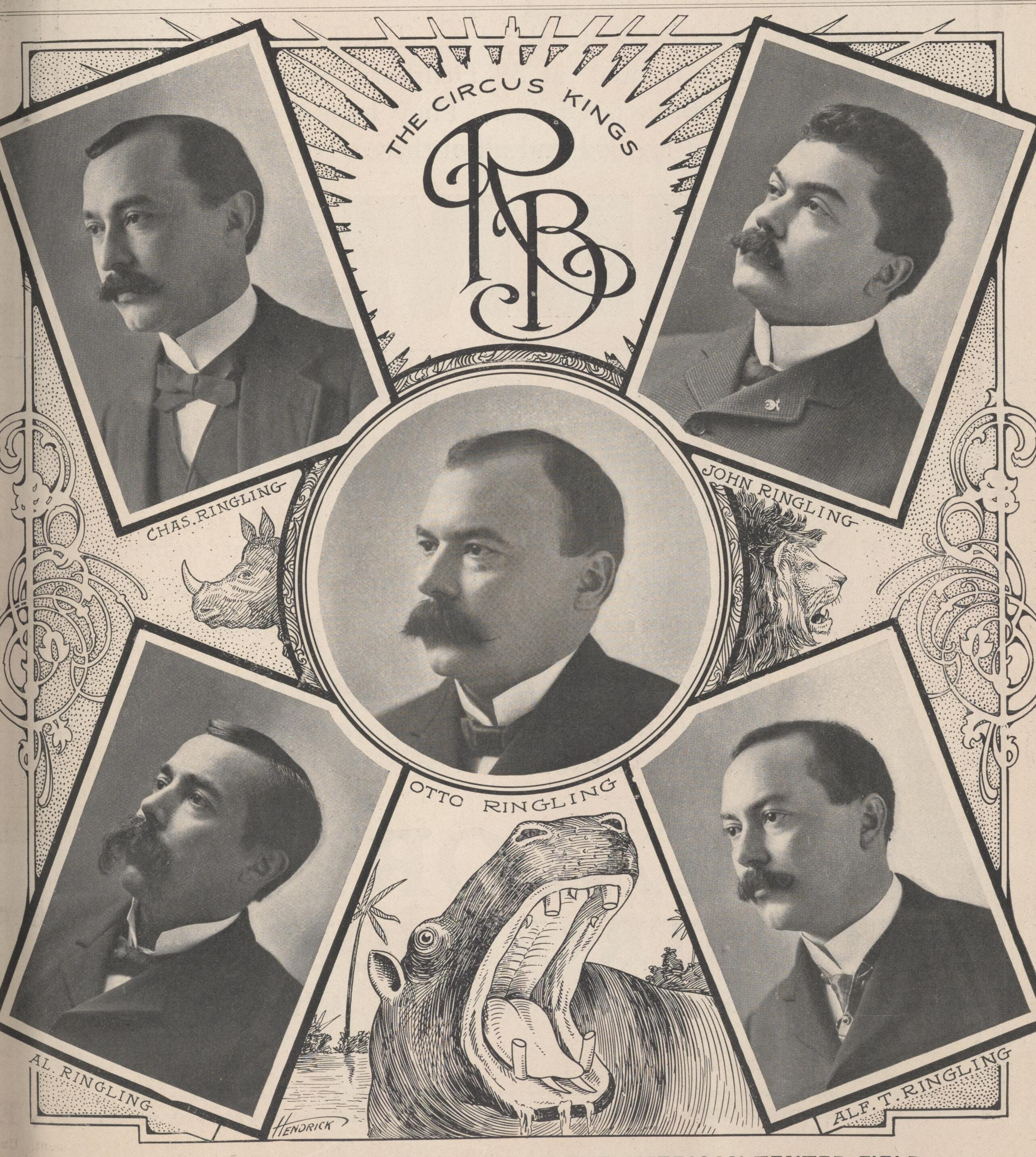
Five of the Ringling brothers: Charles, John, Otto, Al, and Alf

- Albert Carl "Al" Ringling (1852–1916). Albert was married to Eliza "Lou" Morris in 1883. In the early years of the circus, Lou managed and made wardrobe and worked as a horse performer, snake charmer and even a teamster when needed. Al filed for divorce in 1914 although there is no evidence it was concluded as Lou is listed as his widow and inherited his estate. Al died of Bright's disease at the age of 63 in Wisconsin.
- Augustus "Gus" Ringling (1854 – December 18, 1907). A founder of the circus, Augustus was largely self-educated. He died at age 53 from complications of various diseases at a sanatorium in New Orleans, where he had arrived two weeks earlier hoping the warmer climate would help his condition.
- Otto Ringling (1858–1911). Otto died at the home of his younger brother John, who lived on Fifth Avenue in Manhattan. He was in New York at the time to see a show at Madison Square Garden.
- Alfred Theodore "Alf" Ringling (1861–1919). Alfred was a juggler. He had a son, Richard T. Ringling, and a daughter, Marjorie Joan Ringling, who was married to future United States Senator Jacob K. Javits from 1933 to 1936. His granddaughter, Mabel Ringling, married Richard Durant, an elephant trainer. In 1916, Alfred took up residence in Petersburg, New Jersey, now known as Oak Ridge, where he was responsible for the creation of Lake Swannanoa, the body of water that would later become the center point of the Lake Swannanoa lake community. The property was also used as the winter quarters for his son Richard's circus, the R.T. Richards Circus. Alfred died in his 28-room New Jersey manor, three years after its completion, on October 21, 1919.
- Charles Edward Ringling (1863–December 3, 1926).
- John Nicholas Ringling (1866–1936). John was a singer and a professional clown. John and Charles were among the business brains of the operation; it was their decision to move the circus to Sarasota, Florida.
- Henry William George Ringling (1869–1918). Henry was the youngest of the brothers, and died October 10, 1918, of a heart disorder and other internal organ disorders.
- Ida Loraina Wilhelmina Ringling (1874–1950). Ida married Harry Whitestone North (1858–1921) in 1902. Their sons were John Ringling North and Henry Ringling North. She was the only girl and the youngest sibling.
