= Lennon Bros Circus =

Lennon's Circus (established circa 1893) was a circus that tours in Australia. Its touring schedule covered Australia from the remotest towns to the largest cities. It would tour for 11 months, completing each season in late November.

== History ==
Lennon's Circus was started by Mary Lennon in 1893. The Lennon family were the only circus family in Australia to make their own circus big tops and marquees. They also made SuperTents for rock concerts such as Homebake and The Big Day Out.

It was one of only three circuses left in Australia with big cats in their programme. The three lions from different litters, Kovu, Masie and Kiara, were retired to Zambi Wildlife Retreat in 2018.

The circus's last performance was in Loganholme, Queensland on 23 April 2023. The official circus website has been closed, although the Lennon Bros Circus Facebook page is still functioning. Descendents of Mary Lennon are still involved in circuses in Australia. Jan and Lindsay Lennon own Stardust Circus, Shane Lennon owns Hudsons Circus while Warren and Danielle Lennon own The Studio of Performing Arts SOPA in Ipswich, Queensland, Australia's only Dance + Circus school that is also a registered provider of School aged childcare.

== Performance ==
The Lennon Bros Circus showcased a wide variety of circus arts such as tumblers, flying trapeze, hula hoops, acrobats, double wheel of death, aerialists and clowns. Animals previously included Liberty horses, liberty donkeys, monkeys, camels, llamas, goats, geese, lions and dogs. The circus employed a staff of 35 people, ranging in age from 3 years to 65 years. The circus was moved on 14 trucks, 2 semi trailers and 14 caravans.

== See also ==
- List of circuses and circus owners
