= Silvers Circus =

Australian circus

Silver's Circus
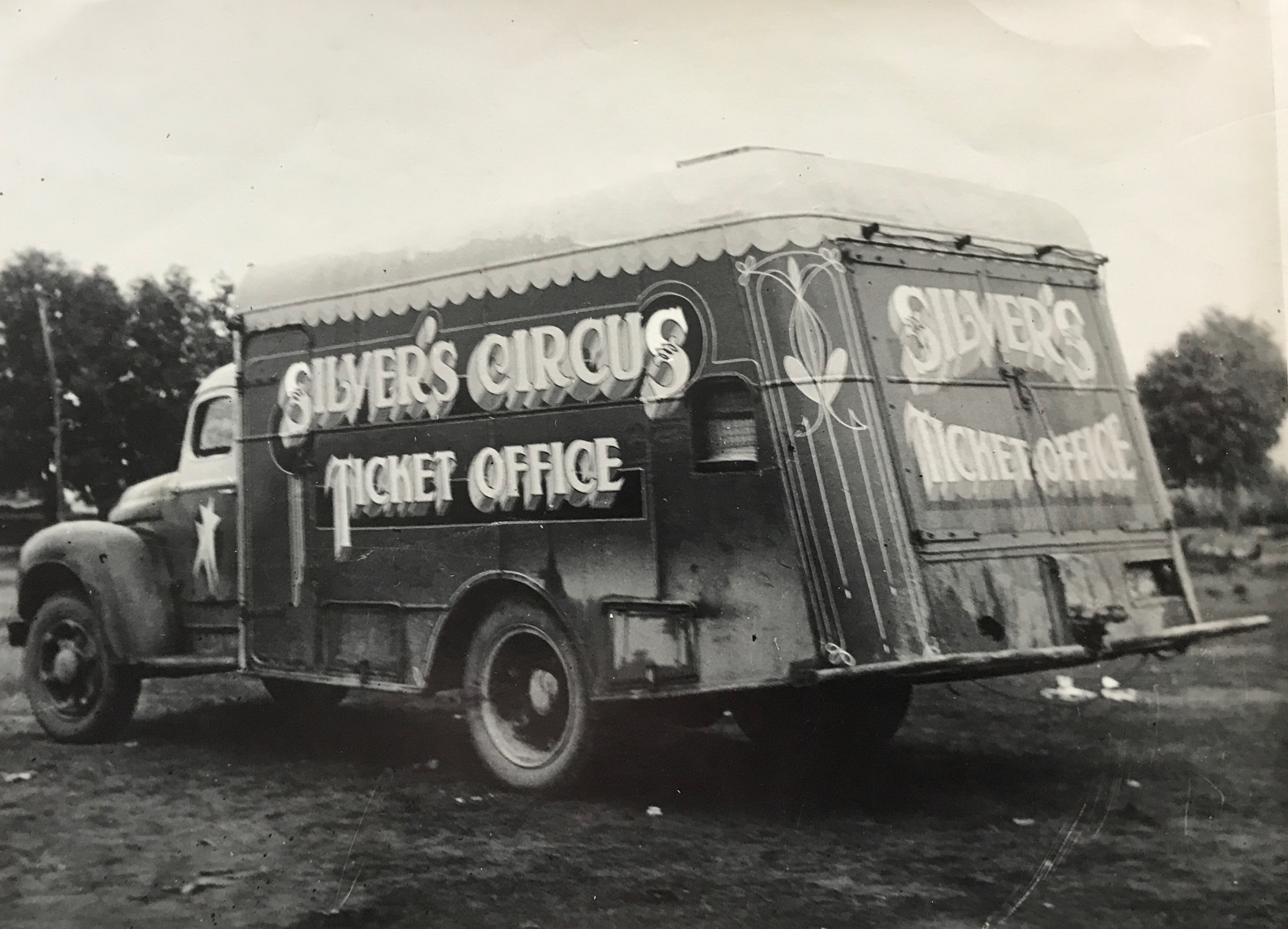
- Silver's Circus Ticket Office truck 1950s.

Origin
- Country: Australia
- Founder(s): David Hardie Snr; Mervyn King; Les Hardie; David Hardie Jnr
- Year founded: 1946 to 1953 (David Hardie Snr); 1953 - 1976 (??); 1976 - Present ( Anton and Anna Gasser as Silvers Grand Magic Circus)

Information
- Traveling show?: Yes
- Website: www.silverscircus.com.au

Silver's Circus was an Australian circus started by Mervyn King and entrepreneur David Hardie Snr. and his two sons Les and David Jnr.

== History ==
The original Silver's Circus was founded by Mervyn King and David Hardie Snr, Les Hardie and David Hardie Jnr, the Hardie family in Sydney NSW in 1946.

The professional name of 'Silvers' was chosen for the circus, inspired by the neon sign King saw flashing one night outside a Sydney restaurant, The Silver Grill. King's circus expertise combined with the financial and technical support of the Hardies proved a winning combination. An official opening was given at Jude's Corner, Rockdale. King took the stage name of Alwyn Silver as 'there had to be a Mr. Silver around the show' as Ring Master. Within five years, Silver's Circus was Australia's largest road show and toured every state of the Australian mainland.

Silvers Circus became one of the most well organized, best looking and popular circuses in the country. It also was the first to cross the Nullarbor by road, then a corrugated dirt tracks full of potholes and bulldust. The company was dissolved at the peak of its success in 1953, but other companies revived the name of 'Silver' in years to follow.

King, an orphan, was given to St. Leons Circus at the age of seven. He spent his entire life performing in the ring and became one of the Australian Circus' best known animal trainers and acrobats. He started with a first-class lion act and training show horses. When Silver's was sold in 1953, King admitted later that the sale was premature since TV didn't make much of an impact on Australian rural life until well into the 1960s. He saw television as a threat. Mervyn King had two sons. He died in 2003 at age 96.

Although it's not the original circus, the name Silver's Circus still travels Australia. It is run by Anton and Anna Gasser and has been since 1976.

== Second incarnation ==
In 1976, Anton and Anna continued Silvers Circus in Australia. Their three children Tony, Rosita and Dominik, have all followed in the family's legacy to become circus artists. A two-hour TV spectacular was filmed in Sydney and was viewed by European and American audiences. Silvers was voted as "One of the best Ten Circuses in the world" in 1982. With artists continually arriving from all parts of the world, Silvers are proud of the ever-changing program they are able to present. Rosita and Dominik, along with their parents, still currently perform and direct Silvers Circus, whilst their eldest son, Tony, and his wife, Debbie, run a company called Unique Attractions.

Ross Skiffington was the creator, writer, director and ringmaster of Silver's Grand Magic Circus. Gordon Arnie was the set designer; Wendy Dalton, Sue McCrohon and Bruce Wood were assistant dancers. It was a theatrical presentation of grand illusions in a circus environment that played to more than 150,000 people in 10 months. It toured Victoria, Tasmania, New South Wales and South Australia. It continues to this day.

== See also ==
- List of circuses and circus owners
