= Webers Circus =

Australian travelling circus

- Type: Private
- Industry: Circus
- Founded: 2006
- Founders: Natalie Weber; Rudy Weber
- Headquarters: Australia
- Area served: Australia
- Key people: Natalie Weber (manager)
- Products: Travelling tented circus performances
- Website: www.weberscircus.com

Webers Circus is an Australian travelling circus founded by Natalie and Rudy (Rüdiger) Weber in 2006 after dissolving a partnership of 13 years with Rudy's brother Harry who still runs the Weber Bros Circus in New Zealand. Natalie's mother is Janice Lennon of the Stardust Circus.

== History ==
Natalie and Rudy Weber began operating their own show in 2006 after ending a thirteen-year partnership with Rudy's brother Harry in New Zealand. Natalie Weber is the daughter of Janice Lennon, who ran the Stardust Circus with her husband Lindsay.

Both proprietors came to the venture from established performing careers. Natalie Weber grew up in a circus family and first appeared at the age of five in a tumbling act alongside her father and siblings, moving afterwards into aerial work and horse riding. She performed on the aerial trapeze with her sister Linda before moving away from high-risk acts. The couple had earlier worked on the stage productions Cats, Grease, Shout! and Long Way to the Top, and had been involved in producing and touring The Great Moscow Circus and Cirque Le Voyageuse.

In 2009 Natalie Weber said that audiences were returning to traditional circus after a period in which cinema had drawn them away, attributing the revival in part to the spread of circus schools and to the use of circus imagery by popular musicians. Several long-established Australian family circuses, among them Ashton's, Sole's and Alberto's, had closed during the 1990s under the combined pressure of limited funding and regulatory costs.

== Performances ==
The company has remained small and predominantly familial. Fifteen performers were touring in 2009. By mid-2011 the troupe numbered sixteen and consisted of the Webers, their daughters Wonita, Dakota and Wonona, a son-in-law, an infant grandson and roughly ten other artists drawn from abroad. The cast had reached twenty-five by 2012, with artists from circus families in Colombia, Germany, Hungary, New Zealand and Australia. In 2018 the same number of performers travelled within a party of thirty-four, children included.

The program has combined aerial and ground work with comedy. Acts reported over the years include clowns, acrobats, dancers, trained dogs, miniature ponies, the wheel of death and a Russian swing. Some of the material is of long standing: Natalie Weber described the Russian swing as a nineteenth-century act that the show had revived. A number of the acrobats engaged by the circus had previously competed for Australia in gymnastics.

The 2011 production followed a South American theme and dispensed with a ringmaster, which Wonita Weber said kept the pace of the show quick between speciality acts. Her younger sister Wonona, then ten, performed somersaults from the Russian swing and had appeared in the ring for as long as she could remember. The wheel of death was taken in 2012 by a Colombian artist.

By 2018 the show was staged as a Wild West production of roughly fifteen acts, lasting close to two hours with a fifteen-minute interval, under a tent seating five hundred. Jansen Grant, who had joined the previous year from the defunct Ashton Circus with his wife Acacia, performed the wheel of death, including blindfolded, while she presented a hand-balancing act. Rudy Weber, formerly one of ten performers in a Russian swing act, had suspended his own appearances because of an arm injury.

=== Animals ===
The circus works only with domestic animals and has said that no wild or exotic species appear in its performances. It travelled in 2009 with four miniature ponies and seven dogs, the latter trained by Natalie Weber for an act with her younger daughters. Wonita Weber described the restriction to domestic animals in 2011 as making the show more environmentally friendly than others touring at the time. Pony rides have been sold to audiences before performances.

== Operations ==
Natalie Weber manages the business and handles its marketing. She gave weekly running costs in 2009 as approximately $25,000, covering registration, wages, advertising, fuel, feed and veterinary care, and said that most income was returned to the show rather than drawn out, with loans from its first three years still outstanding. The tent in use at that time had been bought from Italy for $75,000, and Rudy Weber built the seating and the cupola carrying the rigging and winches himself. He has also maintained the vehicles and equipment on which the tour depends. The convoy comprised three semi-trailers and eighteen caravans in 2018.

Members of the company generally fill several roles apiece, a necessity Natalie Weber attributed to the economics of family circus: performers seeking to specialise, she said, had to look overseas. Revenue has been strongest in the cooler months. Children travelling with the show were taught at home in 2009, and by 2018 the circus employed a teacher of its own and carried a dedicated mobile classroom.

== Touring ==
The circus spends about forty-eight weeks of the year on the road, visiting towns across Australia. It gave more than 230 performances annually as of 2018. Although country audiences have formed its core, Natalie Weber observed in 2009 that city families, particularly in Adelaide and Melbourne, were showing renewed interest.

Engagements have been concentrated in New South Wales. The show completed what was then its longest run in a single location at Warriewood in northern Sydney in November 2009 before moving to Gosford. A tour of the state's south in 2011 took in Young, Yass, Goulburn and Wagga Wagga, where sixteen performances were given at Bolton Park, and continued to Moss Vale Showground. Visits to the Hunter Region have included Swansea and Richardson Park at Hamilton in 2012, and Croudace Bay, Bateau Bay and Morisset in 2018.

== See also ==
- List of circuses and circus owners
