= Tbilisi Circus =

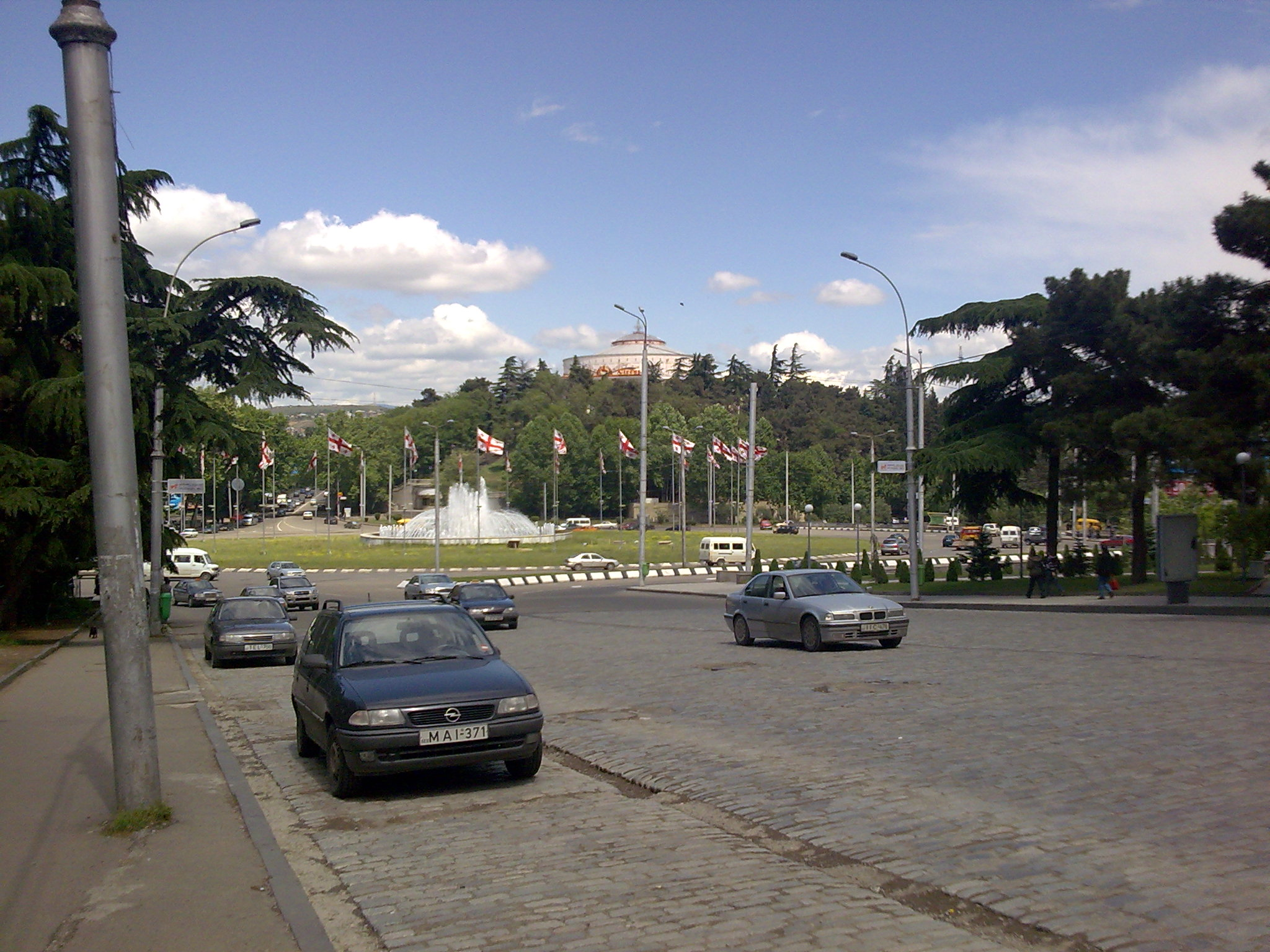
- Tbilisi Circus overlooking Heroes' Square in 2008
- Interactive map of the Tbilisi Circus area

General information
- Type: Rotunda
- Architectural style: Stalinist architecture
- Location: Tbilisi, Georgia
- Coordinates: 41°42′51″N 44°47′6″E
- Construction started: 1939
- Completed: 1940

Design and construction
- Architects: Nikolay Neprintsev, Vladimer Urushadze, Stepan Satunts

The Tbilisi Circus (Georgian: თბილისის ცირკი) is the main circus in Tbilisi, the capital of Georgia. It is housed in a Soviet-era Neoclassical rotunda building built in 1939 on a hilltop overlooking Heroes' Square.

== History ==
=== Early history ===
The history of the Tbilisi circus began in 1888, when the city was part of the Russian Empire. Its original big top building was destroyed in a fire in 1911 and the circus was moved to a former wine factory, before settling down, in 1939, in its present Neoclassical, Joseph Stalin-era building designed by Nikolay Neprintsev, Vladimer Urushadze, and Stepan Satunts. The building sits on a hill on the right bank of the Kura river, near what had been the end of the Georgian Military Road at the entrance to the city in the imperial era. The hill had also been known for a cast iron cross, named the Vera Cross after the historical neighborhood, erected in 1847 to commemorate the survival of the emperor Nicholas I in a road accident during his visit to the Caucasus in 1837. The cross was demolished and the area around it was organized into Heroes' Square under the rule of Lavrenti Beria in the 1930s. With its 2,000-seat capacity, the Tbilisi Circus was ranked among the largest circuses in the Soviet Union, alongside those of Moscow, Kiev, and Baku.

=== Renovation ===
A civil unrest and economic collapse in post-Soviet Georgia terminated the circus's heyday in the 1990s. The building fell into disrepair and its territory became notorious for "after-hours" street prostitution. In 2003, the Georgian tycoon Badri Patarkatsishvili bought the circus and began an extensive reconstruction, but his involvement in the 2007 political crisis and death shortly thereafter stalled the renovations. His sister, Mzia Tortladze, was able to reopen the circus only in 2011. Since then, the circus has been playing to sellout crowds, bringing together troupes and performers from various parts of the world.
