= Sole Brothers' Circus =

Australian circus

Sole Brothers Circus

Origin
- Country: Australia
- Founder(s): William Alfred Sole, Eliza Jane Perry
- Year founded: late. 1890s
- Defunct: 1993

Information
- Travelling show?: Yes- Toured Australia, New Zealand, South Africa
- Circus tent?: Yes
- Type of acts: Various

Sole Brothers' Circus, also known as Sole Bros. Circus was an Australian circus which toured Australia, New Zealand and South Africa.

The circus was started by circus bandsman William Alfred Sole (died June 1923) and his wife Eliza Jane Perry. Eliza was the daughter of William George Perry, who swapped his pub for a small circus in the 1870s, and was known professionally as E.G. Eroni owner of Eroni's Circus

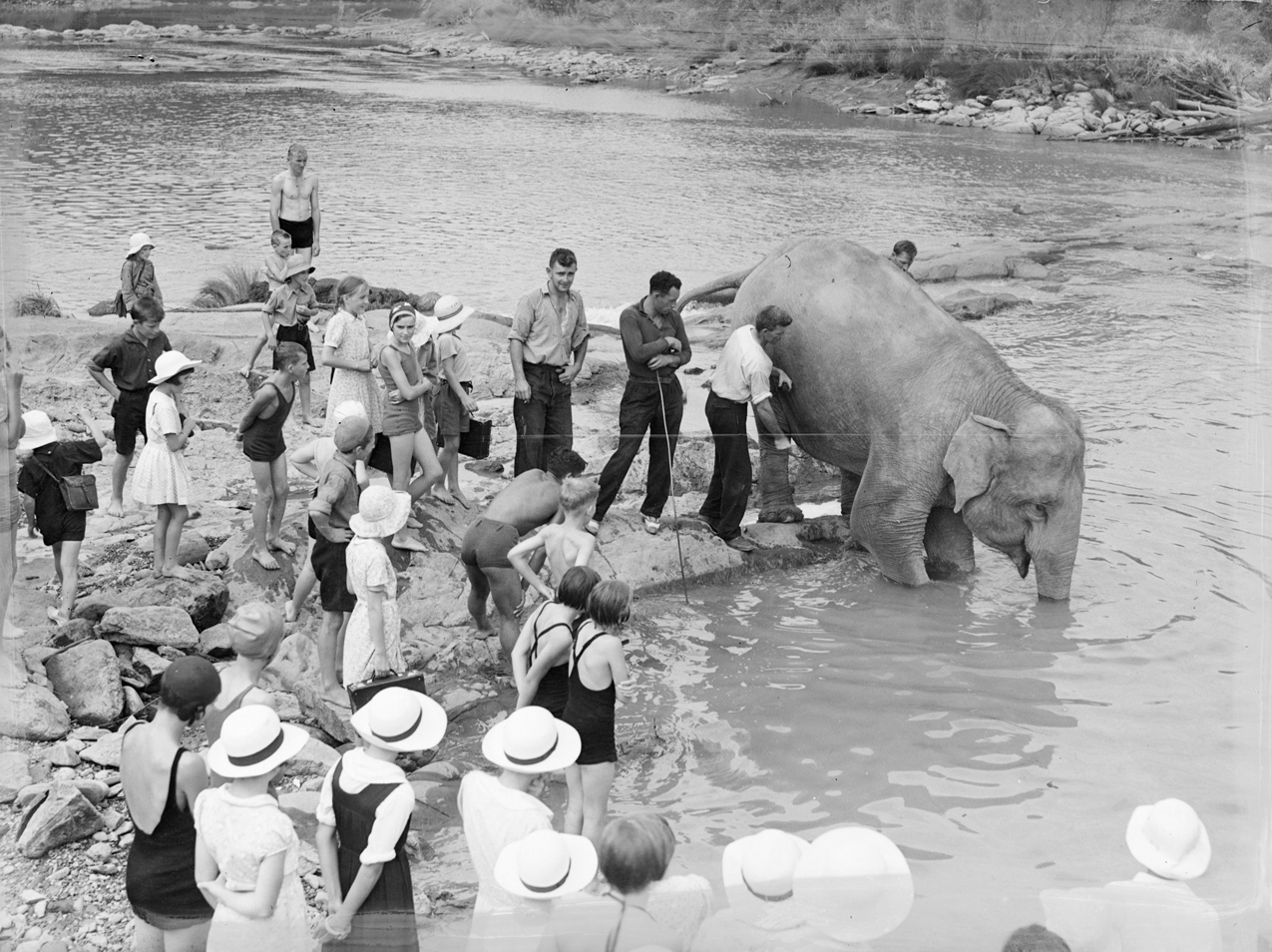
A crowd watching Sole Brothers' elephant bathing in the river at Warkworth, New Zealand

William and Eliza had six children who all performed in the circus. Andy and Jack Sole were "world-renowned jockey riders".

From 1926 to 1929, the circus performed three seasons in South Africa. While in the Congo, they performed for the King of the Belgians. They then took time off from performing to prospect for diamonds. They returned to Australia in 1929. Joseph Kevin (Joe) Perry later married Jean Sole and became managing director and proprietor of Sole Brother's Circus.

The circus made headlines in 1936 in Brisbane, when a lioness broke into the tiger enclosure and a fight broke out in front of a live audience.

== See also ==
- List of circuses and circus owners
