= R. T. Richards Supreme Show of the World =

Short-lived semi-motorized nepotism project

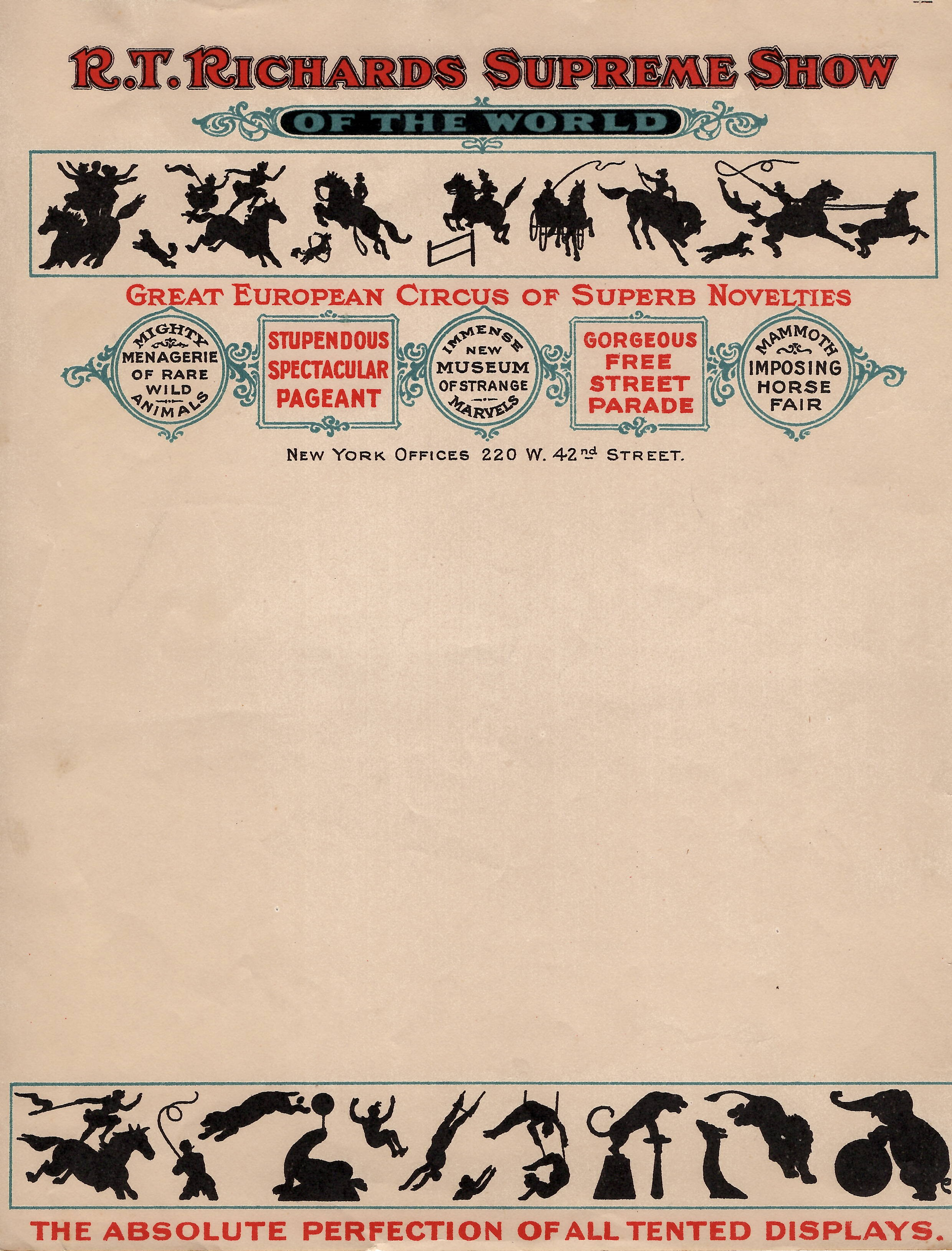
This letterhead for the R.T. Richards Supreme Show of the World was used in 1917-18 (Chris Berry Collection)

R.T. Richards Supreme Show of the World was a short-lived early 20th-century American circus that toured during the 1917 and 1918 seasons. This circus was notable as an attempt to create a "hybrid overland-motorized show" (using a combination of trucks and wagons, and rail lines for transport).

== Founding ==
Founded by Alfred T. Ringling's son, Richard T. Ringling (1895–1931) in 1917, it was based out of Ringling Manor in Jefferson Township, New Jersey. The name of the circus was a reversal of the younger Ringling's personal name.

Young Richard T. Ringling was known for his "reckless behavior" and pursuit of decadent indulgences. The circus was essentially a gift from his father, who was hoping to persuade his child to fall in love with the family business. However, the younger Ringling "lacked gusto" or genuine interest in the circus industry and was generally said to have "failed miserably taking out the quasi-motorized R.T. Richards Circus in 1917."

== Decline ==
There was an attempt to improve procedures for the 1918 season but the U.S. entrance into World War I made logistics an even greater challenge for non-essential civilian projects like circuses. The R.T. Richards Circus is remembered for proving "that operating a hybrid circus with selective use of railroad show procedures would not work."

== Elephants ==
Richard Ringling bought five elephants for this circus from William Preston Hall. One of these elephants was Black Diamond who later killed several people during the Al G. Barnes Circus parade in Corsicana, Texas on October 12, 1929.

== See also ==
- List of circuses and circus owners
