= Aerialize Sydney Aerial Theatre =

Australian circus school

Aerialize Sydney Aerial Theatre is a Sydney-based circus school and performing arts organisation. It was founded in 1999 by Shelalagh McGovern and Aimee Thomas. The organisation is run by a board of directors and is classified as a not-for-profit organisation and non-governmental organisation in Sydney, New South Wales, Australia. Aerialize runs circus classes ranging from beginner to professional skill levels and is a training space for professional and recreational circus artists.

Originally founded in the Addison road Community Centre in Marrickville, Sydney, the aerial theatre organisation took up residency in the ‘Great Hall’ before moving to Canterbury, NSW.

Aerialize performed at the 2000 Summer Olympics in Sydney at the Opening Ceremony.

== Performance history ==
Aerialize has been a host for circus events and performed at festivals and events such as the Sydney Fringe Festival and Adelaide Fringe Festival. Aerialize has won several awards for performances created for arts festivals. This includes winning the Sydney Fringe Festival awards for 'Outstanding Independent Artist Award' and 'Exceptional Achievement in Production and Design Award' in 2010 for the production 'Clammy Glamour from the Curio Cabinet', and 'Best Physical Theatre and Circus Award' and 'Director's Choice award' in 2015 for the production 'Aeon'.

== Performance Awards and Nominations ==
Year	Show	Host	Award
2010	Clammy Glamour from the Curio-Cabinet – Directed by Simone O’brien and Annabelle Lines.	Carriage Works	Winner: 2010 Sydney Fringe Festival - Most Outstanding Independent Artist
2010	Clammy Glamour from the Curio-Cabinet – Directed by Simone O’brien and Annabelle Lines.	Carriage Works	Winner: 2010 Sydney Fringe Festival - Most Outstanding Design and Production
2015	Insomni-air: The Art Of Dropping off – Directed by Bel Macedone	Sydney Fringe Festival	Winner: 2015 Sydney Fringe Festival - Physical Theatre & Circus Award
2015	Insomni-air: The Art Of Dropping off – Directed by Bel Macedone	Sydney Fringe Festival	Winner: 2015 Sydney Fringe Festival - Directors Choice Award
2016	Aeon – Directed by Rick Everett	Sydney Fringe Festival	Winner: Best Physical Theatre and Circus award
2016	Aeon – Directed by Rick Everett	Sydney Fringe Festival	Winner: Director’s choice
