= Stardust Circus =

Australian travelling circus

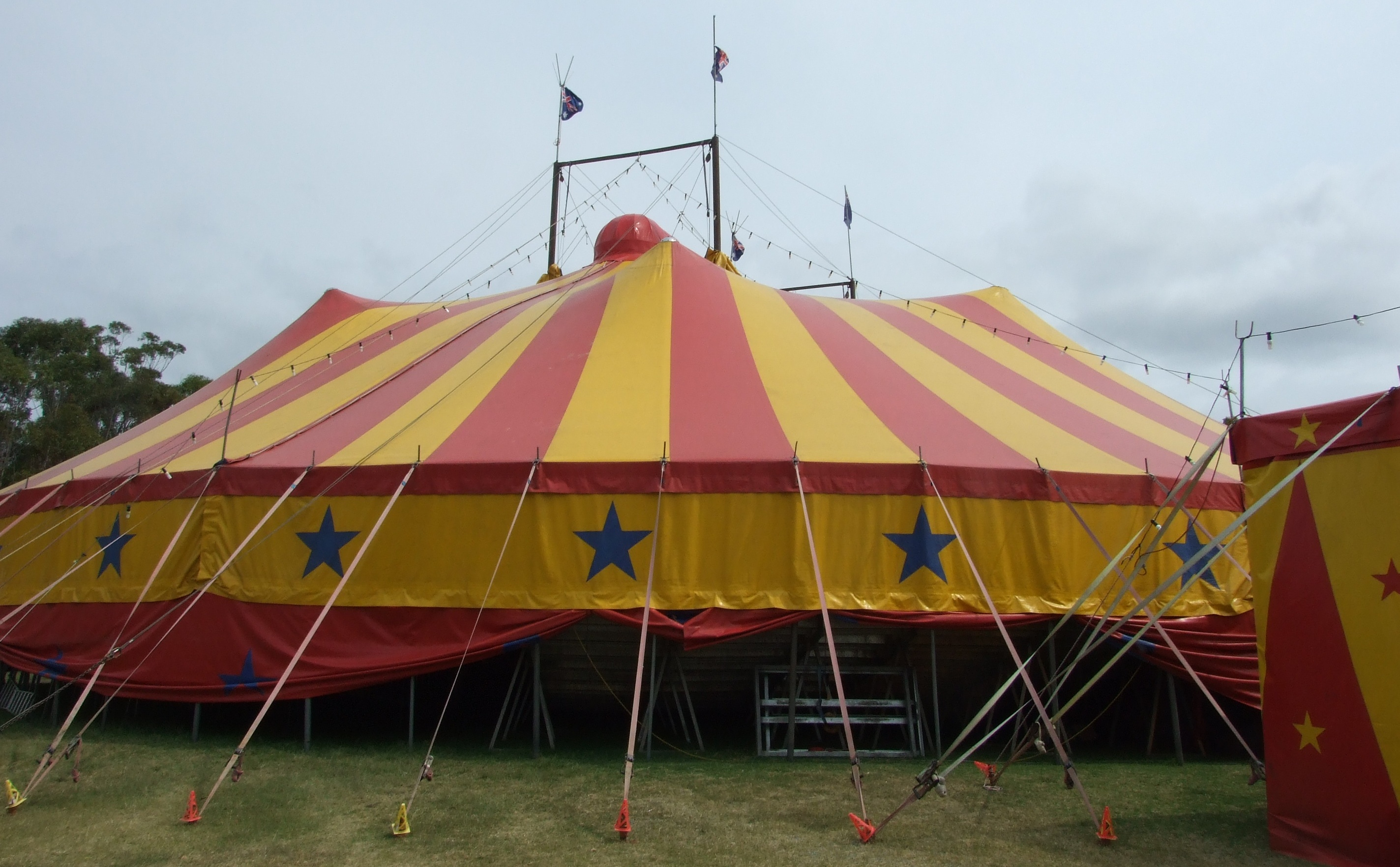

Origin
- Country: Australia
- Founder(s): Lennon and West families
- Year founded: 1993

Information
- Travelling show?: Yes
- Type of acts: Trapeze, acrobats, teeter board, flying trapeze, aerial silks, cloud swing, clowns, horse, ponies, pigs, goats, dogs
- Website: https://www.stardustcircus.com.au

Stardust Circus is a circus that tours in Australia. Its annual performance season lasts from January to late November, touring Australia from the remotest towns to the largest cities.

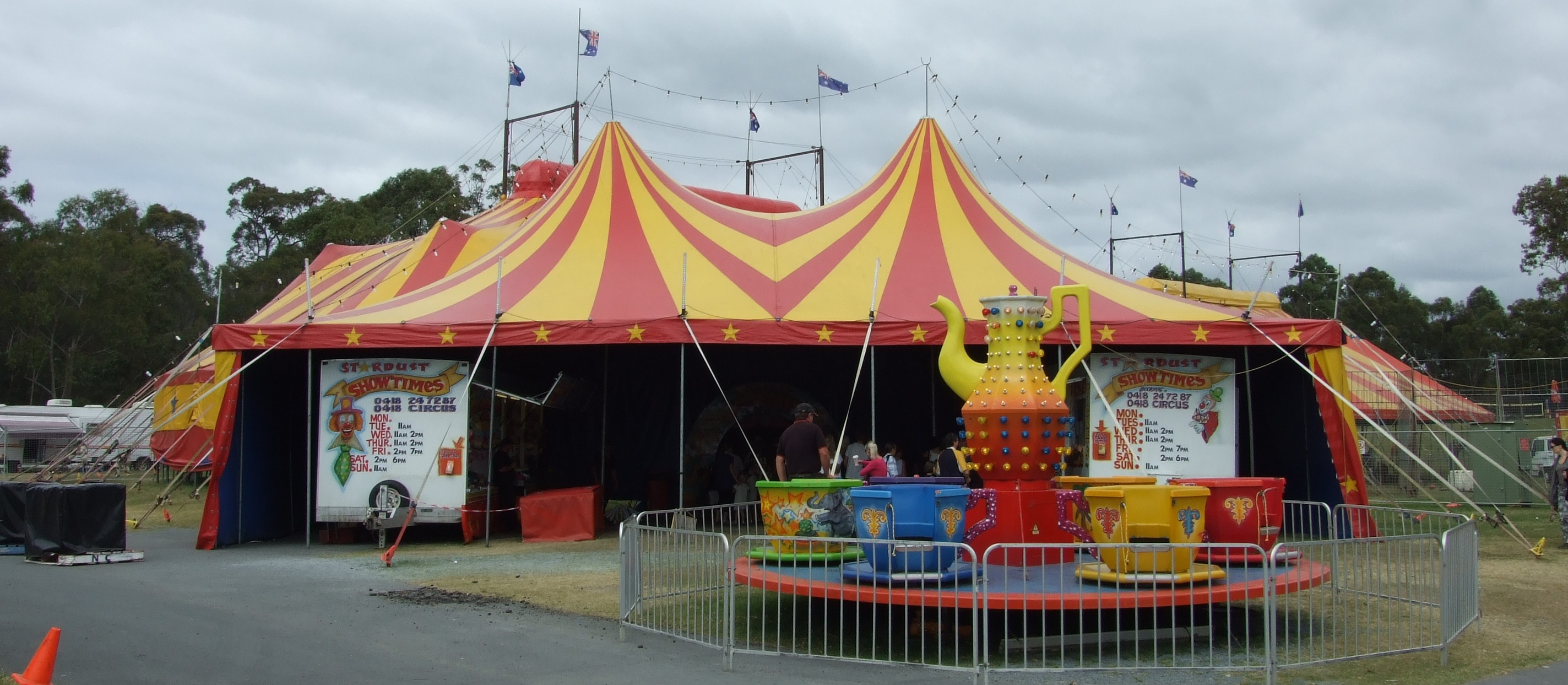
Stardust Circus

The circus was established in 1993 by the Lennon and West families, two circus families with tradition going back to the late 19th century. It is a traditional form of circus and was the last circus in Australia with big cats in their programme.

Stardust Circus showcases a wide variety of circus arts such as tumblers, solo trapeze, acrobats, teeter board, aerial silks, cloud swing, flying trapeze and clowns. Animals include liberty horses (performing dressage without rider and on signals alone), liberty Welsh mountain ponies, goats, pigs and dogs.

In 2021, the circus retired its four tigers, which were its last remaining exotic animals, citing insurance difficulties following the pandemic. The circus had previously retired its two elephants and monkeys.

Janice Lennon's daughter Natalie married Rudy Weber and they run Webers Circus.

== See also ==
- List of circuses and circus owners
