= Eroni's Circus =

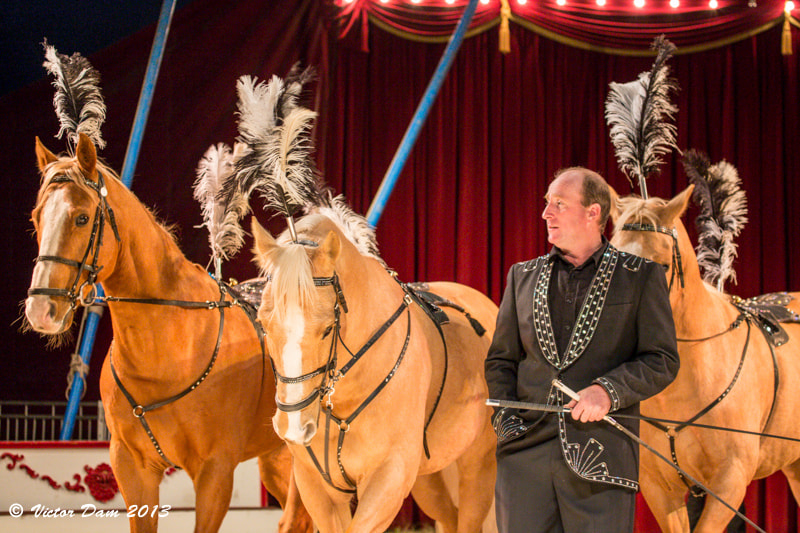
- Eroni's touring in 2013

Origin
- Country: Australia
- Founder(s): Tony Maynard, Cathy Maynard
- Year founded: 2007

Information
- Travelling show?: Yes
- Circus tent?: Yes - Red and White
Type of acts
- horses
- ponies
- trick roping
- dogs
- hula-hoop
- aerial acts
- trapeze
- juggling
- clowns

Eroni's Circus is a traditional travelling Australian circus, founded in 2007 and owned by Tony and Cathy Maynard. Acts include performing with horses, trick roping, performing dogs, hula hoops, trapeze, and other aerial acts, such as acrobats and juggling. Eroni's Circus performs in a 32-metre, red-and-white Big Top marquee.

The circus often performs at agricultural shows and corporate functions.

== Former Eroni Brothers Circus: 1st incarnation ==
The current incarnation of Eroni's is not to be confused with another circus that was operated by distant relatives of the current proprietors from 1889 until the early 20th century, and also went by the name of Eroni Brothers Circus.

The first Eroni's Circus toured Australia from the late 1800s until the 1920s, run by Tony Maynard's great-great-grandfather William Perry, having split off from a larger circus called the Perry Bros, the first circus to circumnavigate Australia.

== See also ==
- List of circuses and circus owners
