= Venardos Circus =

Traveling circus company

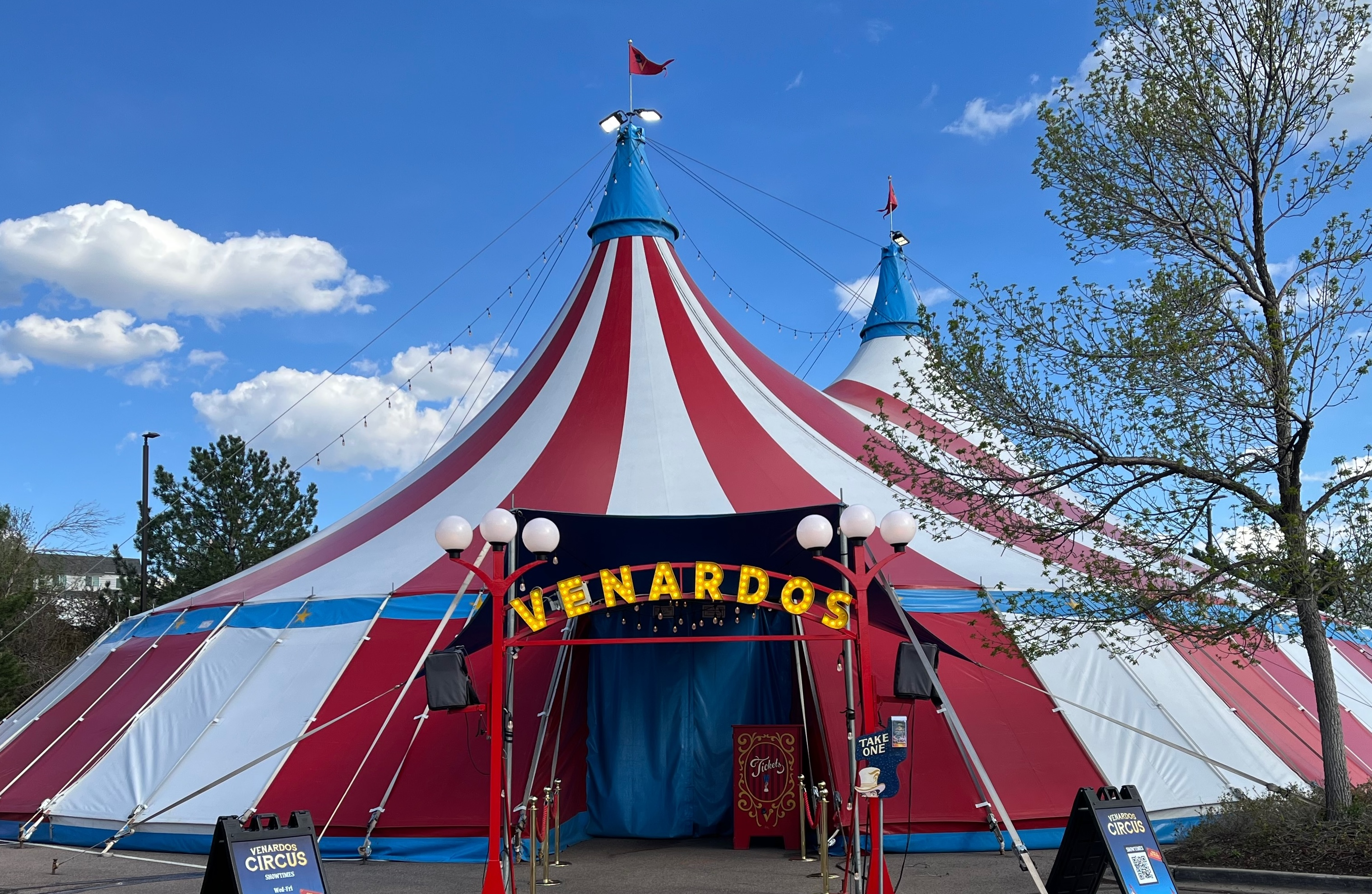
- Venardos Circus 2025

Origin
- Country: United States
- Founder(s): Kevin Venardos
- Year founded: 2014 (12 years ago)

Information
- Operator(s): Kevin Venardos
- Traveling show?: Yes
- Circus tent?: Yes
- Type of acts: Yes
- Website: www.venardoscircus.com

The Venardos Circus is a family-friendly, animal-free, American traveling circus company. It has run shows since 2014.

== History ==
The circus was founded by Kevin Venardos, son of Lane Venardos, in 2014. Prior to that, he attended Ithaca college studying musical theater. At age 22 he was asked to join the Ringling Bros. and Barnum & Bailey Circus, becoming the youngest ringmaster in its history. After five years he left to create his own.

The acts and circus skills have included, among others, Broadway-style productions, acrobatics, aerialists, jugglers clowns, comedy, and hand-balancing. The Venardos Circus Mantra is "Live Your Circus Dream", encouraging everyone to shoot for the stars.
