= Circus Waldissima =

American youth circus company

- Circus Waldissima Logo as of 2018

Origin
- Country: United States
- Founder(s): Don Basmajian; Sieglinde Basmajian
- Year founded: 1992; 33 years ago

Information
- Operator(s): Summerfield Waldorf School
- Traveling show?: No
- Circus tent?: yes
- Winter quarters: Santa Rosa,_California, U.S.
- Website: www.circuswaldissima.com

Circus Waldissima (founded 1992) is a theatrical youth circus company operated out of Santa Rosa, California, as an after-school program at Summerfield Waldorf School and farm. Founded as a small after-school program with a few children, and a performance at a school function, the circus has since grown to more than three large shows a year with over 100 student participants in the main show, in its own circus tent.

== History ==
First classes and first show at the 1992 May Faire celebrations at Summerfield Waldorf School. In 2010, Circus Waldissima Purchased their first 22m diameter Circus Tent from Segel RAAP in Germany. First Show in the New Big Top ("Life of a Butterfly") was in 2011.

== Shows ==
=== 2011 ===
Spring

- Life of a Butterfly
- Birthday Wishes

=== 2012 ===
Winter

- Winter Show

=== 2013 ===
Winter

- The Night Before Christmas

Spring

- Fire and Ice
- CandyLand

=== 2014 ===
Spring

- Boomtown Buccaneers
- Once Upon a Time

=== 2015 ===
Spring

- The Bridge
- Cirque Du Fillet! A circus under the sea

=== 2016 ===
Spring

- Ethos
- Charlie and the Chocolate Factory

=== 2017 ===
Spring

- Alchemy
- The Wizard of Oz

=== 2018 ===
Winter

- Hanukah Theme

Spring

- Under The Big Top
- The Jungle Book

== In The News ==
=== 2017 ===
The Press Democrat

- picture gallery in the newspaper and online

Bohemian

- Writers Pick 'Best Way to Dangle Your Kids from a Rope'

=== 2016 ===
The Press Democrat

- Circus Waldissima rehearsal
- Circus Waldissima open Big top show

Sonoma County Gazette

- News

=== 2015 ===
The Press Democrat

- Theatrics aplenty at Summerfield Waldorf
- Circus Waldissima
- Ten Days of Fun

=== 2014 ===
The Press Democrat

- Circus Waldissima
- The Big top come ‘from’ Town

Sonoma County Gazette

- In the News
