= Dnipro State Circus =

Circus in Dnipro, Ukraine

- Дніпровський державний цирк
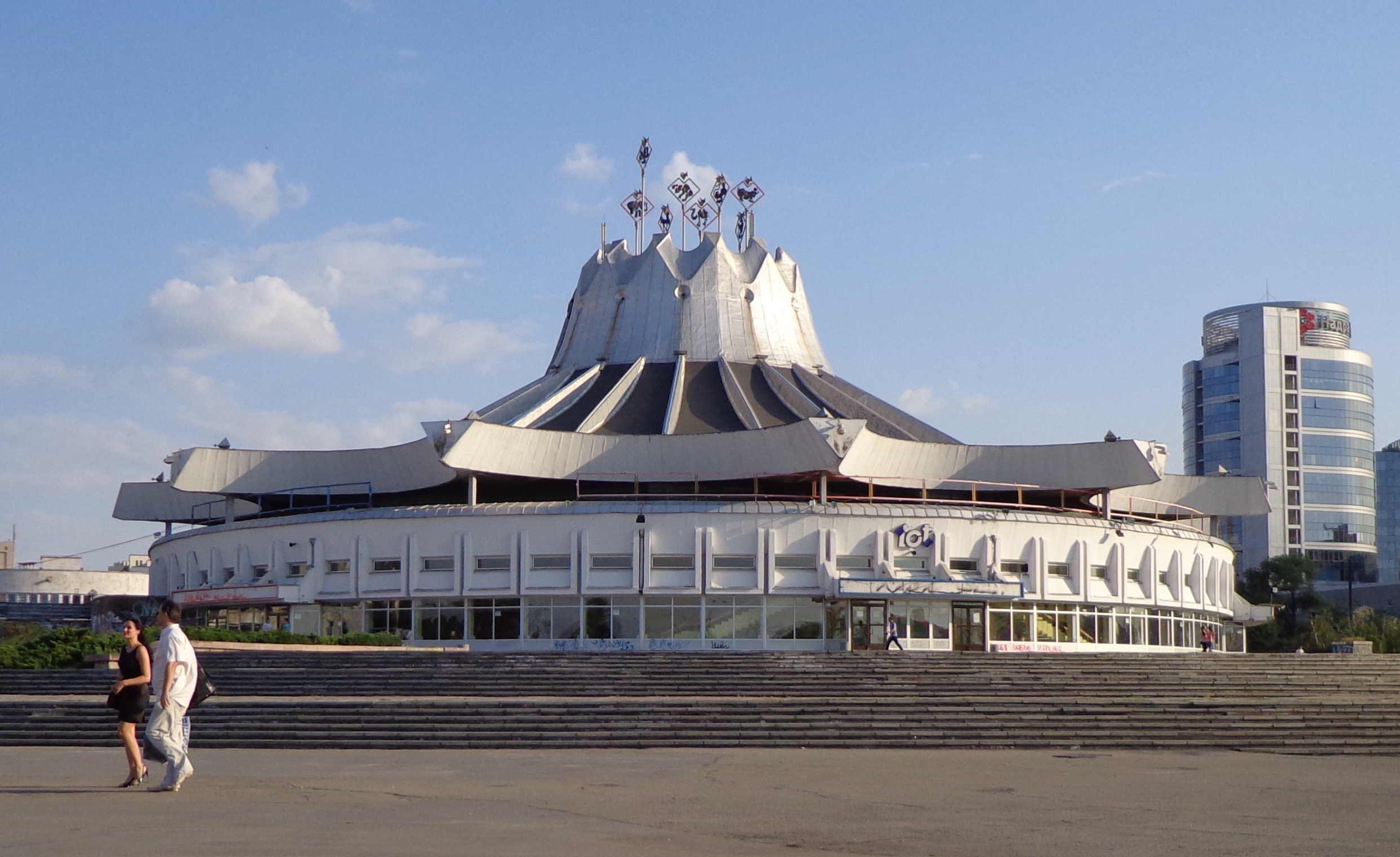
- The circus in 2013
- Interactive map of Dnipro State Circus
- Address: Sicheslavska Naberezhna Street; Dnipro; Ukraine
- Location: Dnipro, Dnipropetrovsk Oblast, Ukraine
- Coordinates: 48.4682645°N 35.0539455°E
- Capacity: 1914
- Type: circus

Construction
- Opened: 24 December 1980
- Architect: Pavlo Nirinberg

Website
- circus.dp.ua

The Dnipro State Circus (Ukrainian: Дніпровський державний цирк, romanized: Dniprovs'kyi derzhavnyi tsyrk) is a 20th-century circus in the city of Dnipro, Ukraine. The venue hosted activities for the New Year, animal-filled circus acts, clown performances, and other forms of entertainment. It is the only circus in the country with a rehearsal and a staged arena.

== Design ==
The building's original dome arch pattern, which produces acoustic and readily attaches equipment for artists to suspend, is what sets it apart. The circus was built using a tent covering made up of 12 prefabricated petals of reinforced concrete pieces, a first for a domestic building. The most up-to-date lighting and audio equipment is installed in the hall. The only circus in Ukraine that has a rehearsal and production venue is Dnipro State Circus. The auditorium can accommodate 1914 people.

The 92 kilometres (57 mi) metal rail improved the auditorium's acoustics and allowed performers to easily attach their equipment. There is a single installed original cross-grate with many winches positioned at different angles. The circus dome's highest point is 19 metres (62 ft) above the ground. Electrical workers installed 97 kilometres of wires in various areas all around the structure.

Right on the Dnieper's riverbank, adjacent to the circus structure, the White Swan light and music fountain draws attention. The fountain appears to be flapping wings as it revolves, owing to the advancements in laser technology. The core jet reaches a height of 50 metres (160 ft).

== History ==
Mobile circuses with deterrent tents, or open air, were a popular form of entertainment for locals in Katerynoslav throughout the 1800s. However, a permanent circus structure was constructed in Kachelnaya Square in 1885. It persisted until 1929. However, the circus and the ancient mansion were eventually relocated to Ozerna Square. The circus once more attracted the public to performances in February 1911. Back then, Gigetto Truzzi, Vladimir Durov, and the court Japanese circus Mikado made a successful tour in this area.

This circus operated out of a home that Gigetto Truzzi constructed and remained until 1929. A circus-chapito that was destroyed during World War II had been operational since 1932. The circus was evacuated during the World War II and the Nazi occupation from 1941 to 1943. The Theater of Illusions was the moniker given to the last few artists. All were deported to Germany in 1943, and it is unknown what became of them after that.

The Ozerna Square circus premises were reconstructed following the war. However, it presented its final show on 13 September 1959, and a new circus structure was constructed in June 1960 in accordance with the design of V.A. Zhukova, an architect from Kyiv. However, the lack of heating in the space meant that performances could only take place there during the warm season, which made the plan less successful.

In 1980, it relocated to a house designed in accordance with Pavlo Nirinberg's proposal, on the embankment in the city center. The circus building's grand opening was held on 24 December 1980. In the inaugural Carnival Goes Around The World Event at the new circus, artists welcomed the circus's construction workers.

Shabatko V. I. was the circus's general director and artistic director since 2010. Circus artists such as Yuri Kuklachov, Igor Kio, Yuri Nikulin and many others performed at the circus. It is a spot to unwind with the whole family. The circus's entertainment schedule is always changing. The circus hosted performances till 6 August 2022.

== Gallery ==
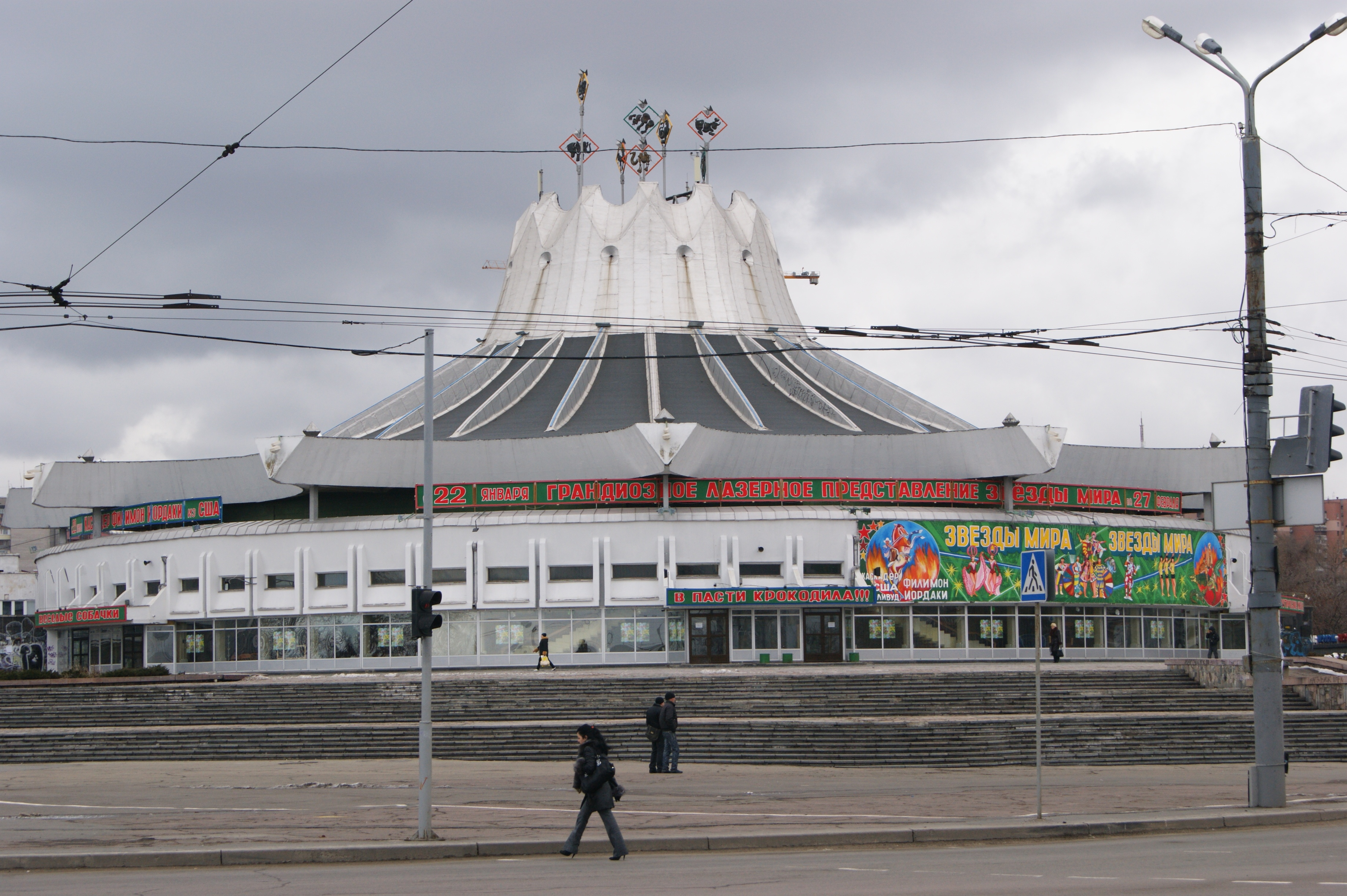
The circus in 2011

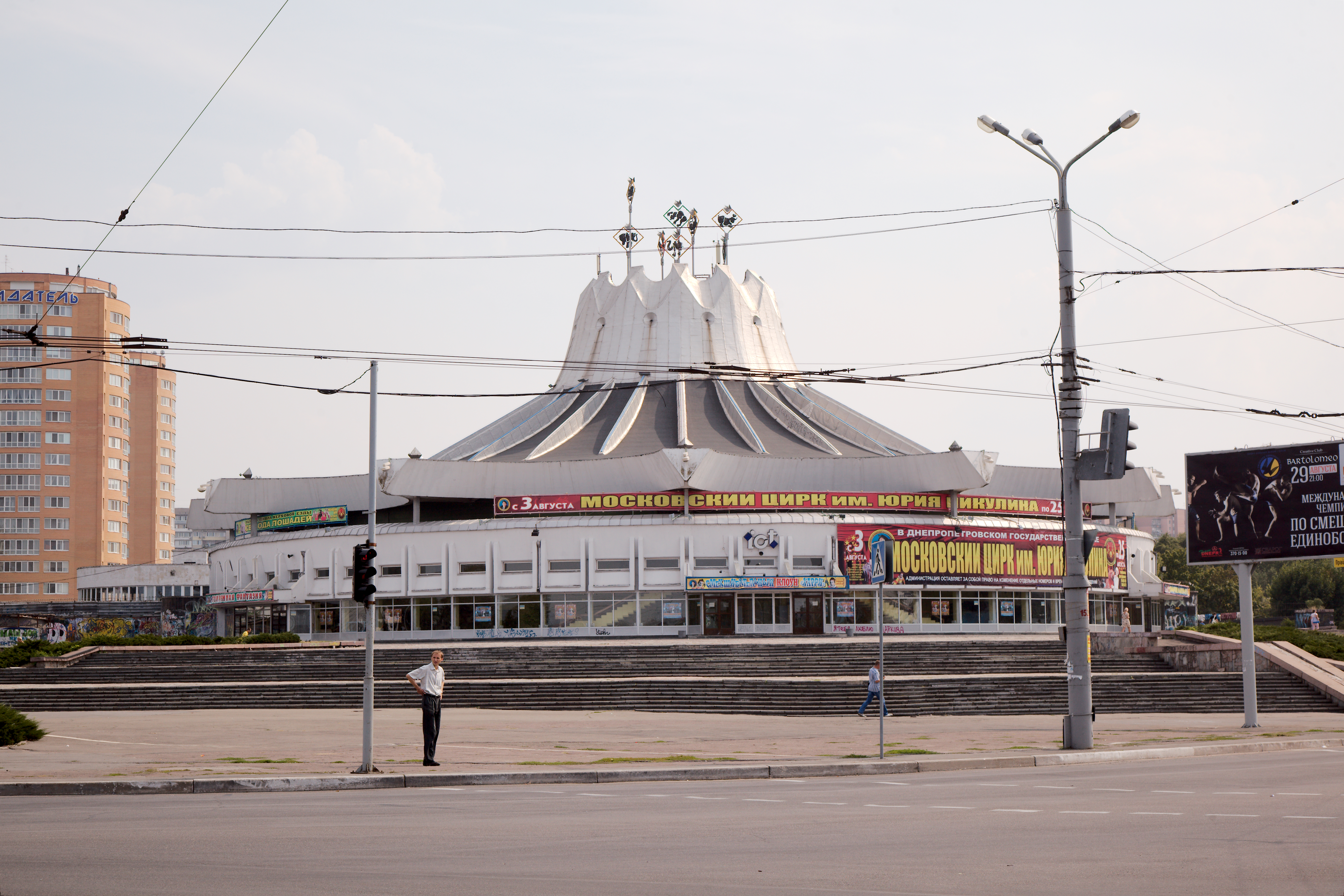
The circus in 2013

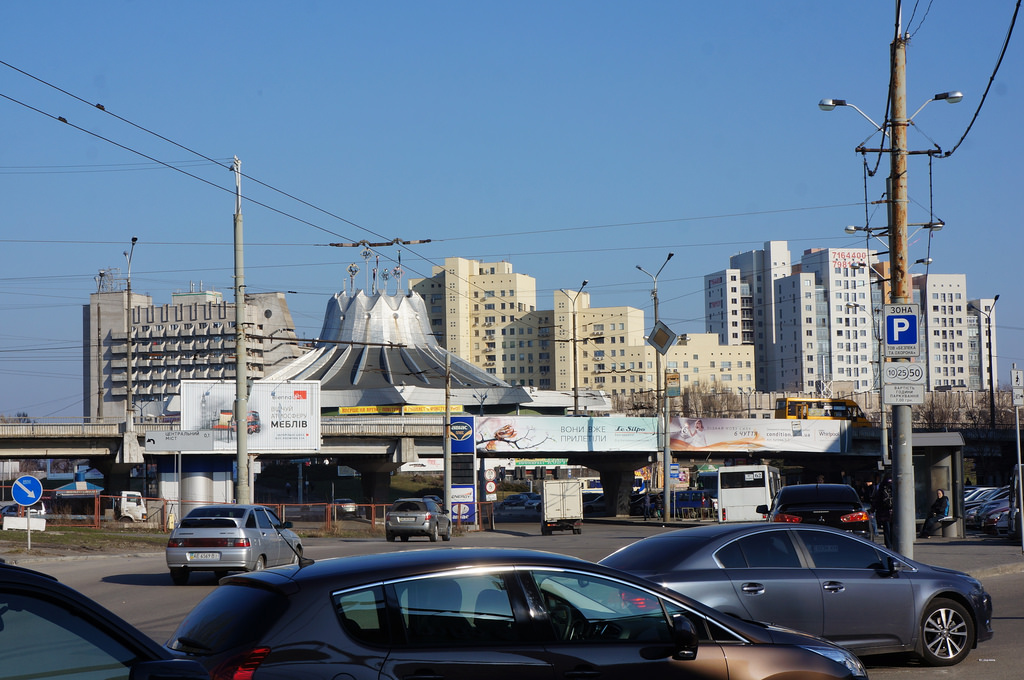
The circus in 2015
