= Baku State Circus =

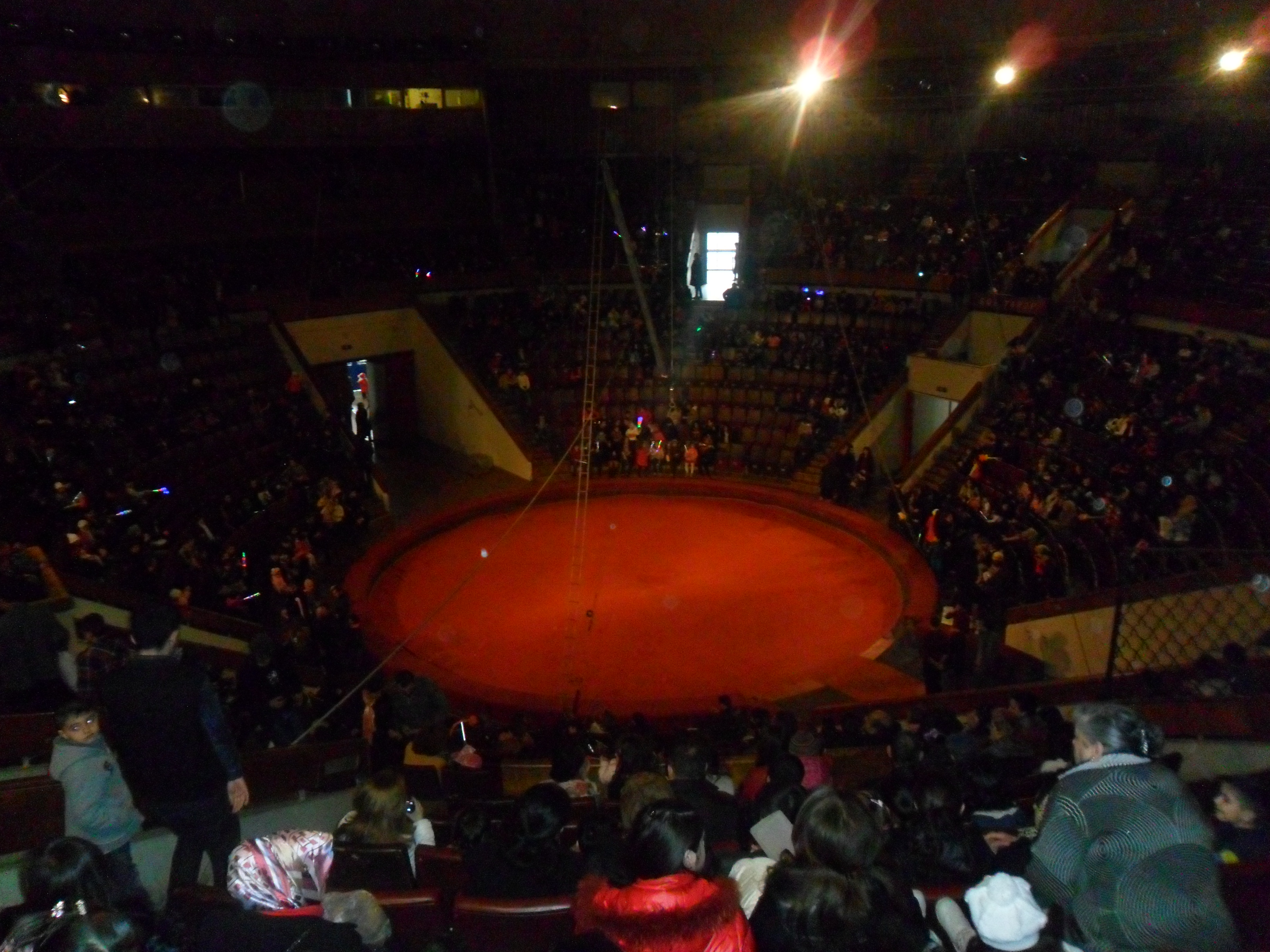
- Interactive map of the Baku State Circus area

General information
- Location: Baku, Azerbaijan
- Coordinates: 40.3830°N 49.8396°E
- Construction started: 1945

Baku State Circus (Azerbaijani: Bakı Dövlət Sirki) is the main arena circus of Baku, capital of Azerbaijan.

== History ==
In the 1890s, Nikitin's brothers opened a first circus-zoo in Baku. In 1904, they built the first Circus-building in the East on the intersection of Nizami street and Bul-Bul Avenue - in the place of the present Nasimi garden. But it burned in 1906. In 1916, Yefimovs built another circus building in the place of the destroyed circus-building of Nikitin's brothers. It burned again in December 1924, and after a while Kudryavtsev set up his own circus here.

In the 1930s, branch of the Baku Circus was founded. Members of this branch were Pahlevanis of village and people walking on a tight rope. In 1945, a collective of Azerbaijani circus was organized in the Azerbaijan SSR, it included estrade actors, who performed tricks in the circus and amateur participants with artistic skills. The composer Uzeyir Hajibeyov prepared the first program of the collective named "Wedding of Azerbaijan". This program was shown during 1946 - 1951, firstly in Baku, then in Moscow and other cities of the former USSR. Ancient custom and traditions of Azerbaijan, national wedding traditions, national dances and circus numbers were performed at scene during this program. Famous Azerbaijani composers, poets, ballet masters and artists worked along with the collective of the circus. Starting from 1946, troupe of Baku Circus had regular tours in cities of the USSR, the collective performed programs “We are from Baku” and “Dawn over the Rock”. Besides the USSR they had tours in Southern Europe, Asia, Africa and the United States.

In the early 1950s, the artistic director of the team, Mikail Jabrayilov, added examples from the poems of Samed Vurgun to the content of the program.

In 1959, the circus team demonstrated "We are from Baku" program in the 2nd Azerbaijan Literature and Art Decade in Moscow. In 1966, the members of the Azerbaijani Circus team changed completely and on April 15 of the same year, the team demonstrated a circus performance on the scene of the Baku Circus, entitled "Qayada nişanə" (Sign on the rock).

In 1967, a new building of Baku Circus equipped with necessary equipment for full operation of the circus was built according to architects E. Ismayilov and F. Leontyev's project. There are 2000 seats in the new building. The Circus teams of neighboring countries came in Baku in order to perform in the new arena.

After the collapse of the USSR, ties between the former republics was broken and economic difficulties was created, thus the Baku Circus in the 1990s, almost stopped its activity.
