= Circus Juventas =

American circus arts school

Coordinates: 44°54′40″N 93°9′14″W

- Circus Juventas's logo
- Formation: October 1994 (32 years ago)
- Founders: Betty Butler; Dan Butler
- Type: Nonprofit corporation
- Location: 1270 Montreal Ave, Saint Paul, MN 55116
- Region served: Minneapolis–Saint Paul
- Services: Circus arts
- Website: circusjuventas.org
- Formerly called: Circus of the Star

Circus Juventas (formerly Circus of the Star) is a youth performing arts circus school located in Saint Paul, Minnesota, serving youth throughout the Minneapolis–Saint Paul metropolitan area. The organization was founded in 1994 by Dan and Betty Butler, and offers circus arts training to young people ranging from 3 to 21 years old.

Emulating the style of Cirque du Soleil, Circus Juventas's first show was at Saint Paul's Highland Fest in 1995. From there, the school's enrollment quickly expanded and the organization initiated a campaign to fund a $2.1 million permanent big top facility, which opened in 2001 on Saint Paul parkland in the Highland Park neighborhood. That year, it began to produce annual summer performances showcasing the work of its most advanced students, each with a distinct theme. Yearly themed December holiday shows were added starting in 2020 after that year's summer show was postponed due to the COVID-19 pandemic.

These shows have proven popular with local audiences and have been well received critically, with reviewers praising the professionalism and fearlessness exhibited in the productions, while noting students' occasional missteps during performances. Circus Juventas students have performed and competed both around the Minneapolis–Saint Paul area and abroad. As of 2014, Juventas was the largest youth performing arts circus in North America. The school had tentative plans to add a second facility elsewhere in the region.

== History ==
The founders of Circus Juventas, Dan and Betty Butler, met as teenagers at the Sailor Circus of Sarasota during the mid-1970s. Dan was a catcher on the flying trapeze, and Betty was an aerialist on the cloud swing. They began dating at age sixteen, went on to perform at Florida State University's Flying High Circus, and married in 1980. Dan became a successful real estate broker in Atlanta, but faced bankruptcy and chemical dependency. The couple came to reside in Minnesota because Dan Butler was receiving alcohol and drug abuse rehabilitation at Hazelden. The Butlers attended Sailor Circus reunions together and after one, in April 1994, Betty Butler wondered, "Wouldn't it be great if we could do something in Minnesota?"

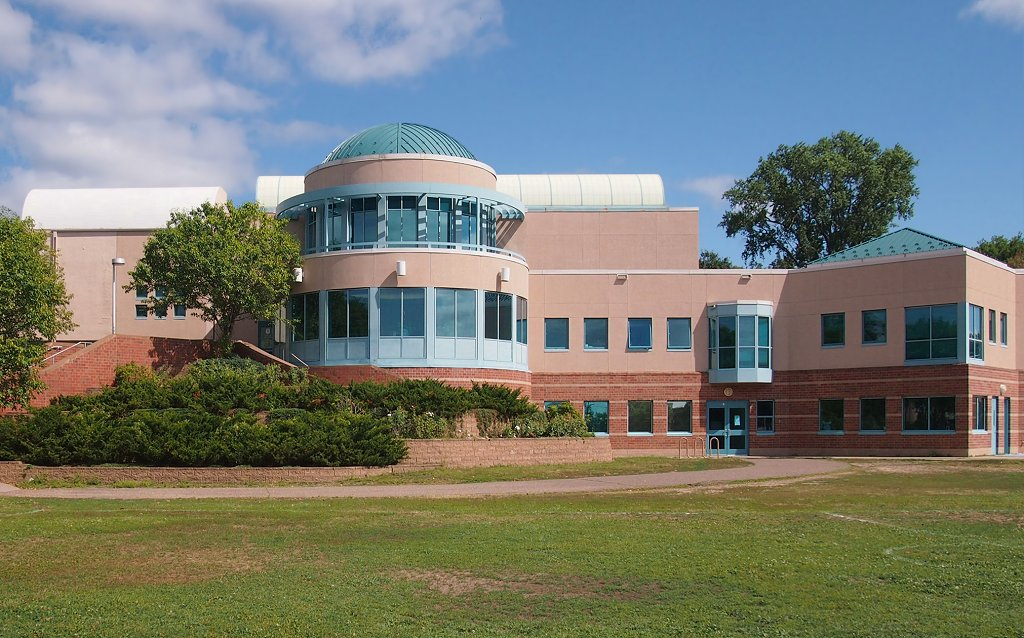
Hillcrest Recreation Center, the original home of Circus Juventas (then Circus of the Star)

The Butlers founded Circus Juventas as a nonprofit corporation in October 1994, citing a desire to give back to the community as one of the reasons for its creation. It was originally known as Circus of the Star, so called for Minnesota's nickname, The North Star State. The newly opened Hillcrest Recreation Center in Saint Paul provided the couple with inspiration for the circus program, and they asked the city if they could hold classes there. The Saint Paul Parks and Recreation Department approved the program, and assumed liability for approximately fifty children who enrolled the first year. About thirty of those students stayed with the program and performed in their first show at the 1995 Highland Fest, an annual family-oriented neighborhood festival. After this performance, interest in the program increased. By 1996, 30 more students were enrolled, and by 1997, an additional 25 had joined the program. The circus was still based out of the Hillcrest Recreation Center's gym, and had to work around the schedule of the other regular activities in the facility. In 1997, the waitlist for the program was around 200 students.

With the school's growing popularity, the Butlers saw the need for a larger space so they developed plans to build a 1,500-seat facility. In an article published in the St. Paul Pioneer Press in 1997, the estimated cost of the project was quoted at $700,000, with a groundbreaking planned for April 1998. The Butlers initiated their capital campaign on February 18, 1998, with the goal of raising $1.1 million for their new building. By August 1999, they had raised $1 million of their expanded $1.6 million goal for the circus expansion, with plans to break ground on the new facility that November. Part of the funding came from Saint Paul's Sales Tax Revitalization (STAR) program, through which surplus funds were distributed by councilmembers to worthy organizations. A total of $627,183 was disbursed for the circus through the program, split between three STAR components: $450,000 as part of Neighborhood STAR which sought to fund local initiatives, $122,183 as part of Cultural STAR which funded arts and culture programs, and $55,000 from 3rd Ward City Councilmember Pat Harris's discretionary Neighborhood Investment Initiative budget. Another $60,000 came from an anonymous recently retired Saint Paul businessperson.

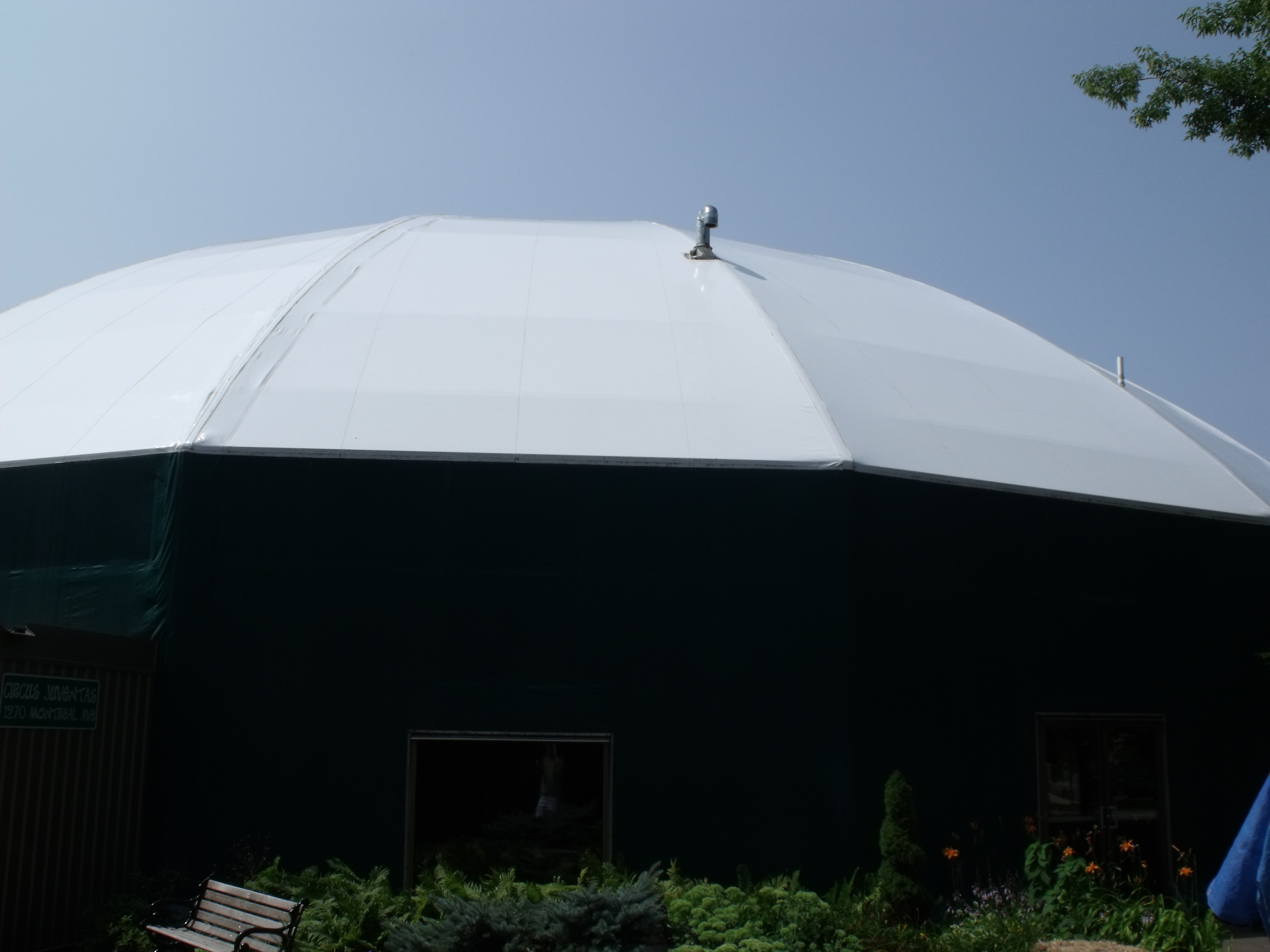
The permanent big top, exterior

The $1.6 million were raised in full by the end of April 2000, just in time to ensure the circus received its STAR funding which would have been nullified if the Butlers had not made their fundraising goal by May 5 of that year. The Butlers had found the space for the school through coincidence; after driving along Montreal Avenue in Saint Paul one night, they turned into a parking lot, noticed an area beneath some trees, and realized it was an ideal location for their school's expanded facility. On August 25, 2000, ground was broken on the new structure. The big top took about a year to complete, during which time the school also changed its name to Circus Juventas, named for Juventas, an ancient Roman goddess of youth and rejuvenation. Ultimately, the project totaled $2.1 million and by 2006, the school was $700,000 in debt. It was working with various city agencies to resolve the shortfall and faced "no looming threat." The school relies heavily on parent volunteers to help with various operational aspects, from rigging to administrative work to set construction and decoration, and concessions sales. Betty Butler estimated that 90 percent of work on the school's shows is done by parent volunteers. The circus operates with the equivalent of 40 full-time employees.

In 2010, the circus school enrolled students from ages 6 to 21, with an additional enrollment of about 150 toddlers and other younger participants as young as three years old. By 2013, the enrollment had reached over 800 and the school's annual operating budget exceeded $2 million. Circus Juventas has also held circus arts fitness classes for adults, taught by the school's regular instructors. The school is a member of the Outdoor Amusement Business Association and the Fédération Mondiale du Cirque. A listing on the latter organization's website notes that as of 2014, Juventas is the largest performing arts circus school for youth in the United States; other sources indicate that it is the largest in all of North America.

== Facilities ==
Circus Juventas's big top is located in the Highland Park neighborhood of Saint Paul, Minnesota. It stands 40 feet (12 m) tall and encompasses 21,000 square feet (1,951 m^{2}) of floor space built on concrete slab. The structure is supported by an aluminum frame and covered with flame-resistant vinyl-coated cloth. The building's 1,000-square-foot (93 m^{2}) lobby space was designed by Locus Architecture, Ltd., of Minneapolis. The firm connected texteline fabric (often used for awnings) to the system of catwalks and supports to help "the lobby act...as an immersion tank, rather than a threshold, to introduce spectators to the illusion of the world of circus." Although Locus was still installing the fabric within hours of the circus's gala opening, the company won one of the 10 honor awards distributed in 2002 by the Minnesota branch of the American Institute of Architects for their design. The circus school's original bleachers could seat 1,200 audience members.

=== Bleacher collapse ===
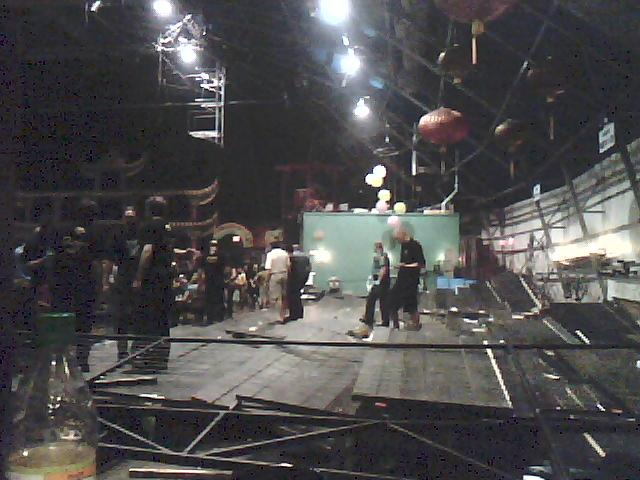
The bleachers shortly after the collapse

On August 16, 2009, at the closing performance of the show Yulong, a set of bleachers with a carrying capacity of 450 people and holding 420 at the time collapsed, sending seven people to the hospital. In the ensuing investigation, it came to light that Juventas had not had the bleachers inspected each time they were set up, as required by their lease with the city. They had been issued a permit in 2006 for the bleachers, and had not had them inspected since. The school was fined $500 and shut down until the legal and safety issues could be fully investigated. It reopened about a month later and installed new bleachers with molded plastic seats the next March.

=== Future ===
In early 2014, the Butlers announced plans to expand their big top facility by an additional 10,000 square feet (930 m^{2}). The additional space would house a dance and theater studio, a costume shop, offices, and a 4,500-square-foot (420 m^{2}) gym. Naming rights for the new structure would provide a component of the $4 million the school hoped to raise for the $2 million expansion, a $1 million addition to the circus's endowment, and eventual repairs to the building's exterior, estimated at $1 million. Betty Butler stated that the project stemmed from the desire to create "a true professional program, a separate program" for students looking to study and perform circus arts post-Juventas, even though she and her husband originally shied away from pre-professional training as a core aspect of their circus school.

According to Saint Paul's Parks and Recreation Department, the cliffside space which the expansion would occupy was deemed unsuitable for building a structure of the expansion's proposed size. In response, the Butlers were considering building a new facility of up to 50,000 square feet (4,600 m^{2}) in the western suburbs of Minneapolis–Saint Paul. Construction of a new building would likely cost $10 million, require a capital campaign to fund, and probably not begin for five to 10 years. In the meantime, the school is performing a small expansion to its Highland Park space, on which the Circus has a lease for at least 17 more years, as of 2014.

== Performances ==
The school typically puts on three shows each year: a spring performance featuring less advanced students studying circus arts at beginning and intermediate levels, a late-summer show to display the talents of more advanced students, and a December holiday show. While the earliest shows were focused primarily on technique and the individual acts, by 1997 or 1998 the school began to emphasize the artistic side of performances, including integrating those acts into Cirque du Soleil-style narratives. Holiday shows were introduced beginning in 2020 after the planned summer show that year was cancelled on account of the COVID-19 pandemic. The school also hosts an annual gala in late autumn that includes portions of the year's earlier summer performance. Circus Juventas does not utilize animal acts in its shows.

=== Big top summer shows ===
- 2001: Mythos, a production dealing with Greek mythology was performed not only in Circus Juventas's newly opened permanent big top facility but also at the Minnesota State Capitol on New Year's Eve, 2001.
- 2002: Cirque Napoleon, a show that delved into the history of circus, taking place in a French circus in 1859 and honoring Jules Léotard, an early trapeze artist.
- 2003: Taroq, a production set in Morocco following four traveling nomads on a quest to determine the meaning of life.
- 2004: Swash, a pirate-themed performance that entailed a quest for lost treasure.
- 2005: Dyrnwych, a production that included "an amalgam of fairy-tale types, with wicked hag witches, trolls, forest spirits, and warrior women."
- 2006: Pazzanni, a retelling of the story of Cinderella, inspired by 1500s Venetian carnivals and featuring masks designed by the mask maker responsible for those used in the 1999 film Eyes Wide Shut.
- 2007: Atlanticus, a performance set under the oceans in the domain of Poseidon.
- 2008: RavensManor, a haunted house-themed show, based loosely on the Haunted Mansion ride located in Disneyland. RavensManor's story, set in New Orleans, included a tragic romance and zombies.
- 2009: Yulong: The Jade Dragon (sometimes shortened to Yulong), a presentation derived from Chinese legendary and circus traditions. Produced in collaboration with the Chinese American Association of Minnesota, the show spotlighted three Taiwanese guest artists and included an emphasis on Chinese circus acts such as Chinese pole and hoop diving.
- 2010: Sawdust, a performance evoking the traditions of historic American circuses. Special guests in the show were veteran circus performers Willie Edleston and Tony Steele who played slightly fictionalized versions of themselves.
- 2011: Grimm—Happily Ever After! (sometimes shortened to Grimm), a show retelling a number of the Brothers Grimm's fairy tales. Characters included Rapunzel, Cinderella, Little Red Riding Hood, Hansel and Gretel, Snow White, and the Frog Prince.
- 2012: Showdown, a Wild West-themed show set in the fictional town of Tumbleweed. The performance included portrayals of historical figures including Lillie Langtry, Black Bart, Billy the Kid, and Wyatt Earp, and featured a seven-man highwire pyramid, becoming the second youth circus to complete this trick.
- 2013: Oz, based on The Wonderful Wizard of Oz. The performance retold Dorothy Gale's travels through the Land of Oz and incorporated a "maison" trapeze, a cubic apparatus replicating Dorothy's house that gets swept away and carried to Oz by a tornado.
- 2014: Neverland, incorporating elements from the world of Peter Pan and featuring a cradle act.
- 2015: 1001 Nights, a retelling of Scheherazade's One Thousand and One Nights.
- 2016: Wonderland, an adaptation of Alice's Adventures in Wonderland.
- 2017: Nordrsaga, a hero's journey based on Norse mythology in which a young librarian teams up with Thor to help recover Mjölnir from Loki.
- 2018: Steam, a steampunk time travel tale inspired by H. G. Wells's The War of the Worlds and Jules Verne's Twenty Thousand Leagues Under the Seas.
- 2019: Twisted, a retelling in which several fairy tale characters rewrite their own stories.
- 2020: None, cancelled due to the COVID-19 pandemic.
- 2021: Galaxium, a performance set on the fictional planet of the same name in which an industrialist attempts to determine what became of her great-great-grandparents' lost mission a century before.
- 2022: Confetti, a show commemorating pivotal moments in the history of the circus arts.
- 2023: Excalibur, which retells Arthurian legend.
- 2024: Jangala, a jungle adventure inspired by Tarzan of the Apes, The Jungle Book, and The Swiss Family Robinson.
- 2025: Lumière, a tale of five children traveling from 1985 to the era of classical Hollywood cinema, then returning through a Twilight Zone-inspired world to their own time.
- 2026: Whimsy, an adaptation of Charlie and the Chocolate Factory, expanding upon the story and introducing new characters.

=== Big top holiday shows ===
- 2020: A Hygge Holiday, narrated by Kevin Kling.
- 2021: Blizzard!, a performance about three elves at the North Pole who cause trouble.
- 2022: Solstice, a show about woodland characters attempting to save the winter by saving Jack Frost.
- 2023: A Hygge Holiday, a remount of the 2020 show.
- 2024: Blizzard!, a remount of the 2021 show.
- 2025: Solstice, a remount of the 2022 show.
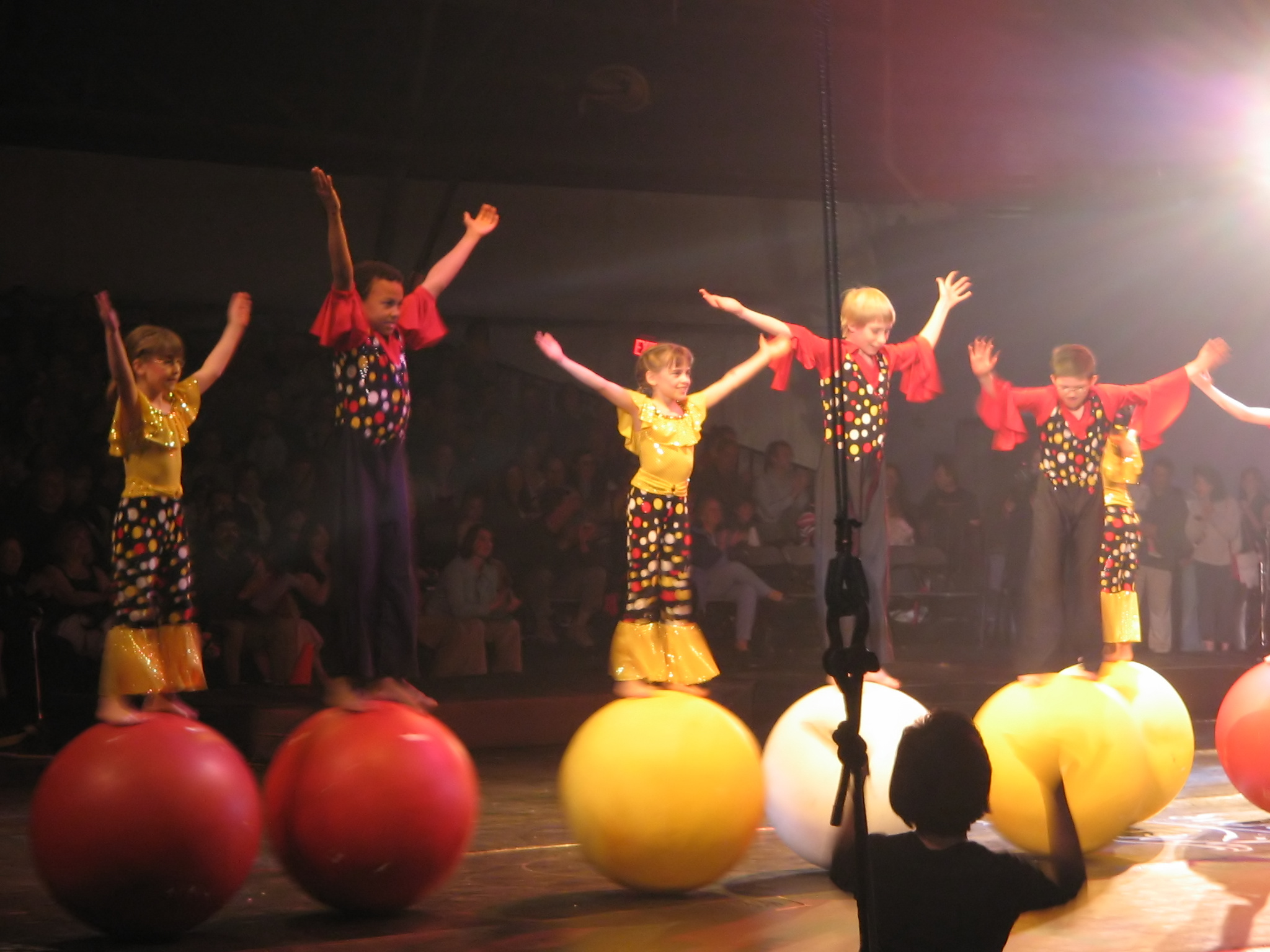
Performers balancing atop globes

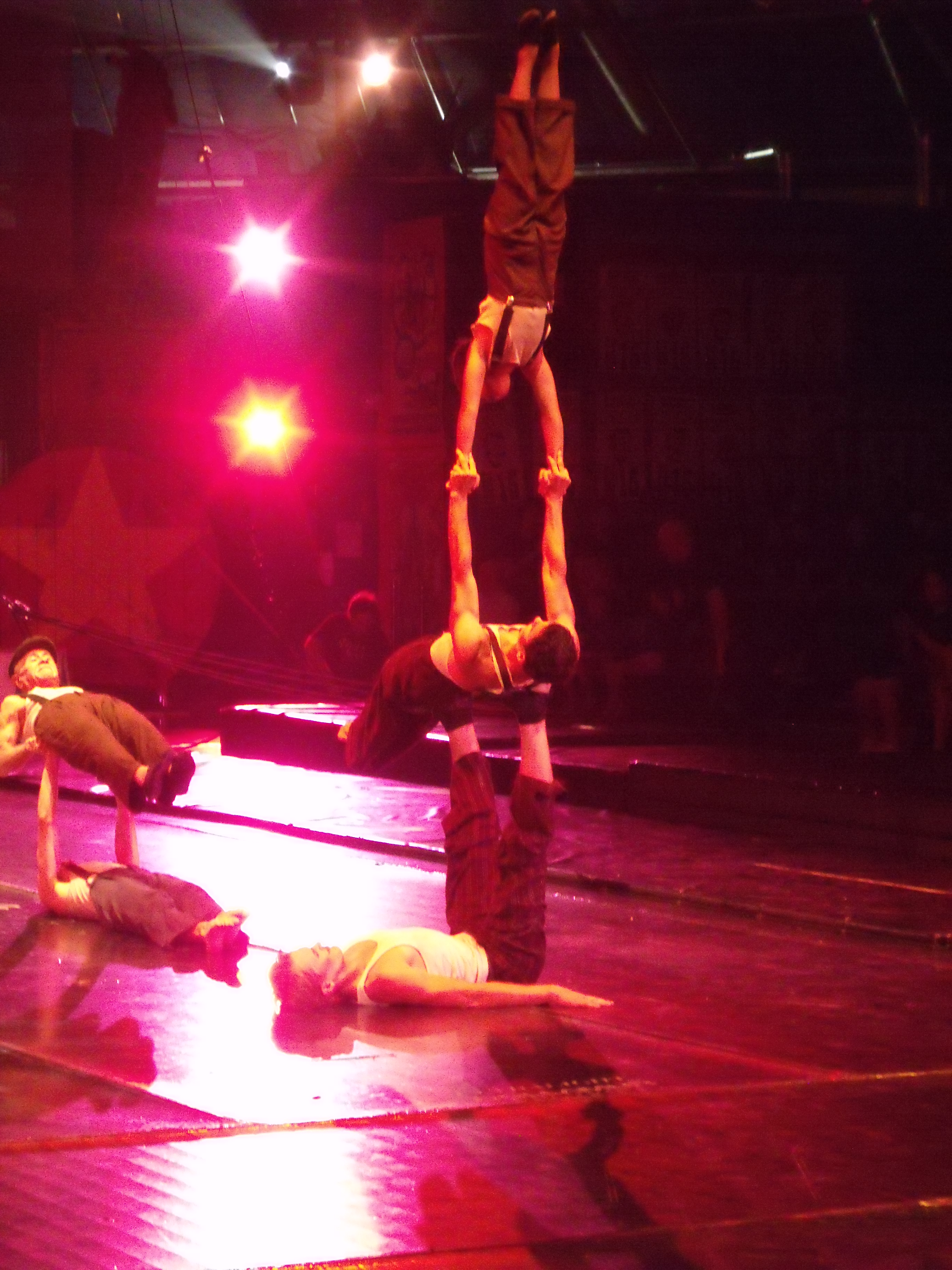
A handbalancing act from Sawdust

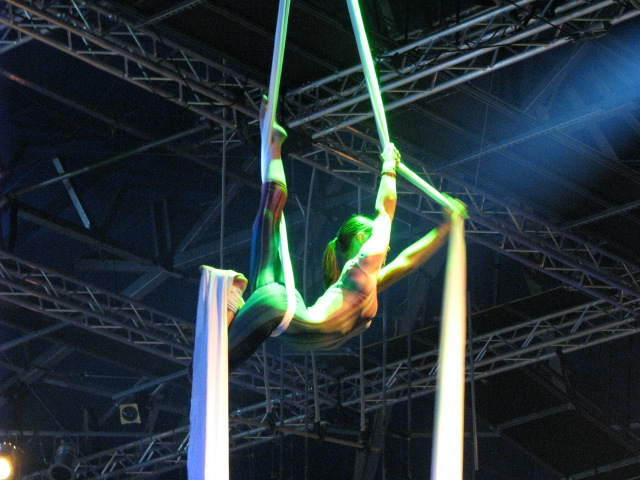
A student on aerial silks

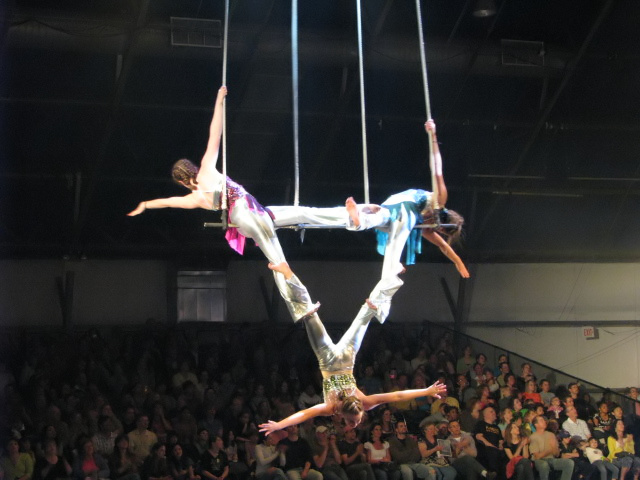
Youths performing triple trapeze

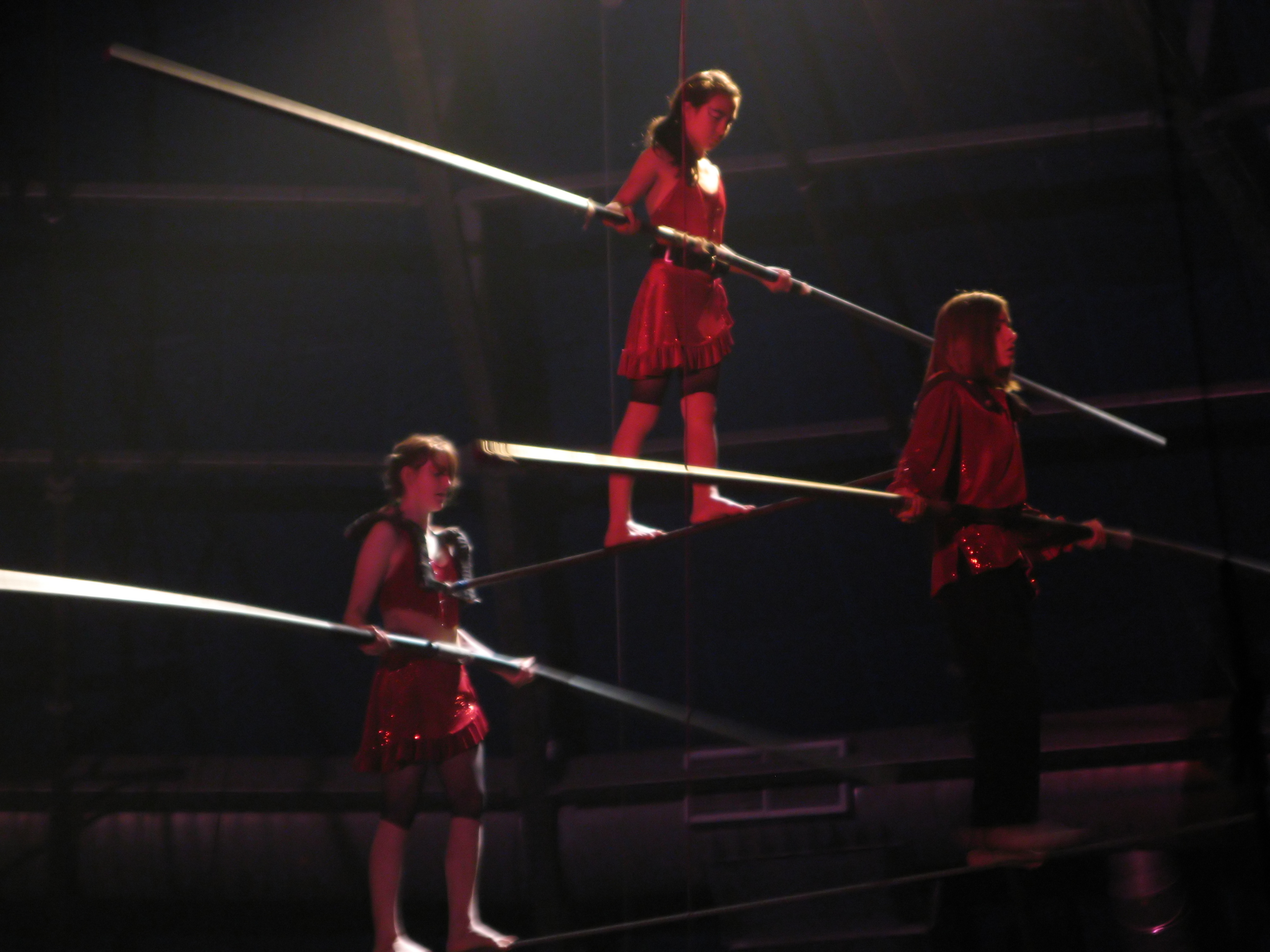
Circus students walking the tightrope

=== Other engagements ===
In addition to shows at their Saint Paul big top, Juventas students have performed across the Minneapolis–Saint Paul metro area and at domestic and international shows and competitions. Performers have appeared at local events including the Saint Paul Winter Carnival, Minneapolis mayor R. T. Rybak's 2002 inauguration at the Minneapolis City Hall, and at the Ordway Center for the Performing Arts as part of the Flint Hills International Children's Festival. Students have presented their work at a variety of local public, retail, and theater spaces. (Note: Venues at which Juventas students have appeared include: the Mall of America; Roy Wilkins Auditorium; RiverCentre; the Minnesota Children's Museum; Ecolab Plaza; Nicollet Mall; the touring Shrine Circus in Minneapolis.) Students have also participated non-Juventas shows, including a 2004 Minnesota Fringe Festival production, the 2005 world premiere of Tin Forest with the Minnesota Orchestra at Orchestra Hall, the Children's Theatre Company's 2008 stage adaptation of Madeline and the Gypsies, and the 2012 adaptation of Jack Prelutsky's The Dragons Are Singing Tonight at The Southern Theater. In 2010, a cohort of Juventas students traveled to perform in Chattanooga, Tennessee, at the RiverRocks Festival. Outside the United States, performers have traveled to compete, including at the International Circus Festival in Latina, Italy, and at the Circus Ring of Friendship Festival in Norrköping, Sweden, in which the troupe's triple trapeze team garnered the gold medal. In April 2015, a Circus Juventas spinning cube team performed at the Circus Waldoni Festival in Darmstadt, Germany, where they tied for first place. Students from the school will perform at the Smithsonian Folklife Festival in Washington, D.C., in June and July 2017.

== Music ==
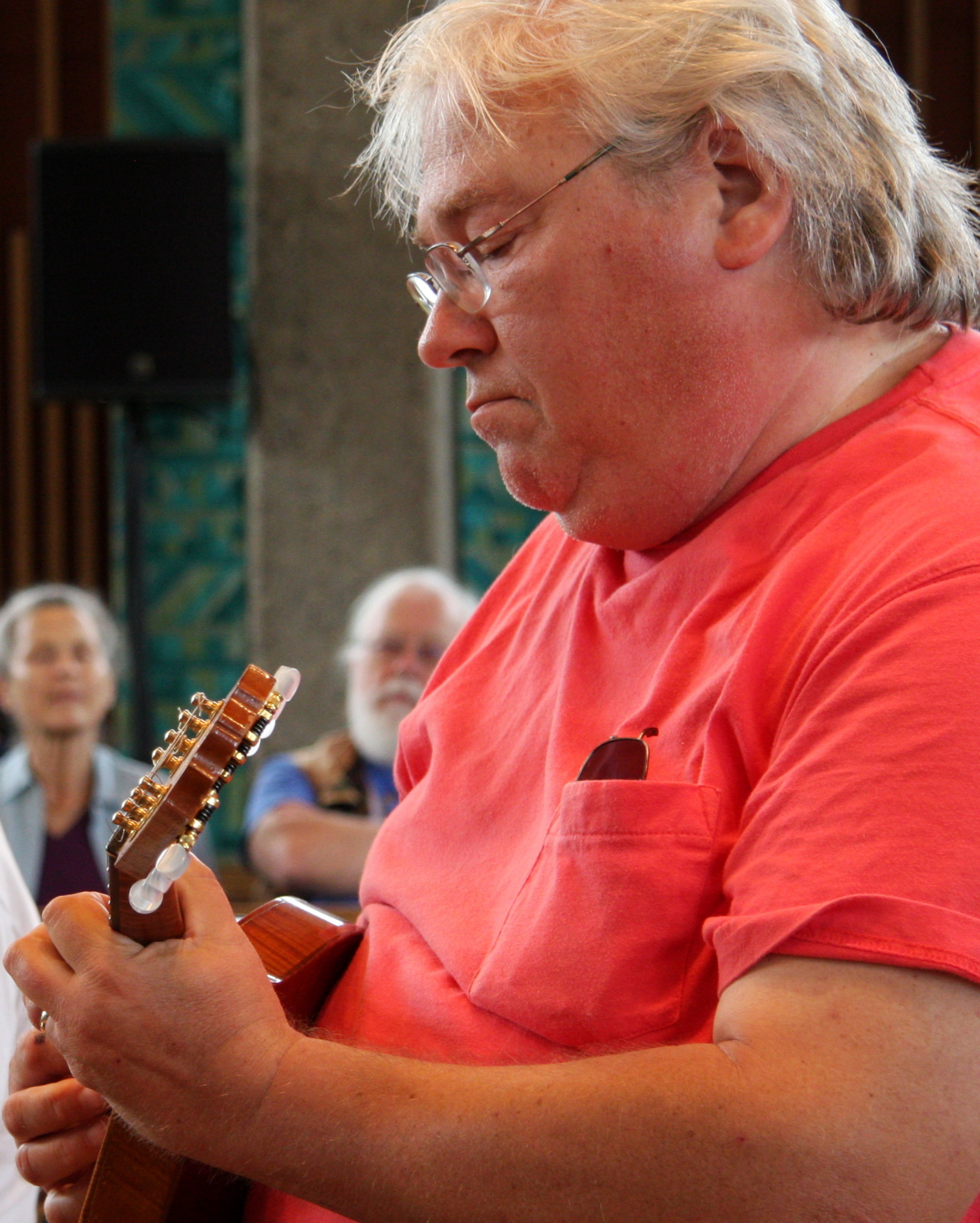
Ostroushko playing mandolin in 2014

Much of the accompaniment for the big top summer shows came from Peter Ostroushko, a local mandolin player. Ostroushko, known for his work on the radio show A Prairie Home Companion, became involved in the youth circus after his daughter saw a show and decided to join. In 2005, the Butlers discovered Ostroushko's affinity for the mandolin and fiddle, and asked if he would play a Celtic song at the premiere of their upcoming summer big top show, Dyrnwych. He happily agreed, having expressed a lifelong dream of joining a circus, and played the track, "See It There/Con Cassidy's", not only at Dyrnwych's opening but also at each of its subsequent 18 performances. The following year, he composed original music for the 2006 Juventas show, Pazzanni, and expanded his band to five members, including himself on mandolin, fiddle, and mandocello, Marc Anderson on percussion, Dan Chouinard on piano, accordion, and keyboard, Dirk Freymuth on electric and acoustic guitars, and Joel Sayles on electric and acoustic bass guitars. Ostroushko again provided a score for Atlanticus and RavensManor, continued in 2010 with Sawdust, then Grimm, and finally Showdown. Tracks from the first four shows for which he played, from Dyrnwych to RavensManor, are anthologized on the album Peter Joins the Circus, published by Borderland Productions in 2008.

== Reception ==
Jando Dominique, reporting for Spectacle: An Online Journal of Circus Arts, summarized audience and critical reception for Circus Juventas's shows by describing them as "always sold out and enthusiastically reviewed by the press." Renee Valois cited the age of the performers and the proximity between them and the audience when she asked in a St. Paul Pioneer Press review of Oz comparing the circus school with Cirque du Soleil, "Dare I say Circus Juventas is more exciting than the troupe that inspired it?" Writing for Minnesota Monthly, Amanda Bankston commended the technical skill and professionalism of the performers in 2012's Showdown: "There is nothing child-like about the talent in this show. The budding stars fearlessly swing, flip, and soar through the air like pros." In Spectacle, Dominique noted that Juventas's productions consistently have "a polish and style not often seen in youth circuses, or most professional ones, for that matter."

Susannah Schouweiler of Knight Arts wrote, "at two hours and 45 minutes, plus a 20-minute intermission, [Grimm's] run time is an awfully long haul for the smallest circus-goers." Critics have also commented on the occasional misstep in a performance; Rohan Preston noted in his review of Grimm that "there are moments – just a few stand out – when you realize that these are students, after all, in a celebrated after-school program. You want them to succeed, even if they do not always." Similarly, writing for BroadwayWorld, Elaina Lenertz stated, "Sometimes their silks routines are a bit out of sync and sometimes the show features dance routines from younger kids who are still mastering stunts. Despite this, the performance is very impressive."
