= FSU Flying High Circus =

Extra-curricular activity under FSU's Division of Student Affairs

Coordinates: 30°26′25.4″N 84°18′09.05″W

- Florida State University Flying High Circus
- Formation: September 1, 1947; 78 years ago
- Founder: Jack Haskin
- Headquarters: Florida State University
- Services: Live performance
- Director: Chad Mathews
- Affiliations: European Federation of Professional Circus Schools
- Website: FSU Circus Official Website

The Florida State University (FSU) "Flying High" Circus located in Tallahassee, Florida, is an extra-curricular activity under Florida State University's Division of Student Affairs. All members of the FSU Circus are required to be a degree-seeking student registered at Florida State University and are accepted after an audition.

The FSU Circus is primarily a three-ring aerial and stage presentation with no animal acts. Student performers rig all of their own equipment, set up the circus's tent, sew costumes and produce lights and sound for performances.

== History ==
The Flying High Circus was founded in 1947 by Jack Haskin as an extracurricular activity under the Division of Student Affairs at FSU, as well as the Oglesby Student Union. The program was created to integrate men and women at the newly co-ed institution.

== Donation ==
The Clyde Beatty Circus was purchased and combined with the Cole Bros. Circus in 1956 by Jerry Collins, Frank McClosky, Walter Kernan and Randolph Calhoun. The Clyde Beatty-Cole Brothers Circus changed from railroad to truck transportation and began wintering in DeLand, Florida. Collins and showman Frank McClosky operated it throughout the 1960s and 1970s. Kernan died in 1963, and after McClosky died in 1979, Collins ran the show himself. In 1981, Collins donated the $2.5 million circus to Florida State University saying he wanted to "benefit people of all ages. I want to preserve the tented circus for children and also to help the students at Florida State." The following year, FSU sold their gift to John W. Pugh for $2 million, who formed The New Cole Bros. Circus.

== Curriculum ==
Through the School of Sports Management, Physical Education and Recreation a one-semester, one credit hour class, "Circus Activities" (PEM 1952) that teaches students the basics of juggling, hand balancing, aerial ballet, several other aerial acts, and equipment rigging. Enrollment is encouraged but not mandatory for participation in the circus. The majority of the student performers continue to pursue a career in the discipline from which they graduate. Only a small percentage of the performers seek a professional circus career.

== Performances and touring ==
The FSU Circus generates its own revenue by performing for various sponsors throughout the southeastern United States and hosting weekend shows each spring at the Jack Haskin Circus Complex on the FSU campus. These shows, known as "Homeshows," are traditionally performed the first weekends of April, and are free for Florida State University Students to attend. Florida State University's Parents Weekend is another performance opportunity for the students on summer staff with the Flying High Circus. In recent years, the Flying High Circus introduced the Halloween Show, in which the students perform their traditional acts but with a Halloween theme.

Additionally, the circus has conducted a summer recreation program at Callaway Gardens Resort since 1961. Around twenty-five dedicated students from the Flying High Circus live and work at the gardens, working as performers and camp counselors for the Gardens' Summer Family Adventure for twelve weeks. The students perform multiple times a week, and work with the campers from ages 7–18, as well as running a Circus Recreation Program, and the Ropes Course for the Adults and Teens staying at the resort.

Beginning in the summer of 2009, the Flying High Circus introduced a summer circus camp held at the Florida State University. Over the course of the summer, campers get to learn and try out different circus acts such as Spanish webs, cloud swing, juggling, and the flying trapeze.

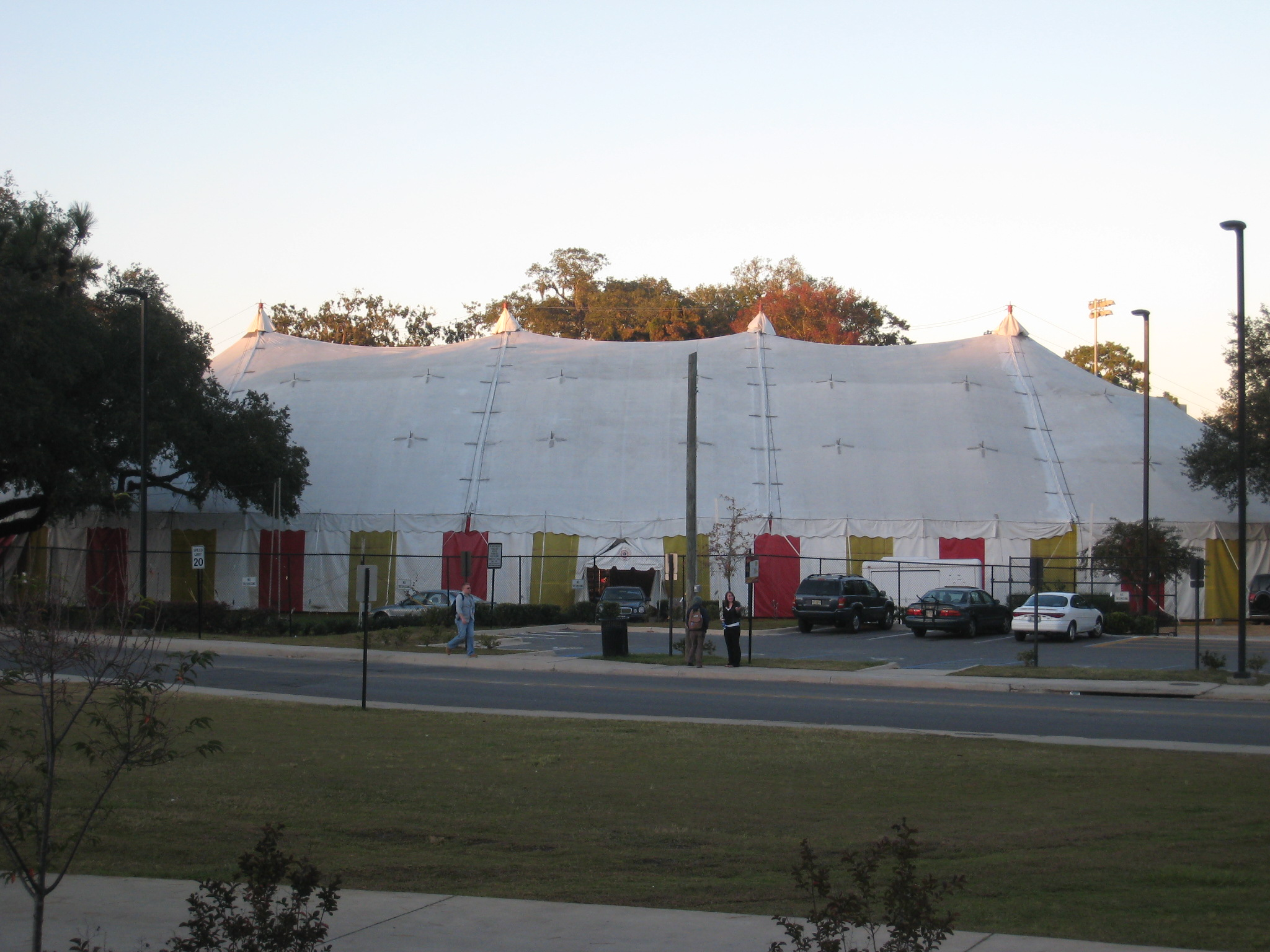
The Flying High Circus Big Top, Jack Haskin Circus Complex, Tallahassee, Florida

COVID-19 required the circus to suspend their programs during 2021.

== List of directors ==
- Jack Haskin (1947 - 1960)
- Addison Gilbert (1960 - 1964)
- Adrian Catarzi (1965 - 1972)
- Richard "Dickie" Brinson (1972 - 2007)
- Chad Mathews (2007–present)

== List of acts ==
Specific acts vary from season to season, but the FSU Circus typically incorporates many of the following into their shows:

- Flying Trapeze - "The Flying Seminoles"
- Double Trapeze
- High Wire
- Cloud Swing
- Juggling
- Bicycle Built for Five
- Roman Rings
- Rola Bola
- Quartette Adagio
- Swinging Trapeze
- Hand-Balancing
- Three-Lane Breakaway
- Two-Lane Breakaway
- Aerial High Casting
- Spanish Web
- Sky Pole
- Russian Bar
- Ringmaster
- Fire Poi
- Perch Pole
- Slack Wire
- Skating Adagio
- Unicycle Adagio
- Lowcasting
- Teeterboard
- Chinese Pole
- Aerial Hoop
- Triple Trapeze
- Hanging Perch
