= List of circus skills =

Circus skills are a group of disciplines that have been performed as entertainment in circus, carnival, sideshow, busking, variety, vaudeville, or music hall shows. Most circus skills are still being performed today. Many are also practiced by non-performers as a hobby.

Circus schools and instructors use various systems of categorization to group circus skills by type. Systems that have attempted to formally organize circus skills into pragmatic teaching groupings include the Gurevich system (the basis of the Russian Circus School's curriculum) and the Hovey Burgess system.

== Circus skills ==
- Acrobalance
- Acrobatics
- Acro dance
- Adagio
- Aerial hammock
- Aerial hoop
- Aerial pole
- Aerial silk
- Aerial straps
- Artistic cycling
- Balancing
- Banquine
- Baton twirling
- Buffoonery
- Bullwhip
- Bungee trapeze
- Cannonball catching
- Carnival barking
- Chair balancing
- Chinese pole
- Cigar box juggling
- Cloud swing
- Clowning
- Club swinging
- Contact juggling
- Contortion
- Corde lisse
- Cradle
- Cyr wheel
- Danish pole
- Devil sticks
- Diabolo or Chinese yo-yo
- Double trapeze
- Fire performance
- Flag spinning
- Flow star
- Flying trapeze
- Foot juggling
- Freestanding ladder
- German wheel
- Globe of death
- Hair hang
- Hand to hand
- Hand balancing
- Hand walking
- Hat manipulation
- Hoop diving
- Hooping
- Human cannonball
- Human pyramid
- Juggling
- Jump rope
- Knife throwing
- Lasso
- Lion taming
- Mexican cloud swing
- Mime
- Multiple trapeze
- Object manipulation
- Perch (equilibristic)
- Physical comedy
- Plate spinning
- Pogo sticking
- Poi spinning
- Puppetry
- Rebound straps
- Ringmaster
- Risley
- Rola bola, balance board
- Rolling globe
- Roman ladders
- Russian bar
- Russian swing
- Skywalk (aka inverted loop walk)
- Slacklining
- Slackwire balancing
- Spanish web
- Springboard
- Stage combat
- Static trapeze
- Stilt walking
- Teeterboard
- Tightrope walking
- Trampolining
- Trapeze
- Trick riding
- Trick roping
- Tumbling
- Twirling
- Unicycle
- Ventriloquism
- Voltige
- Wall of death
- Wheel of Death
- Whistling

== Sideshow attractions ==
- Bed of nails
- Bee bearding
- Blade box
- Body modification
- Body piercing
- Chapeaugraphy
- Contortion
- Electric act
- Entomophagy (insect eating)
- Escapology
- Fire breathing
- Fire eating
- Girl to Gorilla, a Pepper's Ghost illusion
- Glass eating
- Glass walking
- Gurner
- Hook suspension
- Human blockhead
- Human dartboard
- Impalement arts
- Iron tongue
- Magic acts
- Regurgitator
- Shallow diving
- Snake charmer
- Strongman
- Sword ladder
- Sword swallowing
