= Roman ladders =

Circus skill

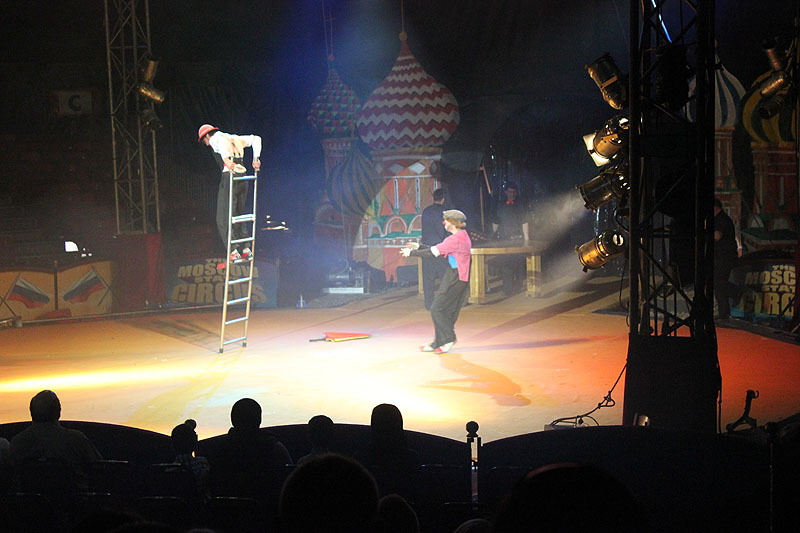
A performer on a ladder at the Moscow State Circus

Roman ladders are an equilibristic circus skill where four or more people perform acrobatics on specially made ladders. The performers in the middle push the ladders out, while the performers on the outside of the ladders perform various poses and tricks.
