= Brian Miser =

American human cannonball and performer

Peru, Indiana native Brian Miser, also known as The Human Fuse, is a self-taught human cannonball. Featured on the 14th season of America's Got Talent and a Guinness World Record holder, Miser is an American circus performer and had a headlining act at Ringling Bros. Barnum & Bailey Circus,. Miser has appeared nationally on Conan O'Brien, David Letterman (twice), Huffington Post and CBS radio over the course of his career thus far. His Las Vegas stunt closed down the strip.

== Early life ==
Growing up Peru, Indiana in the 'circus capital of the world', Miser entered the world of circus at the age of eight years old. His life of circus began with his aptitude for trampolining. Performing in the local amateur circus provided a younger Miser with the opportunity to develop his passion for the circus.

After graduating high school, Miser went to an amusement park, performing trampoline, and learnt flying trapeze there. Following this, he and one of his brothers joined Ringling Bros. Barnum & Bailey Circus as flying trapeze artists.

== Career ==
In the 133rd Edition of Ringling Bros. Barnum & Bailey Circus, Miser made his human cannonball debut as Bailey's Comet. This act included lighting himself on fire as he arced through the air. Shortly after this, his wife Tina joined him creating history as the only double-human cannonball couple in the world at the time.

A number of tours later, Brian became the trigger man for Tina and her cannon partner. Miser wasn't grounded for long before he was to be blasted out of the cannon once again. He created a new, more "electrifying" act, and re-introduced fire into his performance, becoming the Human Fuse who launches from a custom-created Human Crossbow.

On Saturday June 16, 2014, Brian Miser etched his name in the Guinness Book of World Records, as the first "Human Fuse". Hosted at the Peru Amateur Circus building on North Broadway Street, this stunt consisted of Miser launching himself from his custom-made human crossbow 104 feet, 7 inches into the air and covering a distance of 31.87 meters. Miser converted his human cannon into a giant crossbow by installing a sled and a bow behind the cannon to launch himself. Self-taught, Miser designed and built several of the cannons he has used in his performances.

In 2011, Miser closed down a portion of the Las Vegas Strip for a stunt in which he launched himself over 110 feet down the strip while engulfed in flames. He was also enlisted by Captain Morgan in 2015, to launch their 'Cannon Blast' range, the event taking place in Orlando

In a career spanning over 18 years, Miser has been shot out of a cannon more than 6500 times.

== Personal life ==
Miser resides in Peru, Indiana with his children and his wife Tina who he met whilst volunteering at Peru's annual summer circus festival in 1999. A short time after they met Tina became Miser's trigger woman, shooting him out of the cannon. They would soon feature as a double cannonball act on Ringling Bros. Barnum & Bailey Circus.

After the closure of Ringling Bros. Barnum & Bailey in 2017, Miser purchased one of the authentic train cars from their iconic fleet. The car is now situated on his property.
