= Pole balancing =

Pole balancing may refer to:

- Perch (equilibristic)
- Inverted pendulum
