= Rolling globe =

Circus skill where a performer balances atop a large sphere

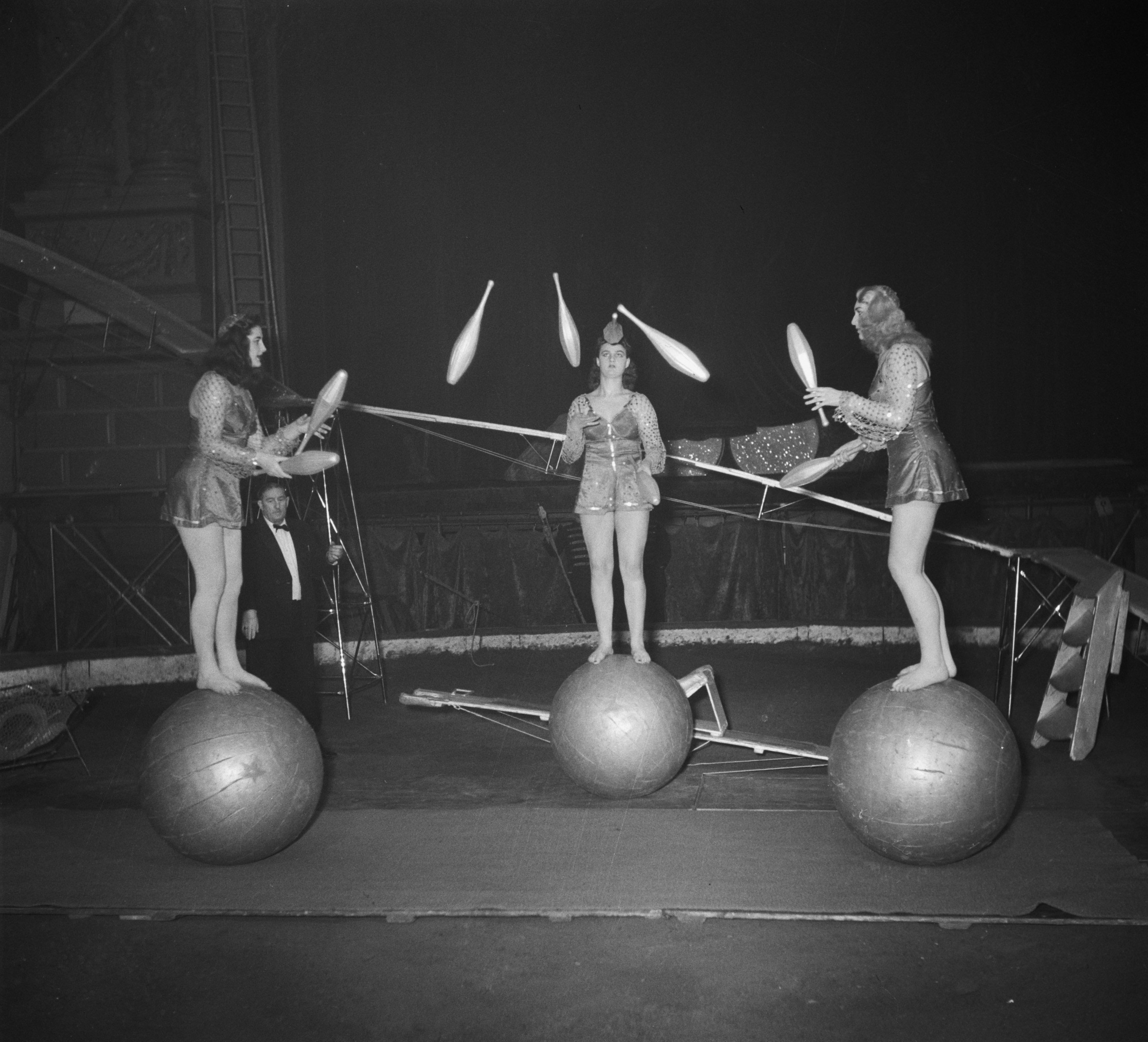
Jugglers on rolling globes at the Strassburger Circus, 1952

The rolling globe or walking globe is a circus skill in which a performer balances atop a large sphere. Various gymnastic or juggling stunts may be performed while the performer moves and controls the position of the ball with their feet and/or hands.
