= Balance board =

Device used in various ways for balance training, fitness, or entertainment

A balance board is a device used as a circus skill, for recreation, balance training, athletic training, brain development, therapy, musical training and other kinds of personal development.

It is a lever similar to a see-saw that the user usually stands on, usually with the left and right foot at opposite ends of the board. The user's body must stay balanced enough to keep the board's edges from touching the ground and to keep from falling off the board.

A different challenge is presented by each of the five basic types of balance boards and their subtypes. Some of them can be attempted successfully by three-year-olds and elderly people, and some, because of their steepness and speed, are difficult and dangerous for professional athletes.

In their design, what differentiates the five types (and their subtypes) is how unstable each of them is, i.e., in how many and in which of the three dimensions of space each board turns and/or sways and how freely its fulcrum contacts the board and the ground.

== Uses and users ==
The Bongo Board in a newsreel from the 1950s

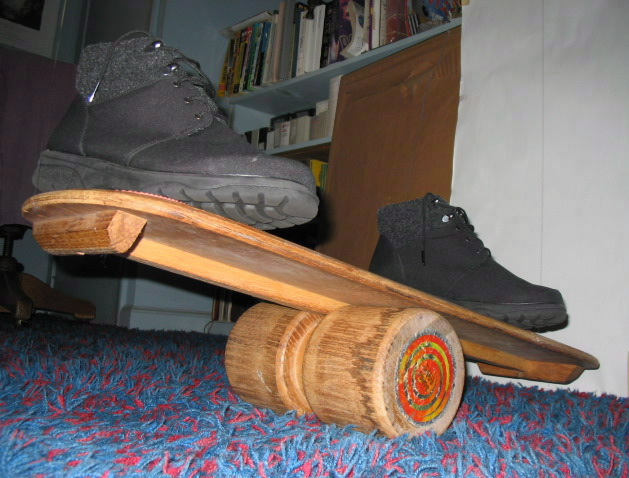
Bongo Board by Stanley Washburn Jr.

In 1953, Stanley Washburn Jr. filed a patent for a balance board with the intention of its use for recreation. These boards quickly become popular for skiers and surfers to practice their balancing skills in the off season or when natural conditions were poor. The balance board is a device that has come to be used for training in sports and martial arts, for physical fitness and for non-athletic purposes that are listed here.

It is used to develop balance, motor coordination skills, weight distribution and core strength; to prepare people, before and after they reach old age, to avoid injurious falls; to prevent sports injuries, especially to the ankle and knee; and for rehabilitation after injuries to several parts of the body.

Uses of a balance board beyond its athletic origin have become more common: to expand neural networks that enable the left and right hemispheres of the brain to communicate with each other, thereby increasing its efficiency; to develop sensory integration and cognitive skills in children with developmental disorders; to make dancers lighter on their feet; to teach singers optimal posture for the control of air-flow; to teach musicians how to hold their instrument; to shake off writer's block and other inhibitors of creativity; as an accessory to yoga and as a form of yoga, cultivating holistic health, self-awareness and calm.

Some people use a balance board for recreational purposes, enjoying the challenge that this equipment presents.

=== Circus skill ===
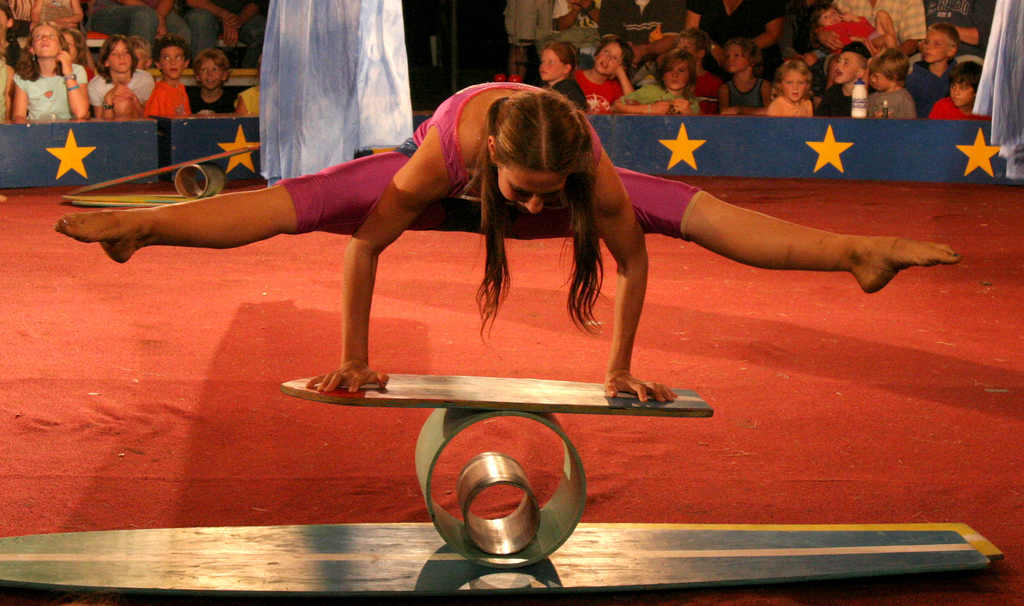
Rola bola

The balance board is used as a circus skill for recreation and performance. Many circus performers refer to the balance board as the rola bola. Skillful and dramatic balancing acts using the rola bola are performed by circus performers in traditional circus as well as by freelance circus skills artists. The performance can involve a single rola bola or a stack of multiple rola bolas on top of one another to increase the challenge and visual spectacle. Some circus performers also combine the use of the rola bola with other circus skills such as juggling or equilibristics to present a different visual spectacle.

== Structure ==
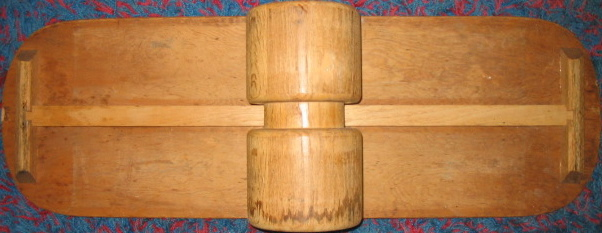
The roller and underside of a rocker-roller board

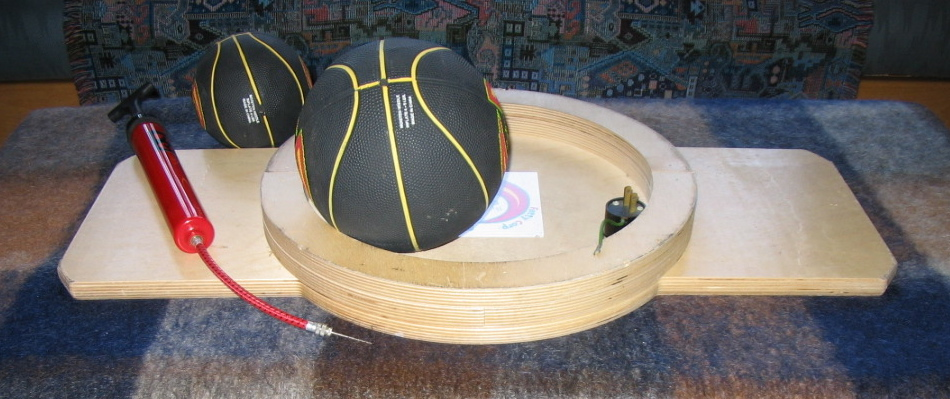
The underside of a sphere-and-ring board

Lower limb proprioceptive work

The user stands on a board or other platform which is on top of an unstable ground-contacting member, the fulcrum. The height of the fulcrum of most models is between 3 and 6 inches (i.e., the top of the fulcrum is that distance above the ground). Due to the fulcrum's instability, the user must remain balanced and coordinated in order to prevent the board from touching the ground.

Thus, the rider stimulates, exercises and teaches the parts of the body that implement the act of balancing (toes, soles, ankles, knees, hips, shoulders, arms and neck) and the parts of the body and brain that create the sense of balance and that engineer the implementation of the act of balancing (inner ears, cerebellum, proprioceptors and eyes).

The degrees of movement through which the board can move – sliding, pivoting, rotating, tilting, rolling or some combination of those – and the speed of the board differ in different types and subtypes of models, depending on the shape and size of the fulcrum, whether it is attached to the board and, if it isn't attached, the method(s) by which it is constrained by the board, if any. With an increase of speed and with each additional degree of movement through which one model or another can move, the need to avoid losing control of the board forces the rider to exercise considerably more skill in order to avoid falling.

In rocker boards and wobble boards, the fulcrum is attached to the board. In rocker-roller boards and sphere-and-ring boards, the fulcrum is a separate piece from the board. In sphere-and-ring boards, the fulcrum (an inflatable or solid ball) is constrained by a ring on the board's underside. In some rocker-roller boards, the fulcrum (a cylinder or mainly a cylinder) isn't constrained by the board (except by their friction), and in most rocker-rollers the cylinder is constrained by the board in any of five ways (a different number and combination of those ways in each type of rocker-roller) that are described below, in this article's "Rocker-Roller Boards" section.

Positions other than standing are also used, in order to work on particular muscles and skills. For better foot traction, the stood-on surface of most boards is manufactured with an unsmooth texture: for plastic models, in the molding; for wooden models, with grip tape or rubber. A smooth surface under the feet or shoes can cause a user to slip off a balance board and fall.

Wobble boards are the only type of balance board that is commonly made of plastic. Being no longer than their width, they don't need to be as strong and warp-resistant as other balance boards.

== Types ==
There are more than a hundred models of balance boards on the market in the United States. Each of them is a version of one of about fifteen types of balance board. Each of these models and types can be classified as one of five basic types of balance board according to two binary parameters: whether its fulcrum is attached to the board and whether the board tilts in only two opposite directions (left and right or forward and back) or in every direction (360 degrees).

More specifically:

	Bipolar	360 degrees	The task
Attached	Rocker	Wobble	Static balance
Not attached	Rocker-roller	Sphere-and-ring	Dynamic balance

In other words:

- A rocker-roller board is a rocker board whose fulcrum is a separate piece.
- A sphere-and-ring board is a wobble board whose fulcrum is a separate piece.
- A wobble board is a rocker board that tilts toward 360 degrees.
- A sphere-and-ring board is a rocker-roller board that tilts toward 360 degrees.
- A spring board rests on compression springs that tilts towards 360 degrees

Those five analogies are not precise definitions. They ignore some details of models' structure.

=== Rocker ===
A rocker board is the most basic and least challenging type of balance board. It is a flat board with a fulcrum attached to the board's underside. In some models the fulcrum is perpendicular to the board's length and in the other models the fulcrum is two rockers that are parallel to each other and parallel to the board's length, one in front of the person who is standing on the board and one behind. The ground-contacting edge of the fulcrum is curved in most models and is flat in some models.

With one foot placed at each end of the board, the user can tilt it from side to side until the balance point is found and can then either try to keep the board stationary or continue rocking.

Rocker boards offer only one degree of movement: part rotation about the longitudinal axis, i.e., banking (left-right tilting).

Most rocker boards are made by manufacturers of toys or of gym equipment.

=== Rocker-roller ===
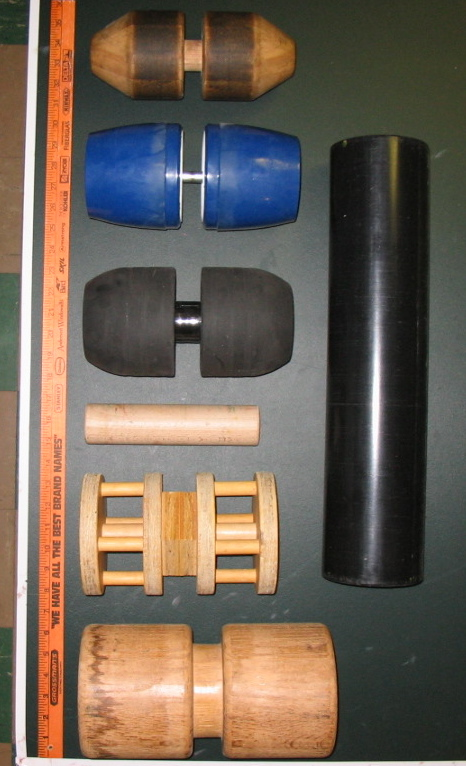
The rollers of seven rocker-roller boards

Rocker-roller boards add a degree of instability to the rocker board that makes them much more challenging for the rider than a rocker board is. Rather than on a fixed pivot, a rocker-roller's board is placed on a cylindrical roller; this fulcrum is a wheel that moves in relation to the ground and in relation to the board. The board's pivot point shifts back and forth as the cylinder rolls beneath it. In almost all models the two flat ends of the wheel/roller are about as far from each other as the width of the board. In most models the axis of the roller is perpendicular to the board's length. Thus, as the rider's weight moves over the roller, the board both tilts from side to side and also slides sideways. In models whose roller can be placed with its axis parallel to the board's length, the board slides and tilts toward the front and back (if the rider's feet are oriented accordingly).

The roller has a different form in different models. Some are a cylinder and some are a cylinder in their midsection that tapers toward the two ends. That tapering enables tricky moves by the rider. How the roller and rocker interface can vary. Rollers may have grooves to fit a guide on the board to keep the roller aligned with the rocker and prevent the rocker from sliding along the roller. Rockers may have guard rails at the ends to prevent the rocker from rolling off the roller.

The diameter of the roller of almost all rocker-rollers is between 3.5 and 6 inches at its widest section. The rollers of the rola bolas that circus performers use are usually between 7 and 9 inches in diameter.

=== Wobble ===
Video of an oversized wobble board whose fulcrum, unlike the fulcrum of a standard wobble board, is connected to a stationary base

Video of a wobble board's instability

The fulcrum of almost all wobble boards is a semi-sphere or smaller spherical cap (or a shape that is approximately such) whose flat side is attached to the center of the board's underside. This allows the board to pivot in all directions, through 360 degrees. Standing on a wobble board exercises muscles that are not exercised by standing on boards that tilt in only two (opposite) directions. In almost all models, the board's length and width are about the same size; a circle is the usual shape.

Wobble boards are widely used in child development, gymnasiums, sport training, prevention of injuries to the ankle and knee, rehabilitation after ankle, knee and hip injuries and physiotherapy.

The basic use of a wobble board is to stand on it with both feet, and tilt in any direction without letting the board tilt so far that its edge touches the ground. Other common exercises are squats, standing on the board with one foot while keeping the other foot off the ground, push-ups (pressing down on the board with the hands while lying face-down with only the knees or toes contacting the ground), and sit-ups (with the board under the buttocks). Any exercise is much more work when a person's weight is on a wobble board than when supported by a stable and level base such as a floor.

For additional muscle exercise while wobbling, some models can have an elastic stretch band attached: each hand pulls up one of the bands ends. The ends of the band fit through two opposed holes near the rim of the board, for quick attachment and detachment.

A wobble board offers full rotation about the vertical axis (i.e., yawing, i.e., twisting), part rotation about the transverse/lateral axis (i.e., pitching, i.e., backward-forward tilting) and part rotation about the longitudinal axis (i.e., banking, i.e., left-right tilting). Additional movement, translation (i.e., sliding or skidding, usually unintended and unwanted), across the supporting surface is possible, except for the few wobble boards that have a stationary base. Sliding occurs much less often and usually across a shorter distance than in the case of a rocker-roller board and sphere-and-ring board.

Most wobble boards are made of plastic. Wooden models are better able than plastic ones to withstand long use, such as in a gym. Some plastic models are more durable than others.

Wobble boards are made by manufacturers of gym, sports and physical therapy equipment.

=== Sphere-and-ring ===
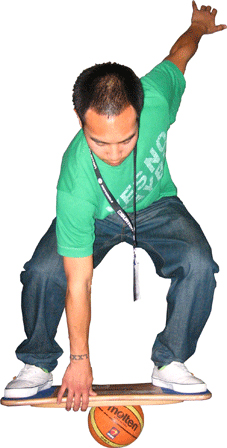
The fulcrum is an inflatable rubber ball.

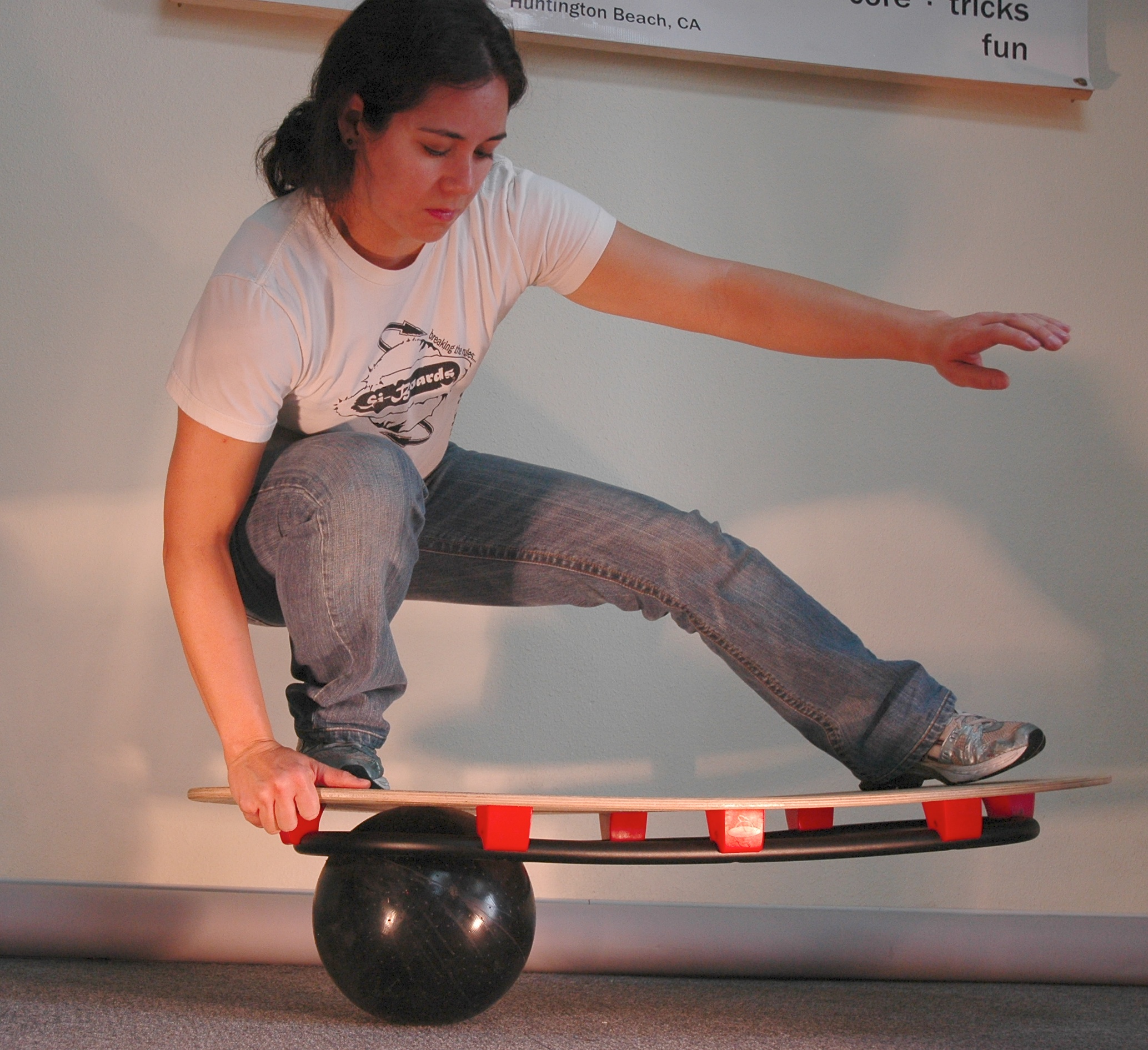
The fulcrum is a solid urethane ball.

A sphere, either an inflatable rubber ball (such as a basketball) or a solid polyurethane ball, is the fulcrum on which the board is balanced, and the fulcrum is kept contained under the board by a guard rail or ring on the underside. By redistributing his/her weight across the board, the rider can move the board in any direction– side to side, forward and backward, twisting, diagonal, and full rotations or any combination of these movements. A rider can move the board vertically by doing an advanced maneuver called an ollie. It can also be tilted in any direction and fully rotated. Sphere-and-ring boards provide the greatest freedom of movement of any type of balance board, allowing rotation about all axes (yawing, pitching and banking) and translation (i.e., sliding) in both transverse (i.e., lateral) and longitudinal directions. They, like wobble boards, simultaneously exercise muscles that are not exercised by use of boards that tilt about only one axis (in two opposite directions).

When balancing or riding on a sphere-and-ring board, the difficulty and ride speed, which is how fast the rider can move the board on the ball, are determined by the following:

Ring shape and size
Larger rings allow more movement of the fulcrum. Different shapes change how the fulcrum might move.
Sphere's size, weight, and rigidity
These affect how fast the fulcrum moves and how much strength is required to move it.
Board's shape and size
Changing these can affect the weight and weight distribution of the board, changing how much strength is required to move it.

=== Aquatic ===
These are underwater balance boards. They were developed for physical therapy and are used also for recreation. Besides the general advantages of aquatic therapy over non-aquatic therapy (the use of the smooth resistance of water instead of the jerky resistance of weights and the avoidance of burdening an injured joint with excessive weight– in this case, the weight of the patient's own body), aquatic balance boards have the specific advantage over non-aquatic balance boards of saving a patient who slips off of a board from the impact of falling and crashing into a floor. Slipping off of an aquatic balance board is safe as long as the user knows to avoid inhaling while underwater and knows how to tread water.

Three models are produced by Theraquatics Australia: The Theraquatics Balance Board is a V-shaped rocker board that a user stands, kneels or sits on. The Wonder Board is a V-shaped rocker board that a user kneels or sits on. The Aquatic Balance Board (a.k.a. the Aquafit Balance Board) is a wobble board. The holes in it allow water to fill it, making it neutrally buoyant (i.e., neither sinking on its own nor floating up to the water's surface) so that it is easier to control and safer than it would be if this wobble board were more buoyant. Two products that Theraquatics Australia calls balance boards, its Star Balance Board and its Theraquatics Balance Board with Straps, are not balance boards in the familiar sense of the term, though they can be used for practicing balance skills.

=== Wii ===
The Wii Balance Board is not a rocking board as described in this article, but an electronic board which tracks the user's center of balance. It is used as an accessory with the Wii home video game console and compatible applications such as Wii Fit.

== Psychological aspects ==
Proper use of a balance board is a test of both physical skill and the user's sense of balance.

Another sensation often experienced by a user of a balance board is the sensation of falling. Apart from actually falling, this often occurs during sharp accelerations caused by leaning too far or too quickly. Feeling like falling can raise fears and provoke reflexes that while useful on a stable surface can be counter-productive on a balance board, such as throwing the arms forward to catch the fall or over-correcting and sharply shifting weight onto the opposite leg, causing a fall in the opposite direction.

== Injury risk and prevention ==
Falls from balance boards can break bones, sprain joints, and tear tendons, ligaments and cartilage. These risks can be diminished by preparing the space, wearing protective gear and following manufacturers' other safety recommendations.

Risk can be lowered by anticipating falls and clearing the surrounding area of objects that the rider might fall onto, and making sure that the surface is soft. Some of the best surfaces for balance boarding include a soft yoga mat, a patch of grass, or the sand.

Important protective gear is gear that protects the joints, the head and face, and otherwise protects from bumps and scrapes during falls. Care should be taken in selecting a helmet, as the weight could make falls worse or the shape might be unsuited for protecting from falls and might be pressed into the neck during impact.

Standing on a balance board is extremely dangerous for a person who is prone to dizziness or whose balance is impaired, such as by being tired or under the influence of alcohol or other drugs.
