= Moscow State Circus =

Architectural structure

Coordinates: 55°41′40″N 37°32′24″E

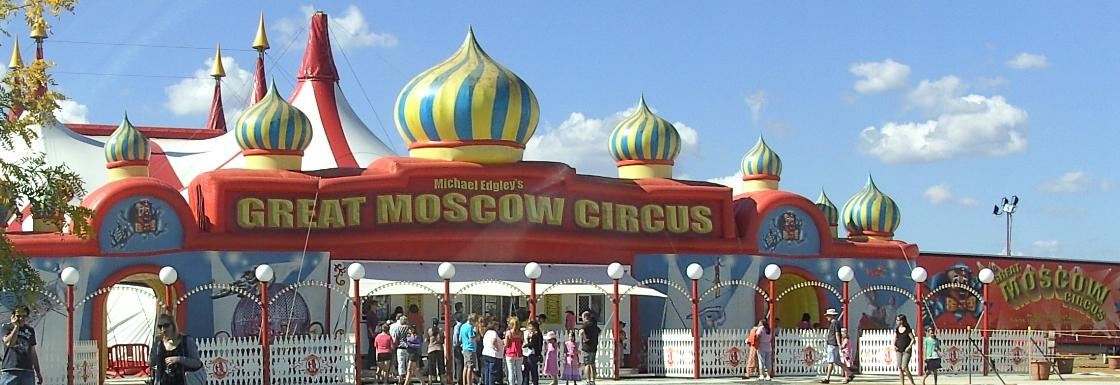
Australian Great Moscow Circus, 2010

The title Moscow State Circus is used for a variety of circuses. Most commonly, it refers to one of the two circus buildings in Moscow, the "Circus Nikulin" (the old circus, featuring animal acts) and the "Bolshoi Circus" (the new circus, featuring trapeze and acrobatics), or to traveling shows which may or may not be directly related to Russia.

The Russian Circus rose during the Soviet period, when acts from many Russian circuses united to tour the United States under the title, "The Moscow Circus." During this time, the circus became a point of pride. Russian Circus traditions include clowning, juggling, acrobatics, contortion, and animal acts (especially bear acts, such as bears who juggle with their feet).

Stylistically, the Soviet circuses were different from their Western counterparts. Their acts were more focused on Eastern European culture, and tended to hold more narrative and be more dance-oriented than their bespangled, action-packed contemporaries. This narrative style has recently become more popular with shows worldwide, with shows by companies including Cirque du Soleil and Cirque Dreams.

== Nationalization ==
The Moscow Circuses, like many other institutions, were nationalized in 1919, and then, in 1957, its operations were handed by the Soyuzgoscirk, the Centralized Circus Administration. In 1929 with the creation of the Moscow Circus School, the USSR became the first country in the world to operate a state-run circus training facility. At the Soviet Circus's peak of popularity in the late 1980s, students at the Moscow Circus School trained for 20 hours every week in various disciplines, and upon completion of training, the young men were required to enlist (though they worked in an entertainment division of the armed forces); women were welcomed, but not required to serve in uniform. Despite the work, approximately a thousand individuals auditioned for the 70 spaces in the school; life as a performer with the Circus was almost as good as being a government official. Artists performed nine shows each week, delighting over 70 million citizens per year, and were guaranteed retirement benefits, childcare for children over one year old, maternity leave, the ability to travel, and in special cases were awarded luxuries, like nicer housing, normally restricted to the political elite. One such performer was the famous clown Oleg Popov, who was awarded the title of "People's Artist of the USSR".

Like their American contemporaries, the Communist government saw the circus as the people's entertainment. Officials considered the circus to be culturally on par with the Ballets Russes or Tchaikovsky, but was much more affordable, and therefore more proletarian, at only about five dollars per ticket. The Soyuzgoscirk established seventy circus buildings across the USSR, and entire towns would turn out to see the shows. Even television contributed to the fame of the Soyuzgoscirk organization, with its Moscow branch receiving at least an hour-long TV summary of its offerings on occasions.

== Style and politics ==
Since these well-attended shows often ran for four hours and were run by the government, they became outlets for Soviet propaganda. Instead of several rings, the Moscow Circus had only one (as was traditional) and the acts told stories, proverbs, or folk legends.

One such act was the "Cranes," a flying trapeze troupe. The "Cranes" were named after and themed by a song depicting fallen Soviet World War II soldiers who fly up into the sky as cranes, instead of being buried in the ground. The show, set to classical music, focused on the story being told, rather than on the display of skill. One of the performers threw a "quad" (4 backward rotations before being caught by the catcher), a rare trick, which would have been the focus of the act in any other kind of show; nevertheless, the performer said that the most important part of the act was the way it was an aesthetic experience. He said it was not the individual skills, "but the simultaneity of our aerial gymnastics and the psychological effectiveness of our acting, all of it working together to move an audience...other circuses have first-rate performers, but we do something special — each act creates a small vignette. These are playlets that give spectators not only the flavor of our life, but also reveal the soul of Soviet man." Aesthetics were very important to the Soviet circus, and every acrobat received formal ballet schooling.

In many respects, the shows resembled American shows of the day: they had parades and a spec, their clowns wore red noses and silly hats, their shows were full of big cats and Liberty Horses. This commonality fostered a sense of international community. One man credited the "peace caravan of circuses," which traveled through the streets of many cities, including Paris, Warsaw, Prague, and Berlin, with "contributing to the [Berlin] Wall's removal." He continued, "For a brief period in 1989, the clowns became the leaders, crossing cultural and national borders, celebrating the end of the Cold War before it was declared over by official parties."

== Bolshoi Circus ==
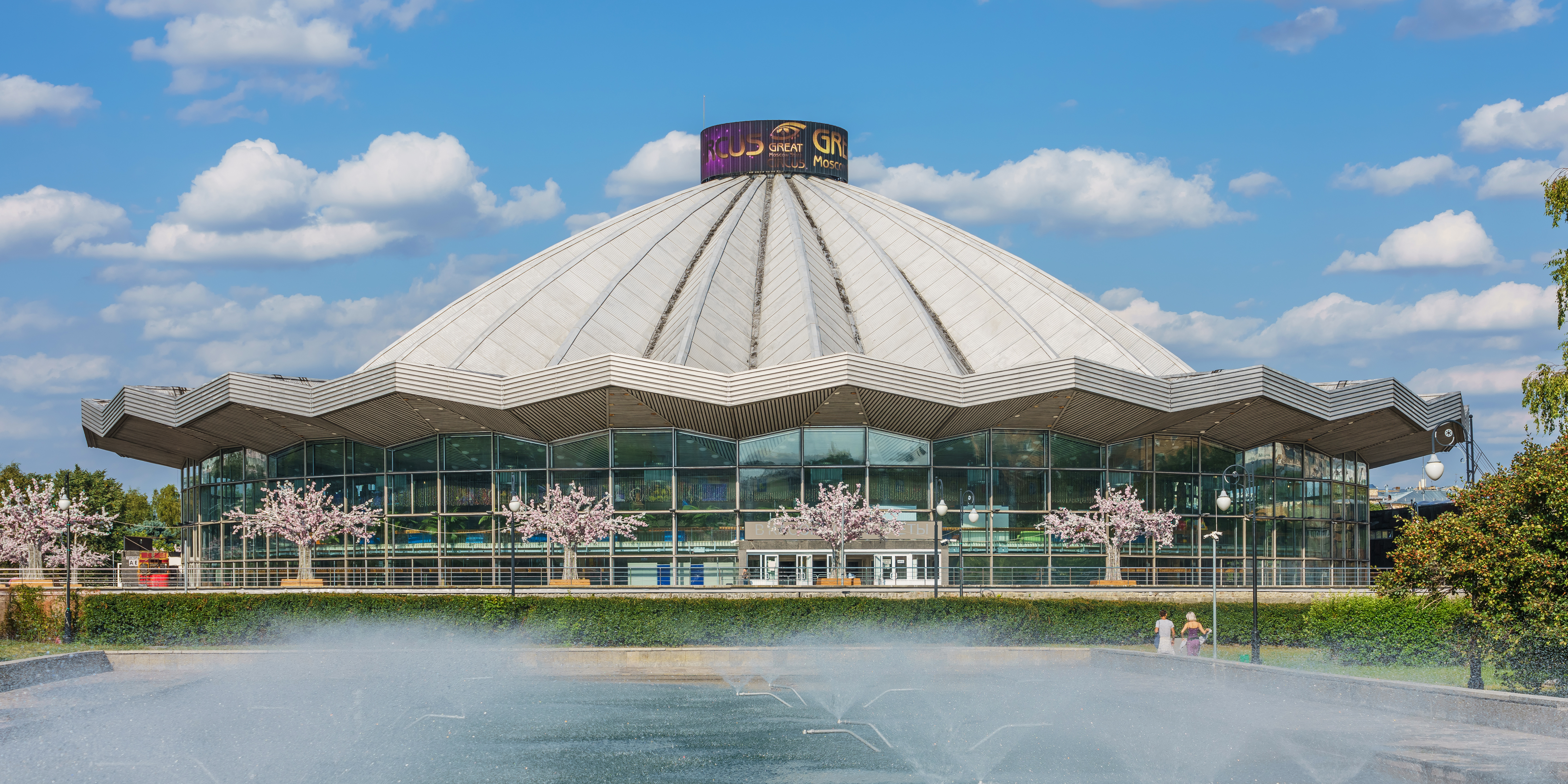
The circus building

The Great Moscow State Circus(Russian: Большой Московский государственный цирк на проспекте Вернадского) is an auditorium in Moscow located at the Vernadsky Prospekt. It was opened 30 April 1971. It can seat up to 3,400 people and the height of the amphitheatre is 36 metres. Performances are held each day in the afternoon and evening.

The circus building has 5 arenas (equestrian, water, illusionist, ice rink, and light-effect), located 18 metres below the floor, which can be swapped during the performance.

Initially, the circus building was merely a performance venue. In the early 1990s its own company was formed. It is headed by Leonid Kostyuk, a former circus artist and equilibrist. The former organiser of circuses in Soviet Russia was Soyuz Gost-Cirk (loosely translated as Russian People's Circus). Thousands of performers worked for the circus organisation.

The present company employs several hundred performers and tours as the "Great Moscow State Circus".

The Moscow State Circus is a state-owned enterprise. The circus organisation was threatened by the dismantling of the Soviet Union, and by some performers' inclination to seek better-paid foreign contracts. In June 2007, an attempt to privatise the building was initiated, strongly opposed by company director Leonid Kostyuk, among many others. Eventually President Vladimir Putin eliminated the building from the list of state properties to be privatised.

== United Kingdom ==
The name Moscow State Circus has long been used by troupes of Russian circus performers in the West.

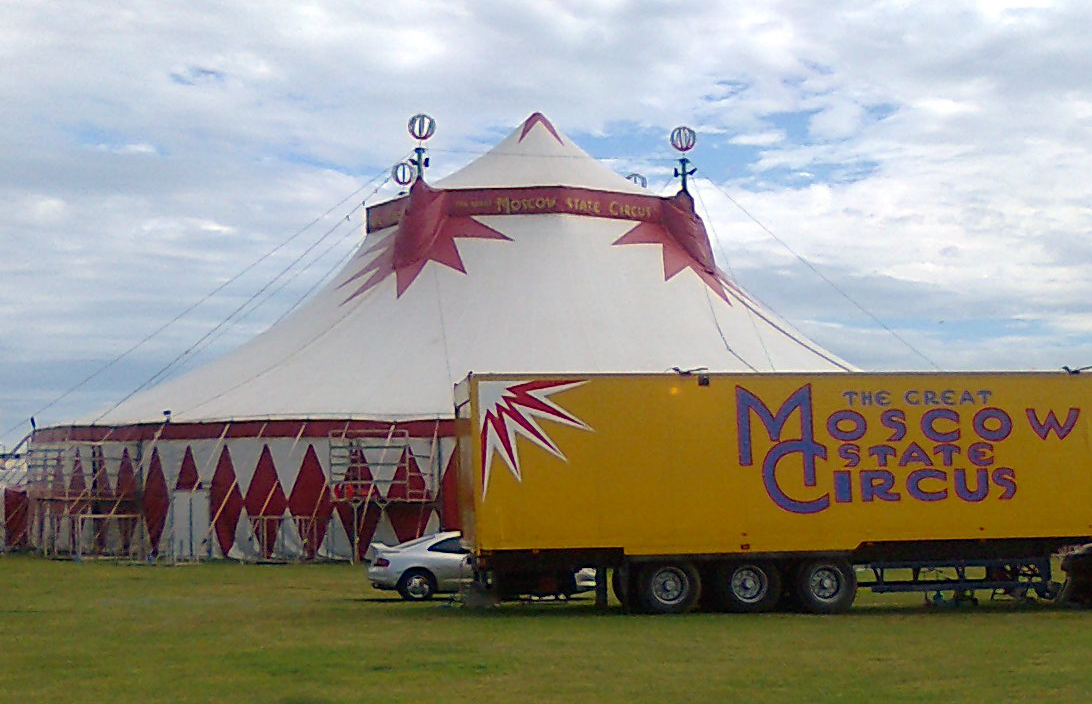
Moscow State Circus big top, UK, 2012

Such a tour is currently being promoted and produced in the United Kingdom by The Extreme Stunts Show ltd., a company formed for this specific purpose. Until 2017 was promoted and produced by in the United Kingdom by The European Events Corporation. Since 1995, individual artistes have been able to take advantage of new post-Soviet freedoms to agree to terms and travel abroad. The current production, which began touring in April 2011, is entitled Babushkin Sekret ('Grandmother's secret') and is themed around the Russian story of The Twelve Chairs. There is a cast of twenty-seven performers, including clowns, acrobats and jugglers, and the show features a wide variety of acts that involve perch pole, static trapeze, aerial silk, chinese pole, and high wire techniques. The show climaxes with a spectacular chair balancing act involving a tower of chairs approximately 10 metres high.

== Australia ==
The Great Moscow Circus has been touring Australian country towns for 50 years, made up of International performers and Australian performers and crew.

The Australian 'Great Moscow Circus' went into liquidation on 14 March 2017, stranding international performers in Australia.

== See also ==
- Moscow Circus on Tsvetnoy Boulevard
- Stella and Aileen:Fictional Characters
