= Danish pole =

Circus prop

A Danish pole is a circus prop, consisting of a wooden pole about 4 metres long and with a 5 cm diameter. It is fastened to a turnable base on the bottom and to a rope on top. The rope can be slackened, causing the pole to hang at an angle and permitting the artists to swing the pole around the base and do acrobatics on it while it turns. The rope can also be tightened, causing the pole to stand directly up in the air and allowing the artists to do more traditional pole acrobatics.

== History ==
The Danish pole is a relatively new circus prop, invented by the Danish artist Anders Jensen Astrup.

It has been used in at least two contemporary circus shows: 99% Unknown by Cirkus Cirkör and Roundabout by Nova Exit.

== See also ==
- German wheel
- Chinese pole
