= The Flying Caceres =

The Flying Caceres was created by Miguel Caceres in 1982 for the 112th Edition of Ringling Bros. and Barnum & Bailey Circus. Both Miguel and his wife, Luz Caceres, were flying trapeze artists from Colombia, South America. They came to the United States on a contract for Ringling Bros. and Barnum & Bailey Circus in the 1970s. Miguel worked with Ringling Bros. and Barnum & Bailey Circus for many years before forming The Flying Caceres in 1982.

He was the first person in the world to ever catch a "Triple Somersault" and a "Triple and a half Somersault" consecutively in a single performance.

Miguel's son, George Caceres, now carries The Flying Caceres name and toured with "The Greatest Show on Earth" with his Double-Decker Flying Trapeze act from 2008 to 2013.

The Flying Caceres are the only Colombian flying trapeze troupe to have ever been invited to the prestigious International Circus Festival in Monte Carlo, Monaco.

The troupe also made history by successfully catching the "quad" during the 140th edition of Ringling Brothers and Barnum & Bailey Circus Barnum's FUNundrum! in 2010.

Miguel's daughter, Krizia Carr, created her own flying trapeze troupe called Coquette; the world's first and only all-female flying trapeze troupe.
