= General fitness training =

Exercise for health and wellbeing

General fitness training works towards broad goals of overall health and well-being, rather than narrow goals of sport competition, larger muscles, or concerns over appearance. A regular moderate workout regimen and healthy diet can improve general appearance markers of good health such as muscle tone, healthy skin, hair, and nails, while preventing age or lifestyle-related reductions in health and the series of heart and organ failures that accompany inactivity and poor diet.

Diet itself helps to increase calorie burning by boosting metabolism, a process further enhanced while gaining more lean muscle. An aerobic exercise program can burn fat and increase the metabolic rate.

== General Fitness ==
There are many benefits to increasing one’s general fitness level, such as a reduction in stress, to feel better, a decreased likelihood of contracting many cardiovascular diseases, etc. Implementing or emphasizing an increased consistent level of physical activity is a surefire way to increase general fitness levels. The amount that one must be active and in doing what varies from person to person; for example, LeBron James has a much different training regimen than Judge Judy.

There are also many ways to decrease one’s general fitness level. Injury, stress, tragedy, all of these can cause one to become less active and decrease your body’s BMR. A general reduction in physical activity will also absolutely cause a decrease in general fitness.

== Diet ==
Diet itself helps to increase calorie burning by boosting metabolism, a process further enhanced while gaining more lean muscle. An aerobic exercise program can burn fat and increase the basal metabolic rate (BMR) in obese adults, studies show that through proper diet over the span of 6 months in obese adults has shown a positive correlation in fitness and mood, as well as a weight loss average of over 27.5% Studies also show reduced level of hunger and several other symptoms, such as inability to get up in the morning and frequent anxiety.

== Fitness and Mental Stability ==
Physical fitness and mental stability go hand in hand, as research suggests that although physical and aerobic activity improves one's physical capabilities, it also helps with one's positive body image and self-esteem. Studies show that physical fitness helps improve positive body image and self esteem, perceivable increased stress management, reduction of depression and anxiety, as well as enhance mood states and overall cognitive function. This all further shows the importance behind the usage of physical fitness for mental stability and why it is so important to engage in the practice of it.

== Weight loss and Muscle Definition ==
General fitness training may be used to promote weight loss. Personal trainers construct a program centered on restructuring lifestyle while helping to provide the necessary motivation for its success.

General fitness training can also be used to promote toning or building of muscles, which are essentially the same physiological process. (However, 'toning' implies moderate muscle definition, whereas 'building' implies increasing musculature significantly.)

The definition of weight loss is losing as much as or more than 3% body weight, although there is no completely defined definition as to what weight loss is, as one must take into account expert opinion, body type, previous study precedents, and normal weight fluctuations.

== COVID-19 ==
General fitness training can improve immune response and strengthen the body's natural defenses against COVID-19 and other viruses.

== More Specialized Fitness Training ==
=== Sports-Specific Training ===
Sports-specific trainers can help improve strength, flexibility and stamina to improve performance in specific sports. Options include increasing arm strength for tennis playing or improving strength and core stability, providing better balance while playing golf.

Sports-specific training is all about developing physical conditions to improve performance and skills at a particular sport. Also, understanding the needs of the game, training/practicing at the correct pace, in order to meet sports requirements.

Injury recovery

Certified personal trainers can contribute significantly and uniquely to recovery and rehabilitation efforts. But personal trainers mainly pick up where physical therapy leaves off.

=== Prenatal and Postpartum Training ===
During a pregnancy period, a lot of stress is put on the muscle on the lower back due to the heavy weight being carried. Exercise and stretching can be extremely important to increase strength and reinforce the body structure for the extra weight.

During the second trimester (weeks 13-28), the unpleasant symptoms from the first trimester should have settled down, and the mother will start to feel a renewed level of energy. The biggest change during this period will be the growth of the 'bump'. As the baby grows, the mother should notice a change in her body position and posture. The extra weight occurs at the front of the body, and the hip and back joints will take the strain. The posture will shift as the lower back muscles tighten and take an exaggerated curvature. The abdominal muscles will stretch and strain to adapt to the growing baby. During this time, it will be extremely beneficial to perform exercises to help strengthen weakened abdominal and pelvic floor muscles, in order to reduce the strain on the lower back.

== See also ==
- Dieting
- Exercise physiology
- Exercise
- Health
- Kinesiology
- Neurobiological effects of physical exercise
- Physical exercise
- Physical fitness
- Power training
- Social influences on fitness behavior
- Split weight training
- Strength training
- Training Split
- Weight training
