= Texteline =

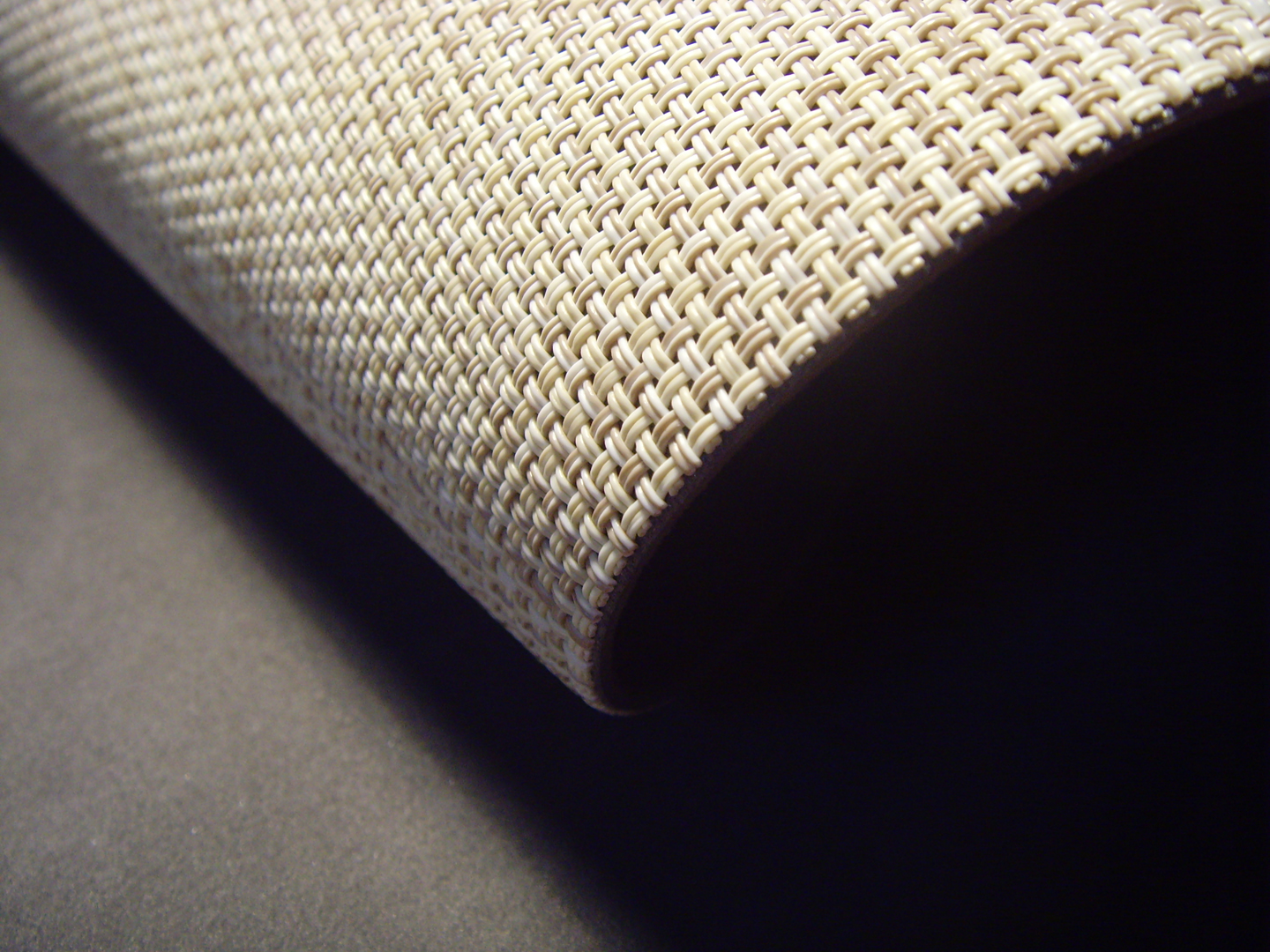
Textilene with EVA backing

Texteline (or Textoline) is a generic term for synthetic fabrics, used instead of deposed marks such as TEXTILENE® of Twitchell Corporation.

Texteline are high strength polyesters with PVC compound. They are often used in outdoor and garden furnitures due to UV resistance, comfort and ease of cleaning.
