= Cloud swing =

Aerial act

The cloud swing is an aerial act that usually combines static and swinging trapeze skills, drops, holds and rebound lifts.

The apparatus itself is a soft rope about 25-30mm thick. It can be made from a single rope, or from a cotton-filled sheath. On its simplest level the cloud swing resembles a Spanish web in length and width, with each end braided and spliced-lashed with a thimble, forming a loop. Two high-caliber swivels are required to support the weight; the swivels are anchored to a crane bar or a stationary rig, with the swing itself hanging in a "V" shape. Generally, the motion provided to swing the performer is supplied by an assistant pulling on a tether at the bottom of the "V".

The cloud swing is a relatively new apparatus, and many of the figures performed on it are borrowed or adapted from static and swinging trapeze.

The "Mexican cloud swing" or corde volante is performed at higher altitude.

A cloud swing act was featured in the Cirque du Soleil touring production Quidam.
