= Cradle (circus act) =

Aerial circus act

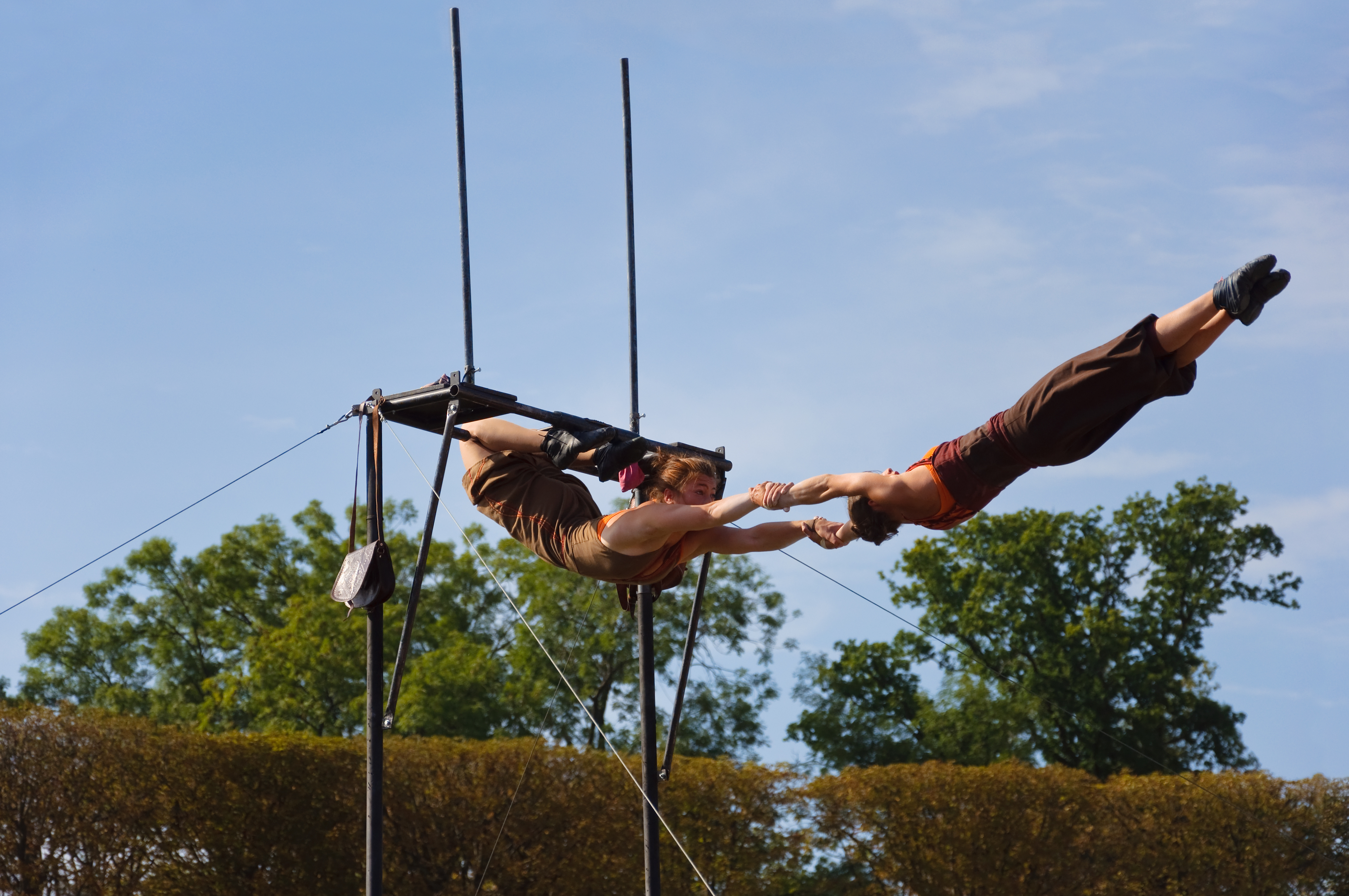
Aerial cradle performance by the compagnie Kaoukafela during an open air festival in France.

The cradle (also known as aerial cradle or casting cradle) is a type of aerial circus act in which a performer hangs by their knees from a large rectangular frame and swings, tosses, and catches another performer. The aerialist being swung is referred to as a flyer, while the one doing the tossing and catching is referred to as a catcher or caster. The flyer usually starts and ends standing on the frame above the catcher. The flyer swings holding on to the catcher's hands, performs releases at the top of the swing, and is re-caught in mid-air.

The frame can be static or swinging. A variant called the Russian cradle or Korean cradle has the catcher/caster standing, secured by a safety belt.

This type of aerial performance has been used in many circuses, both in "big tops" and on stage, including by Cirque du Soleil and the Moscow State Circus.

== See also ==
- Static trapeze
- https://www.cirquedusoleil.com
- https://www.knie.ch/circus/
- https://www.montecarlofestival.mc
