= Trapeze =

Aerial circus or gymnastics apparatus

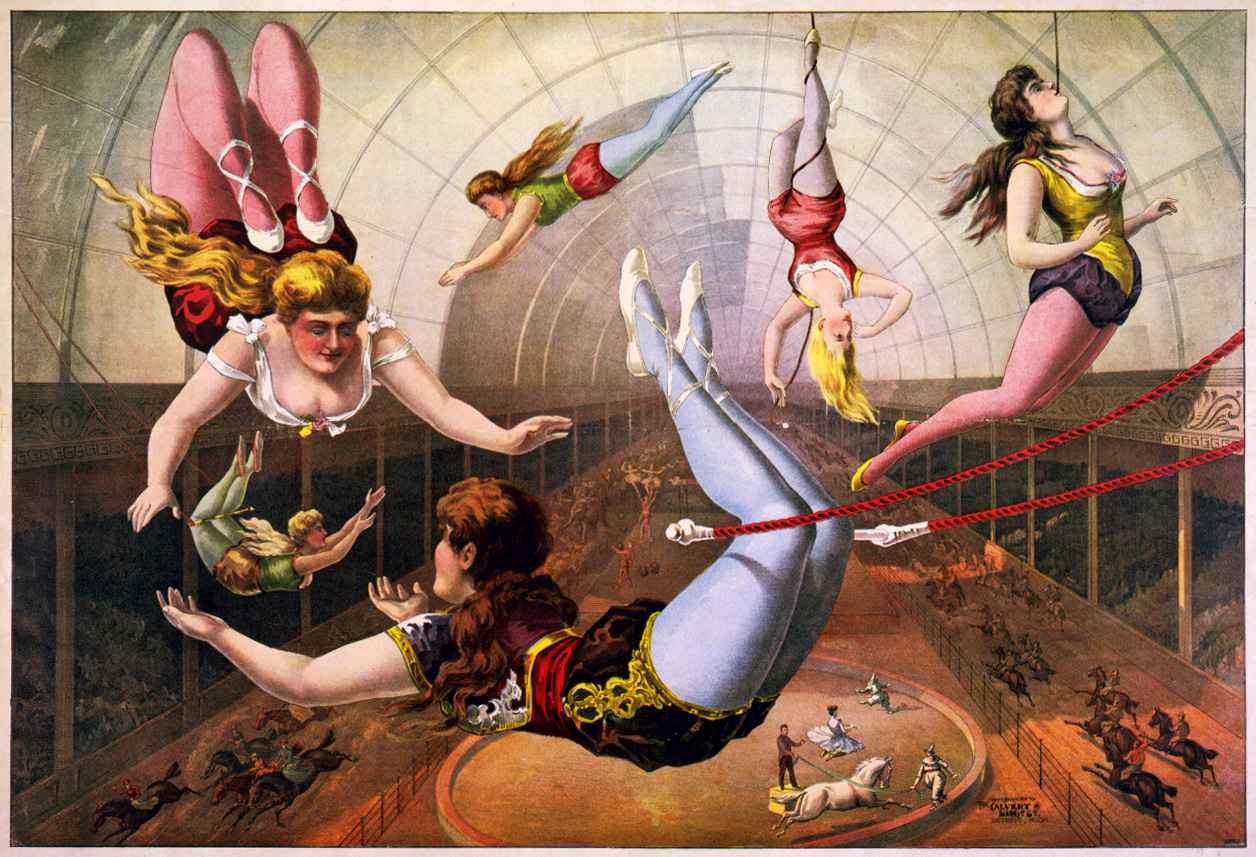
Trapeze artists, in lithograph by Calvert Litho. Co., 1890.

A trapeze is a short horizontal bar hung by ropes, metal straps, or chains, from a ceiling support. It is an aerial apparatus commonly found in circus performances. Trapeze acts may be static, spinning (rigged from a single point), swinging or flying, and may be performed solo, double, triple or as a group act.

The name of the apparatus reflects the trapezoid shape made by the horizontal bar, ropes and ceiling support.

== History ==
The art of trapeze performance is reported to have been developed by Jules Léotard, a young French acrobat and aerialist, in Toulouse in the mid-19th century. He is said to have used his father's swimming pool to practice. However, the name "trapeze" can be found in books dating as far back as twenty years earlier, before Léotard was born. One such example is George Roland's “An Introductory Course of Modern Gymnastic Exercises”, published in 1832. Roland proposes the idea that the trapeze might owe its origin to Colonel Amoros, but ultimately deems the question of origin "unimportant to the present subject".

The name was applied in French (trapèze) from the resemblance of the apparatus to a trapezium or irregular four-sided figure.

== Types of trapeze ==
- Static trapeze refers to a trapeze act in which the performer moves around the bar and ropes, performing a wide range of movements including balances, drops, hangs while the bar itself stays generally static. The difficulty on a static trapeze is making every move look effortless. It is like dance, in that most people of a reasonable level of strength can get onto the trapeze bar for the first time and perform some basic tricks, but an experienced artist will do them with much more grace and style.
- Swinging trapeze (or swinging single trapeze) refers to an act performed on a trapeze swinging in a forward–backward motion. The performer builds up swing from a still position, and uses the momentum of the swing to execute the tricks. Usually tricks on a swinging trapeze are thrown on the peaks of the swing and involve dynamic movements that require precise timing. Most of the tricks begin with the performer sitting or standing on the bar and end with the performer catching the bar in his/her hands or in an ankle hang (hanging by the ankles by bracing them between the rope and the bar). This act requires a great deal of strength, grace, and flexibility. The trapeze bar is weighted and often has cable inside the supporting ropes for extra strength to withstand the dynamic forces of the swing.
- Flying trapeze refers to a trapeze act where a performer, or "flier," grabs the trapeze bar and jumps off a high platform, or pedestal board, so that gravity creates the swing. The flying trapeze optimizes pendulum physics to create height and momentum. The swing's parts are the "force out" (sometimes called the "cast out") at the far end of the first swing, the "hollow" a small kick forward to iniate the beat back and the rise (also known as "seven") as the performer swings back above the pedestal board, and then the trick is thrown at the far end of the second swing. The performer often releases the bar and is caught by another performer, the "catcher," who hangs by their knees on another trapeze, or sometimes on a cradle, which can be either stationary or also swinging. People of any size are able to execute basic trapeze maneuvers. Flying trapeze is generally done over a net, or occasionally over water. However, some smaller rigs, usually created for teaching purposes, use mats instead of a net.

In the UK, many outdoor education centres offer an activity known as 'leap of faith'. This activity invites participants to climb to the top of a narrow pole and jump, arms outstretched, to grab a trapeze bar. Similar to the flying trapeze, gravity creates the swing. In this type of activity, participants are attached via rope and harness and an added challenge to get your legs over the trapeze can be included.

- Washington trapeze (also known as head trapeze or heavy trapeze) refers to a variation on static and swinging trapeze where the aerialist performs various headstand skills on the bar, which is typically much heavier than a normal trapeze bar and has a small (about 4-inch round) headstand platform on it. The trapeze is supported by wire cables rather than ropes, and the apparatus will often be lifted and lowered during the act.
- Dance trapeze (also known as single-point trapeze) refers to a trapeze used by many modern dance companies in aerial dance. The ropes of the trapeze are often both attached to a single swivel, allowing the trapeze to spin in either small or large circles.
- Double trapeze (also known as the French trapeze) is a variation on the static trapeze, and features two performers working together on the same trapeze to perform figures and bear each other's weight. It can also be performed swinging, in which case the act is called swinging double trapeze.

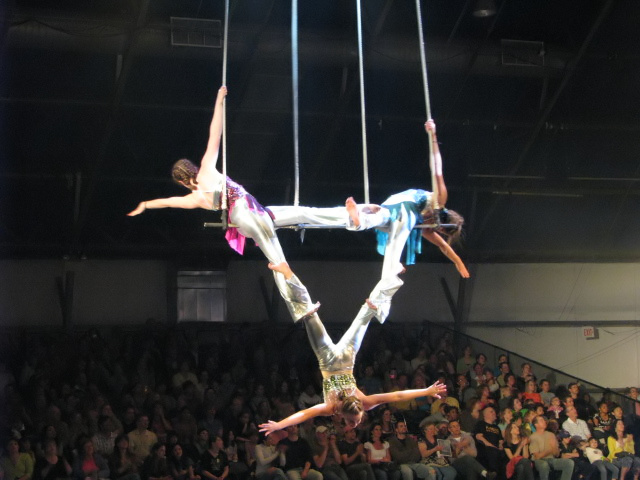
Triple trapeze

- Multiple trapeze refers to a number of different shapes and sizes of trapeze, including double trapeze, triple trapeze and larger multiples designed for use by multiple simultaneous flyers.
- Shaped trapezes are apparatuses that can take virtually any shape imaginable.
- Duplex trapeze refers to any trapeze with two layers of hand bars, one on top of the other, such that acrobats can jump from the upper bar and land (or be caught by a catcher) on the lower.
