= Perch (equilibristic) =

Equilibristic balancing act

The perch is an equilibristic balancing act where one performer balances atop a pole that is being balanced by another performer. Each perch pole has a loop at the top into which the performer may insert either a hand or a foot in order to perform a variety of tricks while hanging down from the loop. During the whole routine, the base at the bottom must balance the pole as the flier shifts their weight from one position to another, climbs up and down, and balances at the top.

== Types of perch pole ==
There are several variations on the perch pole. They include:

- Balancing perch pole
- Swing or swinging perch pole
- Hanging perch pole
- Standing perch pole

=== Balancing perch pole ===
The balancing perch pole consists of a tall steel pole (about 25 feet high and weighing about 50 pounds) with interchangeable top and bottom pieces, which are designed for variations of the act. The standard bottom piece is designed for a person to balance the pole on his shoulders and contains grips for holding the pole with his hands, while a substitute bottom piece may be used for a performer who wishes to balance the pole on his head.

=== Swing or swinging perch pole ===
The swing pole is an act where one performer holds up a steel pole about twenty feet long as their partner climbs to the top. After the flier fastens themselves to the top of the pole with a neck loop, he spins the pole around as fast as possible until the flier is swinging out almost parallel to the ground.

=== Hanging perch pole ===
The hanging perch is a variation on the perch where the pole is hung from an aerial mount point, and a pair of fliers perform tricks and stunts from the pole. Usually this includes the base being supported by an ankle strap on the pole. This allows him or her to stand out on the pole and hold a flyer while he/she performs various acrobatic maneuvers.

=== Standing perch pole ===
The standing perch pole is similar to the hanging perch pole but is fastened to the ground by three or four thick cords. Performers can climb and do tricks they could not normally do on any other variant. Standing perch poles come in various sizes. Diagram:

    /||\
   / || \
  /  ||  \
_/  _||_  \_

== Perch pole tricks ==
Usual tricks include:

- Standouts (the flier braces both feet against the pole and stands out sideways from the pole)
- Leg drops (the flier braces her hands against the pole while hanging from one foot, then lowers her other leg out straight behind her)
- Arabesques
- Headstands
- Leg lifts

== See also ==
- Chinese pole
- Mallakhamb
