= Flying trapeze =

Aerial circus performing act

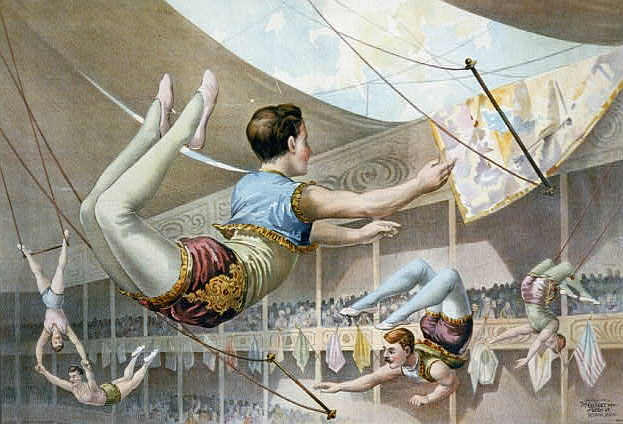
Flying trapeze artists

The flying trapeze is a specific form of the trapeze in which a performer jumps from a platform with the trapeze so that gravity makes the trapeze swing.

The performance was invented in 1859 by a Frenchman named Jules Léotard, who connected a bar to some ventilator cords above the swimming pool in his father's gymnasium in Toulouse, France. After practicing tricks above the pool, Leotard performed his act in the Cirque Napoleon (now known as the Cirque d'hiver). The traditional flier's costume, the leotard, is named after him.

== Trapeze acts ==
In a traditional flying trapeze act, flyers mount a narrow board (usually by climbing a tall ladder) and take off from the board on the fly bar. For a trick involving a catch, the flyer must wait for a call from the catcher to make sure they leave at the correct time. Otherwise, the catcher will not be close enough to the flyer to make a successful catch. The flier then performs one of many aerial tricks and is caught by the catcher, who is swinging from a separate catch bar. Once in the catcher's hands, the flyer continues to swing and is thrust back toward the fly bar in a maneuver called a "return". A return could consist of some kind of twist back to the bar, an "angel" (when the catcher holds the flyer by the feet and one arm), or any other trick that a flyer can think of to get back to the bar. Once back to the fly bar, the flyer can return to the board, and another flyer takes a turn.

=== Variations ===
Although many people define a flying trapeze act as an act involving two trapezes and a catcher, as of 2008, many innovative styles of flying trapeze have been performed in circuses all over the world, such as Cirque Du Soleil, The Flying Farfans, and The Flying Caceres. Cirque Du Soleil's La Nouba features a bar-to-bar flying trapeze act, and Cirque Du Soleil's Corteo presents a high-flying act quite similar to flying trapeze, but without bars. The flyers fly from one catcher to another in an innovative adagio-influenced aerial act. Still other flying trapeze acts focus on high-flying aerial tricks from the flyers, but perform their release tricks to the net, rather than to catchers. Also, some flying trapeze acts have other equipment (which includes 2 Russian swings, with one for the swinging catcher and the other one below the fliers' pedestal, a Korean cradle above the catcher, and a static cradle above the flyers' pedestal), along with the traditional fly bar and catcher method.

== Safety ==
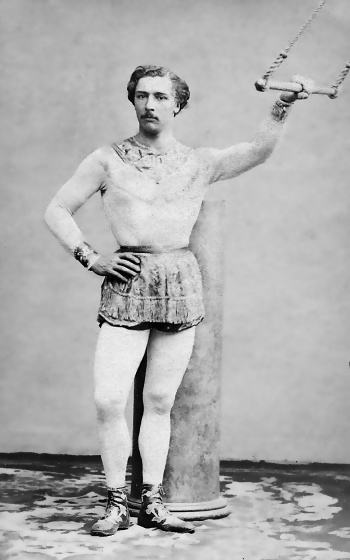
Jules Léotard, inventor of the flying trapeze

In the early years of young Mr. Léotard's performances, the flying trapeze did not have the safety net as is typically seen today. He would perform over a series of mattresses on a raised runway to give the audience a better view of his tricks, or "passes".

Most modern flyers start out wearing a safety harness, while a trainer on the ground controls the lines and would pull them if the flyer is in a dangerous situation. Pulling on the lines will suspend the flyer in the air, and letting go of the lines slowly will bring the flyer to the ground safely. Once a flyer has mastered a particular trick, they will take off the safety harness. Every safe flying trapeze rig has a large net underneath the rig. Many flyers in the circus do not start out using safety belts. Those flyers who are not wearing safety harnesses learn how to fall safely into the net in case they miss a catch or unexpectedly fall off the bar or off the catcher.

Several risky flying trapeze acts have been performed without safety nets in earlier circus days, but it would be rare to find this kind of act today, as most flying trapeze acts are performed between 20 and 40 feet above the ground.

== Terminology ==
- Hup - Signal to leave the board and/or the fly bar. Sometimes used by the catcher to tell the flyer to let go after a catch when landing in the net.
- Catch Bar - The trapeze that the catcher swings on.
- Fly Bar - The bar the flyer uses.
- Apron - The net in front of the catch bar. (The back apron is the net in back of the board.)
- Rise/Riser - A narrow board placed on the rungs of the ladder to allow the flyer to take off from a higher point.
- Mount - When the flyer mounts the board after a return.
- Return - When the flyer, after a successful catch, manages to return to the fly bar, and often all the way back to the board. In professional shows, the flyers rarely come down from the board.
- Grips - Can be gymnastics grips or ones made out of tape. They are used to protect the flyer's hands.
- Chalk - Used by the flyer and catcher to absorb wetness and to reduce sticking to things such as the fly bar.
- Force Out - Kicking the legs out at the peak of the flyer's swing to gain height.
- Hollow - Comes right after the force-out. It is basically a neutral position.
- Sweep - Comes after "hollow". Signifies kicking the legs back.
- Seven - The last part of a force-out swing. Flyer brings legs in front of them so they will not hit the board.
- Cutaway Bar - The bar that the catcher holds when the flyer executes tricks to the catcher such as normal Cutaways and Reverse Knee-Hangs.
- Cut (as in Cut Catch) - The flyer is caught in a legs catch and swings out into the apron. On the next swing into the apron, the flyer thrusts their body up, and the catcher lets go of the flyer's legs and grabs their hands.

== Tricks ==
Below is a list of flying trapeze tricks that can be thrown to a catcher:

- Feet Across (a.k.a. "Legs")
- Heels Off
- Hocks Off
- Splits (Front End/Back End)
- Straddle Whip (Front End/Back End)
- Whip (Front End/Back End)
- Bird's Nest/Birdie (Front End/Back End)
- Shooting Star
- Half Turn
- Straight Jump
- Cut Catch
- Uprise Shoot
- Forward Over
- Forward Under
- Double Over
- Passing Leap
- Piggyback
- Pullover Shoot
- Reverse Knee Hang
- One Knee Hang
- Flexus
- Somersault
- Hocks Salto
- Front Hip Circle/Back Hip Circle
- Seat Roll/Penny Roll (Full Time/Half Time)
- Planche (Front End/Back End)
- Pirouette (540)
- Layout
- One and a half Somersault
- Cutaway
- Cutaway Half
- Cutaway Full
- Double Somersault
- Double Cutaway
- Double Cutaway and a half twist
- Double Layout
- Full Twisting Double
- Double-Double
- Triple Somersault
- Triple Twisting Double
- Full Twisting Triple
- Triple Twisting Double
- Triple Layout
- Quadruple Somersault

These are tricks performed bar to bar:

- Hocks Off
- Splits (Front End/Back End)
- Straddle Whip (Front End/Back End)
- Whip (Front End/Back End)
- Bird's Nest/Birdie (Front End/Back End)
- Half Turn
- Straight Jump
- Planche (Front End/Back End)
- Layout
- Double Somersault

These are tricks that can be performed without a catcher:

- Salute
- Half Turn
- Force Out Turn Around
- Back Mount
- Suicide
- Reverse Suicide
- Pirouette

Returns:

- Half Turn
- Flexus
- Birdie
- Legs (Twist one direction to grab the bar.)
- Angel (1 or 2 legs)
- Pirouette (540)
