= Krzysztof Soroczyński =

Polish artist

- Born: April 30, 1955 (age 70); Drezdenko, Poland
- Occupations: Circus Trainer; Talent Scout; Circus Casting Expert; Acrobatic Performance Designer
- Children: Bartlomiej (Bartek) Soroczyński

Krzysztof Soroczyński (born 30 April 1955) is an artist, performer, trainer, and designer who works in the circus industry. Soroczyński has been involved in the circus arts for almost five decades. He has worked with many companies, including Cirque du Soleil and Cirque Éloize and has collaborated with many people, including directors Franco Dragone and Daniele Finzi Pasca.

== Europe: Traditional Circus ==
=== Early childhood ===
Soroczyński was born in Poland on April 30, 1955. He first attended a circus at the age of nine when a traditional circus installed its big top tent at the marketplace in Gorlice, Poland. In his memoir, Soroczyński described how this first encounter with the circus ignited a passion that never left him.

=== Career beginnings ===
Soroczyński began his acrobatic career in 1965, with training in sports acrobatics. In 1977, he completed a degree in circus arts at the Polish State Circus Academy in Julinek. He worked in traditional circuses around the world (including Poland, Austria, Italy, France and Russia), specializing in acrobatics and performing in Russian swing, banquine, aerial perch, hand to hand, teeter board, and single and triple Russian bar acts.

In 1980, he won a silver medal at the Festival Mondial du Cirque de Demain in Paris as part of the Budzyn Troupe, performing a Russian Swing act.

== Canada: Contemporary Circus (Cirque nouveau) ==
=== First contract with Cirque du Soleil ===
Soroczyński immigrated to Canada in 1983 with his wife, Teresa, and young son, Bartlomiej. They arrived in Winnipeg, a destination chosen for them by the Department of Citizenship and Immigration Canada. He became a naturalized Canadian citizen in 1987. Once in Canada, Soroczyński and his family began practicing aerial perch and hand-to-hand acts, and soon they were invited by Gilles Ste-Croix to audition as a family for Cirque du Soleil. The audition took place in Montreal on November 16, 1988. After a day of auditioning, Soroczyński, his wife, and Gilles Ste-Croix met with Louis Roy and Guy Laliberté, co-founder of Cirque du Soleil, and were signed on as members.

=== Becoming a coach ===
Cirque du Soleil moved the family to Montreal in January 1989, and they started rehearsing for the show "Le Cirque Réinventé". By the end of January, Soroczyński developed back problems, serious enough that the doctors discouraged acrobatic work. Soon Teresa's contract ended, and the couple was never able to perform on stage for Cirque du Soleil.

Unable to perform, but still under contract with Cirque du Soleil since he was on disability leave, Soroczyński looked for another role in the circus. In 1991, Jan-Rok Achard, Director of the National Circus School, designed a 35-week individual coach-training course for him.

Being the only expert in Montreal in disciplines like the Russian swing, he soon became an acrobatic consultant. He was head trainer for Cirque du Soleil for the shows Saltimbanco in 1992, Mystère in 1993, and Alegria in 1994, all directed by Franco Dragone. Saltimbanco and Algeria toured for more than 20 years, and Mystère is still playing in Las Vegas.

=== 1991: École de Cirque de Verdun ===
In 1991, Soroczyński was one of the founding members and the senior coach of the Ecole de Cirque de Verdun. This recreational school first welcomed the children of the neighborhood. Today, Soroczyński still works with some of the artists that he trained, who have become professional circus performers, such as Jean-Philippe Cuerrier, Nicolas Boivin-Gravel, and Samuel Roy.

=== 1993–2013: Cirque Éloize ===
Soroczyński joined Cirque Éloize on May 26, 1999, a company that successfully presented its shows in theater venues all over the world.

He started by developing acrobatic acts for the show, "Eccentrics", presented at the Edinburgh Fringe Festival. As head trainer and talent scout, he developed multidisciplinary troupes and improved the technical level of the company's shows. He designed acrobatic performances for the show "Cirque Orchestra" in 2001, as well as for the three shows that formed the "Sky Trilogy": "Nomade" in 2002, "Rain" in 2004, and "Nebbia" in 2007. These shows were directed by Daniele Finzi Pasca.

He took part in the creation of the show "iD" in 2009–2010, and created the show's unique moving trampowall act. In 2012, he was involved in the creation of "Cirkopolis", another Cirque Éloize show. It was awarded a Drama Desk Award in NYC in the category "Unique Theatrical Experience" in 2014.

As part of the creation team, Soroczyński developed new and unique acrobatic concepts. For example, in the show "Rain", he created the "monkey jump" where an artist is surprisingly ejected from a teeter board into the stage wings.

In 2008, the hand-to-hand duet, performed by Jacek Wyskup and Bartek Pankau, was discovered in Poland by Soroczyński. Wyskup and Pankaj were then trained at Cirque Éloize, won the Polish TV-show "Mam Talent!", and became the "Best Talent 2008." The duet was part of the show "Rain" for five years, thus increasing the respect for circus arts in their country.

=== Daniel Cyr and the Cyr wheel ===
Soroczyński met Daniel Cyr, Cirque Éloize co-founder and inventor of the Cyr wheel, in Montreal in 1989. While Cyr was still a student at the National Circus School, he worked at the front desk of Cirque du Soleil's rehearsal venue, and welcomed the Soroczynski family when they arrived for their first day of training.

While at Cirque Éloize, Soroczynski witnessed the development of the "Cyr wheel" by Daniel Cyr. He observed the creation of both the acrobatic movements necessary for the new apparatus, as well as the construction in sections so it could be easily transported. In 2006, Soroczynski coached Daniel Cyr and Irina Burliy for the first Cyr wheel duo that was supposed to compete at the Festival Mondial du Cirque de Demain in 2007, but was finally never presented to an audience.

=== Other accomplishments ===
In 2006, accompanied by his son Bartek, Soroczynski was a trainer for "ArtCirq – Arctic Circus" in Igloolik (Nunavut), Canada. ArtCirq is a socially-driven project to fight against depression and the high suicide rate amongst the Inuit youth. The goal was to allow them to express their creativity while at the same time confronting them with new challenges.

In October 2013, the Canadian Russian Cradle Act, "Chilly and Fly", formed by Emilie Fournier and Alexandre Lane and trained by Soroczynski, won the French TF1 TV show The Best, le meilleur artiste 2013 in Paris. This show is said to be "the largest competition of artists ever organized", offering a 100,000 Euro Grand Prize.

In recognition of his expertise in circus arts, he is regularly invited to be on the jury at talent festivals around the world, including the SOLyCIRCO Festival in Sylt, Germany (2011, 2012, and 2013), and the Festival International de Cirque Vaudreuil-Dorion in Quebec, Canada (2012 and 2013).

=== His son, Bartlomiej (Bartek) Soroczynski ===
Soroczynski closely mentored his own son, Bartlomiej. Though training him as a child in the circus arts, he made sure his son stayed open to other art forms, like dancing, playing music, and acting. After his graduation from secondary school, Bartlomiej attended the National Circus School in Montreal, where he specialized in two disciplines: clown and unicycle.

After completing circus school, he performed the leading role in the show "Nomade – At night, the sky is endless", with Cirque Éloize for nearly five years. Bartlomiej has achieved international acclaim, and is a circus artist and theatrical actor.

== A Circus Professional ==
Soroczynski has worked with more than 400 artists from different backgrounds and nationalities. He uses this expertise to build strong, interdisciplinary teams and to help each artist achieve their best performances.

In his career summary, Soroczynski writes: "After all these years, I feel like I didn't choose to do circus, circus chose me. I strongly believe that circus arts are undoubtedly one of the most widely shared cultural treasures on this planet. My goal is to be successful doing something I love that helps encourage research and development of new forms of circus expression. To achieve that goal, I will never stop learning, growing, changing or giving of myself."

As a passionate circus lover, Soroczynski also owns a collection of circus related items, including the most complete and rare collection of circus postage stamps. He is considered to be "one of the most important figures in the world of circus", according to Jacek Cieślak.

== Collaborating Artists ==
The performers that Soroczynski has worked with include:

- Josianne Levasseur, one of "the best multi-talented female circus performers he has worked with"
- Stéphane Drouard, one of "the best multi-talented male circus performers he has worked with"
- Jean-Philippe, Cuerrier, Nicolas Boivin-Gravel, Samuel Roy, who all started training at the École de Cirque de Verdun and graduated from the National Circus School
- Gypsy Snider, co-Founder of the Seven Doigts de la Main Company
- Antoine Carabinier, Founder of Cirque Alfonse
- Yamoussa Bangoura, Founder of Productions Kalabante
- Mathieu Laplante, Michael Rice, Jonas Woolverton, Krin Haglund, Pawel and Witek Biegaj, Eli Skoczylas, Zdzislaw Palka
