= Sarah Louis-Jean =

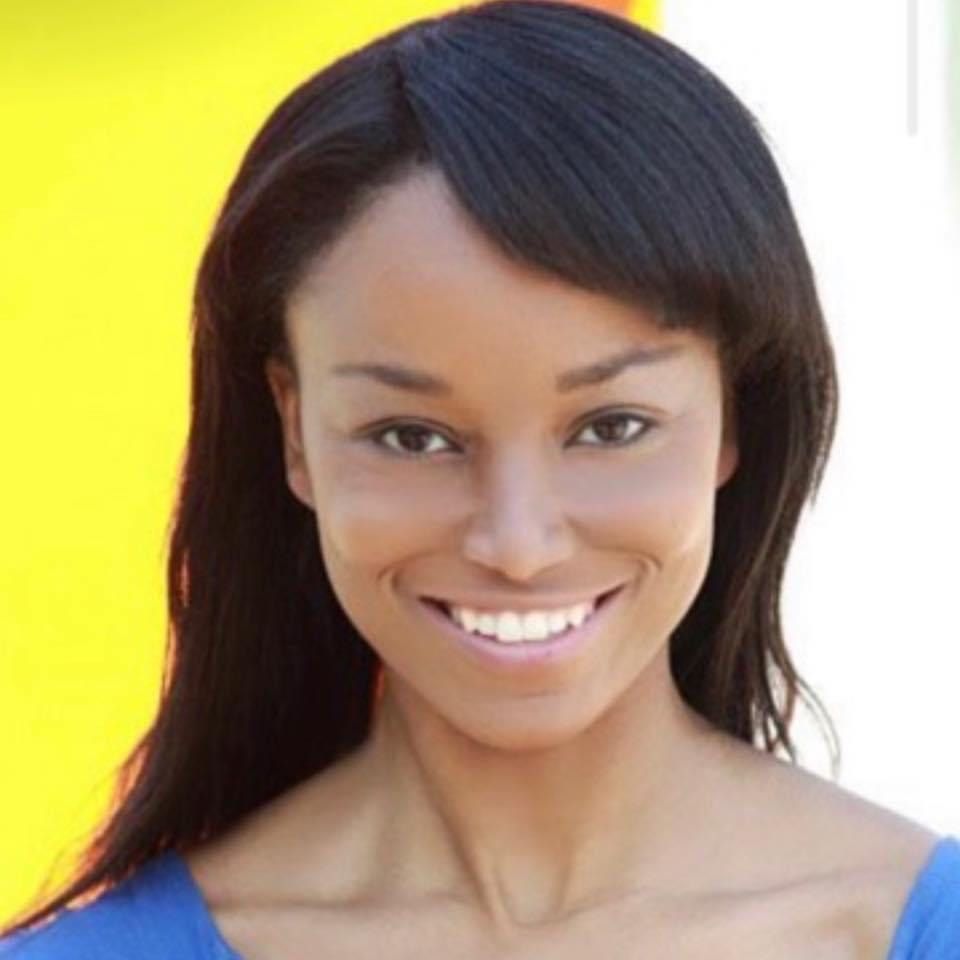
- Born: Montréal
- Education: École nationale de cirque
- Known for: Artiste de cirque
- Notable work: Artistic coach, circus artist, stunt performer, dancer and actress
- Movement: Union des artistes, En piste, Regroupement québécois de la danse
- Website: http://www.sarahlouisjean.com/

Sarah Louis-Jean is a Canadian circus artist born in Montréal. She specializes in boleadoras.

As a performance artist, she has worked in several countries and achieved international success. She also works as an artistic coach and singer.

In television and film, she works both as an actress and a circus artist, stunt performer, and dancer.

== Biography ==
Sarah Louis-Jean began practicing ballet at the age of 3 and continued her studies at the École supérieure de ballet du Québec and the National Ballet School of Canada. At a very young age, she danced in the production of The Nutcracker by Les Grands Ballets Canadiens.

In 2015, she studied at the École supérieure de théâtre musical in Montreal and participated in various camera acting workshops at the Ateliers Danielle Fichaud.

Over the years, Sarah Louis-Jean has studied several different dance styles, such as contemporary, jazz, hip hop, tap, flamenco, and more.

She delved into, among other places, the art of boleadoras during her training at the École nationale de cirque de Montréal, where she earned a degree in circus arts education.

Throughout her career as a professional artist, she has performed in front of audiences in various productions, including Best of Broadway, as well as Femmes au Casino de Montréal (including a special performance with Céline Dion), and at the opening ceremony of the Olympic Games in Vancouver. Sarah Louis-Jean has also been involved in research and creation with The 7 Fingers for the opening ceremonies of the Sochi Olympics. Additionally, she danced with the dance company Les Sortilèges for 3 years.

She has also worked in Germany with several organizations such as Cirque Roncalli and the KrystallPalast.

Moreover, she was employed by Cirque du Soleil as a dancer and boleadoras performer, as well as a coach and artistic director. Also, she could be seen performing as a boleadoras performer, notably with Cirque Éloize and at Dracula's Cabaret in Australia.

== Performances ==
- Cirque du Soleil
- Cirque Éloize, Les 3 Géants
- Cirque Éloize, in Dubai, Clé Dubai
- Cirque Roncalli, in Germany
- Internationales Variete Festival, in Germany
- Krystallpalast, in Germany, with the show "Boom!"
- Hansa-Theater, in Germany
- Best of Broadway, at the Tropicana Hotel in Atlantic City
- Doha Tennis Tournament, in Doha
- Opening ceremony of the 2010 Winter Olympic Games, in Vancouver
- Moonshine Follies, at Resorts Casino Hotel
- Montreal Jazz Festival
- Nuevo Arte Nativo, in Buenos Aires, in Argentina
- The Box, in London
- Sydney GPO, in Australia
- Dracula's Cabaret, in Australia

== Filmography ==
In addition to her professional performances in circus arts, Sarah Louis-Jean has also worked in television and film. Additionally, she has appeared in advertisements and performed as an artist and dancer in several TV shows.

=== Cinema ===
Film: 2015: N.O.I.R. - Sandra

=== Television ===
- 2010 : Échelle du talent
- 2021 : Talents bleus de la semaine des 4 Julie
- 2021-2022 : Chanteurs masqués
- 2021 : Cochon dingue
- 2021 : Au Suivant
- 2021 : Bye Bye 2021 : Woke
- 2021 : District 31 : Enquêteuse
- 2021 : L'Homme qui aimait trop : Préposée de chambre
- 2021 : Les Honorables II : Greffière
- 2021 : L'heure bleue : Béa
- 2021 : Une autre histoire : Cliente café
- 2021 : Un lien familial : Voyageuse
- 2022 : Alertes : Amanda Sabara
- 2022 : Génial

== Prix et distinctions ==
=== Record Guinness ===
On July 5, 2019, Sarah Louis-Jean achieved a record recognized by Guinness World Records for the most ground strikes with boleadoras in one minute.

By accomplishing this feat, Sarah Louis-Jean hopes to bring awareness to boleadoras and inspire many others to push their limits.

She also serves as one of the two official spokespersons for the 2020 edition of the Guinness World Records Tour, representing the book in which her record is listed.

As part of her spokesperson activities, she is interviewed on several television channels to announce the new edition of the Guinness World Records book. She can be seen on CTV News and Global News, among others.

=== Other Distinctions ===
- Australian's Circus Festival
- Mega Star Competition (3rd place)
- L'échelle du talent (2nd place)
- Talents bleus (finalist)
