= Cyr wheel =

Acrobatic apparatus

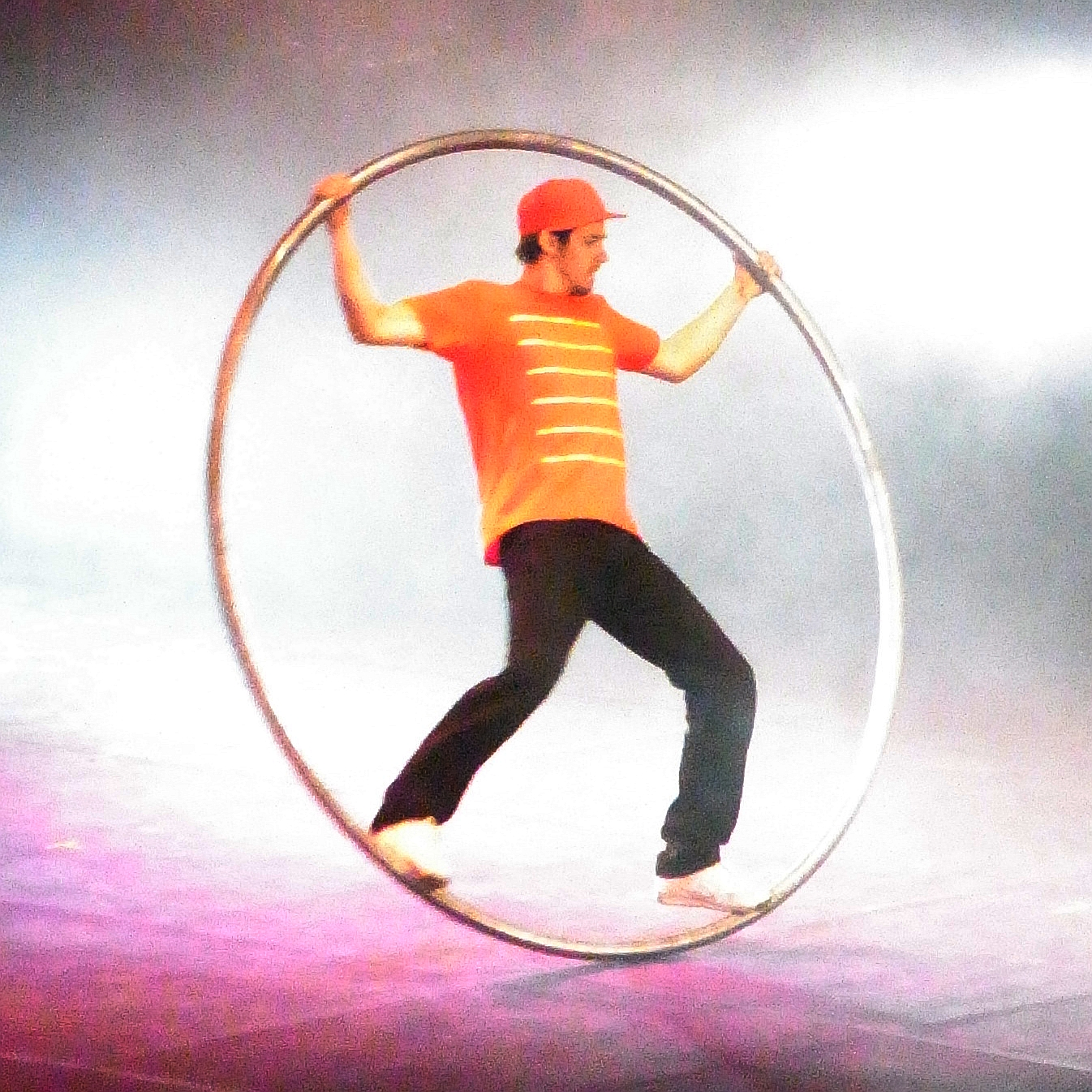
Urbanatix performer in Nordsternpark at Ruhr's 2011 ExtraSchicht festival

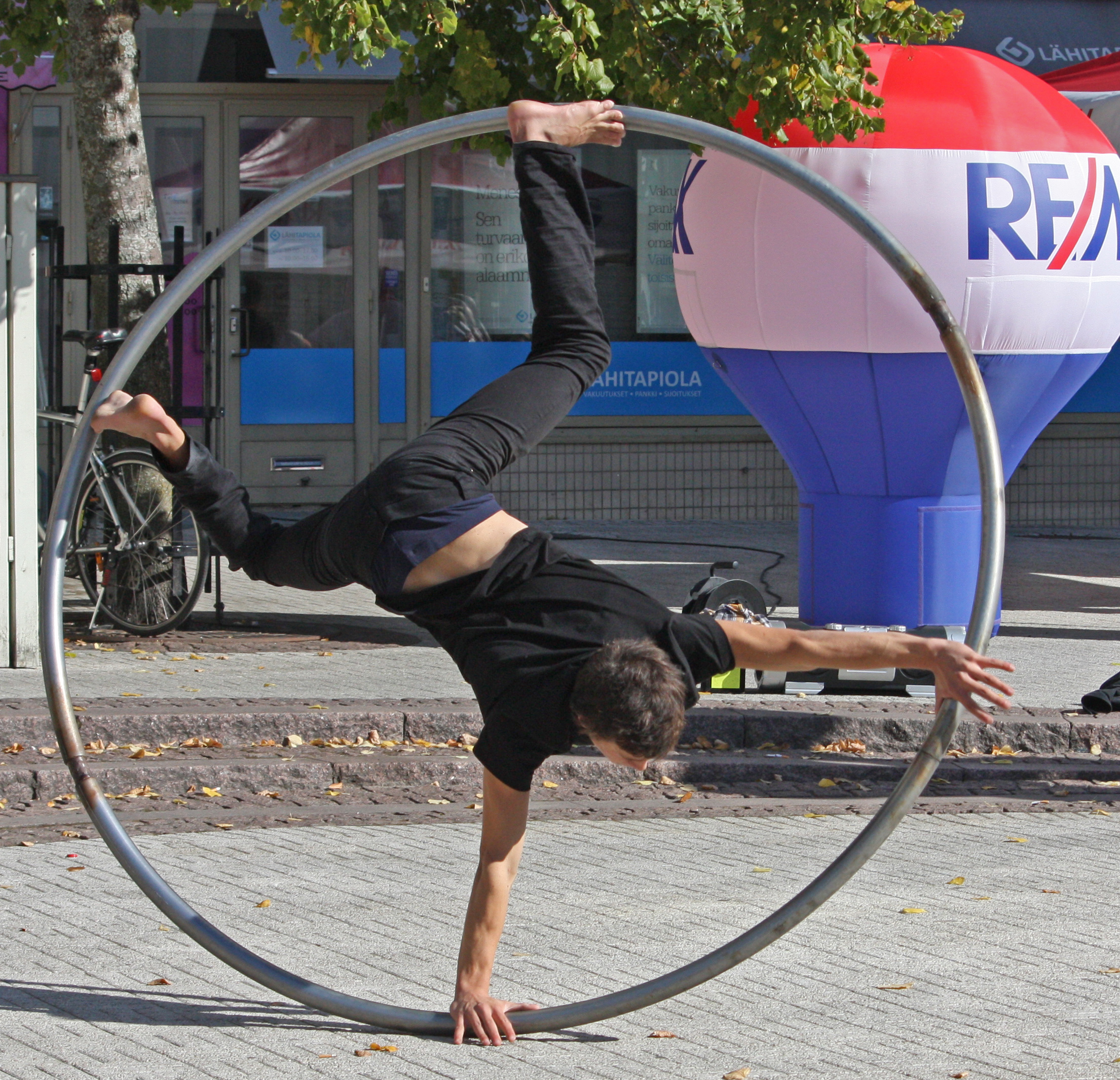
Street performer during Sirkusmarkkinat at Kerava in 2013 (Circus Festival)

The Cyr wheel (also known as the roue Cyr, mono wheel, or simple wheel) is an acrobatic apparatus that consists of a single large ring made of aluminum or steel with a diameter approximately 10 to 15 cm (4 to 6 in) taller than the performer. The performer stands inside the Cyr wheel and grasps its rim, causing it to roll and spin gyroscopically while performing acrobatic moves in and around the rotating wheel. The apparatus and its movement vocabulary have some similarities with the German wheel, but while the German wheel consists of two large rings linked together by horizontal crossbars and has handles for the performer to hold onto, the modern Cyr wheel consists of a single ring and has no handles. The Cyr wheel takes its name from Daniel Cyr, who revived its popularity, utilising it as a circus apparatus at the end of the 20th century.

Cyr wheel requires a solid, non-slippery surface such as a dance floor, concrete or stage and a relatively large performance area.

== Origin ==
There are records of people using a similar apparatus as sports equipment during the mid-20th century in Germany, where it was referred to as the Einreifen or mono wheel, having been developed by Adalbert von Rekowski as a variation on Otto Feick's popular Rhönrad (German wheel) – which is made from two parallel metal rings and resembles a large hamster wheel.

== Construction ==
Modern Cyr wheels are typically made of stainless steel tubing or aluminium tubing approximately 1.5 inches (38 mm) in diameter. They are often composed of 3 or 5 individual pieces fixed together by steel or aluminium couplings. They may be painted and covered with an anti-slip plastic coating to add friction and protect the metal.

Smaller wheels spin faster, work better for smaller spaces, and make "no hand" tricks easier than larger wheels. Larger wheels are more graceful and there is more room for suspensions.

Recent developments in the discipline include the integration of programmable LED strips within the PVC coating of the wheel; these "LED Cyr wheels" use motion sensors to synchronize visual light patterns with the performer's rotation speed and the accompanying music.

== Popularity ==
Around 1996, the wheel's construction was adapted and developed as a circus apparatus by Daniel Cyr, a graduate of the National Circus School in Montreal and co-founder of the contemporary circus troupe Cirque Éloize. Cyr says the idea came to him from a large hula hoop and an old circular wrought-iron coat rack. His design for the wheel went through several iterations, evolving from steel to aluminum, adding a PVC coating, and eventually implementing a multi-part design that could be disassembled for easier transportation. Cyr first performed with the apparatus in the Cirque Éloize production of Excentricus, which toured North America, Europe and Asia between 1997 and 2002. He subsequently presented a Cyr wheel circus act at the 2003 Festival Mondial du Cirque de Demain in Paris and won the silver medal for his performance.

Since its recent popularization as a circus skill, hundreds of circus artists from around the world have performed in the wheel and it is now taught in several major circus schools. The USA Wheel Gymnastics Federation and the International Rhoenradturnen Verband, with significant assistance from coaches and athletes from the École Nationale de Cirque de Montréal, developed rules for Cyr wheel competition. The first such competition was held in Chicago in October 2011 and the first world championships in Cyr wheel competition was held during the 10th World Championships in Wheel Gymnastics, July 7–14, 2013 in Chicago.

Professional circus schools that offer advanced training on the Cyr wheel include: the Ecole Supérieure des Arts du Cirque (ESAC) in Belgium, the National Centre for Circus Arts in the UK, the Centre national des arts du cirque (CNAC) in France, the École nationale de cirque (ENC) in Montreal, the National Institute of Circus Arts (NICA) in Australia, the Instituto Nacional de Artes do Circo (INAC) in Portugal.

== Glossary ==
- The Waltz – the performer stands inside the Cyr wheel and rotates 360 in a continuous circle pattern, resembling the dance, the waltz.
- Superman – with the Cyr wheel spinning in a circle the performer holds on with their hands and kicks out with their legs in a pull up position, resembling the comic book hero Superman.
- Coin – with the Cyr wheel spinning the performer locks their shoulders and forces the Cyr wheel into a flat spin, resembling a coin losing speed after being spun on its edge. This trick can be performed face up or face down.
- Cartwheel - the performer stands inside the Cyr wheel and rolls along its rim at an angle, drawing a circle on the floor.
- Orbit – the performer stands in the centre of the Cyr wheel, remaining in one spot, and spins the Cyr wheel around them in 180 increments.
- Boomerang – Standing outside of the Cyr Wheel the performer rolls it away from them in a flat spin, on its own the Cyr wheel arcs around them eventually making its way back to its starting point where it is caught by the performer, resembling the action of a boomerang.
- Skate start – with one foot on the wheel, the performer pushes off with the other foot like they are riding a skateboard. They then add the "pushing foot" to the Cyr wheel and continue spinning.
- Swing start - with both feet on the ground, the performer swings the wheel around themselves to generate momentum, then quickly step on the wheel with both feet and continue spinning.

== See also ==
- Monowheel
- Wheel gymnastics
- Wheel of Steel
