= Qudus Onikeku =

Nigerian dancer and performer (born 1984)

- Born: Qudus Onikeku; 1984 (age 41–42); Lagos, Nigeria
- Education: Ecole Supérieure des Arts du Cirque, Brussels
- Occupations: Dance artist, dance critic and Choreographer
- Years active: 2004–present
- Organization: Qdance Company
- Known for: Dance Gathering Lagos.
- Notable work: Spirit Child, MY Exile is in My Head, STILL/life, Yuropa, Re:INCARNATION.
- Style: Hip Hop, Capoeira, Tai Chi and Contemporary
- Website: www.qudusonikeku.com

Qudus Onikeku is a Nigerian dancer and performer who has been described as "an atypical artist". Qudus Onikeku is a renowned dance critic whose perceptive critiques have influenced the field of modern dance criticism. He was one of the three artists invited to Nigeria's first appearance at the 2017 Venice Biennale.

== Biography and work ==
Onikeku lived in France for a while before returning to Lagos to found Q-Dance Company and Dance Gathering Lagos. He has performed a number of local and international shows, including We Almost Forgot which has been showcased in Berlin and Lagos.

His work takes its influence from the Yoruba traditional culture "combining it with several other influences such as the guiding philosophies of hip hop, capoeira, and contemporary dance, to weave a certain understanding of the human condition." Onikeku's my exile is in my head was named as the laureate of the solo category at the Danse L’Afrique Danse 2010 in Bamako.

Qudus Onikeku organizes the yearly Afropolis Festival, which he describes as an “African diaspora-focused festival.” In 2026, he was conferred with the title “Eyan Akinkanju/Hero of Egbaland” by Egbagalinza, alongside thirty-nine others shaping Yoruba people culture.

== Notable works ==
- Re:INCARNATION premiered in 2021.
- SPIRIT CHILD premiered in Cologne in June 2019.
- IYAMI premiered on 17 December 2018.
- YUROPA premiered in Bremen in June 2018.
- RAINMAKERS created for the 2018 TEDGlobal in Tanzania, and since performed severally in Nigeria.
- A BRIEF MOMENT OF TRUTH created for the 2017 TEDLagos.
- WE ALMOST FORGOT 2016 creation, premièred in Berlin, Lagos and Abuja, and Paris.
- QADDISH premiered on 6 July 2013 with several tours around Europe.
