= New Paradise Laboratories =

- Founded: 1996
- Founder: Whit MacLaughlin
- Type: 501(c)(3) non-profit
- Location: Philadelphia, Pennsylvania
- Method: experimental theater, experience design ensemble
- Members: 20+
- Website: newparadiselaboratories.org

New Paradise Laboratories (NPL) is a 501(c)(3) experimental theater ensemble based in Philadelphia, Pennsylvania. Founded in 1996, NPL collaborates with artists from a variety of disciplines, including web designers, visual artists, writers, philosophers, composers, and architects, as well as performers who work together to create interactive theater works and immersive experiences.

== History ==
Founded in 1996 by Whit MacLaughlin, New Paradise Laboratories (NPL) has created an average of one original performance work each year since its founding. Their work has been presented as part of the Philadelphia Fringe Festival, the Humana Festival of New American Plays, Children's Theatre Company, and in residencies with universities all over the United States.

== Grants and recognition ==
- 2002: Pew Charitable Trusts Fellowship in Performance Art Grant to Whit MacLaughlin
- 2003: National Endowment for the Arts Pennsylvania Council on the Arts Artistic Advancement Grant
- 2003: Pennsylvania Performing Arts on Tour artist
- 2004: Creative Capital MAP Fund grant recipient
- 2006: "Best of Philly: Theater Company" by Philadelphia Magazine
- 2007: F. Otto Haas Emerging Artist Award recipient Matt Saunders. Among the nominees were also Lee Ann Etzold and Jeb Kreager.
- 2010: MAP Fund grant recipient
- 2010: Jorge Cousineau named "Artist of the Year" by Philadelphia Weekly

== Company members ==
A 2006 reworking of the hit Prom by NPL for Children's Theatre Company, which in 2004 was deemed "Best Stage Production."

- Whit MacLaughlin (Artistic Director) - he has conceived, directed, and designed 20 original performance works with the company since its inception in 1996. Since 1978, he has acted in, directed, or written over 100 theatre productions.
- KC Chun-Manning (Managing Director) - served from 2015 to 2020 and remains active on Board of Directors.

== Productions ==
Year	Production	Location	Notes
1999	"Stupor"	Philadelphia, PA	Barrymore Award nominee for Outstanding Choreography
2000	"The Fab 4 Reach the Pearly Gates"	New York City, NY	Obie Award winner
2001	"This Mansion is a Hole"	Philadelphia, PA	Barrymore Award nominee for Outstanding Sound Design (Whit MacLaughlin)
2003	"Rrose Selavy Takes a Lover in Philadelphia"	Philadelphia, PA	Barrymore Award nominee for Outstanding Ensemble in a Play
2004	"Prom"	Minneapolis, MN	Children's Theatre Company
2005	"Planetary Enzyme Blues"	Philadelphia, PA	PECO Energy Award nominee for Outstanding Lighting Design (Mark O'Maley)
2006	"Prom"	Minneapolis, MN	Children's Theatre Company (second production), deemed Best Stage Production 2004.
2007	"Batch: An American Bachelor/Ette Party Spectacle"	Louisville, KY	World premiere: Humana Festival of New American Plays (Louisville, February 2007). Regional premiere: Philadelphia Live Arts Festival (Philadelphia, September 2007)
2008	"Prom"	Philadelphia, PA	Residency at Drexel University. Barrymore Award nominee for Outstanding Choreography/Movement (Lee Ann Etzold and Whit MacLaughlin)
2010	"Freedom Club"	Philadelphia, PA	With the Riot Group & Adriano Shaplin
2011	"Freedom Club"	New York, NY	Off-off Broadway
2013	"Prom"	Wilmington, NC	Professional Partnership with the University of North Carolina at Wilmington Department of Theatre
