= Dracula's Cabaret =

Cabaret venue in Gold Coast, Australia

- Interactive map of Dracula's Cabaret
- Location: 1 Hooker Blvd; Broadbeach QLD 4218
- Coordinates: 28.03405160608331°S 153.42893020957482°E
- Seating type: Seated
- Type: Cabaret

Construction
- Built: 1985

Dracula's Cabaret (or simply Dracula's) is an indoor theatre, music venue and event space located in Gold Coast, Queensland, Australia

== History ==
In 1980, Tikki and John Newman were inspired by The Rocky Horror Picture Show to launch a spooky theatre in Drewery Lane, Melbourne. They had previously been responsible for opening Australia's first theatre restaurant - Tikki and John's - in 1964 on Exhibition Street, Melbourne which, by 1982 was known as Crazy House. Dracula's moved to the larger Victoria Street, Melbourne location in 1990 and stayed in business until 2017.

Dracula's Cabaret opened its doors on the Gold Coast in 1985 after an old shopping centre sandwiched between Conrad Jupiters Casino and Pacific Fair was converted into a performance theatre. In 2023, the venue was temporarily closed as the building caught on fire and 225 patrons were evacuated. Dracula's celebrated its 40th anniversary in 2025 with a new show titled 'Lucid'.

== Notable performers ==
- Ernie Bourne
- Harley Cameron
- Steven Gates
- Brian Hannan
- Mekonnen Knife
- Sarah Louis-Jean
- Brett Swain

Crazy House

- Brian Mannix

== See also ==
- List of restaurants in Australia
