= Adam Krieger =

German composer

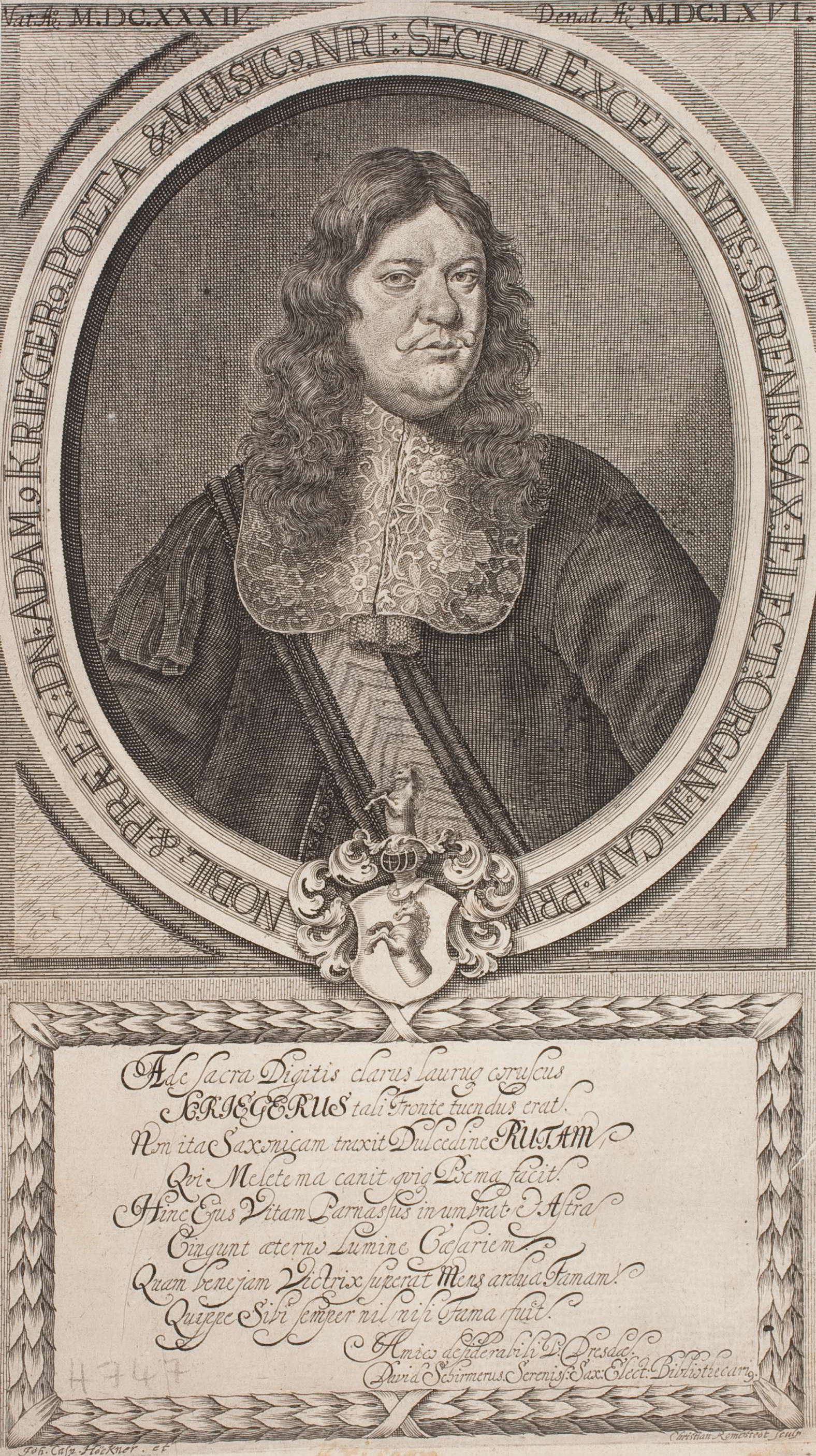
- Portrait of Krieger by Romstet
- Born: 7 January 1634; Driesen
- Died: 30 June 1666 (aged 32); Dresden
- Occupations: Composer; Director of church music
- Organization: Nikolaikirche, Leipzig

Adam Krieger (7 January 1634 – 30 June 1666) was a German composer. Born in Driesen, Neumark, he studied organ with Samuel Scheidt in Halle. He succeeded Johann Rosenmüller as organist at Leipzig's Nikolaikirche (1655–57) and founded the city's Collegium Musicum before settling for the rest of his career as court organist in Dresden.

Krieger composed and versified numerous songs. His fame rests on his pioneering role in the development of the solo Lied. His first collection of songs appeared in 1657; they are marked by simple folk-like melodies. His second collection of Arien (1667) survives and has been published in vol. 19 of Denkmäler deutscher Tonkunst. His most famous song is "Nun sich der Tag geendet hat" (English: "Now the day has ended"), which may be found in the hymnal of the Lutheran church.

Adam Krieger is unrelated to the later German composers Johann Philipp Krieger and Johann Krieger.
