= Philadelphia School of Circus Arts =

School in Pennsylvania, United States of America

Coordinates: 40.035525°N 75.178963°W

The Philadelphia School of Circus Arts (PSCA) is a contemporary circus school in Philadelphia. It began in June 2008.

The curriculum includes aerial skills, such as static trapeze, corde lisse or rope, lyra) and juggling, unicycling, tightwire, tumbling, Chinese acrobatics, physical conditioning and other circus arts. Class sessions run four times per year, for eight weeks per session. Classes are for all ages, ranging from children 18 months and older, to adults of any age. This is a recreational school, rather than a professional development program.

In addition to ongoing classes, PSCA offers introductory workshops that are around one hour in length. They introduce potential students to aerials, circus arts, or children's circus arts. These special workshops require no prior experience in circus arts or formal training. The workshops also provide a forum for participants to try out aerials, circus arts and children's circus arts without the commitment of an eight-week session.

PSCA has expanded from a school where one can learn circus arts to a performing arts organization that offers performances on-site and in the community. PSCA is a regular participant in the Philadelphia International Children's Festival, Philadelphia Folk Festival, the Chestnut Hill Fall for Arts festival, and other community celebrations. The school presents an annual fall cabaret performance every November. PSCA is also participating in the Kimmel Center for the Arts "Philadelphia International Festival of the Arts" in spring, 2011. The school is also the home to several performances that are part of the Philadelphia Fringe Festival. In 2009, Philadelphia School of Circus Arts attracted 1,500 patrons to performances and events.

The school is a tenant at Circus Campus in Philadelphia, As of June 2026 PSCA/Airplay are owned and managed by Kitsie O'Neill.

== Summer camp ==
Every summer, PSCA presents summer camps for children of all ages. The Youth Camp gives children the opportunity to develop skills on the trapeze, aerial rope and silks, juggling, unicycling, plate-spinning, diabolo, devil sticks, tightwire, rolling globe, rola-bola, clowning and tumbling. The Youth Camp also includes activities such as dance and performance classes, student showtimes, lunchtimes in the park, co-operative games. Children must be seven years old and have completed the first grade to attend youth camp. Kindercamp is for children five to six years old. This one-week program places a greater emphasis on play and exploration. Children will learn how to do trapeze, aerial rope and silks, feather-balancing, scarf-juggling, plate-spinning, tightwire, rolling globe, tumbling and obstacle courses. The camp also includes playground visits, arts and crafts projects, as well as rest time.

Additional activities at the PSCA studio include children's birthday parties, wedding and social events, private lessons, corporate team-building workshops, guest workshops, and school vacation activities.

== Coaches ==
The head coach at PSCA was Adam Woolley until 2020, when he was replaced by Rachel Lancaster.

== Performances ==
PSCA puts on several shows and performances annually, both in and out of the school itself. They have Student showcases twice a year for adult students and once for younger students in a "Youth Soirée". in addition to these, many of the staff members at the school participate in gigs and traveling performances throughout the year. The smaller youth group called PSCA's "Youth Troupe" coordinates many shows throughout the greater Philadelphia area. Some students may also coordinate shows with other schools, like the Pennsylvania Academy of Ballet. The school also helps rent out Circus Campus facilities for special events staffed by its coaches, as well as some of its own equipment to other Kennedy circus endeavors. PSCA also puts on a number of workshops at area charter schools.

== History ==
Philadelphia School of Circus Arts (PSCA) was founded by Shana Kennedy. Her husband Greg Kennedy is an internationally renowned juggler, who was in Cirque du Soliel's Totem from 2010-2014. Shana trained as an aerialist and a juggler at Circomedia, in England where she met Greg, putting her career on pause to pursue raising a family.

She began teaching aerial skills in her home's backyard in 2001. In 2003 Kitsie O'Neill started taking classes with Shana in her backyard. In 2006, Kennedy formed Air Play, which would become a performance and teaching company. In 2008, Kennedy opened the full-fledged school facility known today as Philadelphia School of Circus Arts. That same year, Kitsie O'Neill started part-time in the office. Kitsie O'Neill and became part owner in late-2015 and is the school's Executive Director. In 2026, Shana retired from circus and Kitsie became sole owner.

The school attracts students are all ages and all levels, coming from the local area (Germantown, Mt. Airy, Chestnut Hill, Philadelphia, South Jersey) all the way to New York City. The studio space is located in a renovated church sanctuary, "Circus Campus" (a separate legal entity, controlled by Kennedy)with peak 40-foot ceilings, rigging points for 18 pieces of aerial equipment, and an expanse of wood flooring. It is the site of the original St. Madeleine Sophie Church, and was purchased by Kennedy for $1.2 million dollars. Directly below the sanctuary is a 5,000 square feet (460 m^{2}) gymnasium with 17-foot ceilings. Additionally, there is an attached school building which holds 10 separate classrooms. The entire property has over 25,000 square feet (2,300 m^{2}) of useable space.

PSCA is an affiliate member of the Theatre Alliance of Greater Philadelphia. In 2010, PSCA was named "Best Children's Entertainment Winner" by the voters and readers of MyPHL17 Hotlist/Cityvoter for children's entertainment. In 2009, PSCA was named "Best of Philadelphia" by Philadelphia Magazine for children's classes. In 2025 & 2026, PSCA was named "Best of Philadelphia" by Philadelphia Magazine for Summer Camp.

People have traveled from as far as Brooklyn, New York and Wilmington, Delaware, to attend the school.

== Similar schools ==
Other circus schools include Aloft Loft in Chicago; Circus Center in San Francisco; the New England Center for Circus Arts in Brattleboro, Vermont; San Diego Circus Center in San Diego CA, SANCA in Seattle, Washington; Wise Fool in New Mexico; FLY Circus Space in New Orleans; Canopy in Georgia; SHOW Circus Studio, ESH, and BCC in Massachusetts; the Boulder Circus Center in Colorado; MOTH in Denver; and Aircraft in Boston.
