= Dalhousie Station (Canadian Pacific Railway) =

Railway station in Montreal, Quebec, Canada

Coordinates: 45.5115°N 73.5518°W

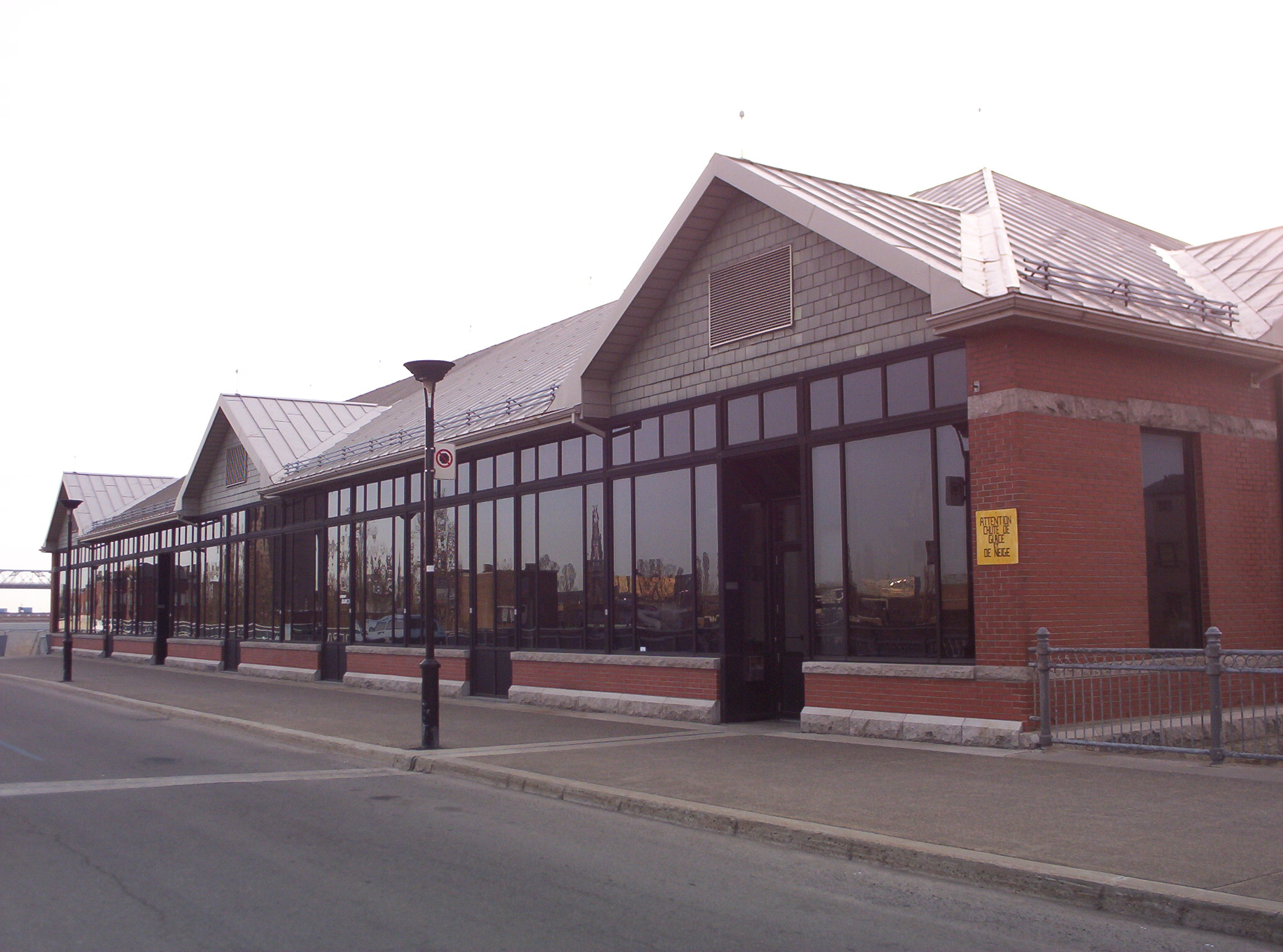
Dalhousie Station in 2006.

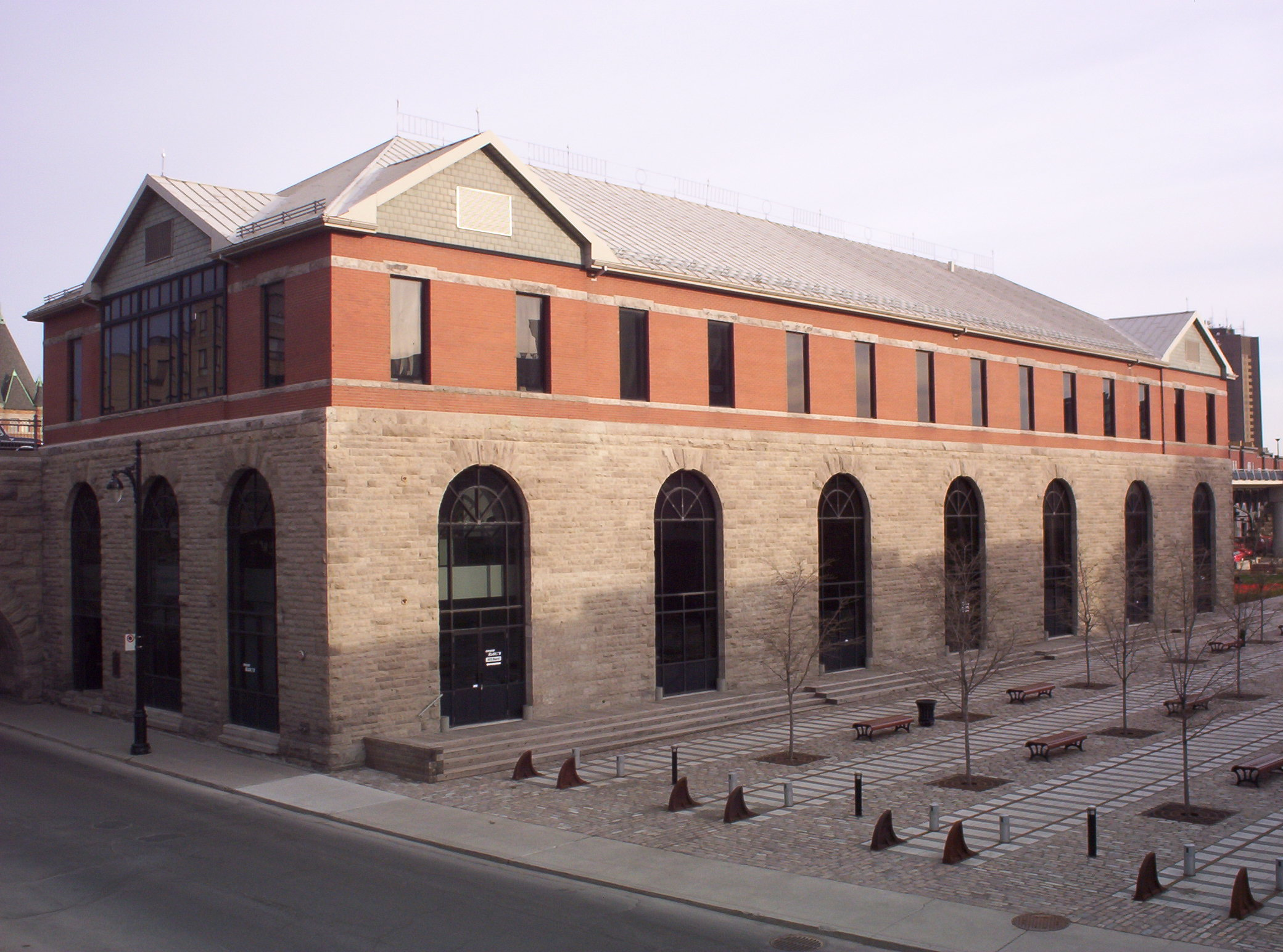
Dalhousie Station in 2006.

Dalhousie Station (French: Gare Dalhousie) is a former railway station in Montreal, Quebec, Canada. Built in 1884, the building stands at the corner of Notre-Dame Street and Berri Street in what is now known as Old Montreal. As the oldest surviving railway station building in Montreal, Dalhousie Station was named after George Ramsay, 9th Earl of Dalhousie, who served as the Governor General of Canada from 1825 to 1828.

Although the terminal location was originally purchased by the Quebec, Montreal, Ottawa and Occidental Railway, all construction was done by the Canadian Pacific Railway after it purchased the QMO&O in 1882. Consequently, Dalhousie Station thus became the original eastern terminus for CP Rail.

Since 2004, the station building has been the home of the Cirque Éloize.

== Operation ==
The first all-Canadian transcontinental train left Dalhousie Station bound for Port Moody, British Columbia, on June 28, 1886, at 8:00 p.m.

Five years after its opening, Canadian Pacific opened a second Montreal terminal, Windsor Station, in February 1889. It had better access to rail routes to the United States, southern Quebec, and southern Ontario, and a more convenient location on the west side of town. After a new, shorter line to Ottawa via Rigaud opened in February 1898, the transcontinental route was redirected to Windsor Station.

Dalhousie Station was superseded by the grander Place Viger Station, a block to the north of Dalhousie Station, in August 1898.

== Design and redevelopment ==
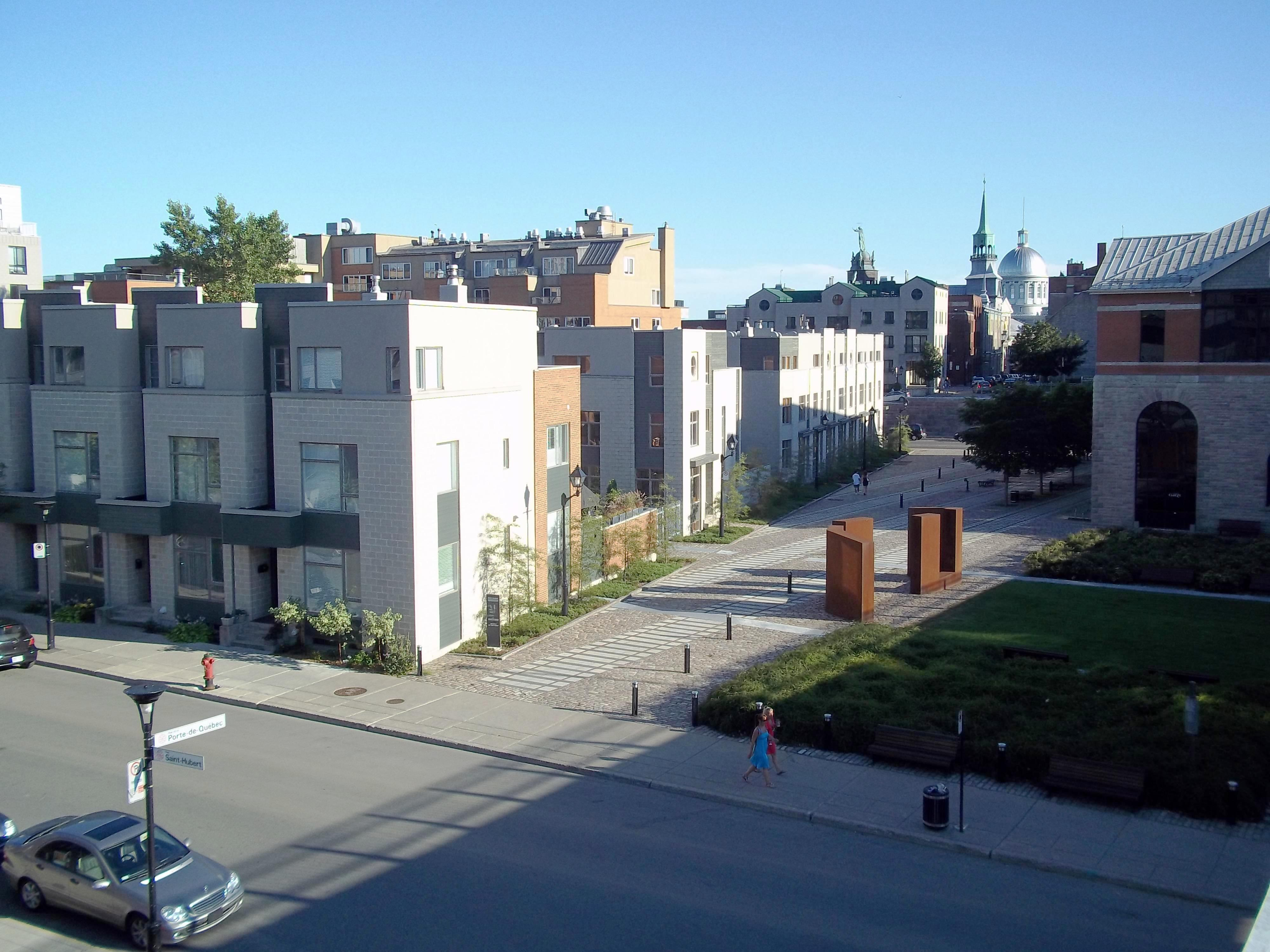
Dalhousie Square, with station at right, July 2011.

Like other early CPR stations, Dalhousie Station was designed by British-born architect Thomas Charles Sorby.

Dalhousie Station is architecturally notable for its combination of stone and brick and its high windows.

The station is now part of a remodeled Dalhousie Square, completed in 2004, which links Old Montreal and the Faubourg Quebec residential district. Dalhousie Square was designed by Robert Desjardins of the City of Montreal and includes a sculpture by Jocelyne Alloucherie entitled Porte de jour. The redesigned square received honour from the Canadian Society of Landscape Architects in 2006.
