= Philadelphia Fringe Festival =

Annual arts festival in Philadelphia

- Location: Philadelphia, Pennsylvania
- Founded: 1997
- Founded by: Deborah Block; Eric Schoefer; Nick Stuccio
- Hosted by: FringeArts
- Website: https://phillyfringe.org/

The Philadelphia Fringe Festival, also known as Philly Fringe, and formerly the Philadelphia Live Arts Festival and Philly Fringe, is a fringe theater festival that takes place every September in Philadelphia. The 2025 festival sold over 35,000 tickets to more than 350 events in venues across Philadelphia.

The Festival is organized by FringeArts, who present curated work by both local and touring artists, alongside partner "hub" organizations, and list unjuried independent artists and producers in a festival guide. The Festival is an incubator and showcase of new performance in Philadelphia, with half or more of the events put on by local artists and collectives.

The Festival lists shows by categories including theater, dance, comedy, immersive, circus, music, art for young audiences, storytelling, cabaret, clown, and visual arts, though many shows are cross-listed. Audience choice awards, the Fringies, are given out in some categories.

== History ==
The Philadelphia Fringe was founded in 1997 by Deborah Block, Eric Schoefer, and Nick Stuccio. The first festival took place over five days in September 1997 and included work from Pig Iron Theatre Company. Total attendance was 12,000.

By 2002, the Festival established itself as an important part of Philadelphia's theater scene, with a significant number of local experimental and devised theater ensembles participating in the festival, including Pig Iron, New Paradise Laboratories, Theatre Exile, and Headlong Dance Theater, often collaborating between groups and across disciplines. The 2002 Festival was two weeks long and featured around 250 shows, with the curated "Spotlight" series including Karen Finley and the North American debut of Teatr Biuro Podróży.

To differentiate between curated and unjuried events, in 2004 the Festival changed its name to the "Philadelphia Live Arts Festival and the Philly Fringe," presenting the "Live Arts" section as a second festival, parallel to the fringe. The 2004 festival featured more than 200 events over 17 days.

By 2012, attendance rose to 40,000. In 2013, the host organization again changed its name to FringeArts, and the curated programming was rolled back into the Fringe Festival as "presented" work. At the time, former Pennsylvania Governor and former Philadelphia Mayor Ed Rendell credited the Festival with helping to revitalize Center City. Taking place over 18 days, the 2013 festival included 16 presented shows and 136 unjuried "neighborhood fringe" shows.

For 2020, the festival was held primarily online in response to the COVID-19 pandemic. About 15 of the 118 shows programmed were held in-person and outdoors for mask-wearing audiences, others were hybrid virtual events designed to be experienced outside, while the rest took place online.

The 25 day 2021 festival was a hybrid of live and online events. Of 160 independently produced events, 70% were held in-person. The first "hub" of the Fringe, the Cannonball Festival, an independently produced festival within the Festival, debuted in 2021.

The 2025 Festival sold over 35,300 seats for 353 events scheduled across 96 venues. 13,000 of those tickets were at Cannonball, which itself hosted 131 events. One performance was cancelled due to changes to United States visa policy made during the festival. Additional hubs included the Circus Campus in Mount Airy, the Sawubona Creativity Project in South Philadelphia, Studio 34 in West Philadelphia, and Dumb Hub, focused on alternative comedy and clowning.
