= Jacek Paczkowski =

Polish footballer (born 1981)

Personal information
- Date of birth: 2 September 1981 (age 45)
- Place of birth: Drezdenko, Poland
- Height: 1.79 m (5 ft 10 1/2 in)
- Position: Defender

Team information
- Current team: KS Opatówek
- Number: 23

Senior career*
Years	Team	Apps	(Gls)
1999	Lubuszanin Drezdenko		
2000–2001	Lech Poznań	0	(0)
2001–2002	Aluminium Konin		
2002–2004	Warmia Grajewo		
2005–2007	Zagłębie Sosnowiec	62	(4)
2008–2009	Podbeskidzie Bielsko-Biała		
2009–2010	Tur Turek	30	(0)
2010–2011	Flota Świnoujście	22	(1)
2012	Lech Rypin	11	(1)
2012–2014	Calisia Kalisz		
2014–2016	KKS 1925 Kalisz		
2016–2017	LKS Gołuchów		
2017	Zieloni Koźminek	12	(2)
2018	Victoria Skarszew	22	(0)
2019–2020	Olimpia Brzeziny	22	(3)
2021	CKS Zbiersk	14	(0)
2024–	KS Opatówek	42	(2)
- * Club domestic league appearances and goals as of 08:14, 23 June 2026 (UTC)

Jacek Paczkowski (born 2 September 1981) is a Polish footballer who plays as a defender for KS Opatówek. He previously played in the Ekstraklasa for Zagłębie Sosnowiec.

== Honours ==
Lech Rypin

- III liga Kuyavia-Pomerania–Greater Poland: 2011–12

KS Opatówek

- Klasa A Greater Poland IX: 2024–25
