= Jocelyne Alloucherie =

Canadian sculptor and academic

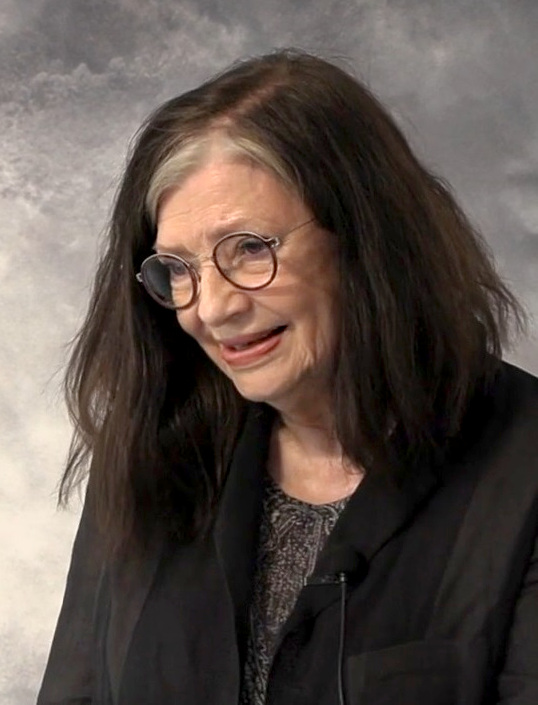
- Alloucherie in 2022
- Born: February 8, 1947 (age 79); Mont-Apica, Quebec, Canada
- Known for: Sculpture
- Awards: Order of Canada

Jocelyne Alloucherie (born February 8, 1947) is a Canadian installation artist who explores the relationships between sculpture, architecture and photography through her work.

== Career ==
Born in Mont-Apica, Quebec, she spent many of her early years in Chicoutimi and moved to Quebec City before 1961. She studied for short periods at the Ecole des Beaux-Arts, Quebec between 1961 and 1965. She studied visual arts at Laval University from 1970 to 1973, graduating with her B.F.A. She held a solo show of her work at the Musee du Quebec in 1973. In 1974, she began teaching plastic arts courses at Laval University part-time, while devoting her free time to her own art. She received a Master of Fine Arts degree in 1981 from Concordia University. She has spent over thirty years practicing and teaching visual arts and art history at the Laval University, the Université du Québec à Montréal, Concordia University, and the University of Ottawa.

Jocelyne Alloucherie offered some reflections on the development of her work in the exhibit guide to Climats (Climates) held at the Carleton University Art Gallery in 2010:

"I develop rich bodies of work, grouped together under the same title and whose relations change according to the time and place of their exhibition. Like pieces of music, they undergo variation according to the way they are interpreted, which is a function of the space in which they are shown. The conceptual thread of a work is constant, but the way it is exhibited is not absolutely fixed"

== Solo exhibitions ==
- Her first solo exhibition was held at the Musee du Quebec (1973)
- Inside Out at L'Oratorio San Ludovico (Venice, 2005)
- Occidents at the Grand Palais (Paris, 2008)
- Sirens at 511 Gallery (New York, 2009)
- Lames, Sirene, Poussieres at Palazzo Brandolin Rota (Venice, 2009)
- Climates at the Carleton University Art Gallery (Ottawa, 2010)
- Una realta flutuente at VillaGiulia (Verbania, Italy, 2011)
- Boreales at the MuMa (Musee Andre Malraux) (Le Havre, France, 2012)

== Group exhibitions ==
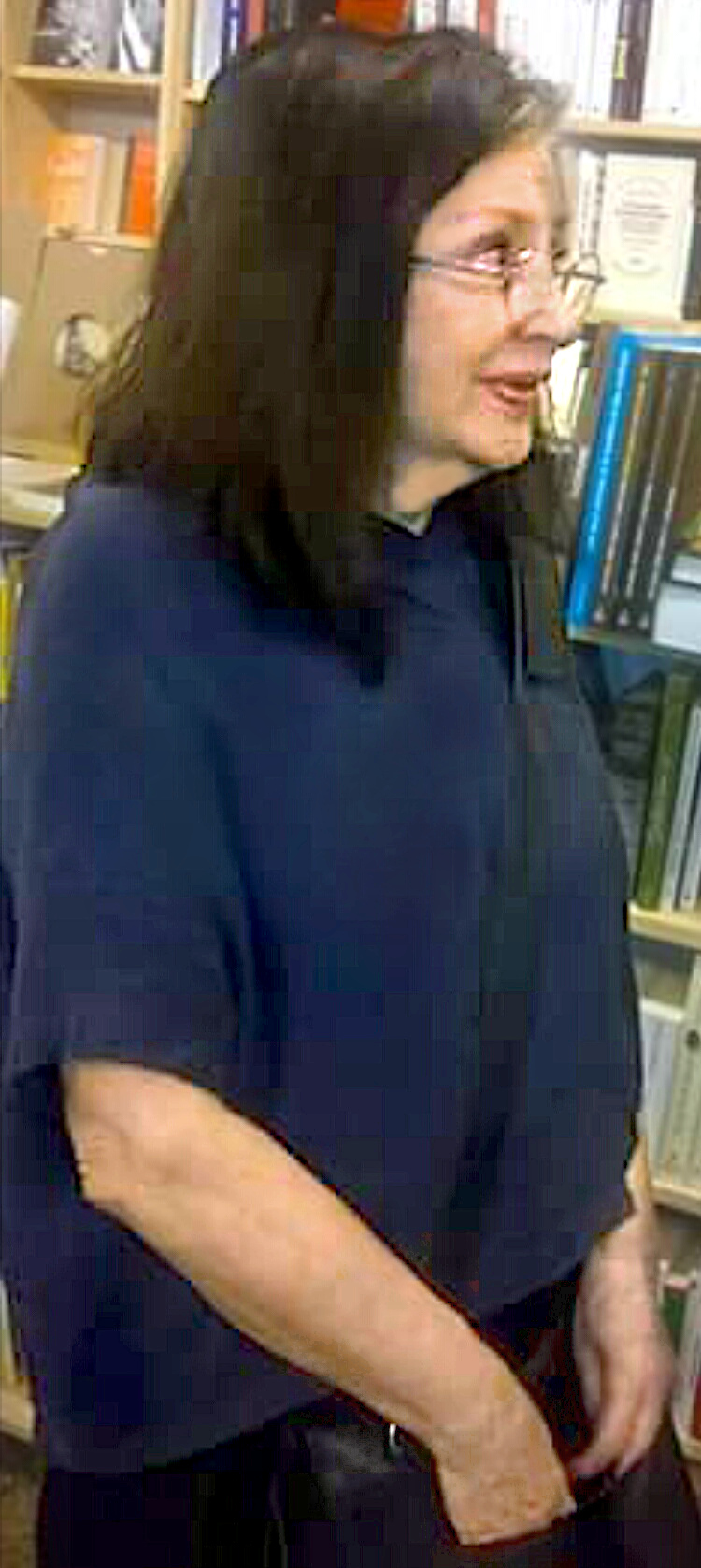
Alloucherie at the bookstore Le Port de tête, 2017

- Anninovanta (Bologna, 1991)
- Differentes natures (Paris, 1993)
- Libera mente Palazzo del Capitano (Cesena, Italy 1998)
- La Disparition third Biennale de Liege (2002)
- Camere con vista Centre II Filatoio (Caraglio, Italy, 2002)
- Species d'espays, at Tinglado 2 (Tarragona, 2003).
- Il Velo (Turin, 2007)
- Tout ce qui bouge ne se voit pas Transphotographiques (Lille, 2008)
- Chambres d'Echo Musee Reattu (Arles, 2009)
- L'arbre et le photograph the gallery of the Ecole des Beaux-Arts de Paris (2012)

== Honours ==
- Victor Martyn Lynch-Staunton Award of the Canada Council for the Arts (1988)
- Deutscher Akademischer Austauschdienst (DAAD) award (1997)
- Louis-Philippe Hebert Award of the Societe Saint-Jean-Baptiste (1997)
- Governor General's Award in Visual and Media Arts (2000) in recognition for being a "seminal artist of her generation"
- Quebec government's Prix Paul-Émile-Borduas (2002)
- Prize of the Association of Canadian publications Artist Project in Canadian Art (2004)
- Prix Jean-Paul Riopelle, Conseil des arts et des lettres du Québec (2006)
- Officer of the Order of Canada (2008) "for her contributions to the visual arts as an internationally renowned sculptor"
- Her sculpture Porte de jour is the centrepiece of the remodeled Dalhousie Square in Old Montreal, designed by Robert Desjardins, which was honoured by the Canadian Society of Landscape Architects (2006)
