= Circus school =

School teaching circus skills

Circus schools are institutions that offer professional and sometimes degree-level training in various circus skills such as acrobatics, aerial arts, object manipulation, and other specialized physical skills. The rise of the circus school as a venue for the transmission of traditional circus arts and the formalized research of new acts is a relatively recent phenomenon in the history of the circus.

== Notable professional circus schools ==
- Académie Fratellini (La Plaine Saint-Denis, France)
- Circomedia (Bristol, UK)
- Circus Juventas (St. Paul, Minnesota, U.S.)
- Circus Center (San Francisco, California, U.S.)
- Cirkus Cirkör (Stockholm, Sweden)
- École Nationale de Cirque de Châtellerault (Châtellerault, France)
- Ecole Supérieure des Arts du Cirque (Brussels, Belgium)
- The Flying Fruit Fly Circus (Albury, Australia)
- Gamma Phi Circus (Illinois State University)
- National Centre for Circus Arts (formerly The Circus Space; London, UK)
- National Institute of Circus Arts (Melbourne, Australia)
- New England Center for Circus Arts (Brattleboro, Vermont, U.S.)
- Philadelphia School of Circus Arts (Philadelphia, U.S.)

== Circus programs within degree-awarding academic institutions ==
Gamma Phi Circus at Illinois State University is the oldest collegiate circus in the United States. It was founded in 1929 and is part of the College of Applied Science and Technology at ISU. Florida State University Flying High Circus is a collegiate circus that was founded in 1947 as an extracurricular activity club. Members must be students who are registered and seeking degrees from FSU. Student interest clubs that offer students the chance to train recreationally in contemporary circus arts include Cirque NouveaU: An Aerial Arts Club at Northwestern University, a club that offers ground skill workouts in partner balancing and tumbling to undergraduates.
