= Cirque Éloize =

Canadian circus company

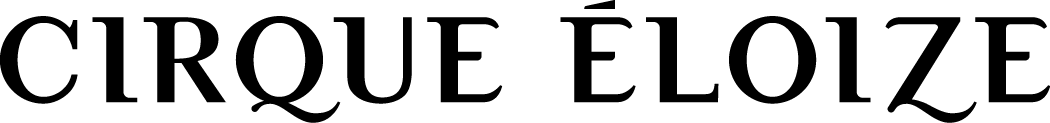

Origin
- Country: Canada
- Founder(s): Jeannot Painchaud; Daniel Cyr; Claudette Morin; Julie Hamelin
- Year founded: 1993

Information
- Director: Elise Charbonneau, Chief Executive Officer
- Traveling show?: Yes
- Circus tent?: Sometimes
- Winter quarters: Montreal, Quebec, Canada
- Website: www.cirque-eloize.com

Cirque Éloize ([siʁk elwaz]) is a contemporary circus company founded in Montreal in 1993 by Jeannot Painchaud, Daniel Cyr, Claudette Morin, and Julie Hamelin. Its productions combine circus arts with music, dance, technology, and theatre. "Éloize" means "heat lightning" in Acadian French, a dialect spoken in Acadia and the Magdalen Islands, where the group's founders are from.

The headquarters and studio are located in Old Montreal inside Dalhousie Station, a former train station and historical building where the École nationale de cirque (National Circus School) was based from 1989 to 2003.

Cirque Éloize has produced more than 7,000 performances in over 700 cities around the world.

== Cyr Wheel ==
Daniel Cyr, co-founder of Cirque Éloize, invented an acrobatic apparatus known as the Cyr Wheel, for which he won a silver medal at the Festival Mondial du Cirque de Demain in 2003. The Cyr Wheel has since been used in the majority of Cirque Éloize's creations. The Cyr Wheel technique is now taught in several professional schools in various countries.

== Clients ==
Cirque Éloize designs and produces tailored concepts and events for corporate, private, and governmental clients. The company has produced over 1,800 custom events in its Dalhousie Station studio and on stages around the world.

Cirque Éloize performed in the 2006 Winter Olympics closing ceremony; at the inauguration of the Jaeger-Lecoultre boutique at Place Vendôme in 2012; and in Montreal's 375th anniversary festivities in 2017. Cirque Éloize also performed in the first Biennale Internationale des Arts du Cirque festival in 2015. The Montreal Symphony Orchestra presented a free concert with Cirque Eloize in August 2018 of the symphonic suite Scheherazade.

In 2021, Cirque Éloize created and presented the opening ceremony for the 27th edition of the IHF World Men's Handball Championship in Cairo, Egypt, with local partners HiLights and Egyptian Engineering Projects. In 2022, Cirque Éloize created and produced the opening ceremony for the 2022 GCC Games; the ceremony was presented in front of 5,000 spectators in Kuwait and broadcast throughout the Middle East.

== Productions ==
=== Serge Fiori - Seul Ensemble (2026 -) ===
More than 70,000 audience members were already captivated by the show’s first iteration in 2019, before the pandemic cut short its run. Serge Fiori – Seul Ensemble returns in a completely reimagined version, starting August 29 in Montreal, followed by a tour across the province. With new circus acts, new disciplines, new visual scenes, and a redesigned set: this production goes far beyond a mere revival.

Directed by Benoit Landry and with musical direction by Louis-Jean Cormier and Alex McMahon, the show does not recount the artist’s life. Rather, it invites us to enter his imagination through his music, poetry, and the emotion his works evoke.

=== Wings of Memory - Everland (2026 -) ===
Wings of Memory is a visual fable where wonder guides Eyell, a young heroine, through an ever-changing world inhabited by spirits and fantastical creatures. Supported by an immersive stage environment combining projections and video mapping, the performance brings shifting landscapes to life, responding to the character’s emotions and discoveries.

As part of a two-year licensed partnership, Everland—operated by Samsung C&T—commissioned Cirque Éloize to design and produce an exclusive permanent show; tailored specifically for the park’s theater, aiming for theatrical immersion and a distinct experience.

=== iD - Évolution (2025-) ===
Building on the international success of this production, Cirque Éloize created iD - Evolution. Staged by Jeannot Painchaud with choreography by Elon Höglund, iD - Evolution is a new iteration inspired by the original iD, preserving the distinctive urban circus and dance universe that contributed to its success while updating production for a new generation of audiences.

=== Bon Voyage (2024-2025) ===
An Immersive Show Combining History, Circus Arts, and Technology

Bon Voyage transports spectators to the late 19th-century Montreal, as the first trans-Canadian train journey is about to leave Dalhousie Station for the west coast. Five circus artists bring this moment of history to life in this show featuring an immersive set design.

Bon Voyage mixes circus arts, physical theatre, and 360-degree video projection to create a world where memory and imagination meet for a total sensory experience. Directed by Fernand Rainville, it’s a combination of poetry, acrobatics, and comedy.

=== Entre ciel et mer (2022–2024) ===
To celebrate its 30th anniversary in 2023, Cirque Éloize is presenting Entre ciel et mer.

=== Serge Fiori - Seul ensemble (2019–2020) ===
Staged by Benoit Landry, Serge Fiori - Seul ensemble is a homage to Serge Fiori's music. Using songs from his band Harmonium and from his solo career, five dancers and 15 acrobats perform the show periodically in Montréal and Québec City. The show was at Théâtre St-Denis in Montréal starting March 6, 2019, then at the Théâtre Capitole in Quebec City starting June 20, 2019. 75,000 people saw the show before it was cancelled in August 2021 due to the COVID-19 pandemic.

=== Hotel (2018–2019) ===
Staged by Emmanuel Guillaume, Hotel was created for Cirque Éloize' 25th anniversary. The premiere took place at the Foxwoods Resort Casino in August 2018.

=== Nezha (2018) ===
Nezha tells the story of an orphan abandoned on a mysterious island. Rightful heir to a group called the Red Flags, she attempts to become the most fearsome pirate of all time.

The show combines dance, acrobatics, martial arts, and visual projections in an amphitheatre. Presented at the Shawinigan Cité de l'Énergie specialty museum, Nezha is Cirque Éloize' first semi-permanent show. It premiered on July 5, 2018.

=== Saloon (2016) ===
Saloon is a Western with an original score written by Éloi Painchaud, including excerpts from Patsy Cline and Johnny Cash classics. Eleven artists, three of which are musicians, use dance, song, and acrobatics.

The Canadian premiere of the show took place at the Saint-Tite Western Festival in 2016.

Saloon's staging is done by Emmanuel Guillaume.

=== Cirkopolis (2012–2014) ===
Created in 2012, Cirkopolis is a show staged by Jeannot Painchaud and choreographer Dave St-Pierre. Cirkopolis's aesthetics are inspired by the Fritz Lang film Metropolis. The rest of the creative team includes scenographer Robert Massicotte, videographer Alexis Laurence, costume designer Liz Vandal, lighting designer Nicolas Descôteaux, acrobatics designer Krzysztof Soroczynski, and composer Stéphan Boucher. The stage is set in a mill town.

In 2018, Cirkopolis became the first show in Saudi Arabia to present women on stage in front of an audience composed of both men and women.

==== Awards and nominations ====
2014: Drama Desk Awards, New York City

- Unique Theatrical Experience Award

=== iD (2009–2017) ===
Staged by Jeannot Painchaud, iD combines circus arts with street dances such as breakdancing and hip hop. The rest of the creative team includes scenographer Robert Massicotte, videographer Alexis Laurence, costume designer Linda Brunelle, lighting designer Nicolas Descôteaux, acrobatics designer Krzysztof Soroczynski, and composers Jean-Phi Goncalves and Alex McMahon. On stage, 15 artists go through a total of 13 different acrobatic disciplines.

In July 2010, iD was presented as the opening show for the first Montréal Complètement Cirque festival. In October 2016, iD had its thousandth performance in London.

==== Awards and nominations ====
2010: Conseil des arts et des lettres du Québec

- Grand Prix

=== Le Music-Hall de la Baronne (July 2 to 24, 2013) ===
Le Music-Hall de la Baronne was created in collaboration with the Montréal Complètement Cirque festival. Staged by Denis Bouchard, the cabaret-style show was presented in Montreal during the festival in July 2013.

=== Nebbia (2007–2011) ===
Written and staged by Daniele Finzi Pasca, Nebbia is a Cirque Éloize and Teatro Sunil co-production and the last chapter of the Trilogie du Ciel (Nomade, Rain, Nebbia). Nebbia means "fog" in Italian; the show is about the dream and imaginary worlds.

Nebbia was designed by the same creative team as the two previous shows.

=== Rain:Comme une pluie dans tes yeux (2004–2012) ===
Created in 2004, Rain: comme une pluie dans tes yeux is the second chapter of the Trilogie du Ciel. Produced by Cirque Éloize and directed by Daniele Finzi Pasca, the show addresses themes of childhood, freedom, and family and combines contemporary circus arts, theatre, music, and dance in the staging. Rain exhibits several circus disciplines: jugglery, banquine, Russian bar, clown, Cyr wheel, teeterboard, tightrope, contortion, aerial silk, and hoop.

Rain has traveled across 178 cities and 20 countries. It has an original soundtrack composed by Maria Bonzanigo and Lucie Cauchon, costumes designed by Mérédith Caron, scenography by Guillaume Lord, and lighting by Martin Labrecque.

Rain was named as one of the 10 best shows presented in San Francisco in 2005 by Robert Hurwitt of the San Francisco Chronicle.

==== Awards and nominations ====
2006: Drama Desk Awards, New York City

- Nominated for Unique Theatrical Experience (Rain)
- Nomination for "Outstanding Director of a Musical (Daniele Finzi Pasca)

2005: Theatrical Management Association Awards

- Best Touring Production Award.

=== Typo (2003–2007) ===
Typo was produced by Cirque Éloize and staged and performed by Jamie Adkins.

=== Nomade: La nuit, le ciel est plus grand (2002–2006) ===
Created in 2002 and staged by Daniele Finzi Pasca, Nomade: La nuit, ciel est plus grand, is Cirque Éloize' fourth production and the first chapter of the Trilogie du Ciel. Song, music, dance, and acrobatics are used to discuss the vagabond spirit of man and his quest for adventure.

Lucie Cauchon's compositions are inspired by Romani music. The costumes, by Mérédith Caron, alternate between simple and sumptuous depending on the scene. Martin Labrecque did the lighting and Guillaume Lord did the scenography.

Nomade was presented in multiple theatres and international festivals, with over 700 total performances.

In 2007, it was part of the program representing the province of Quebec for three weeks during the Universal Forum of Cultures in Monterrey, Mexico.

==== Awards and nominations ====
2005: Prix Gémeaux

- Nominated for Best Variety Special or Scenic Arts Special (Pierre L. Touchette, Alain Simard)
- Nominated for Best Editing in Comedy, Variety, Scenic Arts (Patrice Bonenfant, François Bonnelly)

=== Cirque Orchestra (1999–2002) ===
In 1999, for the Lanaudière International Festival, Cirque Éloize produced Cirque Orchestra.

=== Excentricus (1997–2002) ===
Excentricus was performed by 17 artists: acrobats, jugglers, comedians, trapeze artists, and musicians.

Excentricus was presented over 500 times, including at the Edinburgh Festival in Scotland, the Israël Festival in Jerusalem, the Hong Kong Arts Festival in China, the Iberoamericano Teatro Festival of Bogotá, and the Recklinghausen Festival in Germany.

=== Cirque Éloize (1993–1997) ===
Cirque Éloize was the troupe's first show, at the time composed of seven artists from the Magdalen Islands who were still students of the National Circus School: Jeannot Painchaud, Daniel Cyr, Jano Chiasson, Robert Bourgeois, Damien Boudreau, Sylvette Boudreau, and Alain Boudreau.

Combining dance and acrobatics, the show was created in Dalhousie Station and then presented in the Magdalen Islands on the 11th and 12 August 1993 for CFIM-FM's 10th anniversary.

Three versions of the show were created between 1991 and 1994. The first two were made as part of a collective work involving all the artists in the process, under the direction of Jeannot Painchaud and with Catherine Archambault in charge of staging and choreography. Pierre Boileau joined the team for the third version of the staging.

== Associated Groups ==
Cirque Éloize had three subsidiaries: Éloize Entertainment, Éloize Studios, and Éloize Expo.

Cirque Éloize continues to produce and stage contemporary circus performances, while Éloize Entertainment focuses on major multidisciplinary projects, like the GCC opening ceremony in 2022. Éloize Studios produces events in Cirque Éloize's creative studio in the former Dalhousie Station in Montreal. Éloize Expo develops interactive and educational exhibitions.

In 2021, Éloize Expo produced its first interactive exhibition, Arctic: A Man Under the Ice, with visuals by diver and cinematographer Mario Cyr. Initially presented in its studio in Dalhousie Station, then at the Quebec City Convention Centre, before going to Saskatoon in 2022.

== Magdalen Islands theatre ==
In 2003, Cirque Éloize created the first circus arts festival in America, La Semaine des Arts du Cirque. Taking place during summer in the Magdalen Islands, three iterations of the festival were produced in total. Cirque Éloize is also co-founder of the Montréal Complètement Cirque festival.

By invitation from the chief director and curator of the Montreal Museum of Fine Arts, Nathalie Bondil, Jeannot Painchaud was chosen as one of 19 artists to participate in the Big Bang: carte blanche à la créativité exposition which was presented at the museum from November 6, 2011, to January 22, 2012.

In 2014, Jeannot Painchaud was the artistic director for the Paris en Scène 1889–1914 exposition, presented from June 2013 until February 2014 at the Musée de la civilisation in Québec. Paris en scène 1889–1914 earned the Prix Excellence – Groupe institutionnel 1 from the Société des musées québécois (SMQ).

In 2021, Painchaud put forward a proposal for a church in Havre-Aubert in the Magdalen Islands to be turned into a performance venue, that was accepted by the community and is now active.

== Other works ==
In 2006, the company created the Éloize Foundation which has a three-fold mission: to promote social reintegration of youth in crisis, to encourage youth to pursue specialized studies, and to contribute to the development of scenic arts. Artcirq, an Inuit circus performance organization based in Igloolik, Nunavut, is the first group to receive its support.

Cirque Éloize and Zone3 worked in collaboration for the production of La Vie Est Un Cirque's four-season broadcast in 2012. The series was shot in Cirque Éloize' studio, and they were in charge of the artistic direction, casting, and staging of the six episodes.
