= Gamma Phi Circus =

Gamma Phi Circus logo

Gamma Phi Circus, sponsored by Illinois State University, is the oldest collegiate circus in the United States. It began as the Gamma Phi fraternity, founded in 1929 by ISU gymnastics instructor Clifford "Pop" Horton. The fraternity's first circus performance took place in 1931. Gamma Phi Circus is a performing arts fraternal organization and is no longer affiliated with social fraternities or sororities and is a registered student organization.

== History ==
Gamma Phi Circus was founded in 1926 by Dr. Clifford Horton, who was a gymnastics instructor for Illinois State Normal University. The Gamma Phi fraternity was founded in 1926 and held the first Gamma Phi Circus performance in 1929 on the Illinois State University campus. The Bloomington-Normal community has had strong ties to circuses since the 1880s, and was home to the Flying Wards and the Conciellos, both trapeze acts. Women always performed in the Circuses and began to be formally initiated into the organization in 1939.

Circus alumni have gone on to perform in a variety of venues including the Shrine Circuses, the Circus Kingdom, Roberts Brothers Circus, Kelly Brothers Circus, the Great American Circus, and the Circus Alleluia. They have also performed at Disney World, Sea World, Busch Gardens, Universal Studios, Great America, and at Club Med Resorts. Members and alumni have also competed several times internationally in the Rhoenradturnen (Wheel Gymnastics) World Championships. In February 2017, five members competed in two acts at the first annual VivaFest, a circus competition in Las Vegas, Nevada. Lyric Hoop and Cyr Wheel received fourth place and Dance Trapeze received fifth. There were 37 acts in Gamma Phi Circus's category.

Gamma Phi Circus is also well known in the circus community for pushing boundaries of its amateur members. In April 2017 6 female teeterboard members (and the punchers) set a world record all-female 6-high stack. This was the first stack of this height to be performed completely by females. The members included: Karissa Diller (base), Alison Tye (middle), Alexandria Amos (middle), Megan Brawner (middle), Lauren Johnson (catcher), and Myer Hursey (flyer).

== Financial aspects ==
Gamma Phi Circus is an entirely self-financed organization supported by revenue from the home performances. "Home Shows" performed at Illinois State University draw visitors to the university. The Gamma Phi Circus also performs numerous exhibitions throughout the state and county that publicize the show and the university. The circus rents space from the university at full cost, buys or makes the costumes, and does maintenance and buys equipment for the rehearsal areas. Advertising is through TV, radio, newspapers, and brochures.

== Leadership and structure ==
Gamma Phi Circus leadership consists of three Directors and an Executive Board of students (appointed by the Directors). There are 6 members of the Executive Board, each with their own responsibilities (President, Vice President, Treasurer, Recording Secretary, Corresponding Secretary, Social Chair).

Gamma Phi Circus also has committees for students to participate in, each dividing the responsibility of operations onto the members. These committees include Equipment Crew, Props, Costumes, Concessions, Publicity, and Yearbook. There are also smaller subcommittee like Sound, Make-Up, Historian, and Stage Crew.

== Shows ==
Gamma Phi Circus performs "Home Shows" as well as exhibitions and road shows. Every April their Home Show at Redbird Arena usually consists of twenty or more acts and typically draws an audience of over 16,000 fans. Twenty to thirty road shows and exhibitions are also performed each year for schools, businesses, and charities. Over a number of years in Gamma Phi Circus 'history road show performances were performed across the state. Thea were approximately two hours long, and are performed in advance of the main Home Show. They perform double-duty as both a full circus performance and a preview and tune-up for the main show.
