= Ecole Supérieure des Arts du Cirque =

Circus school in Brussels, Belgium

Coordinates: 50°48′47.6996″N 4°17′45.2825″E

The École supérieure des Arts du Cirque (ESAC) is a professional circus school located in Brussels, Belgium. The Ecole Supérieure des Arts du Cirque de Bruxelles is one of very few colleges in the world to provide circus training leading to a diploma, along with the Centre National des Arts du Cirque de Châlons-en-Champagne in France, the Ecole Nationale de Cirque in Montreal, Canada, and the National Centre for Circus Arts in London, UK.

In September 2003, the college was officially recognized by the French Community of Belgium and became the 17th institute of Higher Education in the Arts.

ESAC offers a three-year course of study, at the end of which the student obtains a bachelor's degree in the performing arts and broadcasting and communication techniques, with a major in circus arts.

The circus disciplines taught at ESAC include specialised circus skills, dynamic and static acrobatics, trampoline, specific physical preparation, dance and theatre. The curriculum also includes courses in stage management for circus, circus engineering, law, arts production, science and applied science in the circus arts (anatomy, biomechanics and dietetics). The school's mission is to train artists who will be able to integrate their research and creation into the evolution of the contemporary circus, creating new forms and new approaches to collective creation.
