= École nationale de cirque =

Circus school in Montreal, Canada

Coordinates: 45°33′41″N 73°36′50″W

National Circus School
- École nationale de cirque
- Type: Circus arts training, academic subjects at the secondary and college, intensive summer camps
- Established: 1981
- Affiliations: Cité des Arts du Cirque; Cirque du Soleil and En Piste
- Location: Montreal, Quebec, Canada
- Website: ecolenationaledecirque.ca/en/

The National Circus School (French: École nationale de cirque) is a professional circus school located in Montreal, Quebec, Canada. It is for higher education in the art of circus. The NCS also offers academic subjects at the secondary and college levels. It is one of the only circus school in the Americas to offer professional programs in circus arts: Preparatory program, Circus and High School Studies, and Higher Education in Circus arts. It also prepares professional circus arts educators.

== History ==
In 1981 at the Immaculate Conception Center, a circus school begins to attract young artists interested in theatrical acrobatics. Soon the Immaculate Conception Center could no longer contain the rapid growth of the National Circus School (NCS). In 1989 the school moved to the Dalhousie station facilities in Old Montreal.

The NCS launched into a new phase of growth that sawe it relocating to the Cité des Arts du Cirque as a founding member, along with Cirque du Soleil and En Piste, the national network for circus arts. In 2003 the NCS completed the move to a new custom-made building, known as "Tohu".

In addition to circus arts training, the NCS also offers academic subjects at the secondary and college levels.

== Programs ==
=== Preparatory program ===
The first level of training, this extracurricular program is aimed at students 9 to 13 years old. This program allows students to continue their primary in another school. Disciplines taught during the program are dance, acting, physical training, manipulation, balancing, acrobatics and aerials.

=== Circus and High School Studies Program ===
This arts/academic program is offered to students in Grades 7 through 11. It combines required academic subjects as outlined by the Quebec secondary school curriculum with professional training in the circus arts. After obtaining their high school diploma, students pursue higher education through the Diploma of Collegial Studies in Circus Arts (DEC) program.

The following academic subjects are taught as outlined by the secondary teaching schedule of the Quebec Ministry of Education: French, English, mathematics, science and technology, human biology, geography, social studies, history, economics, career choice, morality instruction and personal and social development. Disciplines taught during the program are dance, acting, physical preparation, manipulation, balancing, acrobatics and aerials. French is the language of instruction for both academic subjects and circus art training. In addition, the School's French immersion program favors Canadian students who have not previously attended a French-language school.

=== Diploma of Collegial Circus School Studies ===
This 3-year program provides higher education in the circus arts and can lead directly to a professional career. Graduates receive a college diploma, Diploma of Collegial Studies in Circus Arts or DEC, from the Quebec Ministry of Education. Intended for Canadian and French students who have completed their high school studies, the program combines specialized training in the circus and theatre arts with a general college education.

The general education component includes courses in literature (French or English), philosophy and a second language. Specialized training in circus arts, technical courses: physical conditioning, dance, acting, voice and music, performance and creation as well as basic and advanced techniques of aerials, acrobatics, balancing and manipulation.

Theory courses: circus history, applied anatomy, methodology, health and safety, staging techniques and career management. Training is given in French.

=== Diploma of National Circus Studies ===
Intended exclusively for foreign students who have completed their high school studies, this 3-year program constitutes the final phase of higher education in the circus arts. Graduates receive a diploma from the School or DEE, as they prepare for a professional career. Specialized training includes courses in physical technique, dance, acting, voice and music, as well as the basic techniques for aerials, acrobatics, balancing and manipulation. Courses in theoretical and applied anatomy, nutrition, staging techniques and career management complement practical subjects. Students continue their training in the circus arts through courses in their chosen minor and/or major from among 5 disciplines: aerials, balancing, acrobatics, manipulation and clowning arts.

=== Intensive summer camps ===
This summer program in the form of a two-week intensive summer camp allows young people ages 13 to 17 to experience professional training in circus arts. Activities are scheduled 5 days a week, 6 hours per day, and represent a balance between learning physical techniques such as physical conditioning, flexibility, acrobatics, trampoline and "powertrack" with receiving an introduction to such circus arts as aerials, manipulation and balancing. Creative and acting workshops are among the many diverse activities that complement the training participants receive, culminating in performing before an audience.

=== Student services ===
The school offers a range of services such as on-campus housing, a library, a scholarship program, food services and health services.
