= Mina Liccione =

American performing artist

- Education: Marymount Manhattan College; New College of California
- Spouse: Ali Al Sayed

Comedy career
- Medium: Comedian, tap dancer, choreographer, arts educator
- Website: www.minaliccione.com

Mina Liccione (born Christina M. Liccione) is an American performing artist, comedian, tap dancer, choreographer, and arts educator.

== Early life and education ==
Liccione was born in Rochester, New York, but later moved to New York City as a teenager. At the age of three, Liccione's parents, Tony Liccione (former boxing promoter and president of the Rochester Boxing Hall of Fame), and Patty Liccione enrolled her in dance class. At age 13, she took her first job as a dance teacher's assistant, and by age 14, she was in the Performance Plus Dance Company and also a Flower City Rockette. While in high school at the age of 16, Liccione was accepted into the 3-1-3 program where she began to attend dance classes at the college level as part of the dance program at SUNY Brockport taught by Garth Fagan, the Tony Award winning choreographer of The Lion King.

At age 17, Liccione was awarded a scholarship to Marymount Manhattan College where she went on to major in dance. While attending college, Liccione started to take acting and comedy improv classes. Liccione minored in theater arts and also focused on choreography and dance composition.

Liccione went on to get her master's degree in experimental performance at the New College of California. During graduate school, Liccione was asked to be a core member of Velocity Circus. Liccione accepted and went on to be cast in lead roles for a series of shows by Velocity Circus including 'Heliosphere Jr.' and '1906'.

== Career ==
Liccione's appeared on the first season of MTV's dance show The Grind at the age of 17, where she went on to film eight episodes. Liccione also became a troupe member of the experimental performance art troupe J Mandle Productions, was cast in Cabaret off Broadway, was a back-up dancer for Candy and Deee-lite, performed and modeled with the House of Xtravaganza, and was cast by Japanese mime Yas Hakashima to be in his first ensemble based production. Liccione was also cast as a featured dancer in the film Cradle Will Rock directed by Tim Robbins and starring Susan Sarandon, Billy Murray, John Turturro, and Vanessa Redgrave.

=== Stomp ===
In October 1998, Liccione was cast in the Off-Broadway show Stomp. She performed with the New York cast until January 1999, and then went on tour with them until 2001. Liccione was on the USA National Tour and later a member of the European International Touring Company. In 2001, Stomp opened up a show in San Francisco and Liccione relocated there to be a part of the show.

=== Circus ===
While in San Francisco, Liccione was invited to attend the Clown Conservatory as part of the San Francisco School of Circus Arts, the only professional circus arts training school and the only one of its kind in the United States. Liccione was accepted and offered a partial scholarship to attend.

Before graduating, Liccione was invited to audition for a new show by Make*A*Circus named "Zoomorphia" and was cast as one of the leads. Upon accepting the role, Liccione also trained to be an aerialist on the static trapeze. Liccione performed a comedy aerial solo on their summer tour along with a one-woman band act. After the show closed, Liccione then was asked to audition for the New Pickle Circus in California. Liccione was cast as the lead ring mistress in their production of 'Circumstance' directed by Cirque Du Soleil stars Gypsy Snider and Shana Caroll.

During this time, Stomp was leaving San Francisco and asked Liccione if she would relocate Boston with the show. Liccione declined and decided to stay and focus on theatrical circus.

=== California ===
Liccione became the dance teacher at the San Francisco School of Circus Arts and was contracted to choreograph a number of theatrical circus shows around the Bay Area, as well as the Annual Bracebridge Dinner. Liccione wrote her first one-woman show entitled 'Della Pancha' which earned her an invitation to headline as part of the WOW Festival, where she won the 'best solo show' award. Liccione appeared in the National Lampoon's film 'Pucked' and was hired by Cirque Du Soleil to lead training workshops alongside Jeff Raz.

After completing her MA degree in Creative Inquiry with an emphasis on Experimental Performance, Liccione was offered a scholarship to continue on to earn her MFA Degree while building a new bridge program between New College of California and the Clown Conservatory offering the first USA degree in Theatrical Clowning. Liccione graduated with an MFA in Experimental Performance and Education, completing a thesis on the healing elements of humor and how comedy can be used as a tool to heal and unite people.

=== Comedy ===
Liccione also performed comedy throughout her career. She started doing improv comedy as a teen, then sketch and physical comedy as well as acting but it wasn't until later that she stumbled into stand-up comedy by accident. While hosting a large event in San Francisco there were technical difficulties. The organizer pushed Mina on stage shouting "do something funny!"

In 2008, Mina moved to Dubai to cofound Dubomedy (home to the MENA Region's first Comedy School) and pioneer a local comedy scene alongside comedian and producer Ali Al Sayed. Together they also founded Funny Girls MENA in 2010, the first all-female comedy troupe and tour in the Middle East.

Liccione has performed and taught comedy across the globe including: United States, Canada, Kuwait, Qatar, Scotland, Jordan, Greece, Italy, and Mexico. She has performed stand up with other comedians including Gabriel Iglesias, Dean Obeidallah, Tommy Davidson, Michael Winslow (of Police Academy), Aron Kader, Dean Edwards, Mo Amer, Bassem Youssef, and Russell Peters. She filmed her first 1-hour stand-up comedy special entitled "Araby by Nature" in Dubai in 2017, becoming the first female comedian to do so in the MENA region.

Liccione has been featured on Comedy Central Arabia and has also been seen on 'Stand-up Sketch Show' streaming on Shahid. In 2021, she debuted her new solo show. Her one-woman multimedia show entitled 'Growing Up Ringside' was directed by Ali Al Sayed.

=== The Clowns Who Care Project ===
Alongside Ali Al Sayed, Mina launched the Clowns Who Care Project. The project is a volunteer initiative aimed to bring awareness and support to centers for children and adults with special needs, senior centers, charity organizations and hospitals. Since launching the project Ali and Mina went on to lead performing arts workshops and perform in refugee camps throughout Jordan.

== Personal life ==
Liccione is married to Emirati comedian Ali Al Sayed. They reside in Dubai, where she works as a professional comedian and professor at the American University of Sharjah.
