= Josh Routh =

American circus and sideshow performer (born 1978)

- Born: September 27, 1978 (age 48)
- Website: www.joshuarouth.com

Josh Routh (born September 27, 1978) is an American circus performer, and a founding member of the comedic troop Brothers Kaputnik, Death By Tickle and Circus Kaput. Josh trained at the Circus Center in San Francisco, California and attended the Clown Conservatory where he graduated "Class Clown". As Tchotchke, his alter ego, Josh has performed with The New Pickle Circus (formerly the Pickle Family Circus, The San Francisco Youth Circus, The Much Ado Shakespeare Circus and Velocity Circus.

== Biography ==
Josh Routh grew up in a working-class neighborhood of Florissant in St. Louis, Missouri. In an interview with Wayne Keyser of Ballycast, he blames his circus career on his mother who didn't know what to do with him. He had many behavior and learning disabilities. She thought that clowning would fix it. He took a class on clown at age 12 and fell in love with it. By the age of 15 he began traveling with a carnival company on weekends and summers. By the age of 18 he had performed in 42 states.

In his early twenties he moved to San Francisco and trained at the Circus Center where he began forming what would one day be Circus Kaput. He was given the name Tchotchke Kaputnik by Peggy Ford, one of Ringling Brothers, Barnum and Bailey's earliest female clowns. Ms. Ford and master clown Jeff Raz shaped Tchotchke into a workable act.

After one year of training he began performing with the New Pickle Circus under the direction of Gypsy Snider and Shana Carroll two alums of the original Pickle Family Circus and Cirque Du Soleil. They had been creating a new kind of theatrical circus with their troupe Les 7 Doigts de la Main and were taking the Pickles in a new direction with their show Circumstance. The work he created with them informed his artistic aesthetic for years to come.

Two years later he moved back to St. Louis and began creating and directing his own shows under the banner of Circus Kaput in the circus ring at the City Museum. He mostly performed benefit shows with a small troupe. Slowly over the years momentum has grown and now Circus Kaput performs nationally for many kinds of events and festivals. In 2011 he was asked to take part in the Kennedy Centers VSA festival at the Smithsonian Museum in Washington, DC.

Aside from creating shows with Circus Kaput Josh's other performing projects include a comedy juggling and stunt show called Death By Tickle - Astounding Feats of Absurdity that ran for 9 years as the opening act of the St. Louis Shakespeare Festival.

In 2020 he authored the book Mind Blowing Presentations Using The Element Of Surprise. He is also an adjunct professor for Saint Louis University.

He is married to his business partner Ginger Routh.
