= Randall Lavender =

American contemporary artist

Interim President of Otis College of Art and Design
- In office March 2019 – May 2020
- Preceded by: Bruce Willis Ferguson
- Succeeded by: Charles Hirschhorn

Personal details
- Born: 1956 (age 69–70) California, United States
- Education: California State University, Fullerton (BA), Claremont Graduate University (MFA)
- Occupation: Visual artist, writer, educator, arts administrator.

Randall Lavender (born 1956), is an American visual artist, writer, educator, and arts administrator. He has exhibited nationally and internationally, and has worked in Los Angeles since the early 1980s. He was the interim president of Otis College of Art and Design, from 2019 to 2020, after holding academic leadership positions there for 15 years. His paintings and sculptures are included in numerous public and private collections.

== Life and education ==
Lavender was born and raised in Southern California. His father was novelist and musical composer William Lavender; his grandfather was Viennese émigré composer and USC music professor Ernest Kanitz and his wife Gertrud Kanitz. Lavender studied art at the Riverside, California, Art Museum and at John W. North High School in Riverside, California.

He attended California State University, Fullerton, where he studied ceramics and glassblowing with sculptor Jerry Rothman, earning a B.A. in Art in 1979. He completed an M.F.A. in Sculpture in 1981 at Claremont Graduate University in Claremont, California, under mentor Roland Reiss.

After graduate school, Lavender and his fellow student, sculptor John Frame, joined with architectural designer Eve Steele and artist/building contractor Lynn Roylance to develop a 14,000sf artists-in-residence project in the part of downtown Los Angeles that became known as the "L.A. art colony." In 1981, Lavender moved to Vanderbilt University in Nashville, Tennessee, where he was Assistant Professor and developed the school’s first sculpture curriculum and studio space.

Lavender returned to his Los Angeles studio in 1983, later relocating it to the Santa Fe Art Colony.

== Painting and sculpture ==
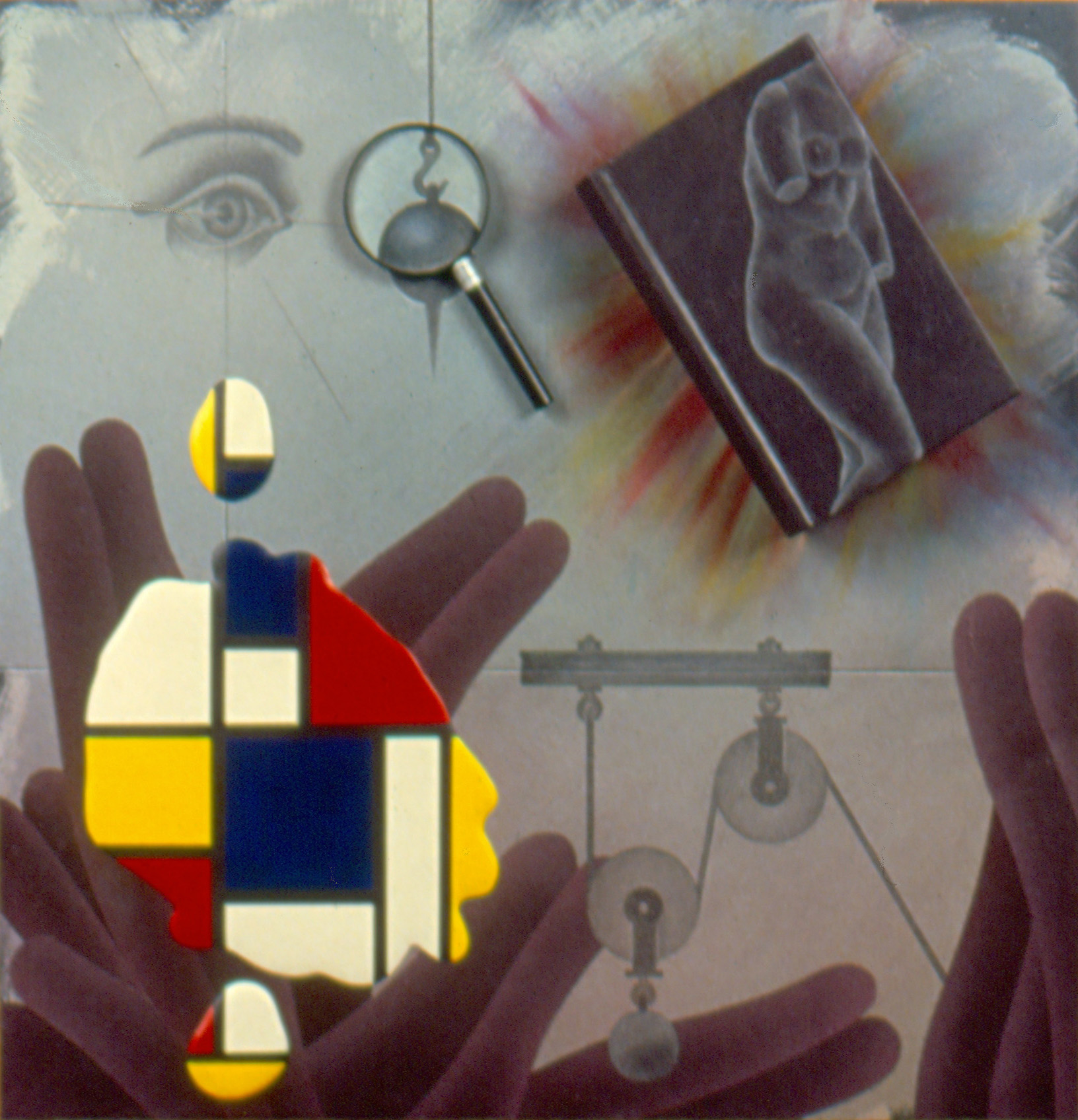
Conflicting Ideals: Visual Mechanics, 23" x 23", oil, acrylic, pastel, and graphite on wood, plaster, and aluminum, 1983 (private collection)

Lavender’s work displayed stylistic evolution over the years. Early works, featured in Newcomers '79 at Los Angeles' Municipal Art Gallery, were painted figurative tableaux blending two-dimensional imagery with three-dimensional form, and including "sculptural objects that combined contrasting materials." His 1981 move to Vanderbilt began "a crucial time of reevaluation and reexamination in his artistic development ... [and] an integration in his work," as he shifted to mixed-media tableaux and pictorial works with reliefs, in “an overall dissolution of media boundaries." One critic saw the pieces as "psychological dramas in which … ideas are realized through a variety of media ... [that] allude to the diversity of human nature ...." The work included three series of sculptural and pictorial tableaux: Frames of Mind explored the five stages of grief discussed by Elisabeth Kübler-Ross. Conflicting Ideals focused on four systems of idealization—art, nature, science and technology. An unnamed series set the international symbols for Man and Woman in unexpected scenarios.

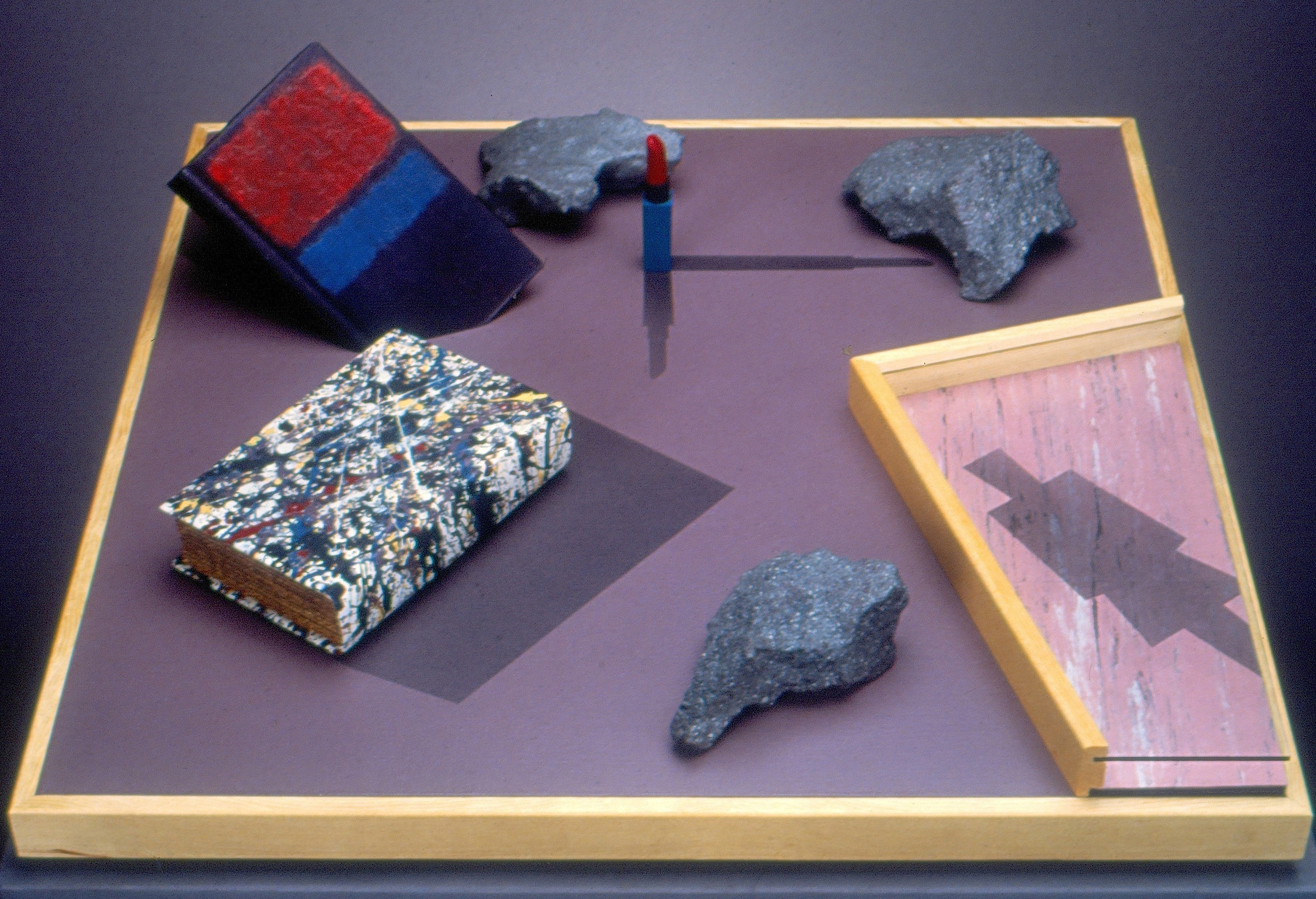
Conflicting Ideals: Empty Set, 23" x 23" x 6", oil and acrylic on wood, aerofoam, plaster, and glass, 1982, (private collection)

Travel to Italy and study of works by the Old Masters gave Lavender new inspiration, and also raised questions about late Modernism's penchant for throwing out the "old" in favor of the "new." He began exploring the Western traditional language of realist figurative painting in embodying contemporary themes, working with oil on panel. In 1986 Lavender joined with L.A. art dealer Jan Turner, who hosted a solo exhibition of his new paintings as a West Coast counterpart to New York's emerging neoclassicism. The work was said by Los Angeles Times art critic William Wilson to show that “something as presumably cerebral as conceptual art has roots in emotion ... [making] the point that universal myth and private striving are the same thing." Lavender joined Tortue Gallery in Santa Monica, California, in 1988. Along with Lavender’s human figures, subsequent paintings began to feature architectural, landscape, and animal subjects, such as “Owl,” reproduced in the art-historical anthology ZOO: Animals in Art.

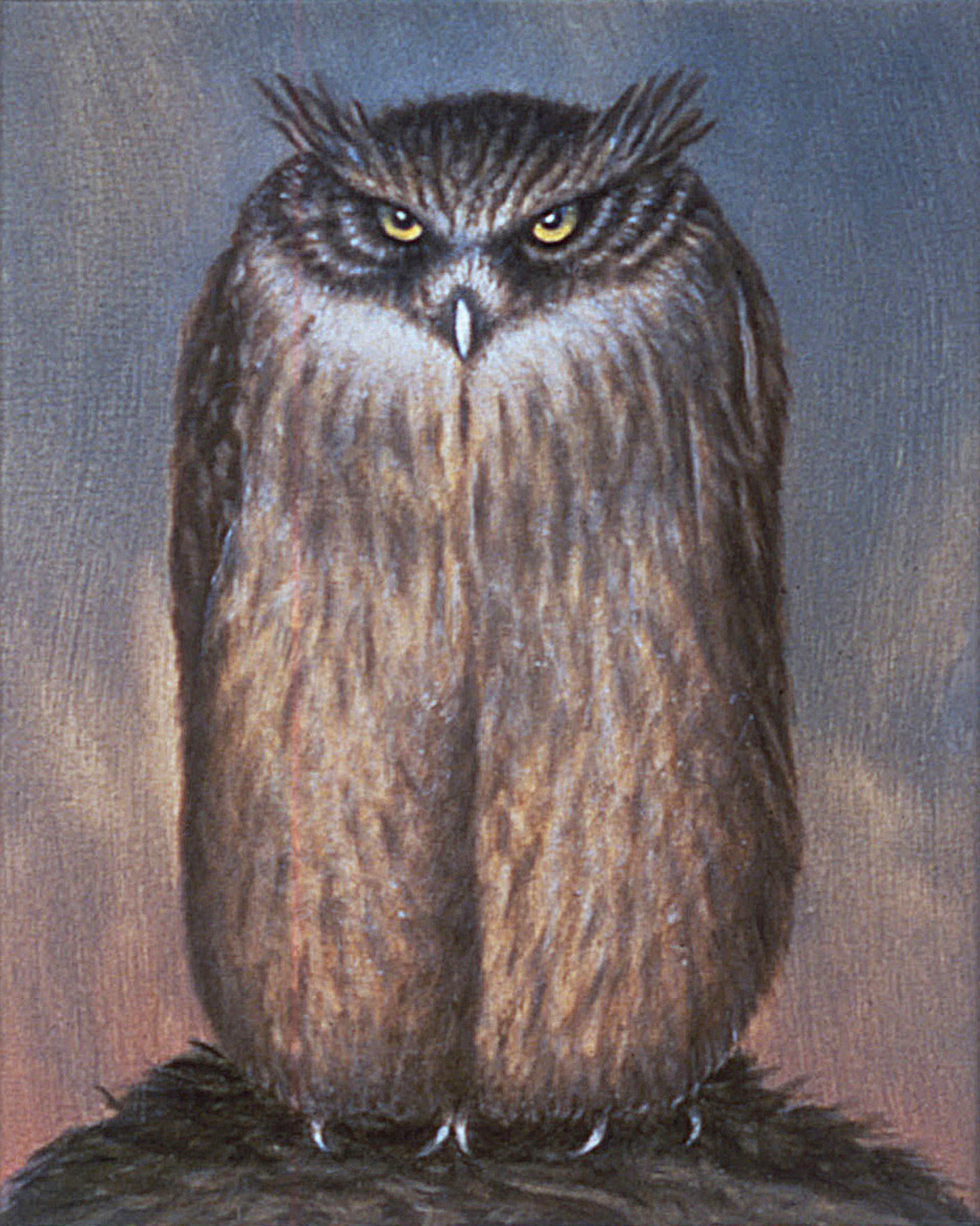
Owl, 14" x 12", oil on panel, 1992 (private collection)

In 1994 Lavender was one of seven artists in beyondappearance, an exhibition "presenting gifted L.A. artists who get less than their due because of the prejudice of fashion .... All place high value on traditional craftsmanship .... address[ing] aspects of life and art that are timeless and without conscious style." Lavender’s work In beyondappearance were seen by one critic as "the wry conversion of clinical study to poignant fable ... the outcome of a dialectic between observed truth and latent enigma ...."

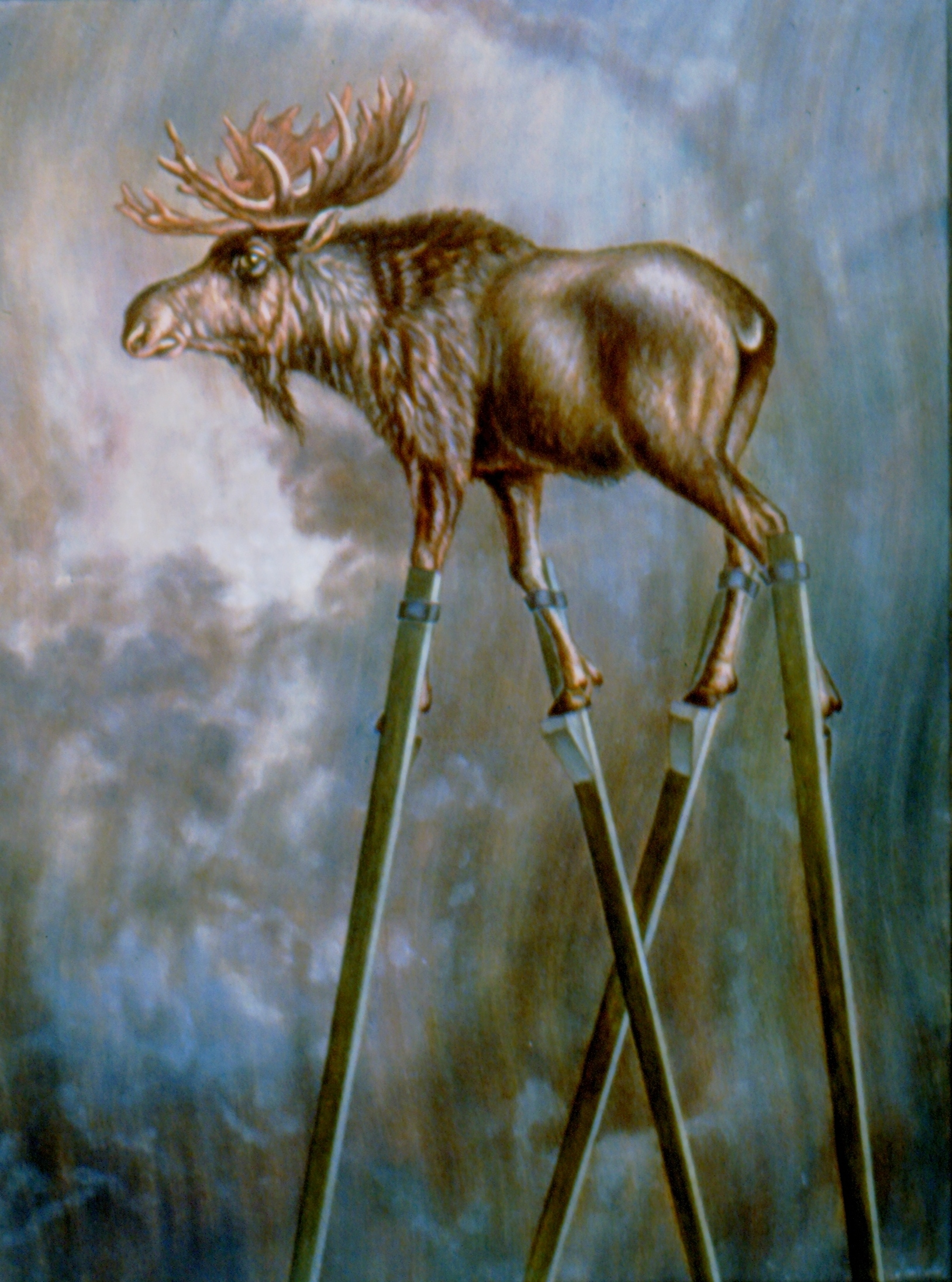
Moose on Stilts, 50” x 39”, oil on panel, 1992 (private collection)

== Teaching and research ==
Lavender joined the faculty of Otis College of Art and Design in 1983, teaching in their Foundation (first year) program. Seeing the variations in his students’ learning processes led him to research, and to publish on, learning theory and its applications in the art studio-classroom. His work on three-dimensional design curricula, in FATE in Review: Foundations in Art Theory and Education (2001), held that aesthetic fundamentals (formal training) and accompanying skill-building are crucial to the early phase of an artist's or designer's higher education. A broader view of design education issues, looking also at two-dimensional design curricula, appeared in "The Subordination of Aesthetic Fundamentals in College Art Instruction" in Journal of Aesthetic Education (2003). Further research focused on educational psychology and attribution theory, during which Lavender conducted a formal study centered on a cohort of college art and design students. With two psychologists, Selena T. Nguyen-Rodriguez, Ph.D. and Donna Spruijt-Metz, Ph.D., he published "Teaching the Whole Student: Perceived Academic Control in College Art Instruction" in Studies in Art Education: A Journal of Issues and Research (2010). Lavender also contributed to a volume of essays published for fashion design students, writing on the meaning of jeans in Garb: A Fashion and Culture Reader(2007).

Lavender served as Assistant and Associate Chair in the Otis Foundation Program, and as Professor. In 2005 he was honored with the Otis College Teaching Excellence Award.

== Higher education leadership ==
In 2010 Lavender was appointed Interim Co-Provost at Otis College, along with colleague Debra Ballard. A year later he became Vice Provost, teaming with incoming College Provost Kerry Walk, Ph.D. He led Otis campus planning for a major expansion that added new studios, shop space, classrooms and student housing facilities. After Dr. Walk became Interim President in 2014, Lavender became Provost. He testified before the California Legislative Joint Committee on the Arts on the Otis Report on the Creative Economy, led the College's first academic collective bargaining, and developed a new comprehensive academic plan and strategic planning process. He left the Provost position late in 2018 to return to his studio.

In March 2019, Lavender was asked by the Otis College's board of trustees to become interim president, following Bruce Willis Ferguson; a role he served in until May 2020. He shepherded to completion the school's new five-year college strategic plan; its successful WASC and NASAD re-accreditation reviews, and recruitment for a new provost and a CFO. In early 2020, Lavender led the Otis response to COVID-19 and state-mandated shutdowns, including campus closure, a switch to online education, and conversion of end-of-school-year Annual Exhibition and Commencement ceremonies to virtual form. He was succeeded as president of Otis College by Charles Hirschhorn on June 1, 2020.

Lavender was named professor emeritus at Otis College in 2021.

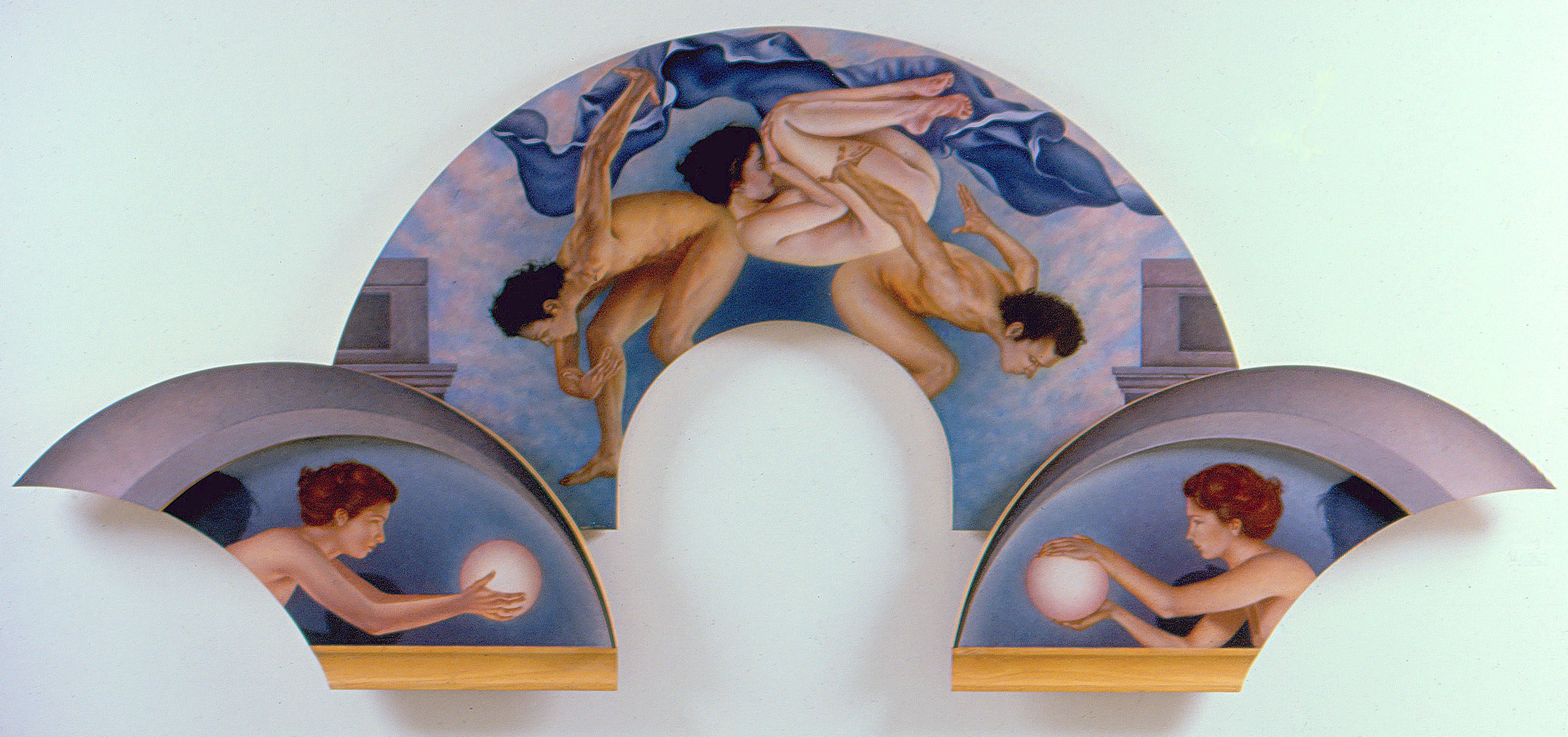
The Beckoning, 5’ x 11', oil on panel, 1985-86 (private collection)

== Exhibitions ==
Selected solo shows

- 1995, 1993, 1991, 1989 Tortue Gallery, Santa Monica, California
- 1990 Riverside Art Museum, Riverside, California
- 1987 Jan Turner Gallery, Los Angeles, California
- 1984 Art Gallery, Santa Monica College, Santa Monica, California
- 1983 Conflicting Ideals, Fine Arts Center at Cheekwood, Nashville, Tennessee

Selected group shows

- 2010 Selections from the Permanent Collection, Groves Gallery, Oceanside Museum of Art, Oceanside, California.
- 2000 Representing L.A.; Pictorial Currents in Contemporary Southern California Art, Frye Art Museum, Seattle, Washington; 2001 Art Museum of South Texas, Corpus Christi, Texas.
- 1996 Imaginary Realities: Surrealism Then and Now, Louis Stern Fine Arts, Los Angeles, California.
- 1995 beyondappearance, Oliver Art Center, California College of Arts, Oakland, California.
- 1994 beyondappearance, Armory Center for the Arts, Pasadena, California.
- 1989 California Artists from the Frederick R. Weisman Foundation Collection, Phinney Gallery, Annenberg Art Wing, Palm Springs Art Museum, Palm Springs, California.
- 1987 Contemporary Humanism: Reconfirmation of the Figure, Visual Arts Center, California State University, Fullerton.
- 1986 Selections from the Frederick R. Weisman Foundation Collection, Centre National des Arts Plastiques, Paris, France.
- 1986 Museu Calouste Gulbenkian, Lisbon, Portugal

Collections holding works by Lavender include the Frederick R. Weisman Foundation, Oceanside Museum of Art, and Laguna Art Museum as well as many private collections. He also held part-time teaching positions at Claremont Graduate University and California State Polytechnic University, Pomona.
