= Marymount Manhattan College =

Former private college in Manhattan, New York

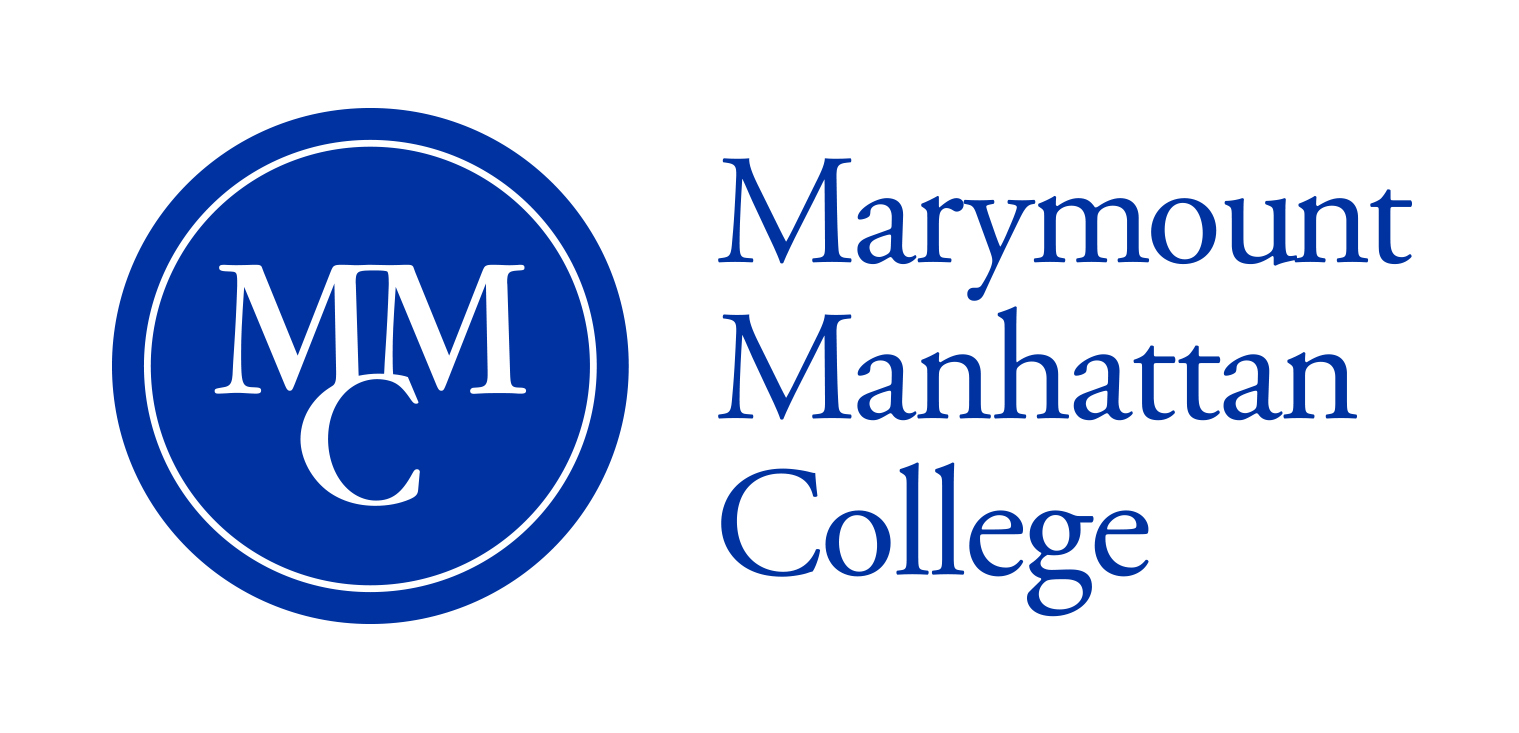
- Motto: Tua Luce Dirige
- Motto in English: Direct Us By Thy Light
- Type: Former private college
- Active: 1936–2026 (merged into Northeastern University)
- Parent institution: Northeastern University
- Religious affiliation: Formerly Catholic
- Endowment: $18.1 million
- Faculty: 92 full-time faculty
- Undergraduates: 2,069 (2017)
- Location: New York, New York, United States; 40°46′7″N 73°57′35″W
- Campus: Urban
- Colors: Blue and white
- Mascot: Griffin
- Website: www.mmm.edu

Marymount Manhattan College (MMC) was a private college on the Upper East Side of Manhattan, New York City. Founded in 1936, it operated as an independent institution until 2026, when it merged into Northeastern University and was renamed Northeastern University – New York City, becoming the 14th campus in Northeastern's global university system. As of 2020, enrollment consisted of 1,571 undergraduate students with women making up 80% and men 20%.

== History ==
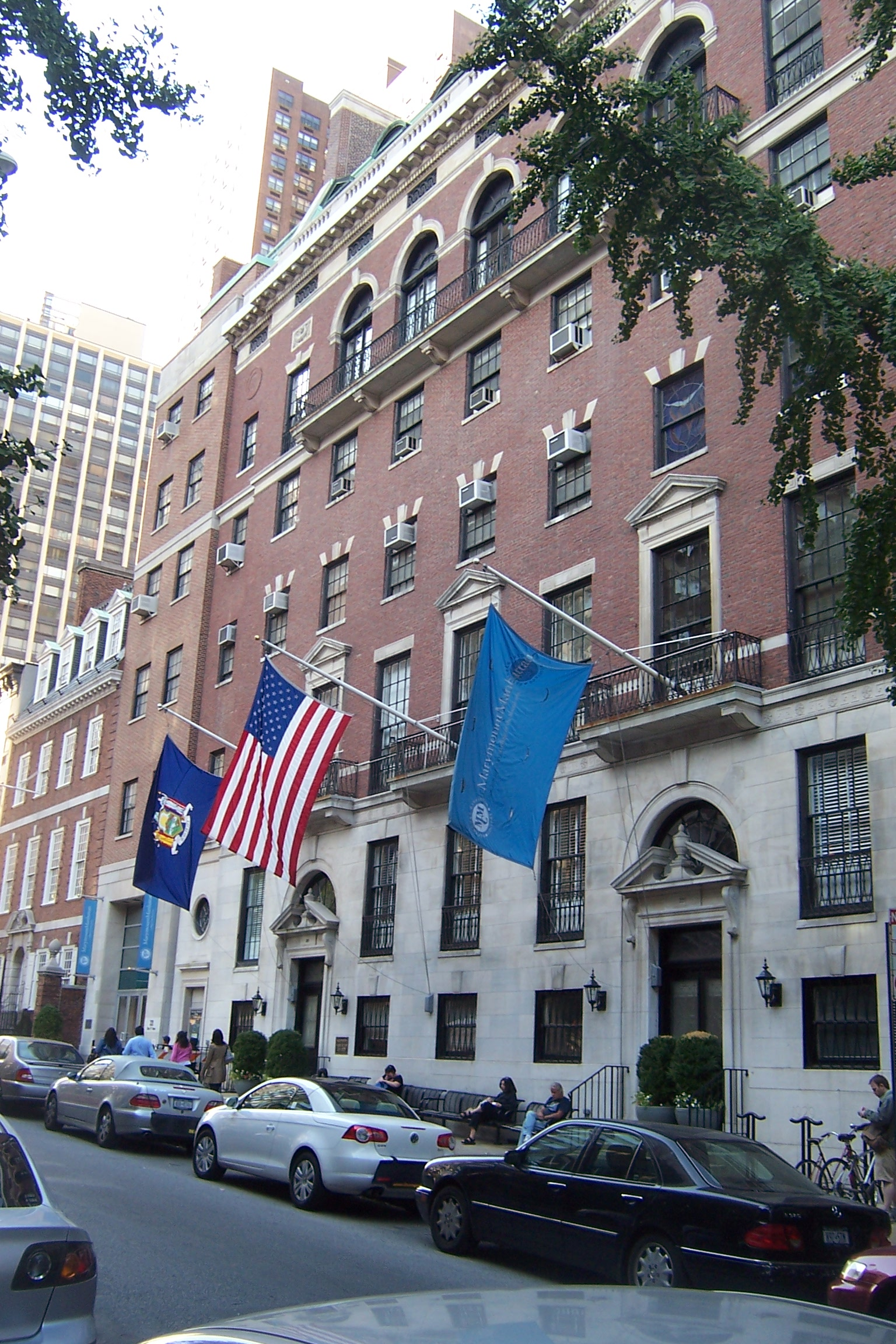
Marymount Manhattan College

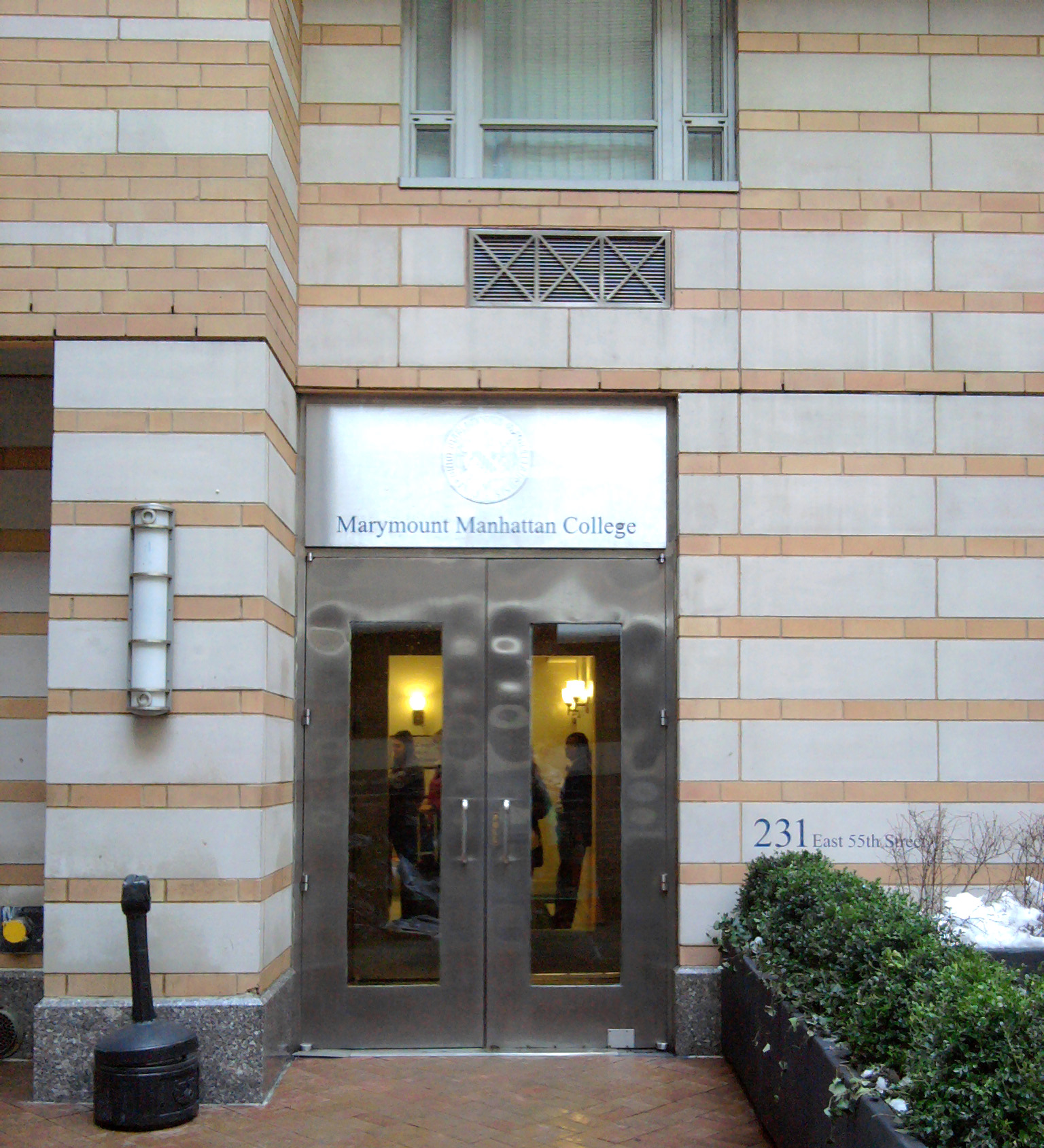
55th Street entrance

Marymount Manhattan College was founded in 1936 by the Religious of the Sacred Heart of Mary as a two-year women's college and a New York City extension of Marymount College in Tarrytown, New York. In 1948, the college moved to its present location on East 71st Street and became a four-year bachelor's degree-granting college; the first class graduated from MMC in 1950. In 1961, MMC was granted an absolute charter as an independent four-year college by the Regents of the University of the State of New York.

In 1976, Finch College, a women's college best known as a "finishing school" for affluent young women, closed and passed its records over to the school. The school was most famous for educating Tricia Nixon Cox, daughter of former US President Richard Nixon.

In 1990, Regina Peruggi became Marymount's first lay president. In 2003, the college's mezzanine was renamed in her honor. In 2001, the college opened the 55th Street Residence Hall, one of the tallest dorms in the United States, with 32 floors of student housing in a 46-story building.

The Cardinal Newman Society protested the college's 2005 decision to invite then-Senator Hillary Clinton to deliver a commencement address and receive an honorary doctoral degree, due to Clinton's longtime public support for abortion rights. The archdiocese thereafter moved to have the college removed from the Official Catholic Directory, rendering the school officially non-Catholic. In response, the school, which continued to be listed in the directory, claimed to already be a non-sectarian institution.

In 2015, Marymount Manhattan opened a second residence hall for upperclassmen located in Cooper Square, a 12-story building to house 270 students In 2017, just under 2,000 students were enrolled representing 48 U.S. states and 36 countries. In conjunction with its core liberal arts curriculum, Marymount Manhattan offers 30 major programs of study and over 40 minors along with pre-professional programs. It is accredited by the Middle States Association of Colleges and Secondary Schools. The college offers a degree program for incarcerated women at the Bedford Hills Correctional Facility, granting an Associates of Arts degree in social science and Bachelor of Arts degree in sociology.

In 2013, the school was featured in the industry publication Backstage as one of the top colleges in which Broadway and Tony Award-nominated actors have trained, alongside Carnegie Mellon University, Oberlin Conservatory, University of Michigan, Ithaca College, NYU's Tisch School of the Arts, and the University of North Carolina School of the Arts.

In July 2015, Kerry Walk was unanimously selected by the Trustees of Marymount Manhattan College as the school's eighth president. Walk resigned effective June 2023 to become president of the University of the Arts, which closed a year later. On May 29, 2024, media sources announced that Marymount Manhattan College would be merging with Northeastern University as part of its Global University System, under which the college would be renamed Northeastern University – New York City.

The Middle States Commission on Higher Education approved the merger in April 2025, and the New York State Education Department authorized it in May 2025. The United States Department of Education approved the change of ownership in November 2025 and gave final approval on July 9, 2026, at which point New York State converted the new institution's provisional charter into an absolute charter, completing the merger. Approximately 1,000 students enrolled at the college became Northeastern students without changes to their tuition.

== Notable alumni ==
Alumni include prominent actors, musicians, attorneys, writers, journalists, royalty, the first female nominee for Vice President of the United States from a major party, and recipients of the Olympic Gold Medal, Tony Award, Emmy Award, and Grammy Award.

- Emin Agalarov, Azerbaijani-Russian pop star, businessman, and son of Aras Agalarov
- Annaleigh Ashford, actress, singer, and dancer
- Candace Bailey, actress and presenter
- Maddie Baillio, actress and singer
- Melissa Benoist, actress and singer
- Lana Cantrell, singer and entertainment lawyer
- Marie Corridon, competition swimmer and Olympic champion
- Laverne Cox, actress
- Alexandra Daddario, actress
- Desmond Devenish, filmmaker and actor
- Geraldine Ferraro, United States vice-presidential candidate (1984)
- Joan Fitz-Gerald, former president of the Colorado Senate
- Travis Flores, American activist, philanthropist, motivational speaker, actor and children's book author
- Ita Ford, Maryknoll Sister martyred in El Salvador in 1980
- Tali Golergant, Luxembourgish singer and grand finalist in the Eurovision Song Contest 2024
- Marianne Githens, political scientist, feminist, and author
- Spencer Grammer, actress
- Katharine Sweeney Hayden, U.S. District Judge for the District of New Jersey
- Missy Hyatt, professional wrestling valet, commentator, model, and professional wrestler
- Mimi Imfurst, drag queen, actor, singer
- Moira Kelly, actress
- Mina Liccione, performing artist
- Kelly-Anne Lyons, actress
- Princess Marie of Denmark, wife of Prince Joachim of Denmark, second son of Margrethe II of Denmark
- Sallie Manzanet-Daniels, Associate Justice of the Appellate Division of the Supreme Court, First Judicial Department
- Cindy Meehl, documentary filmmaker
- Bunny Michael, visual artist, musician, and rapper
- Julianne Michelle, actress
- Erik Palladino, actor
- Manny Pérez, film and theatre actor
- Kelly Piquet, model, columnist and blogger
- Andrew Rannells, actor and singer
- Melissa Rauch, comedian, writer, and actress
- Emmy Raver-Lampman, actor
- Regina Richards, singer
- Rose Ann Scamardella, former television news anchor
- Paige Spara, actress
- Tika Sumpter, actress
- Jenna Ushkowitz, actress
- Adrienne Warren, actress and singer

== See also ==
- List of defunct colleges and universities in New York
