= Charles Hirschhorn =

American producer and media executive

President of Otis College of Art and Design
- Incumbent
- Assumed office June 1, 2020
- Preceded by: Randall Lavender (interim)

Personal details
- Born: Charles Joseph Hirschhorn Chicago, Illinois, U.S.
- Education: Harvard College (B.A.)

Charles Hirschhorn is an American media executive, film and television producer, and academic administrator. He is currently serving as the president of Otis College of Art and Design in Los Angeles, since 2020.

== Early life and education ==
Hirschhorn grew up in Chicago. He graduated from Harvard College in 1979 with a B.A. degree in economics.

== Career ==
=== Fox Broadcasting Company ===
In 1987 Hirschhorn was named vice president of development for the Fox Broadcasting Company, where he supervised the network's prime-time development projects. He helped develop the Emmy Award winning sketch comedy television series In Living Color.

=== The Walt Disney Company ===
Hirschhorn began his tenure at The Walt Disney Company as executive vice president of Hollywood Pictures. Under his leadership, the studio released over twenty films, including The Joy Luck Club, The Santa Clause, and Quiz Show. In 1997 Hirschhorn was named president of Walt Disney Television and executive vice president of Walt Disney Motion Pictures Group. During this tenure he relaunched The Wonderful World of Disney and oversaw the development of seventeen movies, including Rogers and Hammerstein's Cinderella and Life-Size.

=== G4 network ===
In 2000, Hirschhorn founded G4, a cable television network focused on video games. Hirschhorn was intrigued by the work video game developers were doing with animation. He was also motivated by the enthusiasm around events such as E3. He served as the company's CEO from 2000 - 2005 and oversaw the channel's official launch in 2002.

=== Retirement Living TV ===
In 2007, Hirschhorn was appointed COO of Retirement Living TV, a cable television network focused on programming for senior citizens.

=== AEG Television ===
As president of AEG Television, Hirschhorn launched and co-managed AXS TV, a cable television channel focused on live music and entertainment programming.

=== Otis College of Art and Design ===
In February 2020, Hirschhorn was announced as the new president of Otis College of Art and Design. His term officially began June 1. He was preceded in the role by interim president Randall Lavender, in March 2019 to May 2020; and by the earlier president Bruce Willis Ferguson (1946–2019).
