= Circus Kaput =

Circus Kaput is an intimate theatrical circus and entertainment company based in St. Louis, Missouri, United States, it began as show that benefitted non-profit social causes. It was started by Josh Routh in 2003. Circus Kaput performances have different type of acts: street performance, classic circus, dance, and comedy. Acts include: contortionists, jugglers, clowns, and aerialists. Circus Kaput has been featured on NBC, American Broadcasting Company and Fox affiliate television stations. In 2004 they were the featured performers for Major League Baseball's official World Series Gala for the players of the Boston Red Sox and the St. Louis Cardinals. But Circus Kaput, also does small show for fairs, festivals, college shows, corporate events, company events, church picnics, birthdays, weddings, bar/bat mitzvahs and alike. Circus Kaput has traveled and tours in the US and abroad. Circus Kaput has a rehearsal space in Chesterfield Mall.
