= Jeff Raz =

American clown

Jeff Raz is an American clown, actor, teacher, and director. He founded and served as director of the Clown Conservatory in San Francisco, California, the country's only remaining professional clown training program from 2000 to 2010. As a performer he has had leading roles with Vaudeville Nouveau, Make*A*Circus, Pickle Family Circus, and Cirque du Soleil.

== Background ==
Raz grew up in Berkeley, California, in the 1970s.

== Roles ==
A large man, Raz has a long running collaboration with five-foot-tall clown Diane Wasnak as "Pino and Razz". The pair performed, among other places, as leads in the Pickle Family Circus.

Raz toured in 2007 as the "Dead Clown", the lead in Cirque du Solei's production, Corteo. In 2009 he reprised this role in Tokyo, Nagoya, and Osaka Japan http://www.jeffraz.com/

Raz is part of the new circus movement—circuses without animals. He is an admirer of Charlie Chaplin, Wavy Gravy, Bill Irwin.

Raz performed in the Flying Karamazov Brothers' Broadway production of The Comedy of Errors.

In the summer of 2011, he played Aristophanes/Playwright in his play The Road to Hades, performed by the Shotgun Players of Berkeley, California. He recently performed with California Revels.

== Other work ==
Raz has taught at the Ringling Bros. and Barnum & Bailey Clown College and the San Francisco School of Circus Arts. He wrote solo plays Father-Land, about a secular Jew's understanding of the Holocaust, and Birth Mark, about adoption. He has written two books The Secret Life of Clowns: A backstage tour of Cirque du Soleil and The Clown Conservatory and The Snow Clown: Cartwheels on Borders from Alaska to Nebraska.

== Personal life ==
Raz describes himself as "very political". He is married to Sherry Sherman, a psychologist. The couple has two children, Micah, and Joshua.
