= Desmond Devenish =

British-American actor

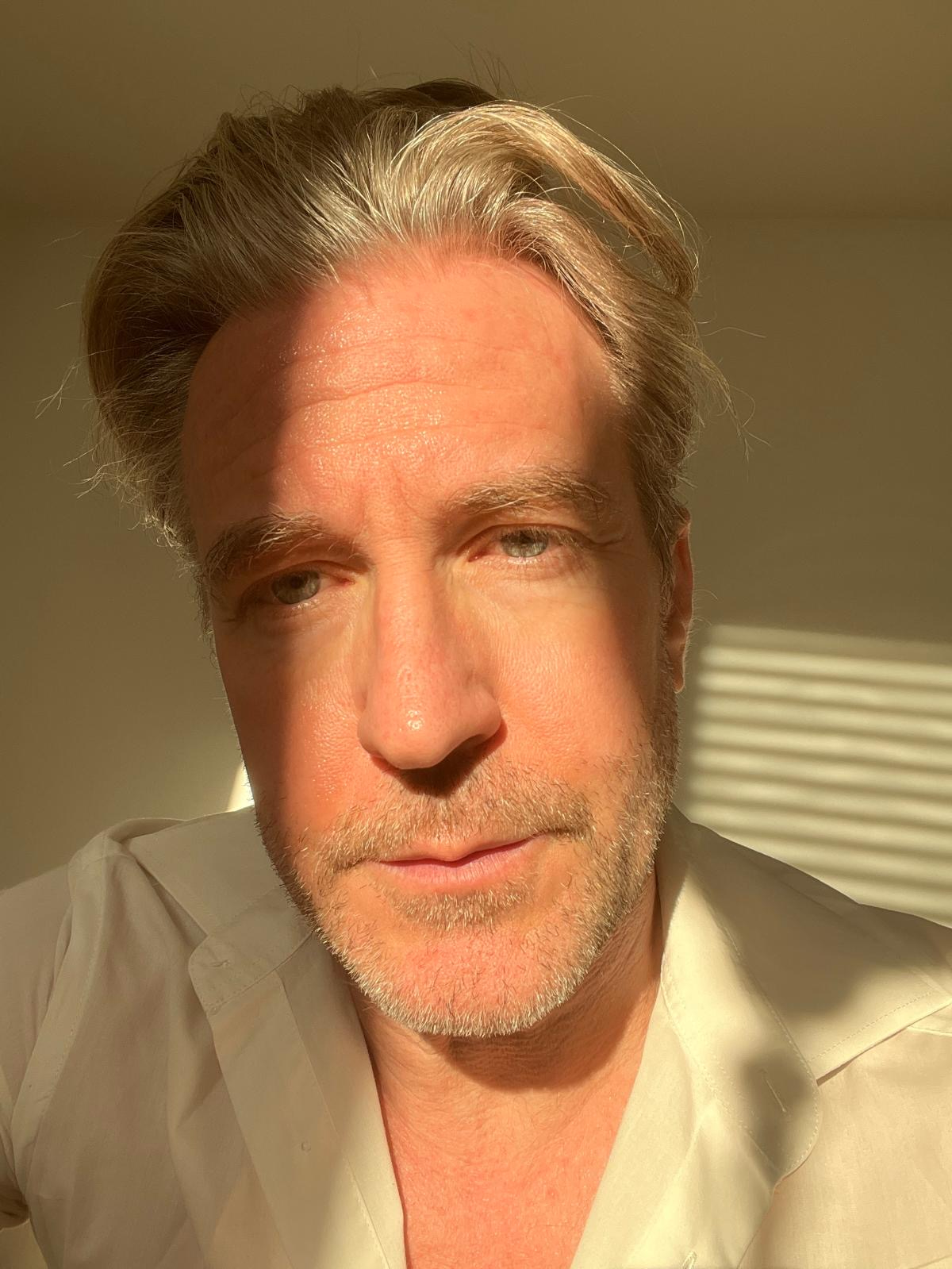
- Born: Desmond Thomas Devenish; New York City, New York, U.S.
- Education: Marymount Manhattan College
- Occupation: Filmmaker · Producer · Writer

Desmond Thomas Devenish is a British-American writer, director, actor, and producer.

== Early life ==
Devenish was born in Manhattan, New York City to Louise Devenish (née Mellion), appraiser and professor of fine and decorative arts and Thomas Devenish, a New York dealer of fine English furniture, born in England to parents who were vaudevillians.

Among the schools Devenish attended were Saint David's School (New York City), Riverdale Country School, John F. Kennedy High School (New York City), Tisch School of the Arts at New York University, Marymount Manhattan College, where he received his BA in Theatre Arts, and The Los Angeles Film School.

== Theatre ==
Devenish performed in the Broadway production of On the Waterfront at The Brooks Atkinson Theatre, which starred Ron Eldard, Penelope Ann Miller, David Morse and James Gandolfini.
In 2025, Devenish wrote, directed, and performed The Forum, a raw and intimate solo theatre piece exploring themes of belief, betrayal, and the cost of conviction. The show premiered at the Edinburgh Festival Fringe.

== Film ==
While still in high school, Devenish landed the lead role in Delinquent, directed by Peter Hall. He also starred in Exit 8A which ran at Sundance and The LA Film Festival.

As a filmmaker, his LA Film School thesis, Split, was acquired by Shorts International. His second short Closure won best short at San Pedro International Film Festival. Devenish's feature film directorial debut, Misfortune, a gritty thriller shot in Tucson, Arizona won the Yellow Rose at Jaipur International Film Festival, best feature at Black Hills Film Festival, and was nominated for the Grand Jury Award at Dances With Films. Misfortune was theatrically released in a dozen U.S. markets, and is distributed by Entertainment One.

Eddie & Sunny, Devenish's sophomore feature, which stars Gabriel Luna and Joanna Vanderham, centers on an impulsive loving homeless family, who commit a cartel-related homicide, leaving them and their child fugitives in pursuit of safe harbor. Silvio Muraglia and Andrea Iervolino have helmed on producing the project, filmed in Ostia, Italy and Guatemala.

== Television ==
Stretch It Out!, a comedy special, written and performed by Shawn Pelofsky and directed by Devenish, is distributed by Comedy Dynamics.

== Books ==
- Devenish, Desmond (2022). Freedom From Failure: A 10-Step Guide to Actionably Transform Painful Setbacks into Life-Defining Triumphs. Kindle Direct Publishing. ISBN 979-8417254758.

== Stage ==
Opening date	Closing date	Title	Role	Playwright	Theatre	Notes
12 April 1995	7 May 1995	On The Waterfront	Little Frankie	Budd Schulberg	Brooks Atkinson	

== Filmography ==
=== Film ===
Year	Film	Credited as				
Year	Film	director	screenwriter	Producer	Actor	Role
1995	Delinquent				Yes	Tim
2004	Exit 8A (short film)				Yes	Nick
2009	Split (short film)	Yes	Yes	Yes		
2013	Closure (short film)	Yes	Yes	Yes	Yes	Jude
2016	Pull Away (short film)	Yes	Yes	Yes	Yes	Vincent
2016	Gregory Porter Don't Forget Your Music			Associate producer		
2016	Misfortune	Yes	Yes	Yes	Yes	Boyd
2017	Happy Birthday or Felicidades (short film)			Associate producer		
2018	Stretch It Out	Yes				
2020	Eddie & Sunny	Yes	Yes	Yes		
