= Kerry Walk =

American academic administrator

5th President of University of the Arts
- In office August 1, 2023 – June 4, 2024
- Preceded by: David Yager

President of Marymount Manhattan College
- In office 2015–2023

Personal details
- Education: Wellesley College (BA); University of California, Berkeley (MA, PhD)

Kerry Walk is a former American academic administrator, teacher, and college president. She served as the fifth president of University of the Arts in Philadelphia from 2023 to 2024, and resigned three days before its closure. She was the president of Marymount Manhattan College from 2015 to 2023, having begun a process leading to Marymount Manhattan being absorbed into Northeastern University.

== Career ==
Walk was director of the writing center Harvard University and Princeton University, and held staff positions at Pitzer College.

She served as provost at the Otis College of Art and Design in Los Angeles from 2011 to 2014, and interim President from 2014 to 2015.

From 2015 to 2023, Walk was the president of Marymount Manhattan College in New York City, during which time she initiated an agreement with Northeastern University to take over Marymount Manhattan due to its financial difficulties.

== University of the Arts ==
In April 2023, Walk was appointed president of the University of the Arts, beginning her tenure in August 2023. Less than a year later, on May 31, 2024, President Walk announced the closing of UArts on June 7, 2024, with less than a week's notice. She announced her resignation shortly thereafter on June 4, 2024 after dodging questions from students and faculty.
