= John Frame (sculptor) =

American sculptor

Mr R from "The Tale of the Crippled Boy: Three Fragments of a Lost Tale," 2011

John Fayette Frame (born November 27, 1950) is an American sculptor, photographer, composer and filmmaker. He has been working as an artist in California since the early 1980s. Frame has been given Grants and Awards from the National Endowment for the Arts, the J. Paul Getty Museum, and the Los Angeles County Museum of Art. He has participated in group exhibitions around the world and has had major solo exhibitions at the Los Angeles County Museum of Art, the Long Beach Museum of Art, and the Huntington Library, Art Collections, and Botanical Gardens. After five years of preparation, Part One of "The Tale of the Crippled Boy", a sweeping project incorporating sculpture, photography, installation, music and film, premiered at the Huntington Library in San Marino, California in March 2011.

== Life ==
Frame was born in Colton, California. His father, Rudolph Randolph Frame, had only a third-grade education and was a welder and sheet metal worker for the Santa Fe Railway. His mother, Mildred Louise Frame (née Jones) was a cook in a local middle school. He has two siblings, Robert Wayne Frame (born 1931) and Phyllis Louise Frame Runyon (born 1943). After his graduation from the Colton School District, he attended San Diego State University from 1968 to 1969 and then left Southern California. During the following four years, he traveled through Europe and North America. He held multiple jobs including assistant manager of a discount department store, gas station attendant, bookstore employee, dishwasher, library assistant, and construction worker. From 1970 to 1971 he was employed by the state psychiatric hospital of New Hampshire as a psychiatric aide for the criminally insane. He returned to Southern California in 1972 and completed an undergraduate degree in English at San Diego State University in 1975. In 1972 he met Laura Lynn Dierker and they were married in 1977. They have three children: Katherine Lynn (born 1981), Ashley Fayette (born 1985), and Lilian M. (born 1987).

From 1979 to 1980, Frame attended the Claremont Graduate School, where he was an assistant in the printmaking department and foreman in the wood shop. He graduated with an MFA. In 1980, John and Laura Frame purchased their first home in Wrightwood, California where Laura had obtained a teaching position in the local elementary school. At the same time John, along with three fellow artists, (Randall Lavender, Eve Steele, and Lynn Roylance) leased a 14,000-square-foot (1,300 m^{2}) building in downtown Los Angeles, known as the Firestone building, and began converting it to artists' studios. Although this project was never completed, it became the first artist-in-residence complex to come under the Los Angeles live/work residency ordinance for artists. Frame’s studio was located there from 1980 until 1991. From 1992 until 2001 the artist's primary studio was located in the Santa Fe art colony in downtown Los Angeles. He also maintained a small working studio at his home in Wrightwood. During the years at the Santa Fe colony, his studio became a focal point for many of the figurative artists working in the Los Angeles area including Jim Doolan, Lauren Richardson, Jon Swihart, Peter Zokosky, Enjeong Noh, Brian Apthorp, F. Scott Hess, Cecilia Miguez, Ken Jones, Wes Christensen, Luis Serrano, Stephen Douglas and Stephen Dean Moore, among many others. The Los Angeles drawing group met in his studio on a weekly basis between 1992 and 2001 to draw from live models. Frame also originated the Los Angeles collaborative group known as the Bastards.This group consisted of Frame, Jon Swihart, Steve Galloway, Michael C. McMillan, F. Scott Hess and Peter Zokosky. The Bastards completed more than 60 collaborative works and had two exhibitions, one at Hunsaker/Schlesinger gallery in Los Angeles and one at the Davidson gallery in Seattle, Washington.

In 2001, Frame closed his studio in the Santa Fe art gallery and moved full-time to Wrightwood, where he continues to live and work.

== Sculpture ==
Frame spent much of the 1970s studying a variety of art forms, including dance, theater, and literature. After college, he began creating his own work, experimenting with drawing, painting, and printmaking before coming to sculpture. (To Hear the Sirens' Song and Live, the earliest work appearing in his 2005 retrospective show, was created in 1980.)

Although Frame received an MFA, he had no formal training in sculpture. His sculptural works were initially roughly-hewn, somewhat coarse studies of the human form. Though the refinement of his technical skill is evident in the stylistic changes in his work over the years, he has remained primarily a figurative sculptor with a humanistic, expressionist bent. His work draws on a tradition of fragmented figuration that dates back to the Renaissance and is visible in works of Rodin, Brancusi, and Giacometti. This focus represents a conscious departure from the abstract and conceptualist art that was popular when he attended graduate school and that has continued to dominate from an academic point of view. Instead, in addition to the Renaissance, Frame's work has drawn from older traditions, including Greek tragedy and medieval art and spiritual practice (altarpieces, reliquary, morality plays, Italian Commedia dell'arte, and hagiography). Critics have noted other diverse echoes and influences in Frame's work, including 19th century allegorical statuary, Black Forest Carvings, aboriginal fetish figures romanesque and gothic effigies, American Arts and Crafts, and cubism His work has been noted to have commonalities with that of Joseph Cornell, H.C. Westermann, Michael McMillen, and Stephen DeStaebler

His sculptural output increased between 1984 and 1990. In the mid-1990s, he began to incorporate found objects into his pieces, a practice he has continued into the present. Thus, he has been said to be a part of the California assemblage tradition. In the late 1990s, Frame's interest in literature began to be reflected directly in his work as he juxtaposed image and text in relief carving. Relief carvings reference, among others, Keats (Here lies one whose name was writ in water) and Blake (Some are born to sweet delight; some are born to endless night). Literary allusions have also appeared frequently in his titles, whose referents include Shakespeare (As water is in water, Poor Tom), the Bible (Noli me Tangere), and Wilfred Owen (All A Poet Can Do Is Warn). In addition to these explicitly referenced sources, Frame cites other artists among his influences, among them writers Emily Dickinson, Leo Tolstoy, Simone Weil, and Fyodor Dostoevsky, and directors Kurosawa, Tarkovsky, and Fellini, and Bergman. (He credits the latter with helping him realize that he was to be an artist.) He has also been deeply influenced by classical music.

Frame's sculpture has been described as tragic, theatrical, enigmatic, fragmented, and formally inventive. Critics generally note that his work is concerned, in subject and content, with “the deepest dilemmas of life”. Combining “humanistic concerns with irony, intellect, and psychological insight” they deal with the human condition, spirituality, and nature, with transformation and sacrifice. His work has been criticized for its approach to gender (his figures are generally perceived as male, though the artist has said that he perceives them as “genderless”) and sexuality. In particular, his 1995 piece Strapping Boy has proved disturbing for many who feel that its implied narrative is one of sexual abuse. Critic Gerald Ackerman has interpreted the piece thus: “[it] gives us an unwelcome and unsettling realization of the ambiguity of both sexuality and affection, and of the troubles their impulsive interweaving can engender”. These criticisms aside, those who review Frame's work frequently cite that its appeal lies in his propensity to probe the deep questions of life without arriving at easy answers. One critic captures this tension thus: “[In Frame's work] the meaning eludes us while the search for meaning captivates us.”

== The Tale of the Crippled Boy: Three Fragments of a Lost Tale ==
O-man from "The Tale of the Crippled Boy," 2011

In 2005, Frame began to take his work in a new direction. That year, he conceived and began to execute the work that would form his largest exhibition to date. (The work, entitled The Tale of the Crippled Boy: Three Fragments of a Lost Tale was exhibited at the Huntington Library, Art Collections, and Botanical Gardens from March–June 2011.) The installation is unique in the artist's career in that it includes not only thirty-five pieces of sculpture but also sets, photography and animated vignettes, all based around an eclectic cast of sculpted characters, most of whom are fully articulated, with moving fingers, bodies, and jaws. The exhibition also includes an 8-minute documentary on the artist's process, directed by filmmaker Johnny Coffeen. This departure from Frame's past work was not totally unanticipated; David Pagel, in a review of the artist's 2005 retrospective, noted “If John Frame were in the movie business, he would be a costume designer, stylist, set decorator, prop master, lighting specialist, writer, director, editor, producer, agent and publicist all rolled into one do it yourself lover of every little detail of every little job.” And, in fact, Frame has completed this project (including music, lighting, and photography) with only the help of a few friends and family members.

The work also shares thematic consistency with the artist's previous work, according to curators Kevin Murphy and Jessica Todd Smith, who state, “In keeping with the work John Frame has created throughout his career, the tale and the art associated with it evoke universal human themes—the nature of good and evil, the inevitability of death, and the struggle to find meaning in life—but always in a connotative rather than denotative manner.”

The artist anticipates continuing the project, eventually producing a full-length film.

== Production Design ==
In 2018, Frame served as the Production Designer for the Chicago Lyric Opera production of Faust, which ran from March 3 - March 31. The production was in tandem with the Portland Opera where Faust opened on June 8, 2018.

== Solo exhibitions ==
- 2012 Portland Art Museum, Stott Gallery, Portland, Oregon
- 2011 The Huntington Library, Art Collections and Botanical Gardens, San Marino, California
- 2005 Long Beach Museum of Art, Long Beach, California
- 1999 Kohn/Turner Gallery, Los Angeles, California
- 1996 Kohn/Turner Gallery, Los Angeles, California
- 1993 Jan Turner Gallery, Los Angeles, California
- 1992 Los Angeles County Museum of Art, Los Angeles, California
- 1990 Jan Turner Gallery, Los Angeles, California
- 1987 Jan Turner Gallery, Los Angeles, California
- 1984 Janus Gallery, Los Angeles, California
- 1983 Installation Gallery, San Diego, California
- 1982 Janus Gallery, Los Angeles, California
- Mattingly Baker Gallery, Dallas, Texas
- 1981 Francine Seders Gallery, Seattle, Washington

== Group exhibitions, awards, and honors ==
John Frame has received grants and awards from the National Endowment for the Arts (Visual Fellowship Grant, 1984, 1986), the Los Angeles County Museum of Art (New Talent Award, 1985), and the J. Paul Getty Museum (Individual Artists Fellowship, 1995). In 2009, he received an Honorary Doctor of Arts degree from Cornish College of the Arts in Seattle, Washington.

Frame has participated in at least 62 group exhibitions. A partial list appears below:

- 2001, “Representing L.A.,” Frye Art Museum, Seattle, WA
- 1997, “Bastards: Individual and Collaborative Works, “Hunsaker/Schlesinger, Santa Monica, CA
- 1997, “Blessings and Beginnings,” Skirball Museum, Los Angeles, CA
- 1995, “Burning Lights: Spirituality, Tradition, and Craft in Recent Art From the City of Angels,” Palm Springs Desert Museum, Palm Springs, CA, Catalog, Illus.
- 1994, “beyond appearance,” The Armory Center for the Arts, Pasadena, CA, and California College of Arts and crafts, Oakland, CA, Catalog, Illus
- 1994, “The Fifth International Shoe Box Sculpture Exhibition,” Taiwan Museum of Art, Taichung, Taiwan, Catalog, Illus.
- 1991, “Individual Realities in the California ArtScene,” Sezon Museum of Art, Tokyo Japan. Seibu Tsukashin Hall, Amagasaki, Japan, Catalog, Illus.
- 1991, “Drawings,” Koplin Gallery, Los Angeles, CA
- 1990, “Fourth International Shoe Box Sculpture Exhibition,” University of Hawaii, Honolulu, HI, Catalog, Illus.
- 1989, “Art From Los Angeles,” Nakazawa Gallery, Tokyo, Japan.
- 1987, “Avant-garde in the Eighties,” Los Angeles County Museum of Art, Los Angeles, CA, Catalog, Illus.
- 1985, “Spektrum Los Angeles,” Galerie Hartje, Berlin, Germany. Catalog, Illus.
- 1984, “Return of the Narrative,” Palm Springs Desert Museum, Palm Springs, CA, Catalog, Illus.
- 1984, “Three Sculptors: John Frame, Sam Hernandez, Gary Martin,” ARCO Center for Visual Art, Los Angeles, CA, Catalog, Illus.
- 1981, “Newcomers 1981,” Los Angeles Municipal Art Gallery, Los Angeles, CA

Frame’s work can also be found in more than three hundred public and private collections, including those of the Los Angeles County Museum of Art, the University of Southern California, and The Renwick Gallery of American Art at the Smithsonian Institution. Frame has been artist-in-residence, visiting artist or guest lecturer at more than fifty museums, universities and art-related institutions around the United States. He has also taught at the University of California at Los Angeles, the Art Center College of Design in Pasadena, and the Claremont Graduate School.
