= Dubomedy =

Dubomedy Arts is an arts school in the MENA region offering professional training in acting, Arabic comedy, basic circus skills, body beats, character development, Emirati language, improvisation, NYC tap dance, performance, sketch comedy, stand-up comedy, and writing. It was founded on April 1, 2008, by comedian Mina Liccione and stand-up comedian and producer Ali Al Sayed.

== Ali Al Sayed ==
Co-founder Ali Al Sayed is a comedian in the MENA region and serves as Dubai's first local professional comedian. He has been recognized as "one of the most influential comedians in the world" by Toastmasters International Magazine and earned the nickname the “King of Laughter” from Rolling Stone ME. Al Sayed is the founder of local entertainment company Viva Arts, is the co-director of Dubomedy Arts, and the producer of the Dubai International Comedy Carnival in the MENA region.

== Mina Liccione ==
Co-founder Mina Liccione is an arts educator, choreographer, comedian, performing artist, and tap dancer.

== DIPAF ==
In 2010, Dubomedy launched the first international performing arts festival in the UAE titled the Dubomedy International Performing Arts Festival (DIPAF).
