= F. Scott Hess =

American painter

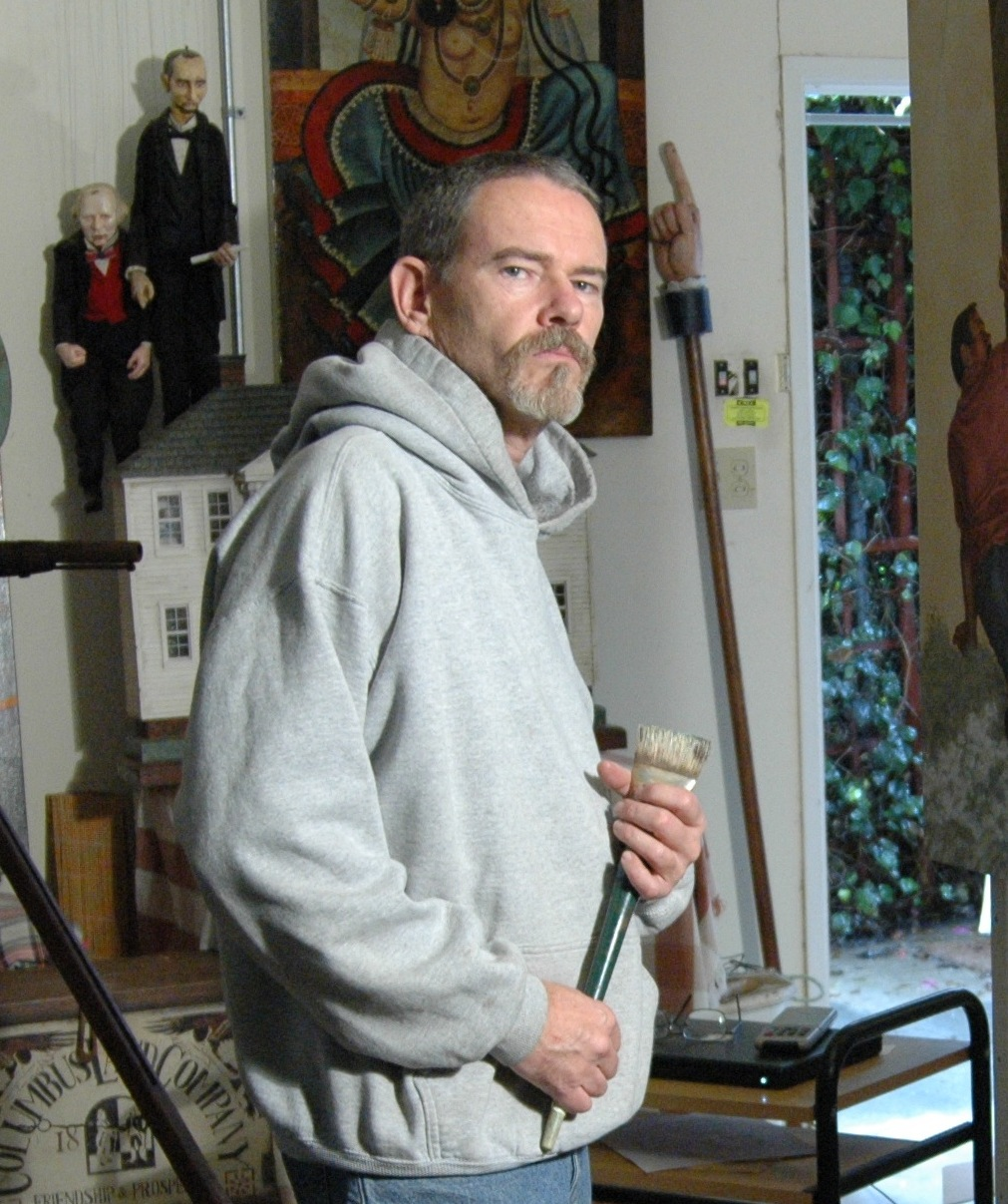
- F. Scott Hess in his Los Angeles studio in October 2010
- Born: July 12, 1955; Baltimore, Maryland
- Education: University of Wisconsin–Madison, Academy of Fine Arts Vienna
- Known for: Realist figure painting

F. Scott Hess (born July 12, 1955) is an American painter and conceptual artist. He has described himself as a "reluctant realist" whose work is nevertheless grounded in Old Master craft and the representation of observed detail. Art critic Donald Kuspit suggests, "Hess uses profane realism to represent the sacred moments of life, for he knows we live in a profane world with little or no sense of the sacred, let alone of the sacredness of art".

== Early life and education ==
F. Scott Hess was born in Baltimore, Maryland, in 1955, but grew up in Florida and Wisconsin. Hess' parents divorced when he was seven years old, and he reacted by making drawings of bound nude women - with Hess saying he didn't realize until much later that he was magically binding 'the woman,' his mother, so that she would not leave as his father had. Hess focused on printmaking and drawing at the University of Wisconsin–Madison, where he graduated with a Bachelor of Science in Art in 1977. Feeling a kinship with the psychological depth and technical skills exhibited by middle-European artists, Hess moved to Austria in 1978, and attended the Academy of Fine Arts Vienna as a student in the Meisterschule of Rudolf Hausner.

== Career ==
F. Scott Hess's first solo exhibition was at Galerie Herzog in Vienna, Austria in 1979, followed shortly thereafter by group exhibitions in Germany, France, and a second solo exhibition in Vienna's Tabak Museum in 1982. While in Vienna Hess was awarded Austria's prestigious Theodor Körner Prize in 1981. In 1984 he moved to Los Angeles. Hess received a Western States Art Federation Award in 1990 as well as a J. Paul Getty Museum Fellowship and a National Endowment for the Arts Visual Arts Fellowship in 1991. Some of Hess's works have been purchased by Los Angeles County Museum of Art, San Jose Museum of Art, Orange County Museum of Art, Pasadena Museum of California Art, Oakland Museum of California, the Smithsonian Institution, Long Beach Museum of Art, and the Bahman Cultural House, Tehran, Iran, among others as part of their permanent collections. In 2014 Hess had a comprehensive retrospective curated by Mike McGee and split between the Begovich Gallery at California State University-Fullerton, and the Los Angeles Municipal Art Gallery. A full monograph encompassing the works in the retrospective, and entitled 'F. Scott Hess' was published in 2014 by Grand Central Press and Gingko Press, with essays by Mike McGee, Doug Harvey, Leah Ollman, and John Seed. Hess was represented by Ovsey Gallery in Los Angeles (1985-1994), Hackett-Freedman Gallery in San Francisco (1998-2009), Hirschl & Adler Modern in New York (2010-2013), and has been represented by Koplin Del Rio Gallery in Culver City since 2010. Hess is currently an Associate Professor with the Laguna College of Art and Design's BFA and MFA programs.

== The Bastards ==
The Bastards were a collaborative artists' group including F Scott Hess, John Frame, Steve Galloway, Peter Zokosky, Michael C. McMillen, and Jon Swihart. Swihart remembers the origins of The Bastards:

"The Bastards grew out of this drawing group we have where we get together and draw from the model. We'd hang out afterwards and drink beer and talk. Naturally, we started collaborating on pieces, at first just joking around, but as they became pretty good, we decided to formalize The Bastards. The name refers to the pieces not having any clear parentage. That's also how a lot of people probably consider us".

The Bastards exhibited at Hunsaker/Schlesinger, Santa Monica, CA, in 1997, and Davidson Galleries, Seattle, WA, in 1999.

== The Hours of the Day ==
F. Scott Hess worked on The Hours of the Day for six years, from 1994 to 2000, styling it roughly on the medieval Book of Hours, and injecting content from art history, the Bible, and daily family interactions into twenty-four paintings, one for each hour in Hess' mythical day.

F. Scott Hess describes his stunning cycle of paintings on view at the Orange County Museum of Art as "prayers for atheists." They are religious paintings, he says, "bereft of God but searching for the core of what it means to be human.

— Art writer Leah Ollman, Los Angeles Times

The Hours of the Day series was exhibited at the Orange County Museum of Art, Newport Beach, California, in October 2001.

== The Paternal Suit: Heirlooms from the F. Scott Hess Family Foundation ==
The objects in The Paternal Suit tell the true story of Hess' ancestry in America as seen through the eyes of four centuries of artists and craftsmen, all of whom may or may not have existed. The collection holds more than one hundred objects, including paintings, old photographs, ceramics, historical documents, weapons, sculpture, and antique artifacts, all appearing as authentic items from their specified time period. Hess lays no claim to the creation of the artifacts in The Paternal Suit, but acts instead as the collecting Director of his own Family Foundation, dedicated to assembling a visual historical narrative of Hess' paternal line that includes United States Senator Alfred Iverson Sr., and his son, Brigadier General Alfred Iverson Jr., C.S.A. According to The New York Times, "Mr. Hess came up with his own absurdist art — for example, an oversize Confederate uniform that he said had expanded after exposure to manure fumes — to combine with real evidence of events that include his ancestors' doomed attempts to market newly patented ice makers and chalkboards. "The facts are as dumb as stuff I made up," he said". The Paternal Suit opened at the Halsey Institute of Contemporary Art, Charleston, SC (2012), traveled to the Mobile Museum of Art, Mobile AL (2013), Sumter Gallery of Art, Sumter, SC (2014) and the Long Beach Museum of Art, Long Beach, CA (2014).
