= Circus Center =

Circus school in San Francisco, California

- Founders: Wendy Parkman; Judy Finelli
- Established: 1984; 41 years ago
- Address: 755 Frederick Street, San Francisco, California, United States
- Location: San Francisco, California, U.S.
- Coordinates: 37°45′57″N 122°27′25″W
- Website: circuscenter.org

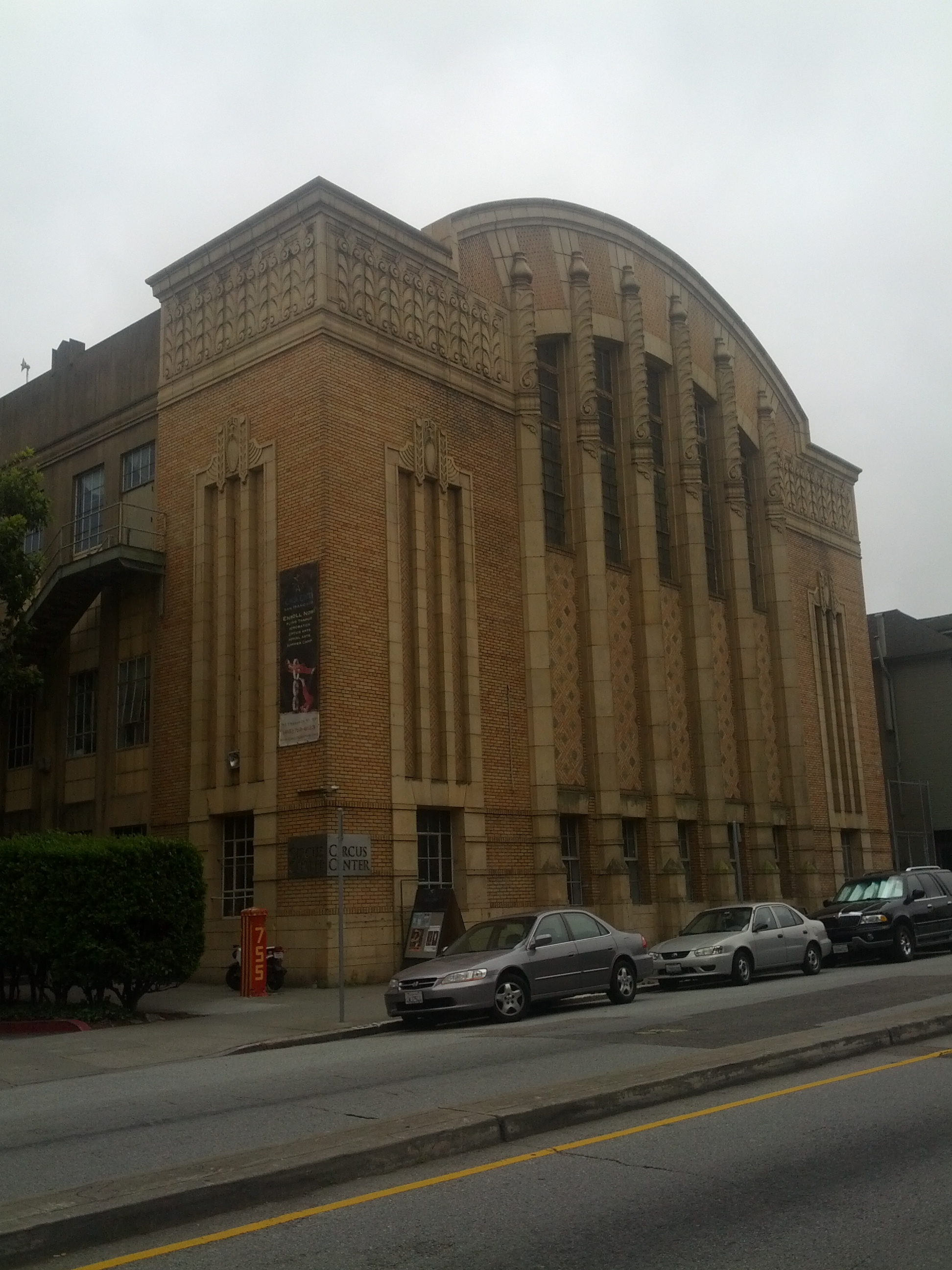
Circus Center in San Francisco

Circus Center is a circus school in San Francisco, California. It was founded in 1984 by Wendy Parkman and Judy Finelli as the San Francisco School of Circus Arts.

== History ==
In 1974 the Pickle Family Circus was founded by Peggy Snider and Larry Pisoni. Ten years later, the San Francisco School of Circus Arts was founded by Wendy Parkman and Judy Finelli as a project of the Pickle Family Circus. The school was then located at the Pickle headquarters in an old church on San Francisco's Potrero Hill. Two years later, Hannah Kahn assumed control of the school, directing it over the next 10 years. In 1990, master instructor Lu Yi was hired with the mandate of developing the most comprehensive Chinese acrobatics program outside of China. Three years later, the school was incorporated as a separate nonprofit organization, and moved into a vacant Polytech high school gymnasium in the Haight-Ashbury district. In 1996, the San Francisco Circus was established, and later that year the school staged its first student production, Zoppo!, a show that played to a sold-out house at the Cowell Theater at Fort Mason.

Four years passed before the San Francisco School of Circus Arts purchased the New Pickle Circus from the Santa Cruz-based nonprofit organization that had produced the company's shows since 1993. All of the purchase price was raised from contributed sources, and staged professional productions under the banner of the New Pickle Circus. The Clown Conservatory program was then started with a grant from the National Endowment for the Arts as the only year-long professional circus clown training program in the United States. In 2001, the board of directors changed the corporation's name to Circus Center, reflecting the fact that the organization now encompassed more than a school.

== Major programs ==
The school currently offers classes and private instruction in numerous circus skills, including Chinese acrobatics, contortion, Chinese pole, juggling, teeterboard, trampoline, static trapeze, flying trapeze, aerial hoop, aerial silk and aerial straps. It also offers various workshops.
