= University of the Arts (Philadelphia) =

Art school in Philadelphia, Pennsylvania, US

Coordinates: 39°56′46″N 75°09′57″W

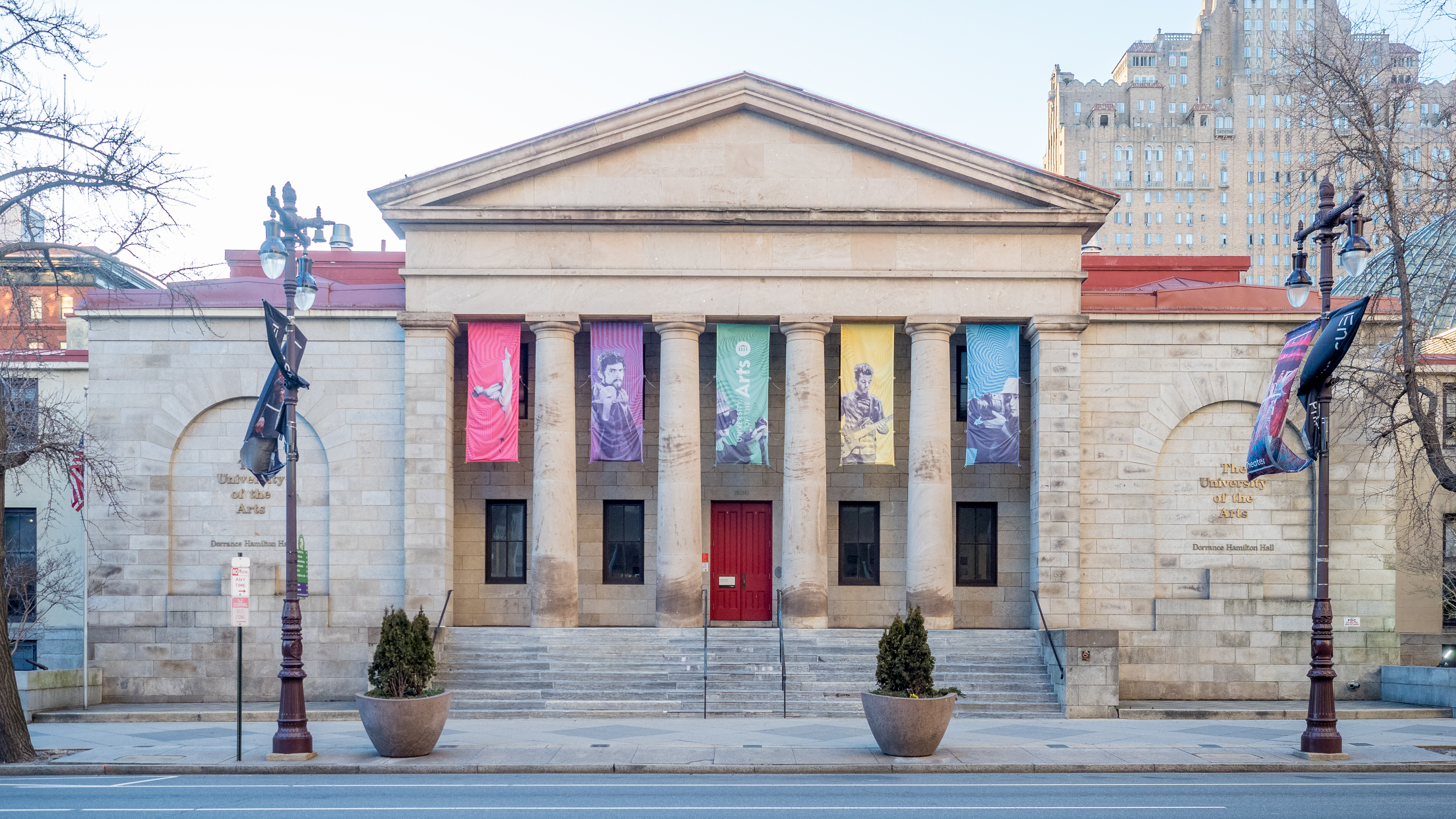
- Dorrance Hamilton Hall in 2024
- Type: Private art university
- Active: 1870–2024
- Location: Philadelphia, Pennsylvania, United States
- Campus: Urban
- Colors: Red; White
- Mascot: Unicorn
- Website: uarts.edu

The University of the Arts (UArts) was a private arts university in Philadelphia, Pennsylvania. Its campus made up part of the Avenue of the Arts cultural district in Center City, Philadelphia. On May 31, 2024, university administrators suddenly announced that the university would close on June 7, 2024, although its precarious financial situation had been known for some time. It was accredited by the Middle States Commission on Higher Education.

The university included six schools: the School of Art, School of Dance, School of Design, School of Film, School of Music (accredited by the National Association of Schools of Music), and the Ira Brind School of Theater Arts, along with graduate and professional programs. A Saturday School of art classes for children opened in 1900.

== History ==
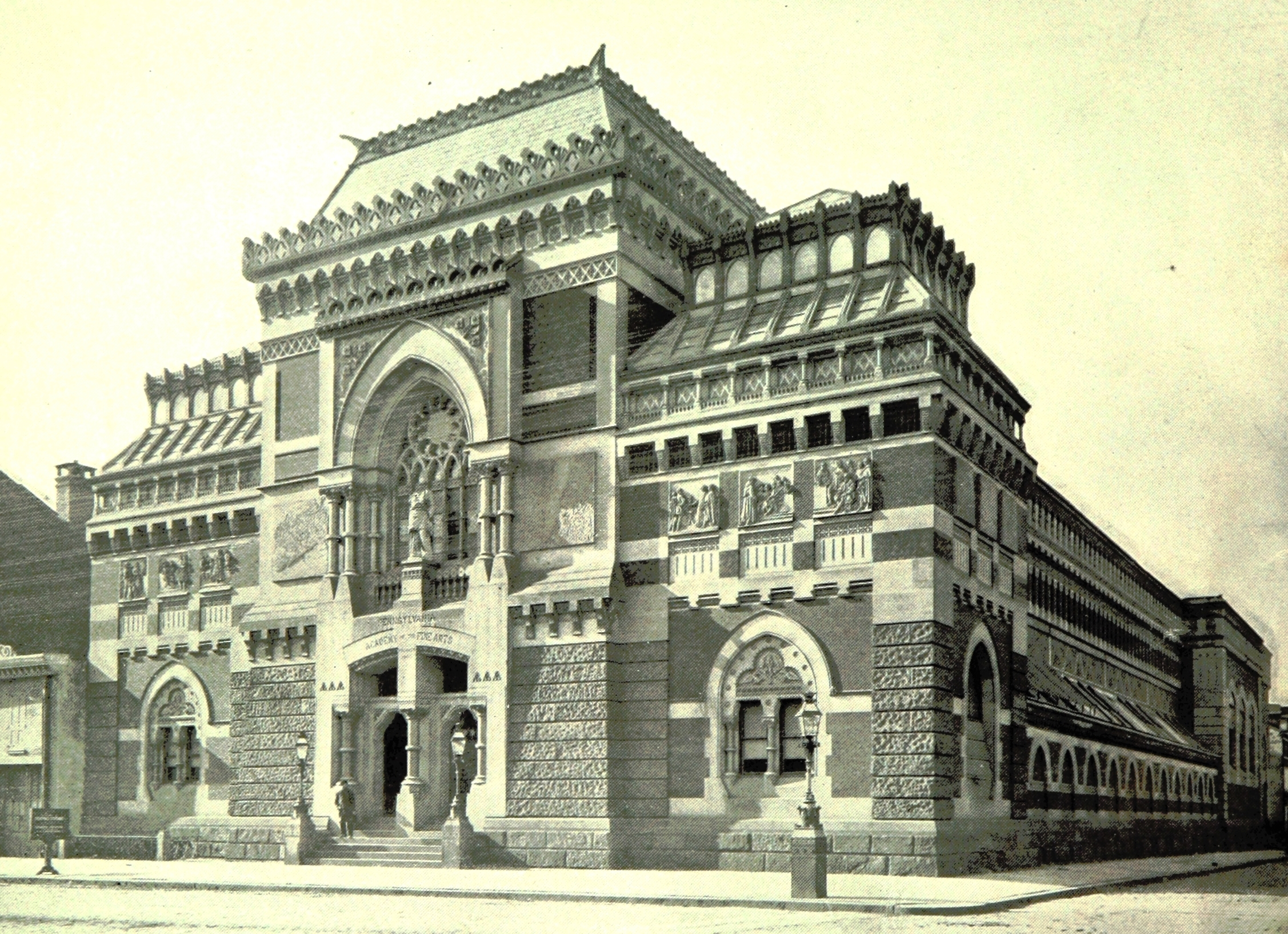
Pennsylvania Academy of the Fine Arts (c. 1895)

In 1870, the Philadelphia Musical Academy (PMA) was created by Johann F. Himmelsbach, Rudolph Hennig, and Wenzel Kopta. Ownership of PMA went to Richard Zeckwer in 1876. In 1876, the Pennsylvania Museum and School of Industrial Art was founded as a museum, which became the Philadelphia Museum of Art, and an art school, which went through various name changes and mergers before becoming the University of the Arts. Though never housed in the same building, the museum and the school were one institution. In 1877, the Philadelphia Conservatory of Music was founded. In 1900 a Saturday School for children was added to the Pennsylvania Museum School of Industrial Art.

In 1893, the Pennsylvania Museum School of Industrial Art purchased an early 19th-century neoclassical building at 320 South Broad Street, which had been designed in 1824 by John Haviland for the Pennsylvania School for the Deaf.

In 1917 violinist and composer Frederick E. Hahn's Hahn Conservatory of Music (founded 1902) merged into the PMA at which time Hahn was appointed both president and director of the school. Hahn remained director of the PMA until his death in 1942.

In 1921, contralto Marian Anderson applied to the Philadelphia Musical Academy but was turned away because she was "colored." In 1890 Mrs. Ida May Yeocum had also been turned away due to her race.

In 1938, the museum changed its name to the Philadelphia Museum of Art and the school became the Philadelphia Museum School of Industrial Art. In 1964, the school became independent of the museum and renamed itself the Philadelphia College of Art (PCA).

In 1944, the Children's Dance Theatre, later known as the Philadelphia Dance Academy, was established by Nadia Chilkovsky Nahumck. In 1962, the Philadelphia Conservatory of Music and the Philadelphia Musical Academy merged; in 1976, the combined organization acquired the Dance Academy and renamed itself the Philadelphia College of the Performing Arts. After establishing a School of Theater in 1983, the institution became the first performing arts college in Pennsylvania to offer a comprehensive range of majors in music, dance and theater. This institution later became the College of Performing Arts of the University of the Arts.

In 1985, the Philadelphia College of Art and the Philadelphia College of the Performing Arts merged to become the Philadelphia Colleges of the Arts, and gained university status as the University of the Arts in 1987.

In 1996, the university added a third academic division, the College of Media and Communication. In 2011, the College of Media and Communication merged with the College of Art and Design to become the College of Art, Media & Design. Then, there were just two colleges and two divisions: the College of Art, Media & Design; the College of Performing Arts; the Division of Liberal Arts; and the Division of Continuing Studies. The College of Art, Media and Design was accredited at the time by the National Association of Schools of Art and Design.

The Philadelphia Art Alliance became a part of the university in 2017.

=== Financial and enrollment challenges ===
In the late 2010s and 2020s, the university faced declining enrollment and a poor financial outlook. In the 2018–19 school year enrollment was at 1,914 falling to 1,149 by the start of the fall 2023 semester. The university was profitable for the 2021–22 fiscal year, but the next year it had a projected operating loss of $2.56 million, on a budget of about $50 million.

From 2018 to 2022, the university led a capital campaign that allegedly raised $67.2 million, including $5.5 million for financial aid and $24 million for its endowment, which grew to $61.2 million. The school also received a $2.5 million grant from Pennsylvania for infrastructure projects. The exact amount received from those gift pledges is unknown. The endowment money was not usable for day-to-day operations, which remained imperiled. Starting in 2019, the day-to-day university fund ended each academic year with only a single month of funding remaining. In 2023, the president behind the capital campaign, David Yager, retired. He was replaced by Kerry Walk.

In October 2023, Walk privately announced to the deans of the university that "she’d recently discovered serious financial problems that she’d been unaware of when she accepted the job". This was not communicated to students, faculty or alumni, and is the only known discussion of serious issues before the following May.

=== Closure ===
On May 29, 2024, the university informed the Middle States Commission on Higher Education that it would imminently close, and announced publicly on May 31, 2024 that it would close exactly one week later on June 7. President Walk stated that the school had exhausted all of its funds. The announcement caught many by surprise. Also on May 31, 2024 the accreditor noted that "the institution failed to inform the Commission of closure in a timely manner or to properly plan for closure with prior approval" and withdrew the university's accreditation as of the following day, June 1. On June 4, 2024, Walk announced her resignation after an information meeting for faculty and students was canceled. On June 5, 2024, the board of trustees hired the consulting firm Alvarez and Marsal to oversee the closure. The accreditor rendered their withdrawal of accreditation unappealable as of June 10, apart from a "limited extension of the accreditation cease date to July 19, 2024, for the sole purpose of awarding earned academic credentials, executing any appropriate course substitutions, and for processing course grades."

On September 13, 2024, the university filed for Chapter 7 bankruptcy liquidation.

The Historical Society of Pennsylvania is now the home for a collection of archive materials from the UArts Libraries as well as a limited collection of student archives of the Pennsylvania Museum and School of Industrial Art / Philadelphia Museum School of Industrial Art. The UArts library collection is now owned by the Forman Arts Initiative.

=== Sale and redevelopment ===
The university's premises were sold in late 2024 and early 2025 as part of its bankruptcy proceedings. On February 24, 2025, Hamilton and Furness Halls became the fourth and fifth of nine buildings to be sold during the university's bankruptcy process. Scout Ltd., the development company known for transforming the Edward W. Bok Technical High School, purchased the buildings for $12.25 million at an auction with plans to turn them into artist workshops and subsidized housing for artists. Sales were completed for three other buildings: Art Alliance, which was purchased by Curtis Institute of Music; Terra Hall, which went to Temple University; and the Arts Bank building, sold to Quadro Bay LLC. By July 7, 2025, Gershman Hall at Broad and Pine, originally the Young Men's and Women's Hebrew Association building, was sold to Lubert-Adler realty, completing liquidation of the university's premises.

== Academics ==
The University of the Arts' approximately 1,500 students were enrolled in undergraduate and graduate programs in six schools: Art, Design, Film, Dance, Music, and the Ira Brind School of Theater Arts. In addition, the university offered a PhD in Creativity. The Division of Continuing Studies offers courses through its Continuing Education, Pre-College, Summer Music Studies, and Professional Institute for Educators programs. The university was accredited by the Middle States Commission on Higher Education.

== Facilities and collections ==
The university's campus, in the Avenue of the Arts cultural district of Center City Philadelphia, included six academic buildings and four residence halls. There were 10 performance venues and 12 exhibition/gallery spaces on campus.

The Albert M. Greenfield Library housed 152,067 bound volumes, 6,936 CDs, 14,901 periodicals, 16,820 scores and 1965 videos and DVDs. The Music Library collection held about 20,000 scores, 15,000 books, 10,000 LP discs, and 8,000 CDs. The Visual Resources Collection includes 175,000 slides. Additional university collections included the University Archives, the Picture File, the Book Arts and Textile Collections, and the Drawing Resource Center. Following the closure of the school the library collection was purchased by the Forman Arts Initiative, and the archives went to the Historical Society of Pennsylvania.

UArts' 10 galleries included one curated by students. Exhibitions have included the Quay Brothers, Vito Acconci, R. Crumb, Rosalyn Drexler, April Gornik, Alex Grey, James Hyde, Jon Kessler, Donald Lipski, Robert Motherwell, Stuart Netsky, Irving Penn, Jack Pierson, Anne and Patrick Poirier, Yvonne Rainer, Lenore Tawney and Andy Warhol.

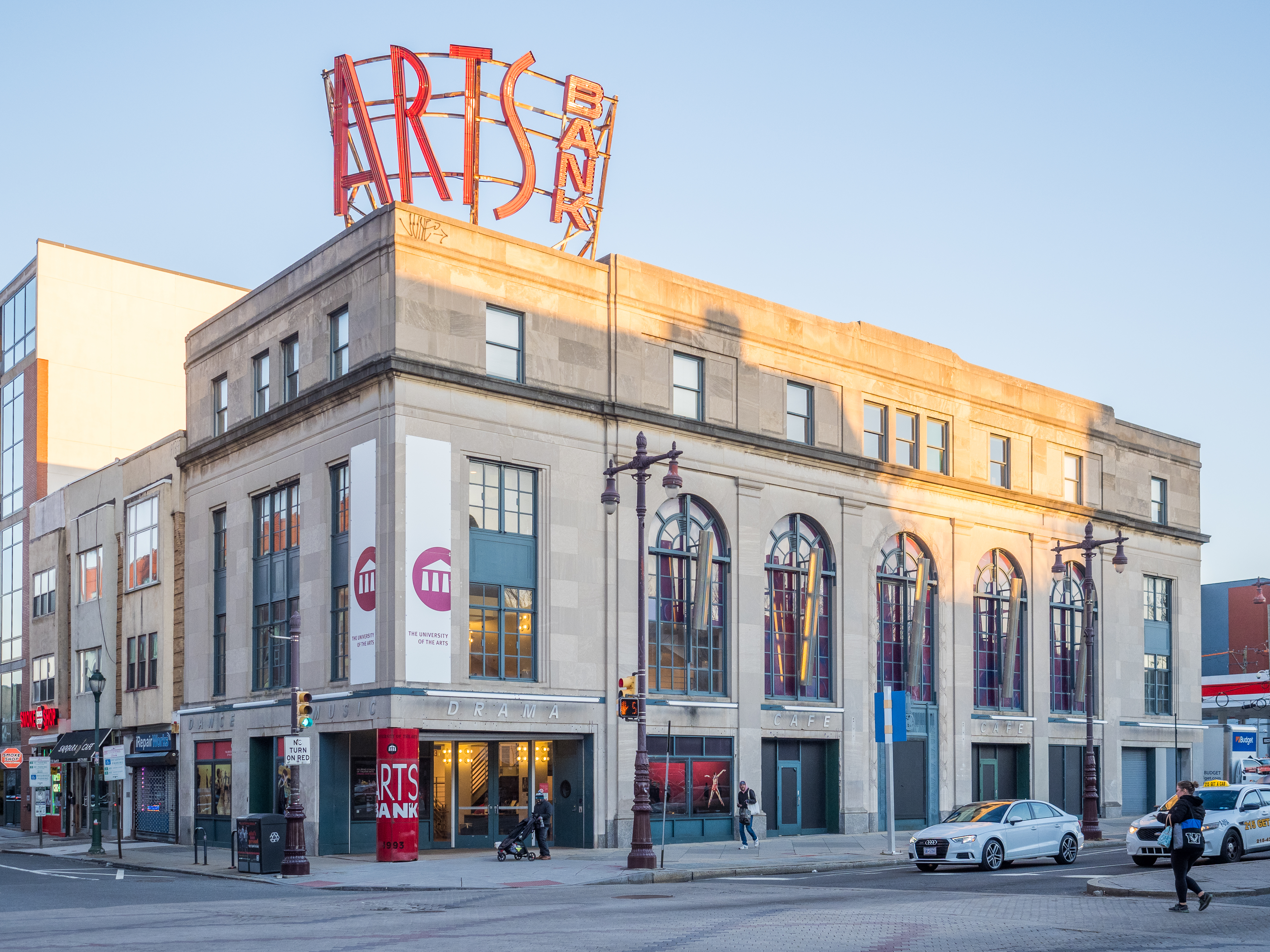
Arts Bank Theater

The University of the Arts had seven theaters. The Levitt Auditorium in Gershman Hall was the largest on campus with a seating capacity of 850. Also in Gershman Hall was a small black box theater used for student-run productions. The university's Arts Bank Theater seated 230, and the Laurie Beechman Cabaret Theater was located in the same building. At one time, the university also utilized the nearby Drake Theater primarily for dance productions. The Caplan Center for the Performing Arts, located on the 16 & 17th floor of Terra Hall – which opened in 2007, housed two theaters. Its black box theater seated 100 and a recital hall seated 250.

At the time of closing, it had three dormitories for students: Furness Residence Hall, Juniper Residence Hall, and Spruce Residence Hall. In 2023 the university sold another, Pine Residence Hall.

== Polyphone Festival ==
The annual Polyphone Festival of New and Emerging Music, launched in 2016, focused on the emerging musical. Composers, librettists, directors, choreographers and music directors were invited to the campus to work with students on developing musicals.

== See also ==
- Arts education
- San Francisco Art Institute
