= Ali Al Sayed =

Comedian

Ali Al Sayed is a comedian based in Dubai. He is the founder of the entertainment company Viva Arts and co-director of Dubomedy Arts, a comedy and urban arts training program based in the UAE.

== Performances and productions ==
Al Sayed has performed in various live comedy events across the Middle East and internationally. He co-founded Monday Night Funnies, a regular comedy and variety night in the UAE. He has appeared in regional comedy tours, including Stand Up Expat and Boys Night Out, and has performed at events such as the 2010 EFFIE MENA Awards and Ahlan's 'Best in Dubai' Awards.

He has participated in the Edinburgh Fringe Festive, performing in the show Big In Dubai!, recognized as one of the first UAE-produced comedy show to be a part of the festival. He has also performed at the New York Arab-American Comedy Festival and the Muslim Funny Fest in New York City.

In addition to his stand-up work, Al Sayed co-produced the DUBOMEDY International Performing Arts Festival (DIPAF) in 2010 and 2011 and has been involved in producing other comedy-related projects in the region, including Funny Girls, a stand-up comedy troupe featuring female performers.

== Coaching and instruction ==
Al Sayed has worked as a comedy coach and instructor, conducting workshops in the region and abroad. He has served as an acting coach for independent film productions, including the Emirati-Indian short film Mallal, which won an award at the Dubai International Film Festival. He has also been an instructor at the Theater of Changes festival in Greece.

== Media and television ==
Al Sayed has appeared on television in the UAE and wider Arab region, with segments on Abu Dhabi TV, MBC, Dubai One and OSN. He currently contributes as a comedy writer and commentator on Abu Dhabi Sports TV’s program The Beautiful Game. He has also appeared on the Stand-Up Sketch Show on Shahid and on Comedy Central Arabia.
