= Otis College of Art and Design =

Art school in Los Angeles, California

Coordinates: 33.956611°N 118.417135°W

- Former names: Otis Art Institute (1918–1977), Otis Art Institute of Parsons School of Design (1978–1991)
- Type: Private art and design school
- Established: 1918
- Accreditation: WSCUC
- President: Charles Hirschhorn
- Undergraduates: 1,093
- Postgraduates: 60 (MFA)
- Location: Westchester, Los Angeles, California, United States
- Campus: Urban
- Nickname: Owls
- Mascot: Owlbert
- Website: www.otis.edu

Otis College of Art and Design is a private art and design school in Los Angeles, California, United States. Established in 1918, it was the city's first independent professional school of art. The main campus is located in the former IBM Aerospace headquarters at 9045 Lincoln Boulevard in Westchester, Los Angeles. The school's programs, accredited by the WSCUC and National Association of Schools of Art and Design, include BFA and MFA degrees.

== History ==
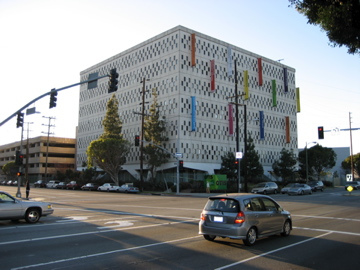
The Ahmanson building at Otis College of Art and Design

Otis, long considered one of the major art institutions in California, began in 1918, when Los Angeles Times founder Harrison Gray Otis bequeathed his Westlake, Los Angeles, property to start the first public, independent professional school of art in Southern California. However, Otis would not live to see the college's grand opening as he died the previous year in 1917. The current Otis College main campus (since spring 1997) is located in the Westchester area of Los Angeles, close to the Los Angeles International Airport. The main building (built in 1963) was designed by architect Eliot Noyes for IBM, and is famous for its computer "punched card" style windows.

The building was extensively remodeled in 1997 by the college when it moved from its original location across the street from MacArthur Park near downtown Los Angeles. The Galef Center, made for the Fine Arts department, was designed by Fredrick Fisher and built in 2001.

A ceramics school was begun by Peter Voulkos at Otis in the 1950s and was part of art movements like the Craft-to-Art movement, also known as the American Clay Revolution, which influenced the Ferus Gallery scene of the 1960s. Many prominent artists associated with Southern California's Light and Space movement were involved with the school, as well as leaders of the conceptual art world of the 1970s. Moreover, Otis nurtured significant Latino artists, including Marisol Escobar, and the mural group Los Four also originated at Otis in the 1970s.

The school was originally named Otis Art Institute. From 1978 until 1991, it was affiliated with New York's Parsons School of Design and known as Otis–Parsons (full name: Otis Art Institute of Parsons School of Design, a division of the New School for Social Research). This affiliation allowed students to spend a semester or more at the Parsons schools in New York and Paris. In summer 1991, it became independent again and known as Otis College of Art and Design.

As of 2005, it is one of the most culturally diverse private schools of art and design in the country. In 2022, the college received the largest donation in its history from the Spiegel Family Fund, which was founded by CEO of Snapchat (Snap Inc.), Evan Spiegel. The donation paid off the debt of the graduating class, 77% of whom identify as people of color.

The president of Otis College is Charles Hirschhorn, since June 2020.

== Rankings and programs ==
Otis is known for its digital media programs. In 2024, Animation Career Review ranked its animation program #22 in the United States, and in 2023, #8 in California. In 2023, it also ranked Otis as #13 for visual effects programs in the United States, and #10 in California for Game Design.

Otis is also known for its fine arts programs. In 2023, Animation Career Review ranked its graphic design program as #21 in the United States, and #4 in California. In 2024, Animation Career Review also ranked its Illustration program as #15 in the United States, and #3 in California.

Finally, it is known for its fashion design program. Under the direction of Rosemary Brantley, this program is considered one of the top fashion design programs of its kind in the U.S. Otis Fashion Design is housed at the California Market Center in downtown Los Angeles. Students benefit from working closely with design mentors and are trained in all aspects of the design process while emulating a fashion design studio, and following the industry's seasonal schedule. Visiting critics have included designers such as Bob Mackie, Francisco Costa for Calvin Klein, Vera Wang, Diane von Fürstenberg, Isabel Toledo, Isaac Mizrahi, and Todd Oldham. Major designers such as Eduardo Lucero and Rick Owens are alumni of the program.

== Artists-in-Residence ==
- 1940s: Norman Rockwell
- 2005: Shahzia Sikander
- 2006: Masami Teraoka
- 2007: Nancy Chunn
- 2008: Mark Dean Veca

== Ben Maltz Gallery ==
Originally located in MacArthur Park, the Ben Maltz Gallery is currently located in Westchester, tucked inside the Otis College of Art in Design. The Ben Maltz Gallery showcases regional and international artists within the LA art community.

== In popular culture ==
The film Art School Confidential (2006) was partially filmed at Otis. Otis Foundation Professor Gary Geraths worked as a consultant on the film.
