= Clown Conservatory =

Clownery and comedy institution, San Francisco

Coordinates: 37°45′57″N 122°27′25″W

The Clown Conservatory is a performing arts school in San Francisco, CA. The school began in 2000 with a grant from the National Endowment for the Arts.

== Curriculum ==
Jeff Raz founded and served as director of the Clown Conservatory from 2000 to 2010. From 2012 to 2015 Joe Dieffenbacher took over as Director assisted by Dan Griffiths. The training format offered 5-7 week Intensives in Clown, Slapstick, Commedia dell'arte and Bouffon, as well as 2 week long summer workshops. This format was established in order to make training more affordable and more accessible to working artists. The focus was on developing professional level performance material for cabaret, theatrical clowning, street theater and circus. It draws inspiration from traditional circus clowning, European street theater and variety. Currently Sara Moore has taken on the role of Director offering a 24-week training program.

== Advanced Program Ensemble ==
In 2008–9, the Clown Conservatory's Advanced Program Ensemble spent a year developing and performing a circus adaptation of Lewis Carroll's Alice in Wonderland under the direction of Jeff Raz. The production, titled Wonderland, was developed around the performing skills of an ensemble of nine Conservatory students selected by audition. The show opened on April 18, 2009, at the Julia Morgan Center in Berkeley, California and was shown locally in a tour of San Francisco Bay area community centers. Spectacle magazine wrote: "This highly inventive circus theatre project and its cast of promising new artists are off to an auspicious beginning... Both the Conservatory's 2009 class of clowns and the play Wonderland deserve to be seen more widely."

== Circus Center ==
Clown Conservatory existed as part of the Circus Center in San Francisco.

A not-for-profit circus organization, Circus Center was created in July 2001, after the San Francisco School of Circus Arts had acquired the New Pickle Circus. The San Francisco School of Circus Arts was founded in 1984, as a project of the Pickle Family Circus, which in turn was founded ten years earlier.

The Circus Center offers training for adults and children in recreational, amateur and professional circus arts. These conservatories focus individually on Clowning, Aerial Arts, and Contortion. The Circus Center also offers live performances showcasing students and staff.

== Charitable efforts ==
In 2008, the Clown Conservatory produced a "naked clown calendar" to raise money for research and advocacy for multiple sclerosis.
