= Pickle Family Circus =

Defunct US circus

- Pickle Family Circus logo

Origin
- Country: United States
- Founder(s): Peggy Snider; Lawrence Pisoni; Michael Nolan
- Year founded: 1974; 52 years ago
- Defunct: December 31, 2003; 22 years ago

Information
- Ringmaster(s): no
- Traveling show?: Yes
- Circus tent?: No
- Winter quarters: San Francisco, California, U.S.
- Type of acts: Juggling

The Pickle Family Circus was a small circus founded in 1974 in San Francisco, California, United States. The circus formed an important part of the renewal of the American circus. They also influenced the creation of Cirque du Soleil in Montreal. Neither circus features animals or use the three-ring layout like the traditional circus.

== History ==
After working with the San Francisco Mime Troupe, the Pickle Family Jugglers (founded by Peggy Snider, Larry Pisoni, and Cecil MacKinnon) decided to create the Pickle Family Circus. Their first show was in May 1975, in the gymnasium of John O'Connell School in San Francisco. After they received a grant from the National Endowment for the Arts in 1976, they went on their first tour, going to five cities in Northern California. During the late 1970s and early 1980s, the Circus performed on weekends in the San Francisco Bay area during Spring and Fall, and toured for 3 months in the summer, mostly in towns along Highway 101 in Northern California and Oregon. In these years, the Pickles operated with a business model that every show was a benefit, usually for a local community organization. The local sponsor sold advance tickets (getting a portion of the revenue), did publicity and site preparation, and ran a midway. The Circus returned to the same towns year after year, and these events became an important source of funding for the sponsors. This freed the company from much of the advance work. In 1979, the Pickles extended their tour to perform at the Alaska State Fair in Palmer, Alaska, and in 1981 performed a two-month winter run at the Roundhouse Theater in London.

A critical part of the early financing of the Circus was through the federally funded Comprehensive Employment and Training Act, or CETA Arts Program, founded by John Kreidler under the San Francisco Arts Commission in 1974-75. Under this program, Larry Pisoni, Bill Irwin, Geoff Hoyle and Michael Nolan were employed. John Kreidler's Alameda County Neighborhood Arts Program was the Pickles' first fiscal sponsor, which received the $10,000 NEA grant. Nolan secured the grant with the assistance of Eric Reuther and then proceeded to book the first tour of Northern California. Among the sponsors was Bill Irwin's mom, Liz Irwin, and her nonprofit Senior Center in Ft. Bragg, the Redwood Coast Senior Center.

=== Early years ===
In the early years, the circus boasted three clowns: Larry Pisoni, Bill Irwin, and Geoff Hoyle; they were the stars of a Pickle Family Circus production in 1981 called Three High. After Irwin left the Pickles in 1979, Pisoni and Hoyle worked as a duo. It was at this point that Hoyle evolved his Mr. Sniff character. The clowns were always central to the Pickle performance, making multiple cameo appearances throughout the show and interacting with the other artists.

The early company operated on three fundamental principles: All decisions were made collectively by the entire group, all members got the same pay, and all performers also had offstage jobs. Only a very few company members did not perform, serving the need to maintain an ongoing office while the company was on tour, and to have one person on hand who could get dirty during the show. The company had its office and rehearsal space in a former church at 400 Missouri Street at the corner of 19th Street in the Potrero Hill neighborhood of San Francisco, and many of its members lived in and were active in that community.

=== Juggling ===
Juggling was always an essential part of the Pickle Family Circus, and every show ended with the "Big Juggle", involving almost every cast member in intricate club passing patterns.

=== In film ===
Several members of the Pickle Family Circus were in the 1980 movie Popeye starring Robin Williams, including Bill Irwin (playing Ham Gravy), Larry Pisoni (Chico), Geoff Hoyle (Scoop), Peggy Snider (playing Pickelina and credited as Peggy Pisoni), and Judy Finelli.
