= Dancing with the Stars (American TV series) season 23 =

Dancing with the Stars
- Season 23
- Promotional poster, featuring pro dancers Sharna Burgess and Artem Chigvintsev
- Hosted by: Tom Bergeron; Erin Andrews
- Judges: Carrie Ann Inaba; Len Goodman; Bruno Tonioli; Julianne Hough
- Celebrity winner: Laurie Hernandez
- Professional winner: Valentin Chmerkovskiy
- No. of episodes: 15

Release
- Original network: ABC
- Original release: September 12 – November 22, 2016

Season chronology
- ← Previous; Season 22 Next → Season 24

Season twenty-three of Dancing with the Stars premiered on September 12, 2016, on the ABC network.

On November 22, 2016, Olympic gymnast Laurie Hernandez, made history as the youngest winner in the show's history, at age 16, and she was partnered with Valentin Chmerkovskiy. IndyCar driver James Hinchcliffe and Sharna Burgess finished in second place, and Detroit Lions wide receiver Calvin Johnson Jr. and Lindsay Arnold finished third.

== Cast ==
=== Couples ===
This season featured thirteen celebrity contestants. The first eight professional dancers were revealed on Good Morning America on August 23, 2016: Lindsay Arnold, Sharna Burgess, Witney Carson, Artem Chigvintsev, Val Chmerkovskiy, Sasha Farber, Allison Holker, and Gleb Savchenko. The other returning dancers were later announced: Emma Slater, Maksim Chmerkovskiy, Derek Hough, and Cheryl Burke. Jenna Johnson was the only new pro this season, having previously been a member of the troupe.

The full cast was revealed on August 30, 2016, on Good Morning America.

Celebrity	Notability	Professional partner	Status	Ref.
Jake T. Austin	Actor	Jenna Johnson	Eliminated 1st on September 20, 2016	
Rick Perry	Governor of Texas	Emma Slater	Eliminated 2nd on September 27, 2016	
Babyface	Singer-songwriter & record producer	Allison Holker	Eliminated 3rd & 4th on October 4, 2016	
Vanilla Ice	Rapper & actor	Witney Carson	Eliminated 3rd & 4th on October 4, 2016	
Amber Rose	Model & actress	Maksim Chmerkovskiy	Eliminated 5th on October 17, 2016	
Maureen McCormick	Actress & author	Artem Chigvintsev	Eliminated 6th on October 24, 2016	
Ryan Lochte	Olympic swimmer	Cheryl Burke	Eliminated 7th on October 31, 2016	
Marilu Henner	Actress, broadcaster & author	Derek Hough	Eliminated 8th on November 7, 2016	
Terra Jolé	Reality television personality	Sasha Farber	Eliminated 9th on November 14, 2016	
Jana Kramer	Country music singer & actress	Gleb Savchenko	Eliminated 10th on November 21, 2016	
Calvin Johnson Jr.	NFL wide receiver	Lindsay Arnold	Third place on November 22, 2016	
James Hinchcliffe	IndyCar driver	Sharna Burgess; Jenna Johnson (Weeks 8-9)	Runners-up on November 22, 2016	
Laurie Hernandez	Olympic artistic gymnast	Valentin Chmerkovskiy	Winners on November 22, 2016	

=== Hosts and judges ===
Tom Bergeron and Erin Andrews returned as hosts, and Carrie Ann Inaba, Len Goodman, and Bruno Tonioli returned as judges. On August 26, 2016, it was reported that Julianne Hough would return to the show as a judge following a one-season hiatus. Due to a personal tragedy, Erin Andrews took a week off from her co-hosting duties and former pro Kym Johnson-Herjavec filled in during the results show in week 3. On October 17, Pitbull took over Len Goodman's position as a guest judge for week 6. On November 7, Idina Menzel took over for Goodman as a guest judge for week 9.

=== Dance troupe ===
The troupe consisted of returning members Alan Bersten, Brittany Cherry, Hayley Erbert, and Dennis Jauch, joined by former pro Keo Motsepe and new member Britt Stewart.

== Episodes ==
No. overall	No. in season	Title	Rating (18–49)	Original release date	U.S. viewers (millions)
385	1	"First Dances"	2.10	September 12, 2016	12.19
386	2	"TV Night"	1.71	September 19, 2016	10.71
387	3	"TV Night: Results"	1.50	September 20, 2016	8.60
388	4	"Face-off Night"	1.79	September 26, 2016	10.83
389	5	"Face-off Night: Results"	1.34	September 27, 2016	8.06
390	6	"Cirque du Soleil Night"	1.70	October 3, 2016	10.73
391	7	"Cirque du Soleil Night: Results"	1.44	October 4, 2016	9.12
392	8	"Most Memorable Year"	1.61	October 10, 2016	10.43
393	9	"Latin Night"	1.58	October 17, 2016	10.55
394	10	"Eras Night"	1.63	October 24, 2016	11.03
395	11	"Halloween Night"	1.48	October 31, 2016	10.39
396	12	"Showstoppers Night"	1.58	November 7, 2016	10.84
397	13	"Semifinals"	1.66	November 14, 2016	11.34
398	14	"Finals: Night 1"	1.82	November 21, 2016	11.97
399	15	"Finals: Night 2"	1.78	November 22, 2016	10.97

== Scoring chart ==
The highest score each week is indicated in bold green with a dagger (†), while the lowest score each week is indicated in italicized red with a double-dagger (‡).

Color key:

Winners
Runners-up
Third place
Eliminated

Dancing with the Stars (season 23) - Weekly scores
Couple	Pl.	Week													
Couple	Pl.	1	2	1+2	3	4 (Note: The couples were scored on a 30-point scale due to the absence of Len Goodman.)	5	6	5+6	7	8	9	10	11	
Couple	Pl.	1	2	1+2	3	4	5	6	5+6	7	8	9	10	Night 1	Night 2
Laurie & Val	1st	**31**†	**32**†	**63**†	31	**30**†	25	37	62	34+35=69	30+3=33	40+40=**80**†	30+30=**60**†	38+40=**78**†	+40=**118**† (Note: This couple finished in first place.)
James & Sharna	2nd	**31**†	29	60	29	28	**29**†	38	**67**†	36+38=**74**†	30+5=**35**†	36+37=73	29+30=59	37+40=77	+40=117 (Note: This couple finished in second place.)
Calvin & Lindsay	3rd	26	28	54	**32**†	23	24‡	37	61	36+38=**74**†	30	37+37=74	26+30=56‡	35+40=75	+40=115‡ (Note: This couple finished in third place.)
Jana & Gleb	4th	27	29	56	26	23	26	**40**†	66	34+35=69	27+3=30	40+40=**80**†	28+30=58	35+36=71‡ (Note: This couple was eliminated.)	
Terra & Sasha	5th	25	31	56	30	25	27	30	57	34+35=69	24	38+36=74	30+30=**60**†		
Marilu & Derek	6th	27	29	56	28	21	27	34	61	29+35=64‡	23‡	36+36=72‡			
Ryan & Cheryl	7th	24	24	48	25	22	24‡	30	54	28+38=66	23+3=26				
Maureen & Artem	8th	22	26	48	28	24	24‡	31	55	28+38=66					
Amber & Maks	9th	24	24	48	25	24	24‡	28‡	52‡						
Vanilla Ice & Witney	10th	25	26	51	23‡	23									
Babyface & Allison	10th	26	30	56	25	18‡									
Rick & Emma	12th	20‡	22‡	42‡	23‡										
Jake & Jenna	13th	22	24	46											

== Weekly scores ==
Individual judges' scores in the charts below (given in parentheses) are listed in this order from left to right: Carrie Ann Inaba, Len Goodman, Julianne Hough, Bruno Tonioli.

=== Week 1: First Dances ===
Couples are listed in the order they performed. After Ryan & Cheryl's performance, two protesters were arrested for rushing to the stage and shouting at Lochte.

Couple	Scores	Dance	Music
Marilu & Derek	27 (7, 7, 6, 7)	Jive	"Can't Stop Dancin'" — Captain & Tennille
James & Sharna	31 (8, 8, 7, 8)	Foxtrot	"Live Life" — Zayde Wølf
Calvin & Lindsay	26 (7, 6, 6, 7)	Cha-cha-cha	"That's What I Like" — Flo Rida, feat. Fitz
Maureen & Artem	22 (6, 5, 5, 6)	Viennese waltz	"(You Make Me Feel Like) A Natural Woman" — Mary J. Blige
Babyface & Allison	26 (7, 6, 6, 7)	Foxtrot	"'Deed I Do" — Ray Charles
Amber & Maks	24 (6, 6, 6, 6)	Foxtrot	"Here" — Alessia Cara
Vanilla Ice & Witney	25 (7, 5, 6, 7)	Cha-cha-cha	"Ice Ice Baby" — Vanilla Ice
Jana & Gleb	27 (7, 6, 6, 8)	Viennese waltz	"Dangerous Woman" — Ariana Grande
Jake & Jenna	22 (5, 6, 5, 6)	Jive	"Kiss You" — One Direction
Rick & Emma	20 (5, 5, 5, 5)	Cha-cha-cha	"God Blessed Texas" — Little Texas
Terra & Sasha	25 (7, 6, 6, 6)	Jive	"Stuff Like That There" — Betty Hutton
Ryan & Cheryl	24 (6, 6, 6, 6)	Foxtrot	"Call Me Irresponsible" — Michael Bublé
Laurie & Val	31 (8, 8, 7, 8)	Cha-cha-cha	"American Girl" — Bonnie McKee

=== Week 2: TV Night ===
The couples performed one unlearned dance to famous TV theme songs, and are listed in the order they performed.

Couple	Scores	Dance	Music	Television show	Result
Maureen & Artem	26 (7, 6, 6, 7)	Quickstep	"The Brady Bunch Theme" — Peppermint Trolley Company	The Brady Bunch	Safe
Jana & Gleb	29 (7, 8, 7, 7)	Tango	"I Don't Want to Be" — Gavin DeGraw	One Tree Hill	Safe
Rick & Emma	22 (6, 5, 6, 5)	Quickstep	"Green Acres Theme" — Vic Mizzy	Green Acres	Safe
Calvin & Lindsay	28 (7, 7, 7, 7)	Foxtrot	"As Days Go By" — Jesse Frederick	Family Matters	Safe
Amber & Maks	24 (6, 6, 6, 6)	Viennese waltz	"Game of Thrones Theme" — Ramin Djawadi	Game of Thrones	Safe
Jake & Jenna	24 (6, 6, 6, 6)	Cha-cha-cha	"Go, Diego, Go! Theme" — George Noriega & Joel Someillan	Go, Diego, Go!	Eliminated
Vanilla Ice & Witney	26 (6, 7, 6, 7)	Foxtrot	"Love and Marriage" — Frank Sinatra	Married... with Children	Safe
Terra & Sasha	31 (8, 7, 8, 8)	Quickstep	"Bewitched Theme" — Howard Greenfield & Jack Keller	Bewitched	Safe
Babyface & Allison	30 (8, 7, 7, 8)	Argentine tango	"The X-Files" — Mark Snow	The X-Files	Safe
Laurie & Val	32 (8, 8, 8, 8)	Jive	"DuckTales Theme" — Mark Mueller	DuckTales	Safe
James & Sharna	29 (7, 7, 7, 8)	Paso doble	"The Walking Dead Theme"—Bear McCreary	The Walking Dead	Safe
Marilu & Derek	29 (7, 8, 7, 7)	Foxtrot	"Angela" — Bob James	Taxi	Safe
Ryan & Cheryl	24 (6, 6, 6, 6)	Quickstep	"The Muppet Show Theme" — Jim Henson & Sam Pottle	The Muppet Show	Safe

=== Week 3: Face-off Night ===
The couples were paired off into six sets, and each set of couples performed the same dance to different songs. The highest-scoring couple from each set won immunity and could not be eliminated. Any ties were broken by Len Goodman. Couples are listed in the order they performed.

Couple	Scores	Dance	Music	Result
Babyface & Allison	25 (7, 6, 6, 6)	Jive	"Great Gosh A'Mighty" — Little Richard	Safe
Jana & Gleb	26 (6, 7, 6, 7)	Jive	"Too Many Fish in the Sea" — Bette Midler	Immunity
Rick & Emma	23 (6, 5, 6, 6)	Paso doble	"Tamacun" — Rodrigo y Gabriela	Eliminated
Vanilla Ice & Witney	23 (6, 6, 5, 6)	Paso doble	"Save Tonight" — Zayde Wølf	Immunity
James & Sharna	29 (7, 7, 8, 7)	Cha-cha-cha	"Big Trouble" — Outasight	Immunity
Ryan & Cheryl	25 (6, 7, 6, 6)	Cha-cha-cha	"If It Ain't Love" — Jason Derulo	Safe
Terra & Sasha	30 (8, 7, 8, 7)	Viennese waltz	"Iris" — Goo Goo Dolls	Safe
Calvin & Lindsay	32 (8, 8, 8, 8)	Viennese waltz	"Woman's World" — BJ the Chicago Kid	Immunity
Amber & Maks	25 (7, 6, 6, 6)	Salsa	"Booty" — Jennifer Lopez, feat. Iggy Azalea	Safe
Maureen & Artem	28 (7, 7, 7, 7)	Salsa	"Tres Deseos" — Gloria Estefan	Immunity
Laurie & Val	31 (7, 8, 8, 8)	Tango	"Into the Sunset (Headhunterz radio edit)" — Crystal Lake, feat. Kifi	Immunity
Marilu & Derek	28 (7, 7, 7, 7)	Tango	"Battle Cry" — Imagine Dragons	Safe

=== Week 4: Cirque du Soleil Night ===
Individual judges' scores in this chart (given in parentheses) are listed in this order from left to right: Carrie Ann Inaba, Julianne Hough, Bruno Tonioli.

The couples performed one unlearned dance inspired by a Cirque du Soleil show, while acrobats, aerialists, dancers, and fire-stick performers from Cirque du Soleil performed alongside them. Two couples were eliminated at the end of the night. Couples are listed in the order they performed.

Couple	Scores	Dance	Music	Cirque du Soleil show	Result
Calvin & Lindsay	23 (8, 7, 8)	Charleston	"Bella Donna Twist" — Raphaël Beau	Kurios: Cabinet of Curiosities	Safe
Maureen & Artem	24 (8, 8, 8)	Argentine tango	"High Bar/Taiko" — Benoît Jutras	Mystère	Safe
Jana & Gleb	23 (8, 7, 8)	Foxtrot	"Here Comes the Sun" — The Beatles	The Beatles: LOVE	Safe
Marilu & Derek	21 (7, 7, 7)	Paso doble	"Battlefield" — René Dupéré	Kà	Safe
Amber & Maks	24 (8, 8, 8)	Argentine tango	"Tickle Tango" — Simon Carpentier	Zumanity	Safe
Ryan & Cheryl	22 (7, 7, 8)	Viennese waltz	"Jeux d'Eau" — Benoît Jutras	O	Safe
Babyface & Allison	18 (6, 6, 6)	Tango	"Come Together" — The Beatles	The Beatles: LOVE	Eliminated
Terra & Sasha	25 (9, 8, 8)	Samba	"Tzelma" — Benoît Jutras	O	Safe
Laurie & Val	30 (10, 10, 10)	Jazz	"The Way You Make Me Feel" — Michael Jackson	Michael Jackson: One	Safe
Vanilla Ice & Witney	23 (8, 7, 8)	Viennese waltz	"La Nouba" — Benoît Jutras	La Nouba	Eliminated
James & Sharna	28 (9, 9, 10)	Quickstep	"The Hollywood Wiz" — Guy Dubuc & Marc Lessard	Paramour	Safe

=== Week 5: Most Memorable Year Night ===
Individual judges' scores in the chart below (given in parentheses) are listed in this order from left to right: Carrie Ann Inaba, Julianne Hough, Bruno Tonioli.

The couples performed one unlearned dance to celebrate the most memorable year of their lives. No elimination took place this week. Couples are listed in the order they performed.

Couple	Scores	Dance	Music
Maureen & Artem	24 (8, 8, 8)	Foxtrot	"From the Ground Up" — Dan + Shay
Calvin & Lindsay	24 (8, 8, 8)	Jazz	"Ain't No Mountain High Enough" — Marvin Gaye & Tammi Terrell
Jana & Gleb	26 (9, 8, 9)	Contemporary	"In My Daughter's Eyes" — Martina McBride
Ryan & Cheryl	24 (8, 8, 8)	Contemporary	"A Song for You" — Leon Russell
Laurie & Val	25 (8, 9, 8)	Paso doble	"Rise" — Katy Perry
Marilu & Derek	27 (9, 9, 9)	Viennese waltz	"Surprise Yourself" — Jack Garratt
Amber & Maks	24 (8, 8, 8)	Samba	"Woman Up" — Meghan Trainor
James & Sharna	29 (10, 9, 10)	Tango	"The Right Time" — Yves V, feat. Mike James
Terra & Sasha	27 (9, 9, 9)	Contemporary	"Stand by Me" — Florence + The Machine

=== Week 6: Latin Night ===
Individual judges' scores in the chart below (given in parentheses) are listed in this order from left to right: Carrie Ann Inaba, Pitbull, Julianne Hough, Bruno Tonioli.

The couples danced a Latin-inspired routine. Couples are listed in the order they performed.

Couple	Scores	Dance	Music	Result
Ryan & Cheryl	30 (7, 8, 8, 7)	Salsa	"La Negra Tiene Tumbao" — Celia Cruz	Safe
Terra & Sasha	30 (7, 8, 8, 7)	Paso doble	"Don't Let Me Be Misunderstood" — Santa Esmeralda	Safe
Amber & Maks	28 (7, 7, 7, 7)	Cha-cha-cha	"Bla Bla Bla Cha Cha Cha" — Petty Booka	Eliminated
James & Sharna	38 (10, 9, 9, 10)	Rumba	"Need the Sun to Break" — James Bay	Safe
Marilu & Derek	34 (8, 9, 9, 8)	Cha-cha-cha	"Echa pa'lante" — Thalía	Safe
Jana & Gleb	40 (10, 10, 10, 10)	Argentine tango	"Hands to Myself" — Selena Gomez	Safe
Maureen & Artem	31 (8, 7, 8, 8)	Samba	"Mas que Nada" — Sérgio Mendes, feat. The Black Eyed Peas	Safe
Calvin & Lindsay	37 (9, 10, 9, 9)	Argentine tango	"Hotel California" — Eagles	Safe
Laurie & Val	37 (9, 9, 9, 10)	Salsa	"Light It Up" — Major Lazer, feat. Nyla & Fuse ODG	Safe

=== Week 7: Eras Night ===
The couples performed one unlearned dance and a team dance representing different historical eras. Couples are listed in the order they performed.

After a three-week absence, Len Goodman temporarily returned to the judges' table.

Couple	Scores	Dance	Era	Music	Result
Laurie & Val	34 (8, 8, 9, 9)	Quickstep	1960s	"One Fine Day" — The Chiffons	Safe
Ryan & Cheryl	28 (7, 7, 7, 7)	Rumba	1990s	"I Don't Want to Miss a Thing" — Aerosmith	Safe
Marilu & Derek	29 (7, 7, 8, 7)	Charleston	1920s	"Never Forget You" — Postmodern Jukebox, feat. Addie Hamilton	Safe
Calvin & Lindsay	36 (9, 9, 9, 9)	Jive	1950s	"Good Golly, Miss Molly" — Little Richard	Safe
Maureen & Artem	28 (7, 7, 7, 7)	Tango	1980s	"You Give Love a Bad Name" — Bon Jovi	Eliminated
Terra & Sasha	34 (9, 8, 9, 8)	Foxtrot	1930s	"Cheek to Cheek" — Ella Fitzgerald & Louis Armstrong	Safe
Jana & Gleb	34 (8, 8, 9, 9)	Samba	1970s	"Get Down Tonight" — KC and the Sunshine Band	Safe
James & Sharna	36 (9, 9, 9, 9)	Jitterbug	1940s	"In the Mood" — Glenn Miller	Safe
Calvin & Lindsay James & Sharna Maureen & Artem Ryan & Cheryl	38 (10, 9, 9, 10)	Freestyle (Team Past)	Past	"The Skye Boat Song" — Raya Yarbrough	
Jana & Gleb Laurie & Val Marilu & Derek Terra & Sasha	35 (8, 9, 9, 9)	Freestyle (Team Future)	Future	"Embrace" — Armin van Buuren, feat. Eric Vloeimans	

=== Week 8: Halloween Night ===
Individual judges' scores in the chart below (given in parentheses) are listed in this order from left to right: Carrie Ann Inaba, Julianne Hough, Bruno Tonioli.

Couples performed one unlearned dance. The couple with the highest score earned immunity from elimination, while the rest of the couples participated in dance-offs for extra points. Because Calvin, Laurie, and James all earned perfect scores, the tiebreaker was cumulative points over the season, which resulted in James winning immunity and a five-point bonus. For each dance-off, the couple with the highest score picked the opponent against whom they wanted to dance; the chosen opponent was allowed to pick the dance style (cha-cha-cha, jive, or salsa). The winner of each dance-off earned three bonus points. Couples are listed in the order they performed.

James Hinchcliffe performed with Jenna Johnson after Sharna Burgess sustained an injury the week before.

Couple	Scores	Dance	Music	Result
Terra & Sasha	24 (8, 8, 8)	Cha-cha-cha	"Day-O (The Banana Boat Song)" — Harry Belafonte	Safe
Laurie & Val	30 (10, 10, 10)	Viennese waltz	"Pure Imagination" — Jane Monheit	Safe
Marilu & Derek	23 (7, 8, 8)	Argentine tango	"Sweet Dreams (Are Made of This)" — Emily Browning	Safe
Calvin & Lindsay	30 (10, 10, 10)	Quickstep	"Dr. Bones" — Cherry Poppin' Daddies	Safe
Ryan & Cheryl	23 (7, 8, 8)	Tango	"Howlin' for You" — The Black Keys	Eliminated
Jana & Gleb	27 (9, 9, 9)	Jazz	"Little Shop of Horrors" — Alan Menken	Safe
James & Jenna	30 (10, 10, 10)	Viennese waltz	"You Don't Own Me" — Grace, feat. G-Eazy	Immunity

Dance-offs
Couple	Dance	Music	Result
Laurie & Val (Note: Laurie & Val received votes from all three judges, plus the public vote (63%).)	Jive	"The Purple People Eater" — Sheb Wooley	Winners
Calvin & Lindsay	Jive	"The Purple People Eater" — Sheb Wooley	Losers
Jana & Gleb (Note: Jana & Gleb received votes from Julianne and Bruno, plus the public vote (54%).)	Salsa	"Magic" — Robin Thicke	Winners
Terra & Sasha (Note: Terra & Sasha received one vote from Carrie Ann.)	Salsa	"Magic" — Robin Thicke	Losers
Ryan & Cheryl (Note: Ryan & Cheryl received votes from Carrie Ann and Julianne, plus the public vote (58%).)	Cha-cha-cha	"Can't Feel My Face" — The Weeknd	Winners
Marilu & Derek (Note: Marilu & Derek received one vote from Bruno.)	Cha-cha-cha	"Can't Feel My Face" — The Weeknd	Losers

=== Week 9: Showstoppers Night ===
Individual judges' scores in the chart below (given in parentheses) are listed in this order from left to right: Carrie Ann Inaba, Idina Menzel, Julianne Hough, Bruno Tonioli.

Couples performed one musical theatre-inspired dance and a team-up dance with another couple, which involved the celebrities dancing side-by-side to the same song and receiving the same set of scores from the judges for the routine. Couples are listed in the order they performed.

Jenna Johnson performed again with James Hinchcliffe this week.

Couple	Scores	Dance	Music	Musical	Result
Marilu & Derek	36 (9, 9, 9, 9)	Samba	"December, 1963 (Oh, What a Night)" — The Four Seasons	Jersey Boys	Eliminated
Calvin & Lindsay	37 (9, 9, 10, 9)	Waltz	"Memory" — Leona Lewis	Cats	Safe
James & Jenna	36 (9, 9, 9, 9)	Jazz	"A Brand New Day" — Luther Vandross	The Wiz	Safe
Terra & Sasha	38 (10, 10, 9, 9)	Charleston	"If My Friends Could See Me Now" — Cy Coleman	Sweet Charity	Safe
Jana & Gleb	40 (10, 10, 10, 10)	Waltz	"She Used to Be Mine" — Sara Bareilles	Waitress	Safe
Laurie & Val	40 (10, 10, 10, 10)	Argentine tango	"Cell Block Tango" — Kander and Ebb	Chicago	Safe
James & Jenna Calvin & Lindsay	37 (9, 9, 10, 9)	Paso doble	"No Good" — Kaleo		
Marilu & Derek Terra & Sasha	36 (9, 9, 9, 9)	Jazz	"Big Noise from Winnetka" — Bette Midler		
Laurie & Val Jana & Gleb	40 (10, 10, 10, 10)	Contemporary	"Bird Set Free" — Sia		

=== Week 10: Semifinals ===
Individual judges' scores in the chart below (given in parentheses) are listed in this order from left to right: Carrie Ann Inaba, Julianne Hough, Bruno Tonioli.

The couples performed an unlearned dance and a trio dance involving an eliminated pro or a member of the troupe.

Couple	Trio partner	Scores	Dance	Music	Result
James & Sharna	Jenna Johnson	29 (9, 10, 10)	Argentine tango	"Santa María (del Buen Ayre)" — Gotan Project	Safe
James & Sharna	Jenna Johnson	30 (10, 10, 10)	Jive	"Gimme Some Lovin'" — The Spencer Davis Group	Safe
Terra & Sasha	Artem Chigvintsev	30 (10, 10, 10)	Rumba	"Scars to Your Beautiful" — Alessia Cara	Eliminated
Terra & Sasha	Artem Chigvintsev	30 (10, 10, 10)	Tango	"Hideaway" — Kiesza	Eliminated
Jana & Gleb	Alan Bersten	28 (9, 9, 10)	Quickstep	"Go Mama" — Wayne Beckford	Safe
Jana & Gleb	Alan Bersten	30 (10, 10, 10)	Paso doble	"Kill of the Night" — Gin Wigmore	Safe
Calvin & Lindsay	Witney Carson	26 (8, 9, 9)	Tango	"Seven Nation Army" — The White Stripes	Safe
Calvin & Lindsay	Witney Carson	30 (10, 10, 10)	Salsa	"Limbo" — Daddy Yankee	Safe
Laurie & Val	Maksim Chmerkovskiy	30 (10, 10, 10)	Foxtrot	"Hollow" — Tori Kelly	Safe
Laurie & Val	Maksim Chmerkovskiy	30 (10, 10, 10)	Samba	"Magalenha" —Sérgio Mendes, feat. Carlinhos Brown	Safe

=== Week 11: Finals ===
Individual judges' scores in the chart below (given in parentheses) are listed in this order from left to right: Carrie Ann Inaba, Len Goodman, Julianne Hough, Bruno Tonioli.

On the first night, the couples performed a redemption dance and their freestyle routine, after which a final couple was eliminated. On the second night, the final three couples performed a fusion dance that combined two dance styles. Couples are listed in the order they performed.

After a three-week absence, Len Goodman returned to the judges' table for the finals.

Night 1

Couple	Scores	Dance	Music	Result
Calvin & Lindsay	35 (8, 9, 9, 9)	Viennese waltz	"I Am Your Man" — Ryan Shaw	Safe
Calvin & Lindsay	40 (10, 10, 10, 10)	Freestyle	"I Want You Back" — The Jackson 5 "Please Mr. Postman" — The Marvelettes	Safe
Jana & Gleb	35 (8, 9, 9, 9)	Tango	"Stay the Night" — Zedd, feat. Hayley Williams	Eliminated
Jana & Gleb	36 (9, 9, 9, 9)	Freestyle	"Unstoppable" — Sia	Eliminated
Laurie & Val	38 (9, 10, 9, 10)	Paso doble	"Wicked Ones" — Dorothy	Safe
Laurie & Val	40 (10, 10, 10, 10)	Freestyle	"Brand New" — Ben Rector	Safe
James & Sharna	37 (9, 9, 9, 10)	Foxtrot	"It Had to Be You" — Harry Connick Jr.	Safe
James & Sharna	40 (10, 10, 10, 10)	Freestyle	"Beethoven's 5 Secrets" — The Piano Guys	Safe

Night 2

Couple	Scores	Dance	Music	Result
James & Sharna	40 (10, 10, 10, 10)	Foxtrot & Viennese waltz	"Over and Over Again" — Nathan Sykes, feat. Ariana Grande	Runners-up
Calvin & Lindsay	40 (10, 10, 10, 10)	Jive & Quickstep	"Tutti Frutti" — Little Richard	Third place
Laurie & Val	40 (10, 10, 10, 10)	Argentine tango & Foxtrot	"We Are the Ones" — Myon	Winners

== Dance chart ==
The couples performed the following each week:

- Weeks 1–5: One unlearned dance
- Week 6: One unlearned Latin dance
- Week 7: One unlearned dance & team dance
- Week 8: One unlearned dance & dance-offs
- Week 9: One unlearned dance & team-up challenge
- Week 10 (Semifinals): One unlearned dance & trio dance
- Week 11 (Finals, Night 1): Redemption dance & freestyle
- Week 11 (Finals, Night 2): Fusion dance

Color key:

No scores received

Dancing with the Stars (season 23) - Dance chart
Couple	Week																	
Couple	1	2	3	4	5	6	7		8		9		10		11			
Couple	1	2	3	4	5	6	7		8		9		10		Night 1		Night 2	
Laurie & Val	Cha-cha-cha	Jive	Tango	Jazz	Paso doble	Salsa	Quickstep	Team Freestyle	Viennese waltz	Jive	Argentine tango	Contemp.	Foxtrot	Samba	Paso doble	Freestyle	Samba (Note: No scores were received for this dance.)	Argentine tango & Foxtrot
James & Sharna	Foxtrot	Paso doble	Cha-cha-cha	Quickstep	Tango	Rumba	Jitterbug	Team Freestyle	Viennese waltz	Immunity	Jazz	Paso doble	Argentine tango	Jive	Foxtrot	Freestyle	Quickstep	Foxtrot & Viennese waltz
Calvin & Lindsay	Cha-cha-cha	Foxtrot	Viennese waltz	Charleston	Jazz	Argentine tango	Jive	Team Freestyle	Quickstep	Jive	Waltz	Paso doble	Tango	Salsa	Viennese waltz	Freestyle	Argentine tango	Jive & Quickstep
Jana & Gleb	Viennese waltz	Tango	Jive	Foxtrot	Contemp.	Argentine tango	Samba	Team Freestyle	Jazz	Salsa	Waltz	Contemp.	Quickstep	Paso doble	Tango	Freestyle	Argentine tango	
Terra & Sasha	Jive	Quickstep	Viennese waltz	Samba	Contemp.	Paso doble	Foxtrot	Team Freestyle	Cha-cha-cha	Salsa	Charleston	Jazz	Rumba	Tango				
Marilu & Derek	Jive	Foxtrot	Tango	Paso doble	Viennese waltz	Cha-cha-cha	Charleston	Team Freestyle	Argentine tango	Cha-cha-cha	Samba	Jazz						
Ryan & Cheryl	Foxtrot	Quickstep	Cha-cha-cha	Viennese waltz	Contemp.	Salsa	Rumba	Team Freestyle	Tango	Cha-cha-cha								
Maureen & Artem	Viennese waltz	Quickstep	Salsa	Argentine tango	Foxtrot	Samba	Tango	Team Freestyle										
Amber & Maks	Foxtrot	Viennese waltz	Salsa	Argentine tango	Samba	Cha-cha-cha												
Vanilla Ice & Witney	Cha-cha-cha	Foxtrot	Paso doble	Viennese waltz														
Babyface & Allison	Foxtrot	Argentine tango	Jive	Tango														
Rick & Emma	Cha-cha-cha	Quickstep	Paso doble															
Jake & Jenna	Jive	Cha-cha-cha																
