= Drawn to Life (Cirque du Soleil) =

Cirque du Soleil show

- Poster for Cirque du Soleil's Drawn to Life
- Company: Cirque du Soleil
- Genre: Contemporary circus
- Show type: Resident show
- Date of premiere: November 18, 2021
- Location: Disney Springs, Lake Buena Vista, Florida

Creative team
- Writer and Show Director: Michel Laprise
- Chief Creative Officer & Executive Producer: Diane Quinn
- Music Composer: Benoît Jutras
- Costume Designer: Philippe Guillotel
- Set Designer: Stephane Roy
- Choreographers: Kostiantyn Tomilchenko; Andrew Skeels; Lydia Bouchard
- Lighting designer: Martin Labrecque
- Sound Designer: Jonathan Deans
- Make-up Designer: Eleni Uranis

Other information
- Preceded by: 'Twas the Night Before (2019)
- Replaced: La Nouba
- Official website

Drawn to Life is a Cirque du Soleil show at Disney Springs' West Side at the Walt Disney World Resort in Lake Buena Vista, Florida. It is a contemporary circus performance featuring acrobats, gymnasts, and other skilled performers. A collaboration between Cirque du Soleil, Walt Disney Animation Studios, and Walt Disney Imagineering, the show is inspired by Disney's animated film productions and the process of animation. The show is performed in a custom-built, freestanding theater originally built for its predecessor La Nouba, which closed in 2017 after performing for 19 years.

== History ==
In March 2017, Cirque du Soleil and Disney announced that La Nouba would host its final performance on December 31, 2017. At that time, no plans for a new show were announced. On December 18, 2017, Disney announced that Cirque du Soleil would produce a new show to replace La Nouba that would "draw its inspiration from Disney's heritage of animation", though no further information was given. On August 26, 2019, tickets for the new production went on sale with preview performances to begin on March 20, 2020, and an official premiere date of April 17, 2020. The show was revealed to be about "a young girl and her father, who was a Disney animator" though the name of the show was not announced. On December 10, 2019, the name of the new production was announced as Drawn to Life, along with the show's synopsis and creative team.

On March 17, 2020, three days before the first scheduled performances, Cirque du Soleil announced that the opening of the show would be postponed due to the COVID-19 pandemic. On March 19, 2020, Cirque du Soleil announced it would lay off 95% of its staff worldwide due to the impacts of the pandemic. In July 2020, with no new opening date announced, tickets were made available for purchase on the Cirque du Soleil website for performances beginning November 5, 2020. In August 2020, performances through February 10, 2021 were removed from sale and ticketholders were refunded.

In an April 2021 interview with the Los Angeles Times, Cirque du Soleil CEO Daniel Lemarre stated that Drawn to Life "should be able to open sometime in the fall". On August 17, 2021, Disney announced that tickets would go on sale starting August 20 for performances beginning November 18, 2021. The show began previews on March 20, 2020 and had its first public performance on November 18, 2021, as part of Walt Disney World's 50th Anniversary celebration.

== Set and technical information ==
The theater housing Drawn to Life was the first freestanding permanent structure built for Cirque du Soleil, originally built for La Nouba. The theater was designed by Michel Crête, Michel Aubé of Scéno Plus, Walt Disney Imagineering, and the architects of the Rockwell Group of New York. The building incorporates elements of fabric and tension reminiscent of the form of a circus tent.

== Acts ==
The show contains the following acts:

- The Inner World of Animation - Synchronized acrobatics on an inflatable airbag mat
- Aerial Pencil - An acrobat guides an aerial pole, stylized as a giant pencil, to soar across and above the stage while performing stunts as a nod to the pencil test used by animators. The aerial pencil act is created and performed by Saulo Sarmiento.
- Forest - Icarian Games
- Animating A Ball - Juggling
- Dream of Colors - Cradle Wheel/Aerial Hoops
- Garden of Lines - Synchronized unicycles, inspired by the Blue Fairy from Pinocchio
- The Old Mill - A double wheel of death inspired by the 1937 animated short of the same name
- Hand to Hand Love
- Squash & Stretch - Teeterboard
- Swing to Swing - Russian Swings

=== Retired acts ===
- Forest and Stilts - The larger-than-life movements of stilt-walking are skillfully made via the three-meter extensions of their body. Communicating with Julie—and at times entirely trusting themselves—the artist demonstrates immense strength and balance, presenting stilt walking in a captivating and culturally inspired way. (November 18th, 2021 - December 2022)

== Music ==
The music for Drawn to Life is composed by Benoît Jutras, who also composed the music for La Nouba.
