= Chair acrobatics =

Type of acrobatics done using chairs

Chair balancing

The use of chairs as props in acrobatics falls into three broad categories: balancing, vaulting and contortion.

== Balancing ==
In chair balancing, one or more acrobats balance on one or more chairs. The chair(s) may be balanced on other objects and/or on just one or two legs while the acrobat(s) themselves may also perform balancing acts on the chair.

The chairs used in balance may have notches cut out or extra pieces of material added to allow them to be stacked at otherwise unstable angles.

Chair balancing acts have been featured in the Cirque du Soleil shows Nouvelle Experience, La Nouba, Dralion, Koozå, Kurios, and Crystal.

== Vaulting ==
In chair vaulting, the acrobat jumps or tumbles over a chair. Sometimes the chair is used as a launching platform, and sometimes it is carried by the athlete while performing the vault.

== Contortion ==
Chair contortionist

Chair contortionists use the chair as a prop for moulding their bodies around.
