= Cirque du Soleil: Worlds Away =

- Theatrical release poster
- Directed by: Andrew Adamson
- Written by: Andrew Adamson
- Produced by: Martin Bolduc; Andrew Adamson; Aron Warner
- Cinematography: Brett Turnbull
- Edited by: Sim Evan-Jones; Dirk Westervelt
- Music by: Benoît Jutras; Stephen Barton
- Production companies: Cirque du Soleil; Reel FX Creative Studios; Strange Weather Films; Cameron/Pace Group
- Distributed by: Paramount Pictures
- Release dates: October 20, 2012 (Tokyo); December 21, 2012 (United States)
- Running time: 91 minutes
- Country: United States
- Language: English
- Budget: $25 million
- Box office: $34 million

Cirque du Soleil: Worlds Away is a 2012 American 3D family fantasy film directed by Andrew Adamson. The film premiered on October 20, 2012, at the Tokyo International Film Festival, and was released theatrically in the United States on December 21, 2012.

Distributed worldwide by Paramount Pictures on December 21, 2012, the film tells the story of a girl named Mia going to a traveling circus and falling in love with its main attraction, the Aerialist. After the Aerialist falls during his act, he and Mia are transported to another world where each encounter the different worlds of Cirque du Soleil. It stars Erica Linz and Igor Zaripov as the main characters and incorporates acts from O, Mystère, Kà, Love, Zumanity, Criss Angel Believe, and Viva Elvis, some of the Cirque du Soleil shows that were running in Las Vegas in 2011.

Eels performed a song titled "Calling for Your Love" for the movie.

== Plot ==
Mia, a young woman in a small American Midwestern town, goes to a traveling carnival one evening, where she is urged by a silent clown to visit the carnival's circus and see the Aerialist, the show's star attraction. She is entranced by the Aerialist, but during his act he misses a catch and falls to the ground. She rushes to help him, but then the ground beneath them gives way and they fall into the dreamlike world of Cirque du Soleil. Separated, they travel through the different tent worlds trying to find each other, interacting with the strange and wonderful performers and performances of Cirque du Soleil. Mia and the Aerialist perform an aerial courtship for the grand finale.

== Cast ==
- Erica Linz as Mia
- Igor Zaripov as The Aerialist
- Lutz Halbhubner as Ringmaster
- Benedikt Negor as Le Vieux
- Dallas Barnett as Boss
- Tanya Drewery
- Sarah Houbolt
- Ascia Maybury
- Damien Gordon
- Zach Brickland
- Iren Goed
- Roufan Gan
- Pei Pei Lane
- Shaowei Xin
- Stephen Cooper
- Mengkai Shi
- James Fletcher
- Wenbo Zheng
- Mariska du Plessis
- Dan Hales
- Graham Candy
- Mike Baker
- Matt Gillanders
- Alan Thompson
- John Abraham
- Peter McPhail
- Maria Akhlatkina
- Alifia Alimova
- Zulfia Alimova
- Terry Bartlett
- Oomaa Bayartsogt
- Suzannah Bianco
- Stephen Bland
- P.J. Bogart
- Irina Borbounewitch
- Cinthia Bouhier
- Brynn Butzman
- Jorge Castano
- Luydmyla Chovhun
- Alexander Clements
- Johanne Clerk
- Jonathan Cole
- Danut Coseru
- Pierre Cottin
- Natalia Custurova
- Alessandro D'Agostini
- Namchinkhand Damba-Kaye
- Enkhjargal Dashbaljir
- Benjamin Deschamps
- Naranglia Dulamsuren
- Sylvie Dumaine
- Yuliya Eremina
- Junior Faitau
- Tatiana Frolova
- Olessia Gaidych
- Saraana Gantumur
- Aleksandr Gorshkov
- Daniel Headecker
- Yun Jin Hong
- Zoltan Jobbagy
- Andy Jones
- Erez Kaplan
- Evgeny Karasev
- Mika Kawabe
- Valerie Keft
- Kanako Kitao
- Miho Kono
- Toumany Kouyaté
- Kari Kreitzer
- Sergei Kuorovich
- Mikhail Lashchuk
- Caroline Lauzon
- Qiang Lei
- Julia Lopatkina
- Chelsea Luker
- Dena Massaro
- John Manson
- Bill May
- Noara Mello
- Anna Melnikova
- Tatyana Mironovich
- Benedikt Negro
- Tatiana Nikitenko
- Justice Orion
- Zipporah Peddle
- Eric Plante
- Kurt Rasmussen
- Steven Isijia Reynolds
- Briana Shaw Rüssi
- Volodymyr Rozbitskyy
- Regina Rufenacht
- Karl Sanft
- Chantale Sauvageau
- Katy Savoie
- Daria Shemiakina
- Paul Emile Shihadeh
- Natalia Sigwarth
- Craig Paul Smith
- Elena Solodowniküva
- Cristian Stefanescu
- Irina Syrova
- Isabelle Thomas
- Jozsef Tokar
- Florian Toussaint
- Turchmeg Turbat
- Olena Usik
- Norbert Virag
- Ray Wold
- Anja Wyttenbach
- Mai Yamamoto
- Anna Zarianova
- Vladimir Zibrov
- Francisco Alegria
- Sabu Alegria
- Andrian Nikolaev Angelov
- Ge Bai
- Jason Biltz
- Jeana Blackman
- Sergiy Bobrovnik
- Rochelle Collins
- Janine De Lorenzo
- Florent Deplanche
- Julie Duflos
- Yan Chao
- Nicolle Ford
- Hubert Gall
- Gail Gilbert
- Darin Good
- Sarah Guillot-Guyard
- Peng Guo
- Johan Guy
- Mathieu Guyard
- Jennifer Haight
- Cheri Haight
- Lionel Hamel
- Jason Hardabura
- Eric J. Henderson
- Marylène Hickock
- Vitaly Hudzenko
- Eric Jeffers
- Zeng Jiao Jian
- Derek Philip Jones
- Peter Kismartoni
- Emmanuel Kizayilawoko
- Jörg Lemke
- Dan Hong Li
- Zhong Zhi Lu
- Victoria Lubecki
- Tej Limlas Ly
- Teng-Meng Ly
- Chao Ma
- Summer Marik
- Brien McCrea
- Julie McInnes
- Brahim Meslem
- Ivan Mokrousov
- Emma Nicholson
- Gabryel Nogueira
- Reinaldo Noguti
- Spencer Novich
- Richard Oberacker
- Leonardo Oliveira Santos
- Jamie Pannucci
- Julia Parrot
- Mikhail Petrov
- Dongxing Qiu
- Robert Louis Robinson Jr.
- Matthew Salcedo
- Sami Saula
- Eric Scribner
- Chang Jun Shao
- Grygory Shevchenko
- Kun Shi
- Ya Hui Sun
- Pierre-Luc Sylvain
- Noriko Takahashi
- Arisa Takami
- Kelly Tucker
- Altanzul Ulambayar
- Su Ming Zhang
- Guangsheng Zou
- Jason Zulauf
- Jonas Zuniga
- Haoyuen Chen
- Alexander Dryjenko
- Roman Ermolenkov
- Sébastian Fortier
- Florence Gaillard
- Yevgen Kuz'min
- Xun Li
- Petro Marakhovskyy
- Alexandre Plotnikov
- Andrei Ridetski
- Dimitry Vorobiev
- Derrick Aldrich
- Lorin-Pierre Andre
- Andy Howard
- Wellington Lima
- David Locke
- Sheila Joy Buford
- Gyulnara Karaeva
- Sylvia Aderne
- Ekaterina Arnaoutova
- Joel Baker
- Marina Boutina
- Eugen Brim
- Marin Britten
- Tina Cannon
- Gianni Cardinale
- Kristofer Carrison
- Eve Castelo Branco
- Jimmie Cervera
- Roshan Chopra
- Jason Chu
- Ekenah Claudin
- Nathan Cooper
- Laura Cota
- Ryan Dawes
- Marco De Santi
- Youssef El Toufali
- Ryan Elrod
- Marc Englehart
- Reed Evans
- Delphine Gaillard
- Halil Gashi
- Mike Goodenough
- Wieslaw Haczkiewicz
- Ronald Harris
- Carrie Helms
- Khetanya Henderson
- Gaz Hopkins
- Joel Howard
- Tal Iozef
- Meredith Kerr
- Leisha Knight
- Alina Leiva
- Mariana Rodrigues Maekawa
- Ghislain Malardier
- Kishema Pendu Malik
- Cosmin Malita
- Marian Malita
- Nnete Campbell Manyesa
- Sandrine Mattei
- Bernhardt Mattes
- Cameron McKinlay
- Tumelo Michael Moloi
- Mukhtar Omar Sharif Mukhtar
- Charlotte O Dowd
- Rares Iulian Orzata
- Nolan Padilla
- Dakotah Rhoades
- Mason Roberts
- Melena Rounis
- Dmitro Rybikin
- David Schexnayder
- David Shay
- Taras Shevchenko
- Vladimir Sosnin
- Jonathan Strong
- Alexander Strownov
- Jake Van Orden
- Anne Weissbecker
- Rob Winch
- Wallace Zernich
- Kyle Zingler
- Chris Silcox
- Nicolas Bosc

== Soundtrack ==
- Calling
- Circus Marvelous
- The Aerialist
- Sandtrap
- Faraway Chapiteau
- Empty Theatre
- Rideau Rouge
- Squelette
- Reda
- Pieds II
- Steben
- Bateau
- Terre Brûlée
- Fontaines
- Coup d'état
- Slave Cage
- Fight for the Prisoner
- Battlefield
- Aftermath
- Washed Up
- The Pursuers
- Cliff
- The Last Pursuer
- Flight
- Love Dance
- Variation on Love Dance
- Mystère
- Got a Lot o' Livin' to Do
- Good Rockin' Tonight (sample)
- Baby Let's Play House
- Nostalgie
- Blackbird
- Octopus's Garden
- Lucy in the Sky with Diamonds
- Being for the Benefit of Mr. Kite
- Get Back
- While My Guitar Gently Weeps
- All You Need is Love

== Reception ==
This film received mixed reviews from critics. It has a rating of 43% on Rotten Tomatoes, based on 46 reviews and an average score of 5.30/10. The site's critics consensus reads, "Cirque Du Soleil loses its sense of wonder when bottled for the screen, with Worlds Away's shapeless story and relentless spectacle feeling hollow when divorced from the theatrical experience." On Metacritic, it has a rating of 51 out of 100, indicating "mixed or average" reviews, based on 16 reviews.

A. O. Scott of The New York Times gave this film a score of 3/5, and said that "For me, Cirque du Soleil will always be associated with the movie Knocked Up, in which the characters played by Seth Rogen and Paul Rudd take in a performance of Mystère under the influence of hallucinogenic mushrooms. If such a trip is not to your taste, or if a trip to Las Vegas is not on your calendar, you might opt for the relatively inexpensive, mildly mind-blowing Cirque du Soleil: Worlds Away, a new 3-D movie directed by Andrew Adamson."

== Awards ==
List of awards and nominations
| Award | Category | Nominee | Result |
|---|---|---|---|
| Golden Trailer Awards | The Don LaFontaine Award for Best Voice Over | Paramount Pictures and The AV Squad | Nominated |

== Home video ==
On March 12, 2013, Worlds Away was released on DVD and Blu-ray.
