= Quidam =

Former Cirque du Soleil production

- Logo for Cirque du Soleil's Quidam
- Company: Cirque du Soleil
- Genre: Contemporary circus
- Show type: Touring production
- Date of premiere: April 23, 1996 (Montréal, QC)
- Final show: February 26, 2016 (Christchurch, NZ)

Creative team
- Writer and director: Franco Dragone
- Director of creation: Gilles Ste-Croix
- Senior artistic director: Richard Dagenais
- Artistic director: Fabrice Lemire
- Composer: Benoît Jutras
- Costume designer: Dominique Lemieux
- Set designer: Michel Crête
- Lighting designer: Luc Lafortune
- Choreographer: Debra Brown
- Sound designer: François Bergeron
- Make-up designer: Nathalie Gagné
- Artistic guide: Guy Laliberté

Other information
- Preceded by: Alegría (1994)
- Succeeded by: O (1998)
- Official website

Quidam (/kiːˈdɑːm/ kee-DAHM) was the ninth stage show produced by Cirque du Soleil. It premiered in April 1996 and has been watched by millions of spectators around the world. Quidam originated as a big-top show in Montreal and was converted into an arena format beginning with its 2010 tour in North America. It then changed back to the Big Top for a 3-month run in Seoul, South Korea before returning to an arena show for its tour to Oceania. The show performed for the final time in Christchurch, New Zealand on February 26, 2016.

The entire show is imagined by a bored girl named Zoé who is alienated and ignored by her parents. She dreams up the whimsical world of Quidam as a means of escaping the monotony of her life.

The show's title refers to the feature character, a man without a head, carrying an umbrella and a bowler hat. Quidam is said to be the embodiment of both everyone and no one at the same time. According to Cirque du Soleil literature "Quidam: a nameless passer-by, a solitary figure lingering on a street corner, a person rushing past... One who cries out, sings and dreams within us all."

== Set and technical information ==
The minimalistic stage was designed by Michel Crête to represent a monolithic structure such as an airport or train station where people are always coming and going. The major set element includes the five, all-aluminum, 120-foot (36.57-meter) arches above the stage, known as the téléphérique. These allow performers to be transported onto and off the stage from above. Each rail of the téléphérique has two trolleys: one to raise and lower the performer or equipment, and the second to transport it onto or off the stage.

The stage floor is made of aluminum decks with a perforated, rubber-type mat. The perforations, of which there are over 200,000, allow light to pass through from below the stage, creating visual effects.

The original Quidam stage was redesigned and incorporated into the Bazzar (Cirque du Soleil) grand chapiteau tour. The show premiered in November 2018.

== Cast ==
The cast of Quidam has a cast of 45 acrobats, musicians, singers, and characters, some of which are detailed below.

- Zoé: She is the principal character and singer in Quidam. Although average in nature, she longs for excitement.
- Father: Completely, though unwittingly, self-absorbed, this character is lost behind his newspaper until he eventually open his eyes to find himself among his family and loved ones. His white shoes are the only indication of a hidden personality.
- Mother: Conveys an air of absence and alienation whilst inside her lie fear, frustration, and desire. Through the show, she rediscovers the intense feeling of being alive through pain and courage, play and love.
- Quidam: The show's titular character, who is anonymous, everyone, and no one (the name means "passer by"). He may have stepped out of a surrealist painting or been conjured up out of Zoé's imagination. He is known for his bowler hat and umbrella despite being headless.
- John/Mark: He is an eerie yet charming guide on our mysterious journey through the world of Quidam. Also is represented as a father figure to Zoé hence him stepping into her father's shoes. The character changed of 'John' was played initially by John Gilkey and then by Mark Ward who performed the role from 1999 onwards. Sometime after this transition, the character's name changed to 'Mark'.
- Target: A living human bullseye fired at by everyone but is always smiling.
- Chiennes Blanches: The silent chorus, the nameless and the faceless, the dehumanized, mechanical crowd, simultaneously leading and following. They also accompany the principal characters as they make their entrances and exits.
- Les Égarés: Lost individuals who gather together in the streets and abandoned buildings of Quidam. Many of them perform in the banquine act.
  - Boum-Boum: A pale skinned, bald character who wears boxing gloves. Enjoys screaming at the audience and walking away proudly, but will run away if an audience member screams back. He is aggressive and physically fit, yet extremely lifeless. It is as though his body lives on only because his soul refuses to leave it.
  - Aviator: This character runs around on stage with skeletal wings, but doesn’t look quite ready to take off. Perhaps he doesn’t know he has wings. Perhaps he knows, but can’t fly. Perhaps, like Icarus, he has tried and failed or perhaps he simply wants to escape this world and its problems.
  - Homme Rayé: Translating into English as the 'Striped man' due to his blue and red costume with white stripes. He is one of Les Égarés who has a scarred face.
  - Pierrot: Another of Les Égarés who is most noticeable when running across the stage in a long white gown and she has bright red hair.
  - Kangaroo: A character representing the youth in society, he wears a blue, sleeveless hood and is one of Les Égarés.
  - Blue Lady: A pale skin lady, always spinning on herself.
  - La Garçonne: One of Les Égarés, she is dressed in red and love skipping all the time.
  - Skipping Girl: One of Les Égarés, she is dressed in blue and love skipping all the time.
  - Ballerina: A strange character, he is dress with a tutu.
  - The Explorer
  - Rescapé
  - Romantic
  - Jujube
  - Oublié
  - La Mouche: An upbeat character that makes up Les Égarés, she is dressed entirely in light blue and green.
  - Funny Bunny/Peau D'ane: A character who chases and gets chased by other characters. A genius in ecology, lovey-dovey, and astrology. She is one of Les Égarés and is noticeable as a red rabbit on stage.
- Les Macloma: Three Tramp-like characters who serve as parodies of the traditional Whiteface, Auguste and Character clown archetypes. (1996-1997, 1999-2004)
- Les Frères Velasquez: Les Macloma's understudies during First European & Second North American Tour. (1999-2003)
- Les Don Quijoles: Les Macloma's understudies during the First Japanese Tour. (2003-2004)
- Kotini Jr. & Alosha: A duo of clowns that included Kotini Jr., (Portrayed by Konstantin Andreitchenko-Wübbe), and Alosha, (Portrayed by Alexey Mironov). (1997-1998)
- Toto & Voki: A duo of clowns who performed acts created by David Shiner. (2004-2016)

== Acts ==
Quidam combines a mix of acrobatic skills and traditional circus acts:

- German Wheel: An acrobat performs tricks within a German wheel, also known as Rhönrad
- Diabolo: Originally performed by four girls and later as a solo act, the performer manipulates up to 3 diabolos (i.e. Chinese yo-yo) at once. A diabolo is a wooden spool balance juggled by two sticks linked with a string.
- Clown Car: Toto attempts to flirt with a female audience member in an invisible car.
- Aerial contortion in silk: Intensity, power and grace combine when a young woman becomes one with the column of red fabric which supports and cradles her.
- Skipping ropes: Drawing inspiration from dance, acrobatics, and the art of manipulation, a group of 20 acrobats performs this familiar child's game in a steady stream of solo, duo, and group jumps and figures.
- Aerial hoops: Three performers use hoops attached to the ceiling to perform tricks.
- Handbalancing: Using strength and balance, a performer contorts into poses while on balancing canes.
- Spanish web: Artists fly over the stage, attached to trolleys on the overhead tracks. In turn or as a group, they occasionally perform a sudden drop, stopped only by the ropes looped around their waists or ankles.
- Statue: Never losing contact, two strong, flexible performers move almost imperceptibly, assuming positions impossible without an impeccable sense of balance.
- Clown Movie: Voki directs a comedic skit using audience members as actors. A similar version was originally performed in Nouvelle Experience.
- Banquine: An Italian acrobatic tradition going back to the Middle Ages that combines gymnastics and ballet. Showcasing the agility of the human body, up to 15 artists perform sequences of feats and human pyramids with their perfectly synchronized movements.

=== Acts in rotation ===
- Juggling: Up to five balls fly through the air, with additional manipulation of a briefcase, umbrella, and bowler hat.
- Dance Trapeze: A solo trapeze artist twirls over the stage on a trapeze strung from the telepherique.

=== Retired acts ===
- Cyr wheel: An acrobat performed tricks within a large metal ring. This act replaced German Wheel between 2012 and 2013.
- Manipulation: Three performers used warped metal sheets to juggle and manipulate a red ball that they each had; later in the act, they got rid of the metal sheet and juggled the red balls as well as many other red balls and a bowler hat each. This act was removed in 1998.
- Solo Aerial straps: A male single artist grasped cords that dangled from the overhead rails; sometimes he performed on the ground, sometimes in the air. This act was in rotation, and was performed in 1997 in replacement of the German Wheel act in very rare circumstances.
- Duo Aerial straps: Two artists grasped cords that dangled from the overhead rails; sometimes they performed on the ground, sometimes in the air. This act was performed during the Asia Pacific tour of 2004 - 2005.
- Hoops: A performer spun and manipulated up to 20 spinning hoops all over her body. This act was performed in place of Handbalancing in 2002 and 2008.
- Cloud swing: A unique combination of swinging trapeze and Spanish web techniques. This act was dropped from the show in 2012 due to issues with finance, and a single trapeze act temporarily replaced it. The cloud swing act returned to the show from 2012 to 2013 and during the Seoul, South Korea tour in 2015 because the promoter wanted to make the show as close to the original as possible during its final run under the Grand Chapiteau.
- Duplex trapeze: A performer did tricks on a two tiered trapeze. This act was a temporary replacement for the cloud swing act in 2012.
- Macloma: The Macloma interact with the audience.
- Montgolfiere: The Macloma play in hot air balloons.
- Balloon Song: The Macloma play a song with balloons and a broken violin.
- Hose: Alosha performs tricks with a long rubber hose.
- Ribbon: Alosha performs a comical parody of rhythmic gymnastics.
- Dance: Kotini Jr. performs an energetic breakdance with a chair.

=== Awards ===
Quidam's diabolo act won a Gold Medal at the 1995 Festival du Cirque de Demain. The show's banquine act won the Golden Clown at the 1999 International Monte Carlo Circus Festival.

== Costumes ==
Quidam's costume designer, Dominique Lemieux, drew inspiration from Surrealist art, particularly the works of René Magritte and Paul Delvaux. The costumes convey the alienation of the characters and represent an urban landscape through the use of painted textures and fabrics. The dominant color is grey but is supplemented by deep, rich, warm colors and embellished with metals. Quidam was the first Cirque du Soleil show to use everyday clothing for the outfits, although those in the acrobatic acts are modified. The fabric chosen for Quidam is primarily stretch linen, but also includes leather, jute, linen crepe, wool, velvet and 42 types of cotton.

Quidam has approximately 249 costumes, 500 costume accessories, and 200-300 shoes: Each artist has anywhere from 2 to 7 costumes, of which there are at least 2 spares. The costumes, although washed every day, can last anywhere from 6 months to 2 years.

== Music ==
Quidam’s music was composed by Benoît Jutras and has been released in three album editions featuring additional songs, alternative new cover designs, and higher quality sounds. The first CD was produced by Carl Marsh. It was co-arranged by Marsh and Jutras and released on January 14, 1997. (ASIN B000003G5M) The album features the voices of Audrey Brisson-Jutras and Mathieu Lavoie, with the exception of two bonus tracks sung by Brisson-Jutras and Richard Price on the extended CD released in 2001 (recorded live in Amsterdam, 1999).

Below is a list of tracks as featured on the original 1997 release, alongside each of which is listed the act that the track accompanies. The two tracks on the 2001 extended album are also included at the end: "Misère" and "Enfants d'Acier".

- Atmadja (Opening)
- Incantation
  - (German wheel) (1996–2012, 2014–2016)
  - (Cyr wheel) (2012–2014)
- Marelle (Interlude)
- Rivage
  - Manipulation (Second part of the act, 1996–1998)
  - Juggling (Second part of the act (1996–2003), Complete song for the act (2006 onward))
- Zydeko (Skipping ropes) (Second part of the act)
- Let Me Fall (Aerial contortion in silk) (First part of the act)
- Innocence (Skipping ropes) (First and final parts of the act)
- Carrousel
  - Clowns (First part of the song; Montgolfiere 1996-2004)
  - Transition out of Diabolos (Second part of the song; Badauds)
  - Transition out of Aerial hoops (Third part of the song: Parc Papillon)
- Steel Dreams
  - Handbalancing (1996–1998)
  - Aerial straps (2004–2005)
  - Dance Trapeze (2014–2016)
- Seisouso
  - Aerial hoops
  - Cloud Swing (First part of the song, Intro to the act, 1996-2012, 2013)
  - Trapeze Duplex (First part of the song, Intro to the act, 2012)
  - Dance Trapeze (First part of the song, Intro to the act, 2014–2016)
- Réveil (Statues)
- Quidam (Finale)
- Misère (Banquine)
- Enfants d'Acier (Diabolos)

Additional songs in the show not included on the album:

- Présentation (Pre-show)
- Petit Salon (Opening)
- Procession (Intro to wheel act)
- Mana (Solo Aerial straps, 1997 only)
- Handbalancing
  - Handbalancing (1999–2001, 2003–2016)
  - Hula Hoops (2002, 2008)
- Isabelle (Aerial contortion in silk, Second part of the act)
- Corde Lisse (Spanish Webs)
- Cerceau (Aerial hoops, first and third part of the act)
- Shape (Manipulation, First part of the act, 1996–1998)
- Équilibre (Handbalancing) (1996)
- Pleureuse (Hand to Hand exit)
- Clown Car (Clown act) (2004–2016)
- Clown Cinema (Clown act) (2004–2016)
- Yup Yup (Clown act) (1997–1998)
- Clown Hat (Clown act) (1997–1998)
- Hose (Clown act) (1997–1998)
- Ribbon (Clown act) (1997–1998)
- Ballon (Clown act) (1996–1997, 1999–2004)
- Montgolfiere (Clown act) (1996–1997, 1999–2004)
- Rain/Égarés (First act ending/ Second act opening)
- Walking in the air (Dans l'Air)
- Banquine (Banquine, Press Conference only, 1996)
- Petra
  - Cloud Swing (1996–2012, 2015)
  - Trapeze Duplex (2012)
- Animaux de Cirque (Transition to finale)

== Tour ==
Quidam started as a Grand Chapiteau touring show before being fully converted to an arena touring show in 2010. For a short time in 2009, Quidam toured the UK and IE in arena format before switching back to the Grand Chapiteau for its South America tour. After this, in 2010, Quidam was converted into the arena format where it began a North American, European and Asia-Pacific tour. However, during its run in Seoul in 2015, Quidam was temporarily reconverted to play under the Grand Chapiteau for three months before continuing its farewell tour in the arena format for its run in Australia and New Zealand. The show's 20-year tour visited 241 cities in 42 countries before it ended on February 26, 2016 in Christchurch, New Zealand.

Cirque du Soleil started using a customized tour bus as a method of helping to advertise Quidam during its tour in northeastern North America during the fall of 2011. During the show's stops in cities, the tour bus makes appearances at local merchants, allowing people to meet part of the crew.

The following colorboxes indicate the region of each performance: EU Europe NA North America SA South and Central America AP Asia/Pacific OC Oceania AF Africa

=== Arena tour ===
2009, 2010-2016

==== 2009 schedule ====
- EU London, UK – From 4 Jan to 15 Feb 2009
- EU Liverpool, UK – From 26 Feb to 1 Mar 2009
- EU Belfast, UK – From 4 Mar to 7 Mar 2009
- EU Newcastle, UK – From 12 Mar to 15 Mar 2009
- EU Birmingham, UK – From 18 Mar to 22 Mar 2009
- EU Manchester, UK – From 25 Mar to 27 Mar 2009
- EU Dublin, IE – From 31 Mar to 5 Apr 2009
- EU Sheffield, UK – From 9 Apr to 12 Apr 2009
- EU Glasgow, UK – From 16 Apr to 19 Apr 2009

==== 2010 schedule ====
- NA Kingston, ON – From 11 Dec to 14 Dec 2010
- NA Montréal, QC – From 18 Dec to 30 Dec 2010

==== 2011 schedule ====
- NA Québec, QC – From 4 Jan to 9 Jan 2011
- NA Chicoutimi, QC – From 12 Jan to 16 Jan 2011
- NA Vancouver, BC – From 9 Mar to 13 Mar 2011
- NA Everett, WA – From 16 Mar to 20 Mar 2011
- NA San Jose, CA – From 24 Mar to 27 Mar 2011
- NA San Diego, CA – From 30 Mar to 3 Apr 2011
- NA San Francisco, CA – From 6 Apr to 17 Apr 2011
- NA Long Beach, CA – From 20 Apr to 24 Apr 2011
- NA Ontario, CA – From 27 Apr to 1 May 2011
- NA Reno, NV – From 4 May to 8 May 2011
- NA Sacramento, CA – From 11 May to 15 May 2011
- NA London, ON – From 2 Jun to 5 Jun 2011
- NA Hamilton, ON – From 8 Jun to 12 Jun 2011
- NA Wilkes-Barre, PA – From 15 Jun to 19 Jun 2011
- NA Ottawa, ON – From 22 Jun to 30 Jun 2011
- NA St. John's, NL – From 6 Jul to 10 Jul 2011
- NA Saint John, NB – From 13 Jul to 17 Jul 2011
- NA Halifax, NS – From 20 Jul to 24 Jul 2011
- NA Providence, RI – From 27 Jul to 31 Jul 2011
- NA Hershey, PA – From 18 Aug to 21 Aug 2011
- NA Baltimore, MD – From 24 Aug to 28 Aug 2011
- NA Hartford, CT – From 31 Aug to 4 Sep 2011
- NA Boston, MA – From 7 Sep to 11 Sep 2011
- NA State College, PA – From 14 Sep to 18 Sep 2011
- NA Fort Wayne, IN – From 21 Sep to 25 Sep 2011
- NA Albany, NY – From 28 Sep to 2 Oct 2011
- NA Amherst, MA – From 5 Oct to 9 Oct 2011
- NA Pittsburgh, PA – From 12 Oct to 16 Oct 2011
- NA Milwaukee, WI – From 19 Oct to 23 Oct 2011
- NA Philadelphia, PA – From 10 Nov to 13 Nov 2011
- NA Washington, DC – From 16 Nov to 20 Nov 2011
- NA Greenville, SC – From 23 Nov to 27 Nov 2011
- NA Fayetteville, NC – From 30 Nov to 4 Dec 2011
- NA Hampton, VA – From 7 Dec to 11 Dec 2011
- NA Worcester, MA – From 14 Dec to 18 Dec 2011
- NA Toronto, ON – From 20 Dec to 30 Dec 2011

==== 2012 schedule ====
- NA Oshawa, ON - From 4 Jan to 8 Jan 2012
- NA Windsor, ON - From 11 Jan to 15 Jan 2012
- NA Detroit, MI - From 2 Feb to 5 Feb 2012
- NA Hoffman Estates, IL - From 8 Feb to 12 Feb 2012
- NA Springfield, IL - From 15 Feb to 19 Feb 2012
- NA Baton Rouge, LA - From 22 Feb to 26 Feb 2012
- NA Austin, TX - From 29 Feb to 4 Mar 2012
- NA Frisco, TX - From 7 Mar to 11 Mar 2012
- NA San Antonio, TX - From 14 Mar to 18 Mar 2012
- NA Champaign, IL - From 21 Mar to 25 Mar 2012
- NA Roanoke, VA - From 28 Mar to 1 Apr 2012
- NA Knoxville, TN - From 4 Apr to 8 Apr 2012
- NA Evansville, IN - From 26 Apr to 29 Apr 2012
- NA Green Bay, WI - From 1 May to 2 May 2012
- NA Duluth, MN - From 4 May to 6 May 2012
- NA Sault Ste. Marie, ON - From 10 May to 13 May 2012
- NA Saginaw, MI - From 16 May to 20 May 2012
- NA East Lansing, MI - From 23 May to 27 May 2012
- NA Grand Rapids, MI - From 30 May to 3 Jun 2012
- NA Toledo, OH - From 6 Jun to 10 Jun 2012
- NA Rockford, IL - From 13 Jun to 17 Jun 2012
- NA St. Louis, MO - From 20 Jun to 24 Jun 2012
- NA Indianapolis, IN - From 27 Jun to 1 Jul 2012
- NA Winnipeg, MB - From 19 Jul to 22 Jul 2012
- NA Regina, SK - From 25 Jul to 29 Jul 2012
- NA Lethbridge, AB - From 1 Aug to 5 Aug 2012
- NA Edmonton, AB - From 8 Aug to 12 Aug 2012
- NA Kamloops, BC - From 15 Aug to 19 Aug 2012
- NA Kelowna, BC - From 22 Aug to 26 Aug 2012
- NA Abbotsford, BC - From 29 Aug to 2 Sep 2012
- NA Victoria, BC - From 5 Sep to 9 Sep 2012
- NA Spokane, WA - From 12 Sep to 16 Sep 2012
- NA Honolulu, HI - From 4 Oc to 14 Oct 2012
- NA Eugene, OR - From 25 Oct to 28 Oct 2012
- NA West Valley City, UT - From 31 Oct to 4 Nov 2012
- NA Broomfield, CO - From 7 Nov to 11 Nov 2012
- NA Loveland, CO - From 14 Nov to 18 Nov 2012
- NA Columbus, OH - From 6 Dec to 9 Dec 2012
- NA Grand Forks, ND - From 14 Dec to 16 Dec 2012
- NA Sioux City, IA - From 18 Dec to 20 Dec 2012
- NA Des Moines, IA - From 22 Dec to 23 Dec 2012
- NA Kansas City, MO - From 26 Dec to 30 Dec 2012

==== 2013 schedule ====
- NA Wichita, KS - From 2 Jan to 6 Jan 2013
- NA Colorado Springs, CO - From 9 Jan to 13 Jan 2013
- NA Rio Rancho, NM - From 16 Jan to 20 Jan 2013
- NA El Paso, TX - From 23 Jan to 27 Jan 2013
- NA Laredo, TX - From 29 Jan to 31 Jan 2013
- NA Corpus Christi, TX - From 2 Feb to 3 Feb 2013
- NA Hidalgo, TX - From 6 Feb to 10 Feb 2013
- NA Little Rock, AR - From 28 Feb to 3 Mar 2013
- NA Houston, TX - From 6 Mar to 10 Mar 2013
- NA New Orleans, LA - From 13 Mar to 17 Mar 2013
- NA Mobile, AL - From 20 Mar to 24 Mar 2013
- NA North Charleston, SC - From 27 Mar to 31 Mar 2013
- NA Charlottesville, VA - From 3 Apr to 7 Apr 2013
- NA Norfolk, VA - From 10 Apr to 14 Apr 2013
- NA Greensboro, NC - From 17 Apr to 21 Apr 2013
- NA Columbia, SC - From 24 Apr to 28 Apr 2013
- NA Augusta, GA - From 30 Apr to 1 May 2013
- NA Macon, GA - From 3 May to 5 May 2013
- NA Savannah, GA - From 7 May to 9 May 2013
- NA Columbus, GA - From 11 May to 12 May 2013
- NA Orlando, FL - From 15 May to 19 May 2013
- NA Cedar Rapids, IA - From 6 June to 9 June 2013
- NA Dayton, OH - From 12 Jun to 16 Jun 2013
- NA Louisville, KY - From 19 Jun to 23 Jun 2013
- NA Nashville, TN - From 26 Jun to 30 Jun 2013
- NA Charlotte, NC - From 3 Jul to 7 Jul 2013
- NA Raleigh, NC - From 10 Jul to 14 Jul 2013
- NA Fairfax, VA - From 17 Jul to 21 Jul 2013
- NA Brooklyn, NY - From 24 Jul to 28 Jul 2013
- NA Sunrise, FL - From 31 Jul to 4 Aug 2013
- NA Estero, FL - From 7 Aug to 11 Aug 2013
- EU Graz, AT - From 5 Sep to 8 Sep 2013
- EU Vienna, AT - From 11 Sep to 15 Sep 2013
- EU Leipzig, DE - From 18 Sep to 22 Sep 2013
- EU Stuttgart, DE - From 25 Sep to 29 Sep 2013
- EU Innsbruck, AT - From 2 Oct to 6 Oct 2013
- EU Salzburg, AT - From 9 Oct to 13 Oct 2013
- EU Munich, DE - From 16 Oct to 20 Oct 2013
- EU Cologne, DE - From 23 Oct to 27 Oct 2013
- EU Frankfurt, DE - From 30 Oct to 3 Nov 2013
- EU Dortmund, DE - From 6 Nov to 10 Nov 2013
- EU Mannheim, DE - From 13 Nov to 17 Nov 2013
- EU Malaga, ES - From 5 Dec to 8 Dec 2013
- EU Zaragoza, ES - From 11 Dec to 15 Dec 2013
- EU Sevilla, ES - From 18 Dec to 22 Dec 2013
- EU A Coruña, ES - From 25 Dec to 29 Dec 2013

==== 2014 schedule ====
- EU London, UK – From 4 Jan to 16 Feb 2014
- EU Brussels, BE - From 27 Feb to 2 Mar 2014
- EU Toulouse, FR - From 5 Mar to 9 Mar 2014
- EU Strasbourg, FR - From 12 Mar to 16 Mar 2014
- EU Toulon, FR - From 19 Mar to 23 Mar 2014
- EU Montpellier, FR - From 26 Mar to 30 Mar 2014
- EU Lyon, FR - From 2 Apr to 6 Apr 2014
- EU Rouen, FR - From 30 Apr to 4 May 2014
- EU Berlin, DE - From 8 May to 11 May 2014
- EU Nuremberg, DE - From 14 May to 18 May 2014
- EU Hanover, DE - From 21 May to 25 May 2014
- EU Bremen, DE - From 28 May to 1 Jun 2014
- EU Hamburg, DE - From 4 Jun to 8 Jun 2014
- EU Luxembourg, LU - From 11 Jun to 15 Jun 2014
- AP Tel Aviv, IL - From 6 Aug to 21 Aug 2014 (Postponed to 2015)
- EU Athens, GR - From 20 Sep to 28 Sep 2014
- EU Thessaloniki, GR - From 30 Sep to 5 Oct 2014
- EU Zurich, CH - From 16 Oct to 19 Oct 2014
- EU Rome, IT - From 22 Oct to 26 Oct 2014
- EU Bologna, IT - From 29 Oct to 2 Nov 2014
- EU Florence, IT - From 5 Nov to 9 Nov 2014
- EU Pesaro, IT - From 12 Nov to 16 Nov 2014
- EU Milan, IT - From 19 No to 23 Nov 2014
- EU Turin, IT - From 26 Nov to 30 Nov 2014
- EU Paris, FR - From 3 Dec to 7 Dec 2014
- EU Lille, FR - From 10 Dec to 14 Dec 2014
- EU Lisbon, PT - From 18 Dec to 28 Dec 2014

==== 2015 schedule ====
- EU Santa Cruz de Tenerife, ES - From 2 Jan to 11 Jan 2015
- EU Bucharest, RO - From 29 Jan to 1 Feb 2015
- EU Bratislava, SK - From 5 Feb to 8 Feb 2015
- EU Budapest, HU - From 13 Feb to 15 Feb 2015
- EU Copenhagen, DK - From 18 Feb to 22 Feb 2015
- EU Rotterdam, NL - From 27 Feb to 1 Mar 2015
- EU Oslo, NO - From 5 Mar to 7 Mar 2015
- EU Helsinki, FI - From 11 Mar to 15 Mar 2015
- EU Vilnius, LT - From 19 Mar to 22 Mar 2015
- EU Minsk, BY - From 26 Mar to 29 Mar 2015
- EU Moscow, RU - From 16 Apr to 26 Apr 2015
- EU St. Petersburg, RU - From 29 Apr to 4 May 2015
- EU Linkoping, SE - From 8 May to 10 May 2015
- EU Gothenburg, SE - From 13 May to 16 May 2015
- EU Turku, FI - From 22 May to 25 May 2015
- EU Tallinn, EE - From 27 May to 30 May 2015
- EU Stockholm, SW - From 3 Jun to 6 Jun 2015
- EU Kraków, PL - From 12 Jun to 14 June 2015
- EU Gdansk, PL - From 18 Jun to 21 Jun 2015
- AP Tel Aviv, IL - From 2 Jul to 16 Jul 2015
- AP Bangkok, TH - From 29 Jul to 3 Aug 2015

(Quidam played under the Grand Chapiteau in Seoul, SK during this time)

- OC Canberra, AU - From 10 Dec to 20 Dec 2015
- OC Wollongong, AU - From 23 Dec 2015 to 2 Jan 2016

==== 2016 schedule ====
- OC Hobart, AU - From 6 Jan to 10 Jan 2016
- OC Newcastle, AU - From 15 Jan to 24 Jan 2016
- OC Auckland, NZ - From 5 Feb to 14 Feb 2016
- OC Christchurch, NZ - From 17 Feb to 26 Feb 2016 (final show)

=== Grand Chapiteau tour ===
1996-2010, 2015

==== 1996 schedule ====
- NA Montréal, QC – From 23 Apr to 23 Jun 1996 (show première)
- NA Ste-Foy, QC – From 4 Jul to 28 Jul 1996
- NA Toronto, ON – From 8 Aug to 8 Sept 1996
- NA Santa Monica, CA – From 25 Sep to 21 Dec 1996

==== 1997 schedule ====
- NA Costa Mesa, CA – From 29 Jan to 23 Mar 1997
- NA Santa Monica, CA – From 16 Apr to 20 May 1997
- NA Oakland, CA – From 29 May to 22 Jul 1997
- NA San Jose, CA – From 31 Jul to 16 Sept 1997
- NA Denver, CO – From 22 Sep to 11 Nov 1997
- NA Houston, TX – From 20 Nov to 30 Dec 1997

==== 1998 schedule ====
- NA Dallas, TX – From 11 Feb to 22 Mar 1998
- NA New York, NY – From 8 Apr to 5 Jul 1998
- NA Chicago, IL – From 22 Jul to 6 Sept 1998
- NA Washington, DC – From 17 Sep to 18 Oct 1998
- NA Atlanta, GA – From 29 Oct to 27 Dec 1998

==== 1999 schedule ====
- EU Amsterdam, NL – From 4 Mar to 6 June 1999
- EU Berlin, DE – From 18 Jun to 1 Aug 1999
- EU Vienna, AT – From 13 Aug to 17 Oct 1999
- EU Madrid, ES – From 3 Nov to 9 Jan 2000

==== 2000 schedule ====
- EU Barcelona, ES – From 15 Jan to 19 Mar 2000
- EU Bilbao, ES – From 30 Mar to 7 May 2000
- EU Valencia, ES – From 18 May to 25 Jun 2000
- EU Rotterdam, NL – From 7 Jul to 20 Aug 2000
- EU Düsseldorf, DE – From 31 Aug to 15 Oct 2000
- EU Frankfurt, DE – From 26 Oct to 3 Dec 2000
- EU London, UK – From 15 Dec 2000 to 4 Feb 2001

==== 2001 schedule ====
- EU Manchester, UK – From 16 Feb to 25 Mar 2001
- EU Antwerp, BE – From 5 Apr to 20 May 2001
- EU Hamburg, DE – From 31 May to 8 Jul 2001
- EU Copenhagen, DK – From 26 Jul to 2 Sept 2001
- EU Zurich, CH – From 9 Oct to 11 Nov 2001
- EU London, UK – From 22 Nov 2001 to 6 Jan 2002

==== 2002 schedule ====
- NA Miami, FL – From 7 Feb to 17 Mar 2002
- NA Charlotte, NC – From 29 Mar to 14 Apr 2002
- NA Pittsburgh, PA – From 9 May to 26 May 2002
- NA Detroit, MI – From 20 Jun to 14 Jul 2002
- NA Boston, MA – From 25 Jul to 15 Sep 2002
- NA Cleveland, OH – From 26 Sep to 13 Oct 2002
- NA St. Petersburg, FL – From 7 Nov to 8 Dec 2002

==== 2003 schedule ====
- AP Tokyo, JP – From 7 Feb to 5 May 2003
- AP Nagoya, JP – From 31 May to 6 Jul 2003
- AP Osaka, JP – From 19 Jul to 30 Sep 2003
- AP Fukuoka, JP – From 22 Oct to 7 Dec 2003
- AP Tokyo, JP – From 24 Dec 2003 to 4 Apr 2004

==== 2004 schedule ====
- NA Vancouver, BC – From 6 May to 13 Jun 2004
- NA Calgary, AB – From 24 Jun to 31 Jul 2004
- OC Sydney, AU – From 12 Aug to 24 Oct 2004
- OC Brisbane, AU – From 4 Nov to 12 Dec 2004
- OC Auckland, NZ – From 31 Dec 2004 to 12 Feb 2005

==== 2005 schedule ====
- OC Melbourne, AU – From 4 Mar to 1 May 2005
- OC Adelaide, AU – From 12 May to 12 Jun 2005
- OC Perth, AU – From 30 Jun to 31 Jul 2005
- AP Singapore, SG – From 9 Sep to 15 Oct 2005
- AP Hong Kong, HK – From 3 Nov to 16 Dec 2005

==== 2006 schedule ====
- NA San Diego, CA – From 19 Jan to 26 Feb 2006
- NA Long Beach, CA – From 9 Mar to 16 Apr 2006
- NA Ottawa, ON – From 18 May to 25 Jun 2006
- NA Philadelphia, PA – From 6 Jul to 13 Aug 2006
- NA Cincinnati, OH – From 24 Aug to 17 Sep 2006
- NA St. Louis, MO – From 28 Sep to 22 Oct 2006

==== 2007 schedule ====
- AP Dubai, AE – From 4 Jan to 18 Feb 2007
- AP Seoul, KR – From 20 Mar to 3 Jun 2007
- AP Shanghai, CN – From 28 Jun to 26 Aug 2007
- NA Guadalajara, MX – From 11 Oct to 4 Nov 2007
- NA Mexico City, MX – From 15 Nov 2007 to 13 Jan 2008

==== 2008 schedule ====
- NA Monterrey, MX – From 24 Jan to 10 Feb 2008
- NA Veracruz, MX – From 27 Feb to 16 Mar 2008
- EU Lisbon, PT – From 17 Apr to 25 May 2008
- EU Málaga, ES – From 5 Jun to 13 Jul 2008
- EU Alicante, ES – From 24 Jul to 31 Aug 2008
- EU Barcelona, ES – From 11 Sep to 19 Oct 2008
- EU Brussels, BE – From 30 Oct to 21 Dec 2008

==== 2009 schedule ====
(Quidam switched to an Arena format for the remainder of its European Tour)

- SA Fortaleza, BR – From 4 Jun to 21 Jun 2009
- SA Recife, BR – From 9 Jul to 2 Aug 2009
- SA Salvador, BR – From 13 Aug to 31 Aug 2009
- SA Brasília, BR – From 18 Sep to 11 Oct 2009
- SA Belo Horizonte, BR – From 23 Oct to 15 Nov 2009
- SA Curitiba, BR – From 27 Nov to 20 Dec 2009

==== 2010 schedule ====
- SA Rio de Janeiro, BR – From 7 Jan to 7 Feb 2010
- SA São Paulo, BR – From 19 Feb to 11 Apr 2010
- SA Porto Alegre, BR – From 23 Apr to 16 May 2010
- SA Buenos Aires, AR – From 28 May to 27 Jun 2010
- SA Santiago, CL – From 11 Jul to 15 Aug 2010
- SA Lima, PE – From 3 Sep to 27 Sep 2010
- SA Bogota, CO – From 19 Oct to 21 Nov 2010

==== 2015 schedule ====
AP Seoul, SK - From 10 Sep to 8 Nov 2015

== See also ==
- Solstrom
