= Erik Karol =

French singer author & composer (born 1963)

Érik Karol (born 15 March 1963) is a French singer author & composer.

He received the Charles Cros Academy Award and another as the Best Single of the Year at the Festival International d'Expression Française in Bordeaux for his single Partir en 1988.

Karol joined the French-Canadian Company Cirque du Soleil in 1999 and was the original singer and main character for their show, Dralion.

== Recordings ==
- Partir/Viens avec moi 7" & 12"(1987)
- Victoria/Lira 7" & 12"(1989)
- Le Cabaret des Eléments "Chant d'Ether" (1998)
- Cirque du Soleil "Dralion" (1999) BMG Music Canada
- Salto Natale "Chamäleon" (2002)
- Erik Karol "Polyphonic Trees" (2010)
- Erik Karol "Harda Vidya" (2011)

== Books ==
- Anneaux Marines (Editions Caractères- 1994)

== Movies soundtracks ==
- Hemingway, a portrait (Eric Canuel-Montréal-1999)
- Nuit Blanche (Daniel Colas-Paris-2007)
