= Luc Lafortune =

Canadian lighting designer

- Born: September 1958 (age 67); Montreal, Quebec, Canada
- Known for: Lighting design
- Website: luclafortune.com

Luc Lafortune (born September 1958) is a Canadian lighting designer for the entertainment industry as well as one of the original designers of the Cirque du Soleil.

== Career ==
La Nouba in Orlando, Florida

Lafortune studied at Dawson College, and then McGill University, where he obtained a bachelor's degree in Arts. He later obtained a bachelor's degree in Fine Arts from Concordia University.

Upon graduation, he went to work for Cirque du Soleil, embarking on their first tour, Le Grand Tour, a 13-week stint across rural Quebec, organized in conjunction with the celebrations marking the 450th anniversary of the discovery of Canada by French explorer, Jacques Cartier. Since then, Lafortune has designed numerous Cirque du Soleil shows, including Le Cirque Réinventé (We Reinvent the Circus), Fascination, Nouvelle Expérience, Saltimbanco, Mystère, Alegría, Quidam, O, La Nouba, Dralion, Varekai (co-designer), Zumanity and Kà.

In 2010, Lafortune completed the lighting design for the Franco Dragone production The House of Dancing Water at the City of Dreams, in Macau. In 2011, he designed the lighting for Turkmenistan's Twentieth Anniversary of Independence Gala, in collaboration with Filmmaster Events in Ashgabat.

== Awards ==
Quidam

- 2013 Recipient of a Les Etoiles du Siel Award
- 2012 ThEA Themed Entertainment Association Award in the "Live Show" Category, for The House of Dancing Water, Macau
- 2005 USITT United States Institute of Theatre Technology Distinguished Lighting Designer Award
- 1999 THEA Themed Entertainment Association Award in the "Live Show" Category, for O
- 1998 EDDY Entertainment Design Award, Show of the Year, for O
- 1997 Lighting Dimensions International Light Show of the Year Award, for Martin's Atomic Lounge
- 1994 Lighting Dimensions International Lighting Designer of the Year
- 1992 Drama-Logue Critics Award in Lighting, for Saltimbanco

In 2004, he registered at #34 on Live Design's list of the entertainment's industry's most powerful people.
