= Cameron Pace Group =

American 3D technology and production company

Cameron Pace Group is a 3D technology and production company based in Burbank, California. The company designs and manufactures camera equipment and software for 3D films.

== History ==
Cameron Pace Group (CPG) was founded in 2011 by director James Cameron and cinematographer Vince Pace, ASC. Prior to the collaboration with Cameron and subsequent rebranding, the company was known as PACE.

Cameron and Pace announced the formation of the new company at the 2011 National Association of Broadcasters (NAB) show in Las Vegas.

The stated goal of the company was to increase the quality of 3D production for film, television, and advertising, while also lowering costs and simplifying the use of 3D technology by allowing filmmakers and broadcasters to shoot 3D and conventional 2D simultaneously. Cameron and Pace had collaborated together previously on several projects, including Titanic, Ghosts of the Abyss and Avatar. In this period, Pace, Cameron and Patrick Campbell (CPG's chief technology officer) developed the patented Fusion Camera System to allow for more precise control over the left and right “eyes” of two cameras mounted together for stereoscopic filming. Pace contends that the technology better “emulates the way human eyes perceive depth.”

As of April, 2013, CPG (and PACE) had been involved in the production of 31 feature films and documentaries, and more than 300 television broadcasts. Its 3D technology was used on Avatar, Life of Pi and Hugo. All three films, which were shot in native 3D rather than being converted to 3D in post-production, have won the Academy Award for cinematography. CPG was also involved in the 3D production of Tron: Legacy, Resident Evil: Afterlife and U2 3D. As of April, 2013, CPG-supported films had earned more than $8.5 billion at the global box office.

As of April 2013, CPG held 11 patents for its equipment, including one for its Shadow Vision™ technology that stacks a 3D camera system next to or above a traditional broadcast 2D camera system and allows one camera operator to control and drive both cameras with one set of controls, capturing 2D and 3D images simultaneously. The company holds another patent for a device to control the intraocular distance and the convergence angle between camera lenses.

In 2011, CPG introduced a certification program for films deemed to have completed procedures required for quality stereoscopic film production. Specifically, the certification program seeks to provide a guidepost (akin to Dolby's certification program) to filmgoers to ensure a positive viewing experience, free of the headaches or discomfort caused by subpar 3D production. Avatar, Martin Scorsese's Hugo and Walking with Dinosaurs have received CPG certification.

In August, 2012 CPG launched Cameron Pace Group China in the port city of Tianjin. While numbers for 3D box office are stagnant in the United States, the interest in 3D in China is growing, driven in part by the success of the re-release of James Cameron's Titanic and Ang Lee's Life of Pi. CPG hopes to replicate its stateside success by marketing technology and expertise to Chinese filmmakers and broadcasters who have had less experience with 3D production.

At the 2013 NAB show in Las Vegas, CPG announced a collaboration with Dolby Laboratories and Royal Philips Electronics on the development of autostereoscopic (glasses-free) 3D television. According to Variety, “under the agreement, CPG will integrate Dolby 3D — Dolby’s suite of autostereo TV technologies — into its future content and collaborate on its use.”

In 2014, entertainment technology provider VER acquired Pace as a part of their efforts to service the film industry.

== Awards ==
On May 7, 2013, CPG was part of the broadcast team that won a Sports Emmy Award in the "Team Technical Remote" category, for ESPN's 3D's coverage of the 2012 Winter X Games 16. CPG won the George Wensel Technical Achievement Award, along with C.B.S., for outstanding 3D broadcasts at the 32nd Annual Sports Emmy Award for their coverage of the 2010 U.S. Open Tennis Championships. It also won a Sports Emmy along with ESPN 3D in the Team Technical Remote category for coverage of Winter X Games Fifteen.

== Feature films ==
- Walking with Dinosaurs 3D (2013)
- 47 Ronin (2013)
- Land of the Bears (2013)
- Life of Pi (2012)
- Cirque du Soleil: Worlds Away (2012)
- Journey 2: The Mysterious Island (2012)
- Hugo (2011)
- The Three Musketeers (2011)
- Shark Night 3D (2011)
- Glee: The 3D Concert Movie (documentary) (2011)
- Final Destination 5 (2011)
- Transformers: Dark of the Moon (2011)
- Pirates of the Caribbean: On Stranger Tides (2011)
- Justin Bieber: Never Say Never (documentary) (2011)
- Sanctum (2011)
- Yogi Bear (2010)
- TRON: Legacy (2010)
- Resident Evil: Afterlife (2010)
- Step Up 3D (2010)
- Avatar (2009)
- Gamer (2009)
- The Final Destination (2009)
- Public Enemies (2009)
- Jonas Brothers: The 3D Concert Experience (documentary) (2009)
- Journey to the Center of the Earth (2008)
- Speed Racer (2008)
- Wild Ocean (documentary) (2008)
- Hannah Montana & Miley Cyrus: Best of Both Worlds Concert (documentary) (2008)
- U2 3D (documentary) (2007)
- Crank (2006)
- The Adventures of Sharkboy and Lavagirl in 3-D (2005)
- Aliens of the Deep (documentary) (2005)
- Spy Kids 3-D: Game Over (2003)
- Ghosts of the Abyss (documentary short) (2003)
