= O (Cirque du Soleil) =

Water-themed stage production

Coordinates: 36°06′47″N 115°10′35″W

- Logo for Cirque du Soleil's O
- Company: Cirque du Soleil
- Genre: Contemporary circus
- Show type: Resident showing
- Date of premiere: October 17, 1998
- Location: Bellagio, Las Vegas

Creative team
- Writer and director: Franco Dragone
- Director of creation: Gilles Ste-Croix
- Set designer: Michel Crête
- Composer: Benoit Jutras
- Costume designer: Dominique Lemieux
- Lighting designer: Luc Lafortune
- Choreographer: Debra Brown
- Sound designers: François Bergeron; Jonathan Deans
- Artistic swimming designer: Sylvie Fréchette
- Aerial acrobatics designer: André Simard
- Rigging designer: Jaque Paquin
- Make-up designer: Nathalie Gagné

Other information
- Preceded by: Quidam (1996)
- Succeeded by: La Nouba (1998)
- Official website

O is a water-themed stage production by Cirque du Soleil, a Canadian circus and entertainment company. The show has been in permanent residence at the Bellagio in Las Vegas, Nevada, United States, since October 1998. O, whose name is pronounced the same way as eau, the French word for "water", takes place around and above a 1.5-million-US-gallon (5,700 m^{3}) pool of water. It features water acts such as synchronized swimming as well as aerial and ground acts. The O theatre, which is designed to resemble a 14th-century European opera house, has 1,800 seats, thus allowing the performance to be watched by 3,600 people a night since the performance usually plays twice in a given day. The theatre was also designed to meet the special demands of the show.

O was inspired by the "infinity and elegance of water's pure form," which pays tribute to the beauty of the theatre. A group of 150 stage technicians assists in the production of the show, the cast of which is 85 performers: international acrobats, synchronized swimmers, and divers. Some of them are former Olympic athletes.

== History ==
Since late October 2010, Cirque du Soleil has offered backstage tours of the O theatre. The experience allows visitors to see the backstage wings, training rooms, costume workshop, break area, underwater lighting area, and go up to a catwalk into the sound and lighting booths. Not every experience will be the same as the tour is conducted around a "regular day", so performers may or may not be training, rehearsing, or even working out.

As of early 2011, O has grossed over $1 billion since the show opened in 1998.

O has received many awards, including the following:

- Entertainment Design Award, best production show, 1998
- Las Vegas Review-Journal, best production show, 1999–2006
- THEA, live show category, 1999
- Prix Italia, creativity in high definition, 2009, for the documentary Flow

O had its 10,000th performance on 1 September 2019.

== Set and technical information ==
The show has a cast of 77 acrobats, synchronized swimmers and divers performing in and above a 1.5 million-gallon pool. When maintenance needs to be performed, the pool is drained in about 12 hours to the Bellagio Lake, causing the lake's water level to rise 1 inch (25 mm). The pool is kept at 88 °F (31 °C) and has an underwater speaker system and regulators that allow performers to breathe underwater. Every member of the cast is scuba-certified.

The underwater stage lift was produced by Handling Specialty. In order for the platform stage to rise and fall in the water without a wake, the rubber surface of the stage is perforated.

Cold air vents under each seat help control the theatre temperature for the audience. The goal is to maintain two temperature zones in the theatre: the stage is kept at a higher temperature of 84 °F (29 °C), while the audience area is kept at a lower temperature of 72 °F (22 °C). A mesh false ceiling allows warm moist air to escape out of the top of the theatre.

To minimize damage to the musical instruments, the musicians play from glass enclosures in the theatre. Some of the musical instruments used in the show are more than 100 years old. The unique string instrument heard in the soundtrack of O is an erhu, a traditional Chinese bowed string instrument.

To maintain a fresh look on the performers, some performers have multiple sets of costumes so they may reappear dry despite having been in the water. Some of the costumes only have a lifespan of approximately 20 shows due to the bromide and chlorine in the water.

Additional facts about the show:

- Some of the props function as boats, like the umbrella that Le Vieux rides on the water.
- There are 15 technicians underwater during the show, performing various tasks such as artist handling and props manipulation.
- The horses that the Comets ride in the show weigh 900 pounds (410 kg).
- The clown house weighs over 7,000 pounds (3,200 kg).
- Hanging 49 feet above the stage, the carousel and téléphérique (a conveyor system) carry tons of equipment as well as performers during the show.
- Most of the props that are used during the show are actually driven by the performers who ride them. For instance, the carousel horses have a small propeller underneath their tails; they are controlled by a joystick located on the back of the horse.

== Characters ==
The cast of O includes many unique and surreal characters.

- Guifà (Philemon): A young Sicilian boy whose curiosity and quest for adventure transport him into the magical realm of O.
- Eugen (Le Vieux): The guide and the guardian of the theatre. As his character journeys from dark to white, he embodies the cyclical aspects of life where everything old becomes new again.
- Le Travesti (The Transvestite): He is a dancer wearing the clothes of a wicked woman; his cries resound throughout the theater.
- Comets: Clad in red jackets and white hair, the Comets soar through the air on silks. They also accompany the principal characters as they make their entrances and exits and provide assistance during some acts.
- Le Voleur Masqué (The Masked Thief): He is a masked character with many faces who plays with fire.
- L'Allume (Man on Fire): He is a pyromaniac who is seen completely set on fire.
- Les Zèbres: The zebras add a touch of playfulness throughout the show and perform in the Cadre act. The youngest of the flock is called The Little Zebra.
- Le Joueur d'Orgue de Barbarie (The Organ Grinder): A gentle giant, always ready to be helpful.
- Aurora: An artist who has captured the interest of Giufà. He catches sight of her in the prologue, pursues her whenever he sees her, and finds her again in the epilogue.
- La Petite Danseuse: A dancer following the song of the barrel organ.
- Le Waiter: Rubber man and dancer.
- The Mermaids: The watchers of the mystical waters. Represents the malevolent side of the water.
- The Dryads: Beautiful and kind creatures, always smiling while they swim.
- The Sirens: The watchers from the depths of the waters. Represents the beneficent side of the water.
- Les Mariés: Lost and abandoned, the bride is searching for something – a key to her existence. The males characters of this group are called Groom.
- Les Nus: They are the living memory of all stories told in the theatre. They include Donkey, Moonhead, Grosse Femme, Skinned, The Lover, The Ballerina, Elizabethan, Nucleaire, Blind Man, The Dirty Old Man, Napoleon, The Funeral Bird (Nightmare), and Chicken.
- The Clowns: With simple, poetic gestures they convey the many complexities of life.
  - Dimitri "Dima" Bogatirev and Iryna Ivanytska. (1998-2001)
  - Leonid Leykin and Valery Keft. (2001-2015)
  - Joe De Paul and Voki Kalfayan. (2002-2004)
  - Onofrio Colucci and Bodya Hart. (2004-2007)
  - Terry Bartlett and Valery Slemzin. (2013-2024)
  - Jon Monastero and Stephen Simon. (2024-present)

== Costumes ==
Costumes for O drew inspiration from many sources: commedia dell'arte, the Baroque, India, the Arabian Nights, as well as Venetian courtly fashions. The costumes' silhouettes are defined by the design and are accentuated by the transparency of the selected materials and fabrics. Many costumes' base design are leotards which are then expounded upon: this includes the Zebras and Flayed Ones, among others. The Flayed Ones' leotards, for example, originally had hand-painted muscles on them, as digital screen-printing was inaccessible at the time of creation. Another special attribute critical to costumes in O is their treatment to help withstand the water and chemicals in it. To achieve this feat, roughly 40% of the costumes have been applied with a specific type of silicon sizing. In addition, the materials chosen are more durable and had to be able to both mould to the performer's body and dry quickly. Over the years the best fabric found for the costumes has been nylon mesh, which performs well either wet or dry.

Additional facts regarding the costumes:

- A separate room was built with timed heaters and fans to air-dry many of the costumes which cannot be tumble-dried.
- Sixty loads of laundry are done nightly to wash the costumes which can be machine washed.
- The swimmers' costumes are replaced every 3 months.
- The Comets' costumes last for a full year.
- All wigs and headpieces had to have chinstraps added.

== Music ==
The music of O was composed by Benoit Jutras and features a mix of classical Western and world instrumentation, including Chinese violin (erhu), bagpipes, African guitar and harp (kora), Colombian guitar, cello, ancient woodwinds and a wide variety of percussion instruments. During the show, the score is performed by a live band situated behind glass walls above and to the side of the stage. The glass protects the musicians' equipment from moisture damage.

O's music was recorded at the Bellagio and released on November 24, 1998. (ASIN B00000FDJZ) The album was re-released on September 6, 2005. (ASIN B000A2H9WU) The songs are listed below with their corresponding act in parentheses.

Album track list (and acts in the show accompanied by each song):

1. Jeux d'Eau (Solo and duo trapeze)
2. Mer Noire (Barge)
3. Tzelma (Interlude from bateau)
4. Africa (Interlude from clown act 1)
5. Remous (Bateau)
6. Svecounia (Interlude from contortion, cerceaux)
7. Nostalgie (Intro to russian swings)
8. Simcha (Character parade, Russian swings)
9. Gamelan (Contortion)
10. Ephra (Flying man and cadre)
11. Désert (Opening, nage, solo and duo trapeze)
12. Terre Aride (Fire)
13. O (Finale)

Additional songs in the show not included on the album:

- Danse (Clown act 2) (2001-present)
- Debbie (Journey of Man) (Washington/solo trapeze)
- Festival (Interlude from Fire)
- Sur Terre (Clown act 2) (1998-2001)
- Plouf (High dive)
- La Glace (Clown act 1) (1998-2001)
- Reda Ver.1 (Opening) (1998-2000)
- Reda Ver.2 (Opening) (2001-present)
- Confluence (Interlude from Cerceaux)
- Merou (Washington trapeze) (1998 only)
- Nenuphar (Intro to contortion)
- Berceuse/Robinet (Clown act 1) (2001–present)
- Humoresque No. 7 Opus 101 (Opening Interlude) (1998-2000)
- Aurora (Opening Interlude) (2001–present)

== Filmography ==
In 2007, Cirque du Soleil released the film Flow (A Tribute to the Artists of "O"). The documentary was filmed in the O theatre and by the Colorado River. The film shows certain artists performing out around the river as well as on stage and provides information on the necessary technical equipment used to produce the performance. Bonus features of Flow include: performance clips, Russian swing act, technical information and film below the surface of the O pool, and information about the creation of O itself.

In 2009, Flow won the Prix Italia award for the category of Creativity in High Definition.

The following acts were used in Cirque du Soleil: Worlds Away:

- Synchronised swimming
- Bateau
- Fire
- Duo trapeze
- Contortion
- Aerial hoops

In 2024, the film documentary Cirque du Soleil: Without a Net was released on streaming media. The film shares the behind the scenes story of the professional and personal lives of the cast and crew returning to the COVID-19 pandemic closed show.
