= La Nouba =

Cirque du Soleil show

Coordinates: 28.371°N 81.523°W

- Logo for Cirque du Soleil's La Nouba
- Company: Cirque du Soleil
- Genre: Contemporary circus
- Show type: Resident show
- Date of premiere: December 23, 1998
- Final show: December 31, 2017
- Location: Disney Springs, Lake Buena Vista, Florida

Creative team
- Director: Franco Dragone
- Creation director: Gilles Ste-Croix
- Composer and musical director: Benoît Jutras
- Costume designer: Dominique Lemieux
- Set designer: Michel Crête
- Choreographer: Debra Brown
- Lighting designer: Luc Lafortune
- Sound co-designers: Jonathan Deans, François Bergeron
- Artistic guide: Guy Laliberté
- Make-up designer: Nathalie Gagné

Other information
- Preceded by: O (1998)
- Succeeded by: Dralion (1999); Drawn to Life (2021)
- Official website

La Nouba was a Contemporary Circus made by the Canadian entertainment company Cirque du Soleil. The show ran for 19 years in a custom-built, freestanding theater at Disney Springs' West Side at the Walt Disney World Resort in Lake Buena Vista, Florida. The performance featured acrobats, gymnasts, and other skilled performers. The show's creation was directed by Franco Dragone, who also directed many of Cirque du Soleil's earlier shows. Its title derives from the French phrase faire la nouba, meaning "to party" or "to live it up".

The show was succeeded by Drawn to Life, which premiered on November 18, 2021.

== History ==
On December 23, 1998, the entertainment company Cirque du Soleil premiered a contemporary circus production, La Nouba, in a new theater custom-designed and built for Cirque du Soleil in Downtown Disney (later renamed Disney Springs) at the Walt Disney World Resort. With an international cast of 67 artists, the show welcomed more than 1,650 spectators ten times a week. The show was Cirque du Soleil's third resident (non-touring) show created after Mystère and O in Las Vegas.

In 2007, 12 members of the power track act performed a routine during the pre-game show of Super Bowl XLI.

La Nouba reached a major milestone on July 10, 2009, during its 9 pm showing—this was their 5000th performance. On August 13, 2011, during the 6 pm showing, the show celebrated its 6000th performance. The show's 7000th performance was celebrated on September 12, 2013, at the 6 pm showing. La Nouba celebrated its 15th anniversary on December 18, 2013, with a special appearance from Mickey Mouse and Minnie Mouse. This was the first time any Disney characters had appeared in the show.

La Nouba ended its 19-year run on December 31, 2017, to be replaced by a new Cirque du Soleil show. The show, Drawn to Life, premiered on 18 November 2021.

== Set and technical information ==
The theater housing La Nouba was the first freestanding permanent structure built for Cirque du Soleil. The theater was designed by Michel Crête, Michel Aubé of Scéno Plus, Walt Disney Imagineering, and the architects of the Rockwell Group of New York. It could seat a total of 1,671 people per show. The building incorporated elements of fabric and tension reminiscent of the form of a circus tent.

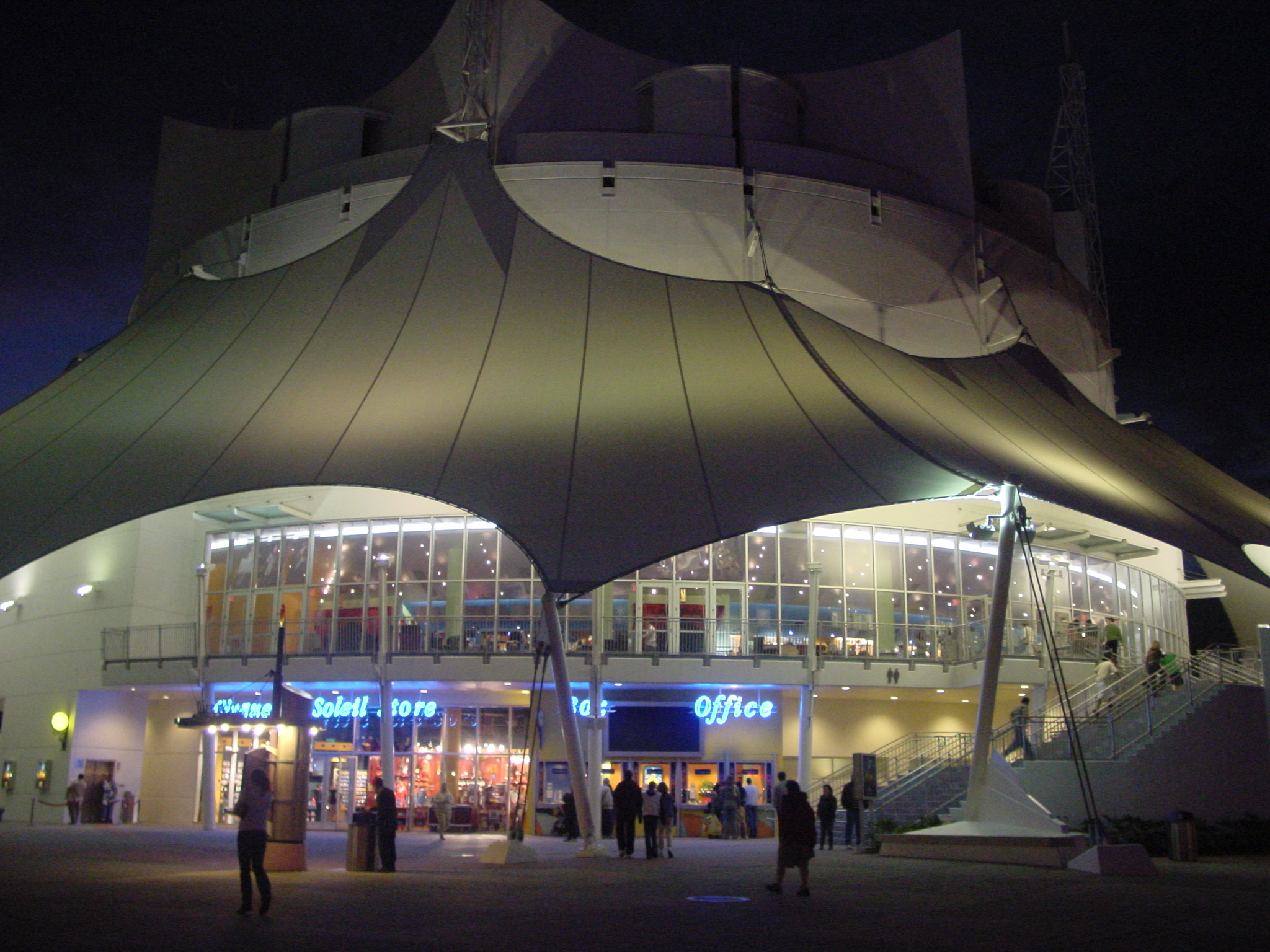
The home of La Nouba at Disney Springs

The backdrop of the stage was a trellis measuring 60 by 200 feet (18 m × 61 m) and made of PVC panels and scrim. The stage floor itself had five elevator lifts, each with a 3,000 pounds (1,400 kg) load capacity. These lifts could move at a rate of 1 foot per second (0.30 m/s) and rise to a maximum height of 16 feet (4.9 m). The center stage lift, in addition to elevating, could also descend 16 feet (4.9 m) below the stage on a second axis. Other movable set elements included the two téléphériques installed along the back wall which could transport acrobatic equipment, props, and scenery at a pace of 4 feet per second (1.2 m/s).

Four retractable power track floors were housed in the stage. Each floor weighed over 10,000 pounds (4,500 kg) and could move up to 2 feet per second (0.61 m/s). The trampoline bed was tighter and used the second generation of springs, allowing the performers to jump higher and faster down the track, which measured 60 feet (18 m) in length. The trampolines consisted of two overlapping tracks, as seen in Alegría. The entire stage deck was layered with impact-resilient Mondo Sport Floor over wood in order to avoid injury.

The theater's immense height (ground level to fly height was 100 feet (30 m); ground level to top of the masts was 152 feet (46 m)) allowed the scenic and acrobatic equipment to be stored in the ceiling. As another first for Cirque du Soleil, the trapeze net was installed mechanically during the show with no visible stagehands as it was lowered into place from the ceiling.

== Characters ==
In La Nouba there were two main character categories: the Cirques, or circus people, sporting bright, fluorescent colors; and the Urbains, or urbanites, who wore dark, muted colors or monochromatic costumes. As in every Cirque du Soleil show, in addition to the performances, there were several distinctive characters that participated in the show, sometimes as performers and sometimes as spectators. In La Nouba, these included:

- L'Oiseau (The Green Bird): Out of her cage, this bird wants to fly, and is very marionettesque in her actions.
- Les Cons (The Nuts): Dressed in all-white, these mischievous characters are the ever-present fools of the show.
- Le Titan (The Titan): The show's resident "strong man" who confronts everyone on stage while contorting his body in unusual poses.
- Le Promeneur (The Walker): Dressed in grey pinstripes with a small bowler hat, he sees the world through happiness.
- Liama: A princess in the world of La Nouba who sings her joy and passion.
- The Peacock Singer: A ambiguous character, dangerous and protective at the same time. He lives in height, perched at the top of the mountain, on the wall at the End of the World, where he sings the tale of all the action he sees from the sky, like a bird.
- The Devil: Far away at the End of the World lives the Devil, who creates desire and fears into the hearth of lovers.
- The Pierrot Acrobat: Agile and nimble, he appears as a red acrobat. He is the adversary of the Titan until he joins him in mutual admiration at the end of the show. He is part of the Red Pierrot family, themselves part of a larger group of individuals known as Les Cirques. He appears up on the mountain, on the wall at the End of the World, on the Rocks, at the heart of the action.
- Les Danseurs (The Dancers): The Romeo and Juliet of the show. One is a Lost Ballerina, who looking for a purpose to her existence. She will find love and join the Cirques. The second is the Pierrot Clown, a lost soul in the dark city, who will find a purpose and motivation to evolve through his love for the Lost Ballerina.
- Clowns:
  - Balto and Sergey (1998–2013): An unexpected clown duo directing people to their seats. Balthazar was originally created by Michel Deschamps in the 1970s and joined Cirque du Soleil's 1989-1990 American and European tours and Fascination in Japan in 1992. He also made occasional appearances in Alegría during its first European tour. Sergei Shashalev also previously appeared in the latter.
  - The Pablos (2014–2017): Former Alegría clowns who joined this show in 2014.
- The Prince: A noble prince transformed into a frog.
- The Rag Doll: A rag doll left in the attic that will fly away for a while with The Walker through the door of her imagination.
- The Jester: A Circus equilibrist performing during the birthday dinner scene.
- Virginia, the Cleaning Lady: Also referred to as "La Femme de Ménage", she is shocked to be in this world and astonished by what goes on around her. She sweeps and dusts nonetheless until her dream becomes a reality.
- The Automatons: Futuristic puppet-like creatures, originally part of the German Wheel and Skipping Rope act, no longer in the show.

== Acts ==
The show contained the following acts:

- Breakdancing: Josh Ortiz ("The Incredible Josh"), Jean Carlos Lloret ("Bebo"), and Dmytro Li ("Flying Buddha") performed routines that straddled the line between dance and acrobatics, with spins, flips and other tricks.
- Aerial bamboo: Alexander and Ekaterina Abramov did a variety of tricks while hanging from a pole-shaped apparatus suspended from the ceiling. This act originated in China using bamboo poles, hence its name.
- Diabolos: A children's toy with a circus twist, four young and very talented girls threw hourglass-shaped, giant yoyos in the air with help of a long line of string connected to two sticks that they held in each hand. The children flipped, rolled, and even skipped with the string while the spinning diabolo plummeted to the stage to be caught at the last second. Up to two diabolos were manipulated by each performer in this game of dexterity.
- Cycles: Included one BMX cyclist and a mountain biker performing tricks on bicycles.
- Aerial cradle: The aerial cradle looked like a door and was the setting for a demonstration of equal-opportunity strength and agility. This display featured elements of traditional circus aerial cradle but added a unique twist: the male and female artists took turns supporting one another, 34 feet (10 m) above the stage.
- Aerial ballet in silk: A solo male performer dangled above the stage using incredible strength to create multiple poses, while four female artists wrapped themselves in the long column of silk and then unwrapped themselves by spinning and flipping in this sky high ballet. This was the most dangerous act in La Nouba as it used no wires or support, only the artists' concentration.
- Rola bola: A colorful performer built a tower of cylinders and pipes, all the while balancing on a board on top of it all. As his tower grew higher and higher, so did the risk and excitement; the acrobat juggled while on top of the shaky tower.
- Flying trapeze: Four pendulum-like swings, on two different levels, carried a team of perfectly synchronized aerialists 53 feet (16 m) above the stage.
- Power track and trampoline: This high-energy spectacle had performers literally bouncing off the walls and through the windows and roof of a three-dimensional building. This seven-and-a-half minute act included athletes performing 394 flips and 62 twists.

=== Acts in rotation ===
- Cyr wheel: This act was a backup act for aerial bamboo and was not commonly performed in the show.

=== Retired acts ===
- Balancing on chairs: Featured a solo performer who hand-balanced on eight chairs stacked on a table. The chair stack rose 25 feet (7.6 m) in the air. The area below the chairs and table rose via a platform raising the performer a full 41 feet (12 m) above the stage. This act was originally created and performed by Vasily Demenchukov, who had previously performed a similar act in the Nouvelle Expérience. The act was then taken over by Rokardy Rodriguez in 2002, who kept performing until the entire act was replaced with Anthony Gatto's juggling act in 2010.
- German wheel: Featured two performers inside of large double-hoops, manipulated by shifting their center of gravity. The performers would roll around obstacles, fall over spinning until they were almost flat on the ground then stand back up, and perform tricks with both performers in one wheel. This act was replaced by the jump rope act in 2010.
- Juggling: Anthony Gatto juggled clubs, rings and balls. This act was replaced by the rola bola act in 2014.
- Jump rope: A rebooted version of the young children's game, two expert skipping soloists were the centre of attention in this speedy act. In 2015, this act made way for the B-boys.
- High wire: The entire act took place on a 90-foot (27 m)-long high wire. Wire walkers ascended to a height of 34 feet (10 m) above the stage, supported by a half-inch steel wire. This act was replaced by the aerial bamboo act in 2015.

== Costumes ==
Costume designer Dominique Lemieux created thirty different costume concepts and drew up at least ten different designs for each concept. Lemieux mixed historical and traditional circus ideas with contemporary fashions in her designs, and ten special technicians were employed in order to custom dye fabrics, real and synthetic hair, feathers, horsehair, and leather materials used on the various costumes. In the eight weeks, she was given to design the costumes (October 24 to December 23, 1998), she created two drastically different styles to separate the urban people from the circus people. The circus people donned bright, neon colors while the urbanites were represented by black, gray, and muted tones. Lemieux used natural, textured fabrics such as hemp to epitomize the urbanites.

Many of the performers underwent a metamorphosis indicated by often dramatic costume changes; for instance, the urbanites' outfits began in dark, muted blues, reds, and greens and ended in white, fairy-like outfits. In the German wheel costumes, Lemieux accented dark colors with fluorescent fabrics to provide a high contrast with the black lights used during this act. The performers were designed to appear as marionettes and to emphasize human anatomy. The costumes designed for the flying trapeze act were tribal and androgynous. They were elaborated with complex collars, head ornaments and tutu skirts for the males. Les Cons were inspired by the Pierrot, with simple, white outfits to depict their innocence.

For all Cirque du Soleil productions, plaster head molds were created to make certain that all wigs, masks, and headpieces fit perfectly. Four different wig designs were created for the show and each wig took one person approximately seventy hours to complete.

== Music ==
The music of La Nouba, composed by Benoît Jutras, was performed live by six musicians and two singers. A CD album of the music of La Nouba was originally released in 1999 and re-released in 2005. It features most of the music played during the show.

Below are the tracks in order as they appear on the CD. Listed after each track title is the act that was associated with the track.

1. Once Upon a Time
  - German wheel (1998-2010)
  - Jump rope (2010-2015)
  - Breakdancing (2015-2017)
2. A Tale (Aerial ballet in silk pt. 2)
3. Porte
  - Aerial cradle (1999-2017)
4. La Nouba (Parade, Curtain Call)
5. Distorted (Diabolo exit, BMX, Bows)
6. Liama
  - Aerial cradle (1998)
  - High wire (1998-2015)
  - Aerial bamboo (2015-2017)
7. Queens (Flying trapeze)
8. À la Lune
  - Balancing on Chairs (1998-2010)
  - Intro to Jongleur (2010-2013)
  - Rola Bola (2013-2017)
9. Rêve Rouge (Aerial ballet in silk pt. 1 and 3)
10. Urban (Power track, trampolines) (1999-2017)
11. Propel (Dance Interlude)
12. Jardin Chinois (Diabolos)

Additional songs in the show not included on the album:

- Vieux Grenier (Overture)
- Prelude to Liama (Transition to high wire act) (1998-2000)
- Prelude to Propel (Transition to clown act I)
- Les Astronautes (Clowns In Space) (1998-2013)
- Tout mêlé (Clown Chairs) (1998-2013)
- Château Perdu (Clown Window) (1998-2013)
- Cow-cus (Clown Cowboys) (1998-2013)
- Baby Buggy (Clown Carriage) (1998-2013)
- Pinata (Clown Pinata) (2014-2017)
- Thieves (Clowns Thieves) (2014-2017)
- Igor (High Wire) (1998)
- Building (Power track, trampolines, Bows) (1998)
- Cinq à Sept
  - Juggling (2010-2013)
  - Cyr Wheel (2017)
- Panic (Transition to Frog Dance)
- Virginia's Tango (Frog Dance)
- Prince (Transition to Curtain Call) (1999-2017)
