= Saulo Sarmiento =

Spanish acrobat and pole dancer

Saulo Sarmiento (born 13 August 1987) is a Spanish acrobat and pole dancer from the Canary Islands. He performed with Cirque du Soleil and has appeared on Britain's Got Talent and La France a un incroyable talent. He began gymnastics training at the age of 13.

Sarmiento speaks English, Spanish, and French. On fitness, Sarmiento reported to Queerty that he does not eat much before bed and mixes a cardio circuit with weights and yoga classes.
