= Dralion =

Former Cirque du Soleil production

- Logo for Cirque du Soleil's Dralion
- Company: Cirque du Soleil
- Genre: Contemporary circus
- Show type: Touring
- Date of premiere: April 22, 1999 (Montreal)
- Final show: January 18, 2015 (Anchorage)

Creative team
- Director: Guy Caron
- Director of creation: Gilles Ste-Croix
- Set designer: Stéphane Roy
- Composer: Violaine Corradi
- Costume designer: François Barbeau
- Clown act designer: Michel Dallaire
- Lighting designer: Luc Lafortune
- Choreographer: Julie Lachance
- Sound designer: Guy Desrochers
- General artistic director: Sylvie Galarneau
- Company founder and CEO: Guy Laliberté

Other information
- Preceded by: La Nouba (1998)
- Succeeded by: Varekai (2002)
- Official website

Dralion (pronounced Drah-lee-on) was a touring production by the Canadian entertainment company Cirque du Soleil. The show combined elements of traditional Chinese circus with Western contemporary circus, complementing the "East-meets-West" theme implied in the title—the name is a portmanteau of "dragon" (representing the East) and "lion" (representing the West). It is Cirque du Soleil's twelfth touring production and the first Cirque show since 1985 not to be directed by Franco Dragone. Dralion performed its final show at the Sullivan Arena in Anchorage, Alaska on January 18, 2015, bringing its fifteen-year world tour to a close.

== Set and technical information ==
The backdrop for Dralion was a metallic structure 60 feet (18 m) in width and 26 feet (7.9 m) in height. It was covered in perforated aluminum tiles, giving it the appearance of medieval armor or a futuristic Chinese temple. Sitting atop the structure were six giant claws which allow performers to climb the wall and suspend in mid-air. Above the stage itself were three large concentric aluminum rings. The first was utilized as a catwalk; the second was used to support acrobatic equipment; and the third is used by performers to move up and down and suspend in the air.

Portions of the Dralion stage were redesigned and incorporated into the Ovo arena tour in early 2016.

== Characters ==
Dralion featured 50 members in its performance troupe, of which about 5 or 6 play principal characters.

- Azala (air): The goddess of air who is dressed in blue, keeper of the sun and the guardian of immortality.
- Gaya (earth): The goddess of earth, dressed in ochre.
- Océane (water): The goddess of water, dressed in green.
- Yao (fire): The god of fire, dressed in red, who is both good and evil.
- L'Âme Force: The show's singers who symbolize harmony between the four elements.
- Kala: Represents the heart of the wheel of time, making time evolve.
- King Bamboo: Represents the force of Fire.
- Hibana: A Fire Princess.
- Little Buddha: The chosen child who possesses powers that will eventually allow him to become an Âme-Force, but dreams of being a regular child.
- Shine: The lover of the air goddess Azala.
- Dralions: Mythical creatures inspired by the imagery of the Chinese lion dance and dragon dance. (performed by members of Chinese house troupe)
- Water Nymphs: A group of young girls dress in green, they follow the order of Océane.
- Giovanni: A small but nimble man.
  - Joe De Paul (1999–2001, 2006)
  - Blas Villalpando (2001)
  - Philippe Aymard (2001–2008, 2009–2010)
  - Jose Cobrana (2008–2009)
  - Facundo Gimenez (2010–2015)
- Giovanna: A female version of Giovanni portrayed by Jessica Green. (2003)
- The Clowns: The original clowns of Dralion consisting of Robert Jetté, Ben Amar-Djalal, Aline Muheim, and Philippe Delaitre. (1999)
- Les Voila: A duo of bizarre clowns consisting of Johnny Filion and Soizick Hebert. (1999–2001)
- The Mad Italian Waiters: Two clowns consisting of the obese and pompous Vincenti, and the absent minded Alberti. (2001–2015)

== Acts ==
The acts of Dralion combine unique western and eastern acrobatic skills.

- Dance of the Elements: The show began with the goddesses and god of the four elements dancing.
- Single Handbalancing: A single woman balances on one hand and accomplishes a variety of poses.
- Bamboo Poles: Five acrobats twirl and throw 25-foot-long (7.6 m) bamboo poles while Yao waves a flag as the acrobats jump over it.
- Juggling: An artist performs juggling infused with breakdancing and modern dance. This act was performed by Viktor Kee but now is performed by Vladik Myagkostoupov.
- Trampoline: Surrounding Océane, a group of acrobats perform on trampolines using the set's futuristic backdrop both as a diving board and landing pad.
- Crossed Cyr Wheel: A cyr wheel that is infused with another cyr wheel forming a globe. The performer spins and twists this apparatus in an act that represents the circle of life and the passing of time.
- Dralions: Three acrobats and three Dralions perform tumbling feats and Chinese lion dance-like dance.
- Medusa: A group of artists execute graceful and lithe movements, in the style of acrosport.
- Aerial Hoop: A single artist performs choreography using a hoop suspended in mid-air.
- Diabolo: Artists perform tricks with diabolos trying to outperform each other.
- Aerial Pas de Deux: Azala and her male counterpart perform an aerial dance in silks.
- Hoop Diving: Acrobats jump through a tower of hoops, which is sometimes spinning.
- Skipping Ropes: A group of acrobats perform jump rope alone or together in pyramids and in towers.

=== Rotation acts ===
- Contortion: A solo act featuring a very flexible performer who stays in handstands with their legs over their head.
- Aerial Straps: Used commonly in place of Aerial Pas de Deux.

=== Retired acts ===
- Contortion with Bowls: This was a contortion act made even more precarious with the added difficulty of balancing a stack of bowls on the artists head.
- Teeterboard: An original Dralion act, it featured an all female troupe. The flyer would stand at one end of the trapeze as two performers jumped onto the opposite end, shooting the flyer up and onto a high tower of other performers.
- Ballet on Lightbulbs: An original Dralion act that was unlike anything else. A group of female artists wore ballet pointe shoes and balanced while other performers climbed onto their shoulders creating high towers of people all on a platform of light bulbs.
- Double Duplex Trapeze: An original Dralion act, two trapezes that had one bar at the bottom and another bar about a metre above it, the artists would jump or flip from the higher bar into the hands of another performer at the bottom bar.
- Foot Juggling: An original Dralion act, this foot juggling act featured a female artist who manipulated and spun an open Chinese parasol on her feet, at one moment she would have a parasol on each foot and each hand, all spinning simultaneously.
- Balancing on Chairs: This act had an artist stack a pile if chairs, at the top of the pile the artist performed a hand-balancing act.
- Spirits: Four couples perform a gravity-defying ballet.

== Costumes ==
Dralion's costumes are vibrant in color; inspired by clothing from India, China, and Africa; and are shaped according to the movements of each performer's choreography. In total there are around 1500 wardrobe pieces for the show, taking into account that some artists have up to four costume changes during a single performance.

- Yao: As the symbol of fire, Yao is clad in red and inspired by Chinese.
- Océane: As the goddess of water, Océane's costume is Indian inspired and green in color.
- Azala: As the goddess of air, Azala's primary color is blue. Her dress is fashioned with Asian crystal beads.
- Gaya: As the goddess of earth, Gaya's color is Ochre. Her costume is inspired by African designs.
- L'Âme Force: The texture on the front of their golden costumes is made by moulding small plastic soldiers.
- Dralions: The dralions are constructed from a mélange of items both natural and synthetic: lycra, leather, silk, mosquito netting, polystyrene foam, springs, raffia, horse hair, emu feathers, and other fabrics and decorations.

== Music ==
With the company's departure from its longtime creative team, Dralion features the work of a new Cirque composer, French-Canadian composer Violaine Corradi. The music of Dralion aims to be a fusion of sounds from East and West by the use of acoustic and electric instruments. Featuring rhythmic and lyrical motifs, the influences range from Indian melodies to sounds from Andalusia, Africa, Central Europe, and the West. Instruments used in the CD are drums, violin, winds, keyboards, guitar and percussion instructions. Released on November 9, 1999, Dralion’s soundtrack features the vocals of Basque counter-tenor Erik Karol, and Canadian female vocalist Agnès Sohier. The tracks for the CD are listed below, with their corresponding acts alongside in italics.

The original album artwork of Dralion by Heidi Taillefer, 1999

Track listing

1. Stella Errans (Single Handbalancing, 1999 - 2015)
2. Ombra
  - Foot Juggling (Rotation, 1999 - 2010)
  - Contortion with Bowls (Rotation, 1999 - 2000)
  - Balancing on Chairs (Rotation, 2010 - 2012)
  - Contortion (Rotation, 2012 - 2014)
3. Spiritual Spiral
  - Setup to Double Trapeze, (1999 - 2010)
  - Setup to Skipping Rope, (2014 - 2015)
4. Miracula Æternitatis
  - Spirits (1999 - 2014)
  - Crossed Cyr Wheel
5. Bamboo (Bamboo Poles, 1999 - 2015)
6. Ballare
  - Aerial Pas de Deux, (1999 - 2015)
  - Aerial Straps (Rotation, 2010 - 2015)
7. Ravendhi (Teeterboard, 1999 - 2005)
8. Ninkou Latora
  - Double Trapeze (1999 - 2010)
  - Crossed Cyr Wheel (2012 - 2015)
9. Aborigenes Jam (Hoop Diving, 1999 - 2015)
10. Hinkò (Ballet on Lightbulbs, 1999 - 2010)
11. Kamandé (Skipping Rope and Finale, 1999 - 2015)

Other songs

1. Kalimba (Animation)
2. La Ruota Della Vita (Opening, early 1999)
3. Elements (Opening, 1999 - 2015)
4. Salute to Hildegard/Lédjenda dil solé
  - Opening, (1999 - 2015)
  - Prelude to Skipping Rope (1999 - August 2014)
5. Eaux Vives/Naya (Single Handbalancing Intro)
6. Exaequo (Juggling Prelude)
7. Momma Kee (Juggling, Viktor Kee version, 1999 - 2006)
8. Vladik-Jug (Juggling, Vladik Myagkostoupov version, 2006 - 2015)
9. Lanterne (Lanterns, 1999 - 2015)
10. Montée du Soleil (Soleil Tilt, 1999 - 2015)
11. Bombarde (Dralions, 1999 - 2015)
12. Hibana (Aerial Hoop, 2001 - 2015)
13. Anima (Aerial Hoop, 2001 - 2015)
14. Trampo-mur (Trampolines, 2005 - 2015)
15. Spring Away (Diabolos, 2010 - 2015)
16. Medusa (Medusa, 2010 - 2015)
17. Contre Yuke (Clown act, 1999 - 2001)
18. Foulards (Clown act, 1999 - 2001)
19. Hairpiece (Clown act, 2001 - 2015)
20. The Ascension to Galaxy/Shine (Clown act, 2001 - 2015)
21. Clowns (Prelude to Clown act, 2005 - 2015)
22. Parodie (Clown act, 1999 - 2015)
23. Lahhy Storia/Contre-poids (Prelude to Skipping Rope, 1999 - 2015)

=== Vocalists ===
==== Female Singers ====
- Agnès Sohier:
  - From April 22, 1999 (Montreal) to Fall 2004 (Madrid)
  - From March 17, 2005 (Barcelona) to January 18, 2015 (Anchorage)
- Laur Fugère:
  - From April 4, 2001, to May 20, 2001 (New York City)
  - From October 2, 2003, to December 14, 2003 (Mexico City)
- Estelle Esse - From Fall 2004 (Madrid) to February 6, 2005 (London)

==== Male Singers ====
- Érik Karol:
  - From April 22, 1999 (Montreal) to January 28, 2001 (Atlanta)
  - From June 3, 2004 (Vienna) to February 6, 2005 (London)
  - From September 8, 2005 (Zurich) to February 26, 2006 (Sevilla)
- Frank Irving - From February 14, 2001 (Miami) to December 16, 2001 (Dallas)
- Robert Fertitta - From March 6, 2002 (Los Angeles) to December 21, 2002 (Phoenix)
- Calvin Braxton:
  - From February 6, 2003 (New Orleans) to May 23, 2004 (Amsterdam)
  - From March 17, 2005 (Barcelona) to August 28, 2005 (Ostend)
  - From March 10, 2006 (Geneva) to August 2008 (Sydney)*
- Cristian Zabala:
  - 2007 - 2008 (Japan)*
  - From October 21, 2010 (Trenton) to June 9, 2013 (Guatemala City)
  - From October 2, 2014 (Albany) to January 18, 2015 (Anchorage)
- Chad Oliver - From July 16, 2008 (Sydney) to January 17, 2010 (Mexico)
- Josue Anuar - From July 9, 2013 (Amnéville) to September 6, 2014 (Palma de Mallorca)

*During the 2007-2008 Japan tour, Calvin Braxton and Cristian Zabala alternated the role.

== Tour ==
After premiering under the Grand Chapiteau in 1999, "Dralion" was briefly retired in December 2009. In mid-2010, the show began the arena restaging process, having its first dress rehearsal at the John Paul Jones Arena in Charlottesville, VA before beginning its arena tour in October 2010 in Trenton, NJ. After touring for an additional four years in the arena, the show returned to North America in the fall of 2014 to begin its "Farewell Tour". On January 18, 2015, "Dralion" performed for the final time in Anchorage, AK.

The following colorboxes indicate the region of each performance: EU Europe NA North America SA South and Central America AP Asia/Pacific OC Oceania AF Africa

=== Grand Chapiteau tour ===
1999-2009

==== 1999 schedule ====
- NA Montréal, QC - From 22 Apr 1999 (show premiere)
- NA Québec, QC - From 24 Jun 1999
- NA Toronto, ON - From 29 Jul 1999 to 5 Sep 1999
- NA Santa Monica, CA - From 23 Sep 1999 to 21 Nov 1999
- NA Irvine, CA - From 2 Dec 1999

==== 2000 schedule ====
- NA San Francisco, CA - From 3 Feb 2000
- NA San Jose, CA - From 6 Apr 2000
- NA Denver, CO - From 9 Jun 2000
- NA Minneapolis, MN - From 17 Aug 2000
- NA Washington, DC - From 11 Oct 2000 to 19 Nov 2000
- NA Atlanta, GA - From 30 Nov 2000 to 28 Jan 2001

==== 2001 schedule ====
- NA Miami, FL - From 14 Feb 2001 to 18 Mar 2001
- NA New York, NY - From 4 Apr 2001 to 20 May 2001
- NA Chicago, IL - From 22 Jun 2001 to 15 Jul 2001
- NA Boston, MA - From 15 Aug 2001 to 16 Sep 2001
- NA Philadelphia, PA - From 27 Sep 2001 to 4 Nov 2001
- NA Dallas, TX - From 16 Nov 2001 to 9 Dec 2001

==== 2002 schedule ====
- NA Houston, TX - From 17 Jan 2002 to 17 Feb 2002
- NA Santa Monica, CA - From 6 Mar 2002 to 24 Mar 2002
- NA San Diego, CA - From 18 Apr 2002 to 12 May 2002
- NA Portland, OR - From 12 Jun 2002 to 21 Jul 2002
- NA Seattle, WA - From 1 Aug 2002 to 15 Sep 2002
- NA Sacramento, CA - From 4 Oct 2002 to 20 Oct 2002
- NA Phoenix, AZ - From 13 Nov 2002 to 8 Dec 2002

==== 2003 schedule ====
- NA New Orleans, LA - From 6 Feb 2003 to 2 Mar 2003
- NA Raleigh, NC - From 13 Mar 2003 to 5 Apr 2003
- NA Baltimore, MD - From 11 Apr 2003 to 4 May 2003
- NA Montréal, QC - From 15 May 2003 to 15 Jun 2003
- NA Hartford, CT - From 24 Jun 2003 to 13 Jul 2003
- NA Columbus, OH - From 24 Jul 2003 to 10 Aug 2003
- NA St. Louis, MO - From 23 Aug 2003 to 14 Sep 2003
- NA Mexico City, MX - From 2 Oct 2003 to 14 Dec 2003

==== 2004 schedule ====
(Dralion played in the Royal Albert Hall in London, UK during this time)

- EU Amsterdam, NL - From 27 Feb 2004 to 23 May 2004
- EU Vienna, AT - From 3 Jun 2004 to 1 Aug 2004
- EU Antwerp, BE - From 12 Aug 2004 to 3 Oct 2004
- EU Madrid, ES - From 15 Oct 2004 to 21 Dec 2004

==== 2005 schedule ====
(Dralion played in the Royal Albert Hall in London, UK during this time)

- EU Barcelona, ES - From 17 Mar 2005 to 24 Apr 2005
- EU Rotterdam, NL - From 3 Jun 2005 to 19 Jun 2005
- EU Oostende, BE - From 21 Jul 2005 to 28 Aug 2005
- EU Zurich, CH - From 8 Sep 2005 to 6 Nov 2005
- EU Bilbao, ES - From 18 Nov 2005 to 8 Jan 2006

==== 2006 schedule ====
- EU Seville, ES - From 19 Jan 2006 to 26 Feb 2006
- EU Geneva, CH - From 10 Mar 2006 to 16 Apr 2006
- EU Valencia, ES - From 4 May 2006 to 11 Jun 2006
- EU Málaga, ES - From 22 Jun 2006 to 30 Jul 2006
- EU Berlin, DE - From 30 Aug 2006 to 5 Oct 2006
- EU Frankfurt, DE - From 19 Oct 2006 to 26 Nov 2006
- EU Düsseldorf, DE - From 7 Dec 2006 to 7 Jan 2007

==== 2007 schedule ====
- AP Tokyo, JP - From 7 Feb 2007 to 6 May 2007
- AP Sendai, JP - From 23 May 2007 to 8 Jul 2007
- AP Osaka, JP - From 25 Jul 2007 to 14 Oct 2007
- AP Nagoya, JP - From 31 Oct 2007 to 6 Jan 2008

==== 2008 schedule ====
- AP Tokyo, JP - From 25 Jan 2008 to 6 Apr 2008
- AP Fukuoka, JP - From 23 Apr 2008 to 15 Jun 2008
- OC Sydney, AU - From 16 Jul 2008 to 12 Oct 2008
- OC Canberra, AU - From 23 Oct 2008 to 16 Nov 2008
- OC Brisbane, AU - From 27 Nov 2008 to 11 Jan 2009

==== 2009 schedule ====
- OC Perth, AU - From 29 Jan 2009 to 25 Mar 2009
- OC Melbourne, AU - From 10 Apr 2009 to 14 Jun 2009
- OC Auckland, NZ - From 9 Jul 2009 to 24 Aug 2009
- NA Monterrey, MX - From 17 Sep 2009 to 11 Oct 2009
- NA Guadalajara, MX - From 22 Oct 2009 to 15 Nov 2009
- NA Mexico City, MX - From 26 Nov 2009 to 17 Jan 2010 (final show under Big Top)

=== Arena tour ===
2004, 2005, 2010-2015

==== 2004 schedule ====
- EU London, UK - Royal Albert Hall - From 9 Jan 2004 to 15 Feb 2004

==== 2005 schedule ====
- EU London, UK - Royal Albert Hall - From 6 Jan 2005 to 6 Feb 2005

==== 2010 schedule ====
- NA Trenton, NJ - From 21 Oct 2010 to 24 Oct 2010
- NA Buffalo, NY - From 27 Oct 2010 to 31 Oct 2010
- NA Reading, PA - From 3 Nov 2010 to 7 Nov 2010
- NA Youngstown, OH - From 10 Nov 2010 to 14 Nov 2010
- NA Windsor, ON - From 17 Nov 2010 to 21 Nov 2010
- NA Oshawa, ON - From 24 Nov 2010 to 28 Nov 2010
- NA Worcester, MA - From 16 Dec 2010 to 19 Dec 2010
- NA Philadelphia, PA - From 21 Dec 2010 to 2 Jan 2011

==== 2011 schedule ====
- NA Boston, MA - From 5 Jan 2011 to 9 Jan 2011
- NA Grand Rapids, MI - From 12 Jan 2011 to 16 Jan 2011
- NA St. Louis, MO - From 19 Jan 2011 to 23 Jan 2011
- NA Chicago, IL - From 26 Jan 2011 to 30 Jan 2011
- NA Mobile, AL - From 2 Feb 2011 to 6 Feb 2011
- NA Columbus, OH - From 9 Feb 2011 to 13 Feb 2011
- NA Detroit, MI - From 16 Feb 2011 to 20 Feb 2011
- NA Austin, TX - From 10 Mar 2011 to 21 Mar 2011
- NA San Antonio, TX - From 23 Mar 2011 to 27 Mar 2011
- NA Des Moines, IA - From 30 Mar 2011 to 3 Apr 2011
- NA Fargo, ND - From 5 Apr 2011 to 7 Apr 2011
- NA Sioux City, IA - From 9 Apr 2011 to 10 Apr 2011
- NA Council Bluffs, IA - From 13 Apr 2011 to 17 Apr 2011
- NA Moline, IL - From 19 Apr 2011 to 20 Apr 2011
- NA Peoria, IL - From 22 Apr 2011 to 24 Apr 2011
- NA Madison, WI - From 26 Apr 2011 to 27 Apr 2011
- NA Green Bay, WI - From 29 Apr 2011 to 1 May 2011
- NA Rockford, IL - From 4 May 2011 to 8 May 2011
- NA Kansas City, MO - From 11 May 2011 to 15 May 2011
- NA Abbotsford, BC - From 2 Jun 2011 to 5 Jun 2011
- NA Eugene, OR - From 8 Jun 2011 to 12 Jun 2011
- NA Portland, OR - From 15 Jun 2011 to 19 Jun 2011
- NA Victoria, BC - From 22 Jun 2011 to 26 Jun 2011
- NA Penticton, BC - From 29 Jun 2011 to 3 Jul 2011
- NA Edmonton, AB - From 6 Jul 2011 to 10 Jul 2011
- NA Saskatoon, SK - From 13 Jul 2011 to 17 Jul 2011
- NA Winnipeg, MB - From 20 Jul 2011 to 24 Jul 2011
- NA Frisco, TX - From 27 Jul 2011 to 31 Jul 2011
- NA Indianapolis, IN - From 3 Aug 2011 to 7 Aug 2011
- NA Atlanta, GA - From 25 Aug 2011 to 28 Aug 2011
- NA Duluth, GA - From 31 Aug 2011 to 4 Sep 2011
- NA Tupelo, MS - From 6 Sep 2011 to 8 Sep 2011
- NA Huntsville, AL - From 10 Sep 2011 to 11 Sep 2011
- NA New Orleans, LA - From 14 Sep 2011 to 17 Sep 2011
- NA Orlando, FL - From 21 Sep 2011 to 25 Sep 2011
- NA Tallahassee, FL - From 28 Sep 2011 to 2 Oct 2011
- NA Birmingham, AL - From 5 Oct 2011 to 9 Oct 2011
- NA Gainesville, FL - From 11 Oct 2011 to 13 Oct 2011
- NA San Juan, PR - From 19 Oct 2011 to 23 Oct 2011
- NA Santo Domingo, DO - From 27 Oct 2011 to 30 Oct 2011
- NA Cypress, TX - From 17 Nov 2011 to 20 Nov 2011
- NA Beaumont, TX - From 23 Nov 2011 to 27 Nov 2011
- NA Houston, TX - From 30 Nov 2011 to 4 Dec 2011
- NA Lafayette, LA - From 6 Dec 2011 to 8 Dec 2011
- NA Bossier City, LA - From 10 Dec 2011 to 11 Dec 2011
- NA Little Rock, AR - From 13 Dec 2011 to 14 Dec 2011
- NA Montréal, QC - From 18 Dec 2011 to 30 Dec 2011

==== 2012 schedule ====
- NA Quebec, QC - From 3 Jan 2012 to 8 Jan 2012
- NA Kingston, ON - From 11 Jan 2012 to 15 Jan 2012
- NA Loveland, CO - From 2 Feb 2012 to 5 Feb 2012
- NA Broomfield, CO - From 8 Feb 2012 to 12 Feb 2012
- NA El Paso, TX - From 15 Feb 2012 to 19 Feb 2012
- NA Colorado Springs, CO - From 22 Feb 2012 to 26 Feb 2012
- NA Río Rancho, NM - From 29 Feb 2012 to 4 Mar 2012
- NA Laredo, TX - From 6 Mar 2012 to 7 Mar 2012
- NA Corpus Christi, TX - From 9 Mar 2012 to 11 Mar 2012
- NA Hidalgo, TX - From 14 Mar 2012 to 18 Mar 2012
- NA College Station, TX - From 21 Mar to 25 Mar 2012
- NA Highland Heights, KY - From 28 Mar 2012 to 1 Apr 2012
- NA Cleveland, OH - From 4 Apr 2012 to 8 Apr 2012
- NA Hamilton, ON - From 26 Apr 2012 to 29 Apr 2012
- NA Halifax, NS - From 2 May 2012 to 6 May 2012
- NA Saint John, NB - From 9 May 2012 to 13 May 2012
- NA London, ON - From 16 May 2012 to 20 May 2012
- NA Rochester, NY - From 23 May 2012 to 27 May 2012
- NA Manchester, NH - From 30 May 2012 to 3 Jun 2012
- NA Syracuse, NY - From 6 Jun 2012 to 10 Jun 2012
- NA Bridgeport, CT - From 13 Jun 2012 to 17 Jun 2012
- NA Rosemont, IL - From 20 Jun 2012 to 24 Jun 2012
- NA Chicago, IL - From 27 Jun 2012 to 1 Jul 2012
- NA Sunrise, FL - From 19 Jul 2012 to 29 Jul 2012
- NA Estero, FL - From 1 Aug 2012 to 5 Aug 2012
- NA Richmond, VA - From 8 Aug 2012 to 12 Aug 2012
- NA Raleigh, NC - From 15 Aug 2012 to 19 Aug 2012
- NA Baltimore, MD - From 22 Aug 2012 to 26 Aug 2012
- NA Atlantic City, NJ - From 29 Aug 2012 to 2 Sep 2012
- NA Uniondale, NY - From 5 Sep 2012 to 9 Sep 2012
- NA Charleston, WV - From 12 Sep 2012 to 16 Sep 2012
- NA Minneapolis, MN - From 19 Sep 2012 to 23 Sep 2012
- NA Boise, ID - From 11 Oct 2012 to 14 Oct 2012
- NA Stockton, CA - From 17 Oct 2012 to 21 Oct 2012
- NA Ontario, CA - From 24 Oct 2012 to 28 Oct 2012
- NA Long Beach, CA - From 31 Oct 2012 to 4 Nov 2012
- NA Fresno, CA - From 7 Nov 2012 to 11 Nov 2012
- NA San Diego, CA - From 14 Nov 2012 to 18 Nov 2012
- NA Tucson, AZ - From 21 Nov 2012 to 25 Nov 2012
- NA Phoenix, AZ - From 28 Nov 2012 to 02 Dec 2012
- NA Topeka, KS - From 05 Dec 2012 to 09 Dec 2012
- NA Tulsa, OK - From 12 Dec 2012 to 16 Dec 2012
- NA Oklahoma City, OK - From 19 Dec 2012 to 23 Dec 2012

==== 2013 schedule ====
- AP Dubai, AE - From 6 Feb 2013 to 16 Feb 2013
- AF Cape Town, ZA - From 5 Mar 2013 to 17 Mar 2013
- AF Johannesburg, ZA - From 21 Mar 2013 to 1 Apr 2013
- SA Caracas, VE - From 25 Apr 2013 to 12 May 2013
- SA Panama City, PA - From 22 May 2013 to 26 May 2013
- SA Guatemala City, GT - From 5 Jun 2013 to 9 Jun 2013
- EU Amneville, FR - From 9 Jul 2013 to 13 Jul 2013
- EU Nice, FR - From 18 Jul 2013 to 28 Jul 2013
- EU Nantes, FR - From 31 Jul 2013 to 4 Aug 2013
- AP Doha, QA - From 19 Sep 2013 to 28 Sep 2013
- AP Beirut, LB - From 10 Oct 2013 20 Oct 2013
- EU Athens, GR - From 29 Oct 2013 to 3 Nov 2013
- EU Rome, IT - From 8 Nov 2013 to 17 Nov 2013
- EU Turin, IT - From 21 Nov 2013 to 24 Nov 2013
- EU Milan, IT - From 28 Nov 2013 to 1 Dec 2013
- EU Geneva, CH - From 4 Dec 2013 to 8 Dec 2013
- EU Basel, CH - From 11 Dec 2013 to 15 Dec 2013
- EU Barcelona, ES - From 18 Dec 2013 to 29 Dec 2013

==== 2014 schedule ====
- EU Lisbon, PT - From 1 Jan 2014 to 12 Jan 2014
- EU St-Petersburg, RU - From 22 Jan 2014 to 2 Feb 2014
- EU Chelyabinsk, RU - From 7 Feb 2014 to 16 Feb 2014
- EU Kazan, RU - From 21 Feb 2014 to 2 March 2014
- EU Moscow, RU - From 6 Mar 2014 to 16 Mar 2014
- EU Minsk, BY - From 20 Mar 2014 to 23 Mar 2014
- EU Herning, DK - From 27 Mar 2014 to 30 Mar 2014
- EU Wroclaw, PL - From 3 Apr 2014 to 6 Apr 2014
- EU Malmö, SE - From 1 May 2014 to 4 May 2014
- EU Glasgow, UK - From 8 May 2014 to 11 May 2014
- EU Sheffield, UK - From 14 May 2014 to 18 May 2014
- EU Birmingham, UK - From 22 May 2014 to 25 May 2014
- EU Dublin, IE - From 28 May 2014 to 1 Jun 2014
- EU London, UK - From 4 Jun 2014 to 8 Jun 2014
- EU Manchester, UK - From 11 Jun 2014 to 15 Jun 2014
- EU San Sebastian, ES - From 3 Jul 2014 to 6 Jul 2014
- EU Santiago de Compostela, ES - From 10 Jul 2014 to 20 Jul 2014
- EU Granada, ES - From 23 Jul 2014 to 27 Jul 2014
- EU Las Palmas de Gran Canaria, ES - From 2 Aug 2014 to 10 Aug 2014
- EU Bilbao, ES - From 16 Aug 2014 to 24 Aug 2014
- EU Palma de Mallorca, ES - From 28 Aug 2014 to 6 Sep 2014
- NA Albany, NY - From 2 Oct 2014 to 5 Oct 2014
- NA State College, PA - 8 Oct 2014 to 12 Oct 2014
- NA Wilkes-Barre, PA - From 15 Oct 2014 to 19 Oct 2014
- NA Charlottesville, VA - From 22 Oct 2014 to 26 Oct 2014
- NA Sault Ste Marie, ON - From 29 Oct 2014 to 2 Nov 2014
- NA Fort Wayne, IN - From 5 Nov 2014 to 9 Nov 2014
- NA Bloomington, IL - From 12 Nov 2014 to 16 Nov 2014
- NA Cedar Rapids, IA - From 19 Nov 2014 to 23 Nov 2014
- NA Duluth, MN - From 26 Nov 2014 to 30 Nov 2014
- NA Kearney, NE - From 3 Dec 2014 to 7 Dec 2014
- NA Regina, SK - From 10 Dec 2014 to 14 Dec 2014
- NA Lethbridge, AB - From 17 Dec 2014 to 21 Dec 2014
- NA Kamloops, BC - From 24 Dec 2014 to 28 Dec 2014
- NA Prince George, BC - From 31 Dec 2014 to 4 Jan 2015

==== 2015 schedule ====
- NA Fairbanks, AK - From 8 Jan 2015 to 11 Jan 2015
- NA Anchorage, AK - From 14 Jan 2015 to 18 Jan 2015 (final show)
