= Benoît Jutras =

Canadian composer (born 1963)

- Born: 1963 (age 62–63); Montreal, Quebec, Canada
- Genres: Theatre
- Occupation: Composer

Benoît Jutras (born 1963) is a Canadian composer. Jutras is best known for his work with the Canadian entertainment company Cirque du Soleil, first as music director and later as composer for several of the company's contemporary circus shows. Jutras' music often blends eclectic influences, including world beat, classical, rock, trip hop, and electronica. His scores for Cirque du Soleil shows include O, Mystère, Quidam, and La Nouba. His work outside Cirque du Soleil has included original soundtracks for Le Rêve (a show at the Wynn resort in Las Vegas), the Glow in the Park Parade (a nighttime parade at Six Flags theme parks), and The House of Dancing Water (a show at the City of Dreams resort in Macau). He has also composed for film and television.

Born in Montreal, Quebec, Canada, Jutras now resides in Barbados. He has one daughter, Audrey Brisson-Jutras, who performed and sang in Quidam as the principal character Zoé. (Her performance can be seen on the DVD that Cirque du Soleil has released of the show.) Jutras also has a brother, François Jutras. His sister-in-law is Roxane Potvin, lead singer for the Cirque du Soleil show O.

"With globalization, a merging of musical styles is certain and the final objective is not to simply extract what is obvious but to merge the real essence of each style in order to create something authentic, innovative and fun." —Benoît Jutras

== Selected soundtracks ==
- 1992: Fascination (Cirque du Soleil touring show in Japan; co-composed with René Dupéré)
- 1993: Mystère (resident Cirque du Soleil show at the Treasure Island Hotel and Casino in Las Vegas; co-composed with René Dupéré)
- 1996: Quidam (touring Cirque du Soleil show)
- 1998: O (resident Cirque du Soleil show at the Bellagio in Las Vegas)
- 1998: La Nouba (resident Cirque du Soleil show at the Walt Disney World Resort in Lake Buena Vista, Florida)
- 1999: Alegría (feature film by Cirque du Soleil)
- 2000: Journey of Man (IMAX film by Cirque du Soleil)
- 2000: Francesco il Musical (stage musical at the Lyrick Theater in Assisi, Italy)
- 2003: Far Side of the Moon (film directed by Robert Lepage)
- 2005: Le Rêve (water-themed show at the Wynn resort in Las Vegas)
- 2008: Borderline (Canadian film directed by Lyne Charlebois)
- 2008: Glow in the Park Parade (nighttime parade presented at Six Flags parks)
- 2010: The House of Dancing Water (water-themed show at the City of Dreams resort in Macau)
- 2012: Cirque du Soleil: Worlds Away (A Cirque du Soleil 3D film directed by Andrew Adamson)
- 2014: The Han Show (resident acrobatic show in Wuhan, China directed by Franco Dragone)
- 2019: Drawn to Life (resident Cirque du Soleil show at the Walt Disney World Resort in Lake Buena Vista, Florida)

== See also ==
- Cirque du Soleil discography
