= Dragone (company) =

Creative company

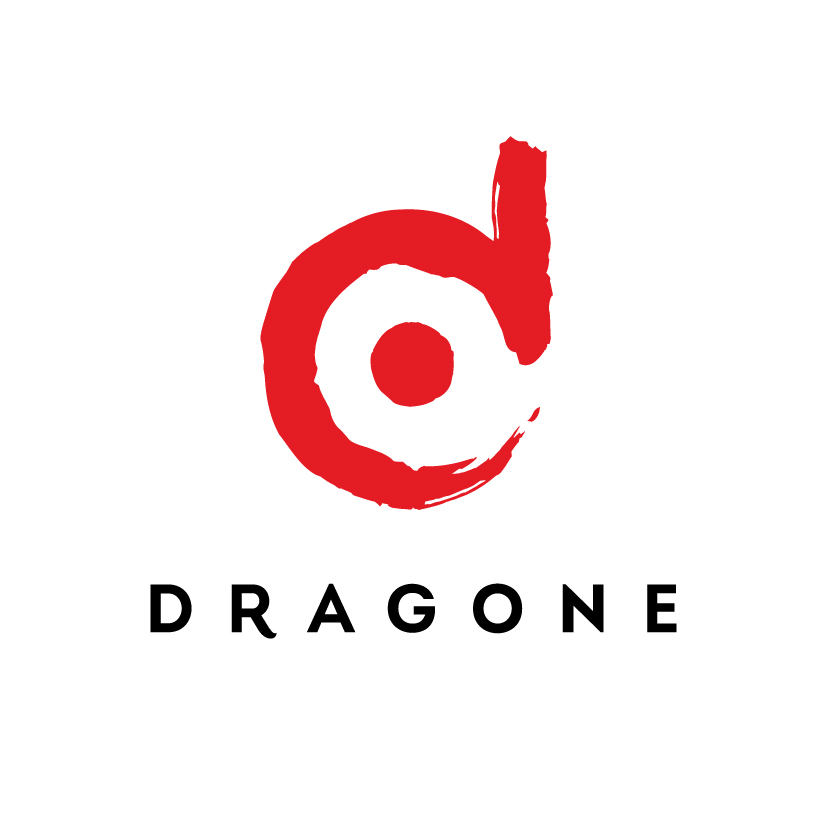
- Type: Private company
- Industry: Entertainment
- Founded: 2000; 26 years ago
- Founder: Franco Dragone
- Headquarters: Las Vegas, United States of America & Luxembourg,
- Area served: Worldwide
- Website: dragone.com

Dragone is a Las Vegas and Luxembourg based creative company specializing in the creation of large scale theater shows. It was founded in 2000 by Franco Dragone. Formerly known as Franco Dragone Entertainment Group (FDEG), the company became Dragone in 2014. The company, previously based in La Louvière, Belgium, has created in excess of forty "permanent shows", in addition to events in more than 12 countries across Europe, the Middle East, in the United States, South America and Asia.

== History ==
=== Origins ===
The company was founded in 2000 by Franco Dragone, who had acquired experience in the circus industry in the ’80s and ‘90s, creating many shows with the Cirque du Soleil. Since its foundation, Dragone has been responsible for the creation and production of dozens of shows and original events.

=== Local anchorage ===
The company was based in the Belgian city of La Louvière, the region where Franco Dragone moved to with his family when he was a young child in the 1950s. The presence of the company has showcased the city internationally, through local actions and events. Dragone has also captured attention due to the visits and participation of celebrities in their shows, such as Sting, Jeffrey Katzenberg or Celine Dion.

==== Décrocher la lune ====
"Décrocher la lune" is an event organised by Dragone, which seeks to combine entertainment and social concerns in a manner which includes participatory action by the community. In March 2000, the first such “Décrocher la lune” was held in March 2000, in La Louvière. Other iterations of the festival took place in 2006, 2009, 2012 and 2015. Since 2014, the scheme has been renamed to the “Agence Lunaire”, which is now responsible for the project.

==== 5 sur 5 ====
Created in 2004, the Festival 5 sur 5 offered young directors from around the world to express their point of view on La Louvière through short films. The project was managed by the non-profit organization Espace Dragone, which represented the company's citizen base. The project successfully ran for thirteen consecutive years.

== Economic issues and judicial difficulties ==
In October 2012, the company premises were searched. Franco Dragone faced charges for tax evasion; the case is still under investigation and the judicial investigation is not complete. Between 2016 and 2017, an unfavorable economic environment resulted in Dragone experiencing significant cash flow difficulties. To maintain the activity in its Belgian base, and to save the jobs of its employees, the company engaged itself in a procedure in judicial reorganization (PRJ), which will be ultimately approved by the Commercial Court of Mons, which will pronounce the sustainability of the activity.

== Shows ==
The so-called permanent shows are the hallmarks of the company. They are intended to be performed for a minimum period of 10 years, typically in theaters specifically built for Dragone shows. The shows heavily incorporate technology and special effects. These shows include several types of performances inspired by traditional and contemporary circus. Dragone has specialized in the development of aquatic theater, under the stage of which hides a swimming pool of several million liters, allowing the use of a third play area, in addition to the aerial and aquatic ones. The shows are intricately developed by various teams within the company, including the following units: Casting, Talents & Trends, Architecture & Design, Illustration and Video, Costumes.

Shows organised by the company include the following that can be broadly categorized into three divisions:

=== From Las Vegas to Dubai ===
==== A New Day... ====
In March 2003, the new Colosseum at Caesars Palace in Las Vegas held the premiere of Celine Dion’s A New Day..., a show created and directed by Franco Dragone. Celine Dion had previously seen and loved O and she even temporarily moved to Belgium so the two could closely collaborate on the show she dreamed of... In this show, says the artistic director, “I see Celine as a satellite that captures the images of another world and sends them back to the audience. The stage becomes a secret universe that she shares very intimately with the audience”; while Celine Dion thinks the world of its “magician”. The show was performed every night for five years in front of a full house.

==== Le Rêve ====
In 2005, Le Rêve, entirely conceived in the workshops of La Louvière, took place in the setting of Steve Wynn’s casino hotel, the Wynn Las Vegas. The aquatic scene is surrounded by more than 2000 seats and contains over 3500m³ of water. The dome rises 25m from the stage. This show is very intimate despite the technical means implemented, since the farthest of the two thousand spectators, in the fourteenth row, is only twelve meters from the stage.

==== Lido - Paris Merveilles ====
Among the projects, contacts were gradually established with the owners of the Lido, a famous cabaret located on the Champs-Élysées and the service company Sodexo. And in the beginning of 2013, the first auditions were held in Paris. The new performers of the troupe were selected during a rigorous casting process while the Lido transformation work started. In March 2015, the day before the premier, the costumes created by Nicolas Vaudelet were transported to Paris for the final fittings. When the curtain rose a completely new show was presented to the audience; a revue of a new kind, very rock, leading the audience to discover an eternal Paris to the music of Saule and Yvan Cassar, other faithful accomplices of Franco Dragone.

==== La Perle ====
The premiere of “La Perle” took place on September 13, 2017 in the heart of the Al Habtoor City Resort. La Perle is the first Las Vegas style permanent show of this scale in the UAE, performed in an aquatic theater, designed by Jean Rabasse and the Dragone Studio, with 1300 seats and 450 performances a year. For the artistic director Franco Dragone, La Perle is intended to present Dubai as “a laboratory of the future where people of diverse cultures create something spectacular together”. Several celebrities like Sheikh Mohammed bin Rachid Al Maktoum, Lindsay Lohan and Ronaldinho attended the show.

=== Asian adventure ===
==== The House of Dancing Water ====
In the fall of 2010 in the theater of extraordinary dimensions of the complex “City of Dreams”, Macau, the premier of, “The House of Dancing Water” (THODW), a permanent water show, took place. Created, designed and developed in La Louvière and rehearsed in Alfacam's studios, near Antwerp, Belgium, marked the beginning of a new milestone in the history of Dragone: the entry into Asia.

This first show on Chinese soil came about after a meeting between Franco Dragone and Lawrence Ho, co-chairman and CEO of Melco Crown Entertainment, which will open a new resort “City of Dreams”. During the first five years of its operation, THODW welcomed more than 3 million spectators and won four prestigious awards in the world of design and international marketing.

The Macau experience confirmed the international vocation of the Company. In the process, the company is implementing a completely new type of contract and of an unprecedented scale with the powerful Dalian Wanda Group, the Chinese leader in commercial real estate development, luxury hotels and cultural industry, and chaired by Wang Jianlin. This contract covers the design, creation, production and operation of several unique shows in different Chinese cities, for a minimum of ten years

==== The Han Show ====
The Han show has been paying tribute to the essence of Han culture since opening in December, 2014.

The lantern-shaped theater that houses the show has forever changed the urban landscape of Wuhan, capital of the Hubei Province. Inspired by the typical lines of the so-called “red lanterns”, the theater was designed by world-renowned architect Mark Fisher and his team at Stufish. The theater is more than 70 meters high and 100 meters wide on each side offers pedestrians and spectators a real outdoor show with the ballet of lights illuminating its facade.

At the beginning of each performance the 2000 spectators discover the swimming pool, which holds 10 million liters of water, hidden under the stage thanks to a unique system that allows the seats to move, modifying the configuration of the room. The 95 artists, from all disciplines, selected by the casting department at Dragone, perform 10 shows per week.

Now, in Langfang, near Beijing, in a studio built to train the artists for the show, training and formation is being developed with the support of a Beijing's university, on a model that should extend to other regions of the globe.

==== The Dai Show ====
In 2015, Dragone created and produced the second show commissioned by the Wanda Group. The Dai Show is a tribute to a world where man still lives in harmony with nature: that of the Dai people. This is the traditional beneficial energy that fueled the show and inspired the construction of its theater in Xishuangbanna, southwest China, on the border with Burma and Laos.

=== Time for diversification ===
Over time, the company progressed in the diversification of its activities. Departments within the company, such as the illustration department or Dragone Costumes can take on contracts independently of the parent company. For example, for Holliday on Ice - Ice Age and Peter Pan - The Never Ending Story, in Abu Dhabi.

While the main company is venturing into new challenges such as cabaret, touring shows with singers, lyrical art (training, opera creation) or the artistic direction of theme parks.

==== Taboo ====
Between 2012 and 2015, Dragone invested in the world of traditional cabaret with the show Taboo. Mixing sophisticated and sensual choreography with sexy acrobatic performances, Taboo invited the audience to a mischievous trip to “Cubic”, the Cabaret set up in the heart of Macau's City of Dreams complex. Audiences could witness pole dancing, striptease, hand-to-hand, dance and performances involving fire highlighted by an important work on sound, light and especially video projections. The biggest names in Cabaret and Burlesque contributed to the fame of Taboo, such as Dita Von Teese and the Bluebell Girls from the Lido in Paris.

==== Me ====
For the second time in more than a decade, Dragone created a show for the popstar: Philip Kirkorov, a Russian artist who has won 5 World Music Awards. For this creation entitled “Я” (Me), the 30 songs of the show were all revisited to breathe new life into Kirkorov's popular hits, without betraying their original spirit, deeply rooted in the Russian soul. The premiere of the Kirkorov's international tour took place on March 18, 2016, in the prestigious theater of the Grand Kremlin Palace.

==== The Land of Legends ====
Franco Dragone managed the artistic direction of an innovative theme park, in a partnership with the Rixos Hotels group. The Land of Legends, Turkey’s largest theme park, opened during the summer of 2016 in the city of Antalya. For Dragone, this opportunity allowed him to develop a creative concept, characters, performances and a world where the visitor, as the viewer on other stages, is invited to enter the park and experience their own legend.

== List of shows and events ==
=== Permanent shows ===
- 2003-2007: A New Day... (Las Vegas - United States). Celine Dion show.
- 2005-2020: Le Rêve (Las Vegas - United States). Permanent show in Steve Wynn's casino hotel.
- 2010-...: The House of Dancing Water (Macau - China). Permanent show of a 2000-seat theater created for the occasion.
- 2012-2016: Taboo (Macau - China). Cabaret show.
- 2014-...: The Han Show (Wuhan - China). Permanent show in a theater filled with innovative technology.
- 2015-2022: Lido - Paris Merveilles (Paris - France). New revue of the legendary Parisian cabaret: The Lido.
- 2015-...: The Dai Show (Xishuangbanna - China). Permanent show, inspired by the traditional Chinese Dai culture.
- 2016-... : The Land of Legends (Antalya - Turkey). Theme park in a large Rixos Hotels complex.
- 2017-...: La Perle (Dubai - UAE). Las Vegas style permanent show integrated into the real estate site of Habtoor City.

=== Events ===
- 2000-...: Décrocher la lune (La Louvière - Belgium). Urban opera.
- 2000: Kick Off Euro 2000 (Brussels - Belgium). Opening ceremony of the FIFA Football European Championship.
- 2001: Chapeau Europa (Brussels - Belgium). Opening performance of the Belgian Presidency of the European Union.
- 2002: Disney Cinema Parade (Marne-la-Vallée - France). Dancing Parade of the new Parisian Walt Disney Studios Park.
- 2002: Gueules Noires (Marcinelle - Belgium). Memorial performance of the disaster that occurred in the Bois du Cazier’s coalmine in 1956.
- 2002: Au fil de l'Homme (La Louvière - Belgium). Inauguration show of the funicular boat lift of Strépy-Thieu.
- 2004-2016: Festival 5 sur 5 (La Louvière - Belgium). Film festival where international directors make short films about La Louvière.
- 2005: Zarabanda (Brussels - Belgium). Equestrian show of the Brussels International Jumping.
- 2006-2009: Le Tailleur du Rêve (Brussels, Mons - Belgium, Paris - France). Exhibition of drawings, costumes and props of the show “Le Rêve” played in Las Vegas.
- 2006: BelgacomXmas party (Brussels - Belgium). Corporate event for the Belgian company Belgacom.
- 2007: Crown Macau Opening (Macau - China). Opening performance of the Crown Macau hotel.
- 2007: Fortissim'o (Vienna - Austria). Event show performed at the Hofburg Palace in Vienna.
- 2008: Celestial Urban Opera (Bilbao - Spain). Urban Opera made for the city of Bilbao.
- 2008: Le Potager des Visionnaires (Quebec City - Canada). Vegetal type of event on the roof of the Musée de la Civilisation in Quebec City, as part of the 400th anniversary of the city.
- 2008-2009: Cuty Sark Spain (Madrid, Barcelona, Valencia - Spain). 3 corporate events for the whiskey brand.
- 2009: Gare à vous! (Liège - Belgium). Opening performance of the Liège-Guillemins new railway station by world-renowned architect Santiago Calatrava Valls.
- 2009: KDO! (Brussels - Belgium).End of year show played at Forest National.
- 2010: ECOS (Medellín - Colombia). Inauguration of the South American Games.
- 2010: Zain (Azores - Portugal). Show celebrating the “Seven Natural Wonders” in Portugal.
- 2011: Venice (Venice - Italy). Private ceremony.
- 2012: Odyseo (Brussels - Belgium). Video show celebrating the 150th anniversary of the Belgian company Solvay.
- 2013: Story of a Fort, Legacy of a Nation (Abu Dhabi - UAE). Visual poem created for the Qasr Al Hosn Festival in honor of Bedouin culture.
- 2014: FIFA World Cup (Säo Paulo - Brazil). Opening and closing ceremonies of the FIFA World Cup.
- 2015: Discovery of a New World (Harbin - China). Winter show, presenting a "New World" to the public of Harbin.
- 2015: Napoli Teatro Festival (Naples - Italy). Franco Dragone directed this edition of the Neapolitan theater festival.
- 2016: Catwalk to Rio (Brussels - Belgium). Gala dinner showcasing the best of Belgium for the Rio 2016 Summer Olympics.
- 2016: Я (Russia and international). Show for the tour of pop singer Philip Kirkorov.
- 2023: Terhal (Riyadh - Saudi Arabia). Terhal was created in collaboration with the Saudi Ministry of Culture. Franco was involved in the initial phases and it was co-directed by Filippo Ferraresi & Tiziana Pagliarulo

=== Ballets and operas ===
- 2013: Sorolla (Madrid - Spain). Production performed by the Spanish National Ballet and inspired by the paintings of Joaquin Sorolla.
- 2013-2017: Aida (Naples- Italy, Antwerp, Brussels - Belgium). Opera performed in 2013 at the San Carlo Theater in Italy and in 2017 in Belgium.
- 2016: La Traviata (Jesi - Italy). Franco Dragone directed Giuseppe Verdi’s opera with the Pergolesi Spontini Foundation.
- 2017: The Nutcracker (Brussels - Belgium). The latest adaptation of the famous ballet by Pyotr Ilyich Tchaikovsky staged and choreographed by Giuliano Peparini
