= Scéno Plus =

Montreal-based entertainment design firm

Scéno Plus Inc.
- Founded: February 1985; 40 years ago in Montreal
- Founders: Patrick Bergé; Lorraine Berthiaume
- Headquarters: Montreal, Quebec, Canada
- Website: sceno-plus.com

Scéno Plus Inc., founded in 1985, is a Montreal-based performing arts and entertainment design firm providing a complete range of integrated specialized services. It specializes in the design of cultural and recreational venues such as multidisciplinary spaces, small creative studios, circus theatres, concert halls, large-capacity theatres, cinemas, convention centres, event centres and multipurpose halls.

== History ==
Patrick Bergé, Scéno Plus’ cofounder and president of the board, grew up in a theatre environment. At age of 13, he started working in a theatre and toured with artists until he was 19 years old. He decided to focus on theatre projects when he later went to architectural school. Patrick Bergé and Lorraine Berthiaume founded Scéno Plus Inc. in February 1985 and concentrated their efforts in designing aesthetic and functional theatres to enhance performer, technician and venue manager work conditions.

The firm is now headed by Patrick and Lorraine's two sons: Olivier and Vincent Berthiaume-Bergé.

== Realizations ==
Scéno Plus past realizations include among others venues like the two first permanent Cirque du Soleil theaters in Las Vegas: the Mystère Theater at Treasure Island and the O Theater at Bellagio as well as the Cirque du Soleil Theatre that hosts Drawn to Life (and previously La Nouba) at Disney Springs in Walt Disney World. The firm also designed The Colosseum at Caesars Palace for the Celine Dion mega production A New Day and created the Wynn Theater that hosted the show Le Rêve at Wynn Las Vegas.

The firm also designed the rock concert facility The Joint at Hard Rock Hotel & Casino in Las Vegas and the transformable showroom called The Venue at the Horseshoe Casino located in Hammond.

== Awards ==
Recently, Pollstar magazine selected the rock concert venue The Joint in Las Vegas as the Best New Major Concert Venue in 2009. In 2003, the Civic trust Commendation granted the Dream Factory at the Playbox Theatre in Warwick, United Kingdom for its high design standards. Scéno Plus also received in 2002 the Outstanding Private Building Award for The Colosseum at Caesars Palace in Las Vegas by the Southwest Contractor Magazine.
