= Celine in Las Vegas, Opening Night Live =

- Starring: Celine Dion; Justin Timberlake
- Country of origin: United States
- No. of episodes: 1

Production
- Running time: 44 mins (w/o commercial breaks)

Original release
- Network: CBS
- Release: 25 March 2003

Celine in Las Vegas: Opening Night Live is a one-off American television special by Canadian singer Celine Dion that was broadcast by CBS on 25 March 2003. It was recorded the same day at the 4,000-seat Colosseum at Caesars Palace in Las Vegas, Nevada. Hosted by Justin Timberlake, the special celebrated the Opening Night performance of Dion's first Las Vegas residency, A New Day..., which initially ran for three years and was later extended for an additional two years. It also served as promotion for Dion's studio album One Heart. The broadcast included eight performances from the original setlist of A New Day... and incorporated backstage footage and a behind-the-scenes segment on the creation of the show.

The full production was later filmed for the Live in Las Vegas: A New Day... DVD and Blu-ray, released in 2007 during the show's fifth and final year. The special received a nomination for a Primetime Emmy Award for Outstanding Choreography.

== Set list ==
1. "The Power of Love"
2. "I'm Alive"
3. "I've Got the World on a String"
4. "The First Time Ever I Saw Your Face"
5. "I Wish"
6. "I Drove All Night"
7. "What a Wonderful World"
8. "Love Can Move Mountains"

Dion also performed "Have You Ever Been in Love", which was aired on the Today show.
