= Elijah Brown =

Canadian dancer and a performer

Elijah Brown is a Canadian dancer and a performer. He is known for his work with Celine Dion, Franco Dragone, Marie Chouinard, and Louise Lecavalier. In 2007 he wrote a song with Claude Mego Lemay, the musical director of Celine Dion, that was chosen out of 100,000 entries to be performed at the 2008 Beijing Olympic Games.

== Career ==
He is best known for his performance alongside Celine Dion as the lead character in the top grossing entertainment show A New Day... created by director Franco Dragone. Elijah also premiered in an hour long solo titled "Des Feux Dans la Nuit" at the Burgtheater in Vienna, Austria. This solo was created specifically for him by the famous choreographer Marie Chouinard. Elijah has also been touring Europe and Canada with A Few Minutes of Lock, a duet between him and dancer Louise Lecavalier. The work was created by choreographer Edouard Lock and music by Iggy Pop. Elijah graduated Valedictorian from Ryerson Theatre School after studying in the Theatre and Dance programs. He went on to do productions with the Canadian Opera Company, West Side Story and was seen in many of Michael Downing's early films. He was Wally's neighbor in The Kids in the Hall movie Brain Candy before touring internationally with Company Marie Chouinard. Elijah is currently working with director Francois Girard and is involved in the Cirque du Soleil show Zarkana
