= Luc Petit =

Artistic director

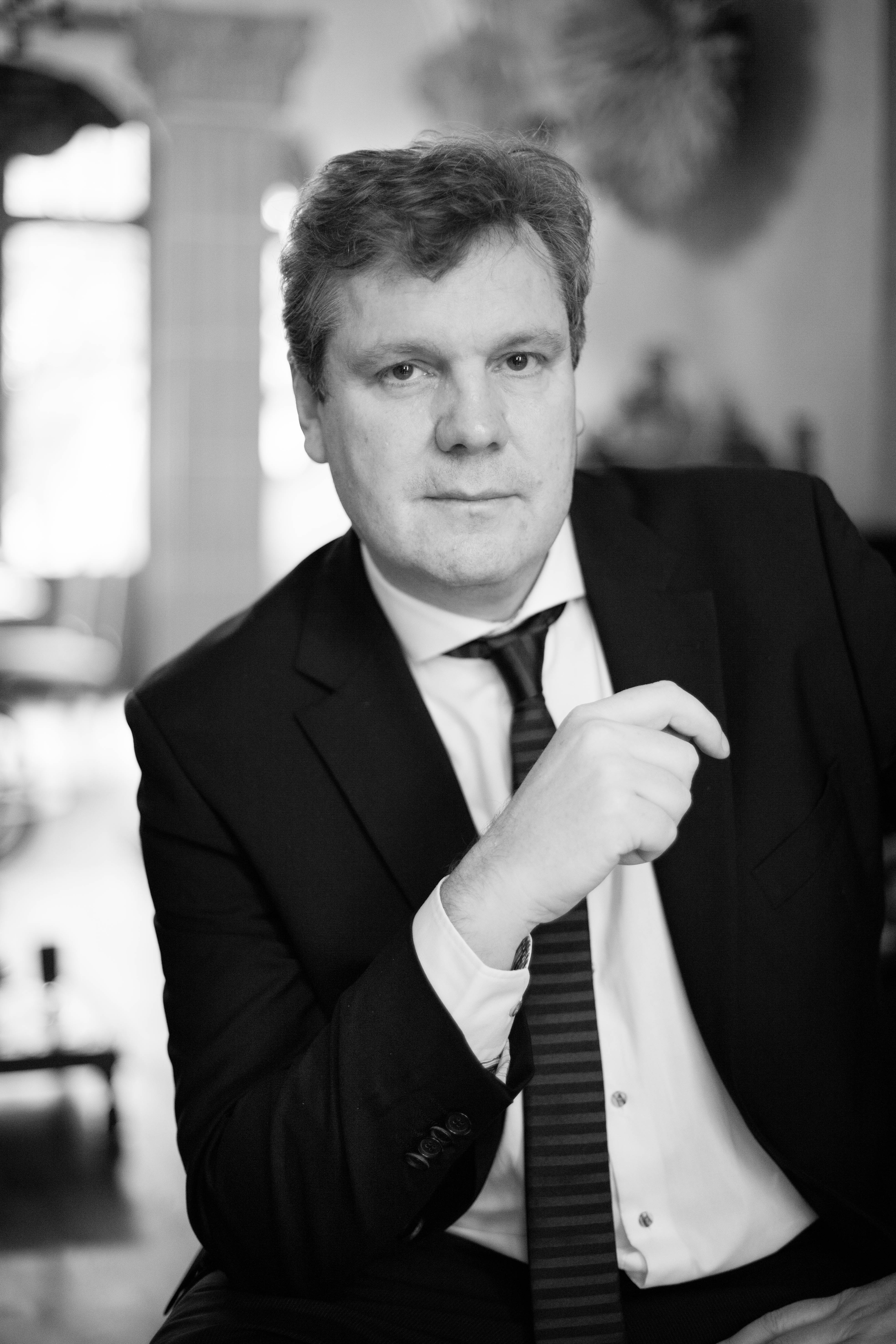
Luc Petit, creative director

Luc Petit (born 1962) is an artistic director, designer and creator of shows, events, exhibitions and museum spaces. He's mostly known for his shows in remarquable places such as cathedrals, castles, monuments and more like "Viser la lune" in the streets of La Louvière, Inferno on waterloo's battlefield or even the Noël des Cathédrales tour each years in Belgian's cathedrals.

== Early life ==
He began his training in television directing. He studied cinematography at the IAD in Louvain-la-Neuve.

== Art ==
After his academic training, he began to work at No Télé (a local television station in Tournai). During this audiovisual involvement he met Jean Michel Jarre, Jean Rochefort and Gérard Depardieu.

Luc Petit has collaborated with organisations in the entertainment and event industry including the festival "Juste pour Rire", Cirque du Soleil, Jean-Paul Gaultier and Disney.

He worked for Franco Dragone for many years, working on productions including Décrocher la lune, the Disney Cinema Parade, and the opening ceremony of EuroFoot 2000 in Brussels. In 2012, Luc Petit and his team conceptualized the musical, inspired by the story of Peter Pan, mixing dance, singing, acrobatics, lighting effects and videos. This show was the biggest video mapping show for arenas. He toured in Europe, Dubai and Singapore.

In 2014, he created Texas Aggies go to war, celebrating the 70th anniversary of the Battle of the Bulge. The show, was awarded the Trophée de l'Evénement Exceptionnel in Cannes.

In 2015, he designed and directed Inferno, a show made for the opening ceremony of the bicentenary of the Battle of Waterloo prior to a reenactment of the battle, for which he received the "Best Creative Director" award at the EuBEA Festival in Sevilla. The celebration events in Waterloo, made in collaboration with Vo Communication and Verhulst&Partners, were also given the Best cultural event award, the best public event and the European best event award 2015.

A couple of months later, he directed the biggest urban opera in the world, Décrocher la Lune, in La Louvière, Belgium. For this, he was awarded at the BEA Festival with a Silver Award. He also received at the EUBEA Festival the golden award for Best Cultural Event and Best Ceremony Event, a silver award for the Best European Event 2016 and a bronze award for Luc Petit CREATION as an event agency. In April 2017, he received an award for the Best show in the category "Live Event Spectacular on a Limited Budget" at the Themed Entertainment Association gala.

He is internationally known and developing different projects for Wanda Group Entertainment in China but also with other companies. He has collaborated multiple times with the Belgian studio Dirty Monitor in the 3D mapping field.

Since July 2018, visitors of the “Caves of Han” can visit permanent installation ORIGIN, an underground show including sound, light, video mapping technology, and lasers.

Moreover, since 2015, Luc Petit and his international team have worked on a permanent show in Qingdao, China, the Qing Show. The grand premiere in April 2019 featured a production directed by Luc Petit based on the Chinese legend of the Eight Immortals.

Together with Michel Teheux, he created a non-profit organization Les Nocturnales, a new concept of heritage operas, which highlight the architectural wealth of cathedrals and patrimonial buildings.

In 2021, Luc Petit, Michel Teheux and more than 50 artists and technicians organized a symbolic gesture on Saturday March 13 to revive scenic arts after a year of shutdown due to the health crisis. In July, Luc Petit settles in the city of Namur for his new show as part of the Folkloriales before repeating in the city of Bastogne.

Not long after, Luc Petit and his team perform a series of shows, particularly in the city of Beloeil where he revisits the Little Red Riding Hood from Perrault and the Grimm brothers in the castle's park during two weeks. When summer comes around, he offers a new creation specific to its concept of heritage opera in Modave, for the first time.

At the dawn of 2022, Luc Petit wanted to reconnect with his series "The Christmas of the Cathedrals" by presenting a new show in Tournai and Lille: Le Combat des Anges, the new wave of covid-19 will however force him to cancel the tour following the new governmental measures. Therefore, 80 performances will never see the light of day. Luc Petit will appeal to the government following these forced cancellations and a symbolic show will still be played.

In August 2022, the Belgian show director reclaims the Beloeil's Castle's park with the show Pinocchio. A revisit of the famous tale of Carlo Collodi, with more than 60 actors across 9 scenes, spread over more than a kilometer's course. A show of 40 performances for a total of more than 17,000 spectators.

In September 2022, Luc Petit is rewarded for his work of restoration of the heritage by the Walloon Federal Government which raises him to the title of Knight of Walloon Merit during the festivities of Wallonia 2022.

The end of 2022 and the dawn of 2023 witness, once again, the tour "The Christmas of the Cathedrals". This time, two shows are presented simultaneously : Le Combat des Anges and Le Sablier de Noël. This tour will pass, among others, by the cities of Lille, Brussels and Namur.

In March 2023, Luc Petit introduces his new show Le Carnaval des Animaux in Liège. With Luc Petit as show director and Bruno Coppens as scenarist, this show demonstrates a technical challenge : the suspension of a giant mirror allowing the reflection of images projected on the ground. This show brings together more than 20 dancers and 130 costumes as well as the Royal Philharmonic Orchestra of Liège – co-producer of the show.

To celebrate the 800 years of the presentation of the Charter of Freedoms, Luc Petit stages the folklore of the city of Wavre: "Le Jeu de Jean et Alice". Through a mapping created specially for the event, more than 400 volunteers and artists bring this show to life on Place Cardinal Mercier.

Summer 2023 marks the return of the annual Beloeil's Castle show. This time, Luc Petit stages his vision of the tale Peter Pan. It is a multi-disciplinary ambulatory show that brings together more than a hundred artists and 23,000 spectators in 57 representations.

Produced by 'Avant que L'Ombre' and staged by Luc Petit, La Nuit des dragons took spectators on a journey through the fiery and legendary world of dragons within the Rixensart's Castle.

The year 2023 was also closed by the tour "Christmas of the Cathedrals". This time, the new creation of Luc Petit, L'Arche de Noël will be performed in the cathedrals and churches of three Belgian cities: the Church of Saint-Martin d'Arlon, the Cathedral of Saint-Paul of Liège and the Cathedral of Notre-Dame of Tournai.

The beginning of 2024 will mark the great return of the Carnival of Animals, this time at the Cirque Royal of Brussels from 7 to 10 March.

== Shows ==
- Euro 2000 (show director).
- Décrocher la lune 1 (La Louvière, Belgium) (show director).
- Chapeau Europa.
- Disney Cinema Parade.
- Décrocher la lune 2 (La Louvière, Belgium) (show director).
- Au fil de l'homme
- Zarabanda
- Bois du Cazier
- Décrocher la lune 3 (La Louvière, Belgium) (show director).
- Les Imaginaires: Waremme (show director)
- Belgacom Xmas party
- Crown Macau opening.
- Fortissim'o
- Défilé Les Petits Riens.
- Natan
- Les Nocturnales de Noël: Dites-moi les Anges (show director).
- Mobistar.
- Nespresso Lattissima
- Bilbao Celestial urban opera
- Le Grand Charivari
- Plaisirs d'hiver.
- Belgacom Phi
- Les Nocturnales de Noël: Et le Ciel rêva de la Terre
- Nespresso Citiz
- Thalys
- Défilé Mais il est où le Soleil ? 10 ans (show director).
- Jardins de feu (show director).
- Nespresso Avenches
- Juste pour Rire: Le Monde de Victor
- Besix 100 ans.
- Le Grand Baiser.
- Décrocher la lune 4 (La Louvière, Belgium) (show director).
- Orange
- Expo Cédric
- Les Nocturnales de Noël : Quand le Ciel et la Terre s'embrassèrent (show director)
- Les Imaginaires : Pour que les pierres deviennent feu
- Fashion show : Mais il est où le soleil?
- Amway 15 years
- Juste pour rire : Pink Cendrillon & Le Grand Bisou
- Les Nocturnales de Noël : Les Carillons du Ciel (show director)
- Fashion show: Mais il est où le soleil? (show director)
- Metinvest 5 years
- Juste pour Rire: Pinkarnaval
- Telenet : 15e anniversaire
- Besix: 100 years
- Doha
- Les Nocturnales, Huy
- Amway
- Décrocher la lune 5 (La Louvière, Belgium) (show director),.
- Peter Pan (Conceptor & Show Director).
- Story of a Fort: Legacy of a Nation (show director).
- Juste Pour Rire: Terra Karnaval & Le Grand Bisou
- Private birthday in Roma at Cinecittà (conceptor and show director)
- Texas Aggies Go to War, a commemorating show in the Mardasson (show director)
- Discovery of a new world, Harbin China for Wanda Group (show director).
- Inferno, the opening show of the bicentenary of the Waterloo's battle. (show director)
- Décrocher la lune 6, La Louvière, Belgium (show director).
- Les Sonneurs de Noël : heritage opera in Wallonie tour & Brussels - Belgium / Lille - France
- Origin : spectacle son et lumière permanent aux Grottes de Han
- Les Féeries de Beloeil 1st edition : heritage opera in the Castle of Beloeil - Belgium.
- Le Voyage des Mages : heritage opera in Wallonie tour & Brussels - Belgium
- Qing Show : permanent show in Qingdao - China
- Les Féeries de Beloeil 2^{e} édition : heritage opera in the Castle of Beloeil - Belgium.
- Les Routes de la Liberté : commemoration show in Bastogne - Belgium
- L'Horloger de Noël : heritage opera in Wallonie tour - Belgium
- Tournai d'été : opéra patrimonial - Belgium
- Les Folkloriales de Namur : heritage opera - Belgium
- Le Petit Chaperon Rouge : heritage opera - Belgium
- De Modave à Versailles : heritage opera - Belgium
- Les Folkloriales de Bastogne : heritage opera - Belgium
- Noël des Cathédrales : Le Combat des Anges : heritage opera - France (Lille) et Belgium (Tournai)
- Noël des Cathédrales : Le Sablier de Noël : heritage opera - Belgique
- Pinocchio : opéra patrimonial - Beloeil - Belgium
- Le Carnaval des Animaux - Liège - Belgium
- Le Jeu de Jean et Alice - Wavre - Belgium
- Peter Pan - Beloeil - Belgium
- La Nuit des Dragons - Rixensart - Belgium
- L'Arche de Noël - opéra patrimonial en tournée en Wallonie - Belgium
- Le Carnaval des Animaux - Brussels - Belgium

== Bibliography ==
- (in French) Yves Vasseur, Franco Dragone: une part de rêve, Éd. Luc Pire, 2006, P144 (ISBN 2-87415-653-1)
- (in French) Musée de l'orfèvrerie de la fédération Wallonie-Bruxelles, Faste et Intimité, Une exposition sensorielle dans les coulisses du XVIIIe siècle (ISBN 978-2-9600403-9-5)
- (in French) Muriel Chapuis, Les carnets d'événements, 2013, P70, Sous l'inspiration de ... Luc PETIT
- (in French) Building Experience, 1990–2009, Ed. Yin books, Volume 2, P 282–291
