= Live in Las Vegas: A New Day... =

Video by Celine Dion
- Released: 7 December 2007
- Recorded: 17–21 January 2007
- Venue: The Colosseum at Caesars Palace (Las Vegas)
- Genre: Pop
- Length: 93:00
- Languages: English; French; Italian
- Labels: Columbia; Epic
- Directors: Jean Lamoureux (concert); Stéphane Laporte (bonus material)
- Producer: Julie Snyder

Celine Dion chronology
On ne change pas (2005)	Live in Las Vegas: A New Day... (2007)	Céline sur les Plaines (2008)

Live in Las Vegas: A New Day... is the eighth home video by Canadian singer Celine Dion, documenting her Las Vegas residency show A New Day... at The Colosseum at Caesars Palace. The DVD was released in Europe between 7 and 10 December 2007, in North America on 11 December 2007, in Australia on 15 December 2007, and in Japan on 19 December 2007. A Blu-ray edition followed in February 2008.

The release presents the final version of the show, recorded in January 2007, and includes more than five hours of supplementary material, including documentaries, backstage footage, and fan tributes. Live in Las Vegas: A New Day... topped music DVD charts in numerous countries and received multiple certifications, among them triple diamond in Canada and diamond in France.

== Background ==
A New Day... concluded on 15 December 2007 after a five‑year residency at The Colosseum at Caesars Palace in Las Vegas. Over the course of its run, the production was performed more than 700 times and attended by over three million spectators, generating an estimated US$400 million.

The DVD contains the final version of the show as performed in late 2006 and 2007. The two‑disc set includes more than five hours of additional content, including the documentaries Because You Loved Me (A Tribute to the Fans), A New Day: All Access, and A New Day: The Secrets. The package also includes multilingual subtitles and a booklet with photographs and liner notes.

== History ==
The show was first filmed in 2003 for the CBS television special Celine in Las Vegas, Opening Night Live, which aired on 25 March 2003 and presented eight performances from the original setlist along with backstage footage hosted by Justin Timberlake.

An initial DVD release was planned for 2004 using material recorded between 26 and 30 November 2003. This early version included songs such as "Nature Boy", "At Last", "Fever", "The First Time Ever I Saw Your Face", "Et je t'aime encore", "Have You Ever Been in Love", and "What a Wonderful World". The release was postponed due to substantial changes made to the production.

The show was re‑shot in high definition between 17 and 21 January 2007. According to the documentary A New Day: The Secrets, one reason for the new recording was that Dion's short blonde hairstyle from the earlier filming was considered visually unsuitable on screen; she returned to a long brunette style for the 2007 shoot.

Throughout the residency, Dion performed several songs that did not appear on the final DVD or CD releases, including "Happy Xmas (War Is Over)", "God Bless America", "In Some Small Way", "Taking Chances", "The Christmas Song", and "Can't Help Falling in Love". Some performances were included in television specials but were not officially released.

Several tracks from the early 2003 recordings — "Nature Boy", "At Last", "Fever", "Et je t'aime encore", and "What a Wonderful World" — were later included on the live album A New Day... Live in Las Vegas (2004).

== Promotion ==
Performances of "The Power of Love", "I Drove All Night", "I Surrender", and "I Wish" included on the DVD were first issued on the deluxe edition of Dion's album Taking Chances in November 2007.

A New Day... was broadcast in multiple territories, including the Netherlands (18 and 25 November 2007 on SBS6), Spain (29 November 2007 on TVE2), South Africa (2 and 8 December 2007 on SABC 3), Italy (25 December 2007 on Italia 1), and Quebec (20 and 27 January 2008 on TVA).

The show also received limited theatrical screenings, among them Poland (at Multikino on 5 December 2007) and the United States (various theatres on 17 December 2007).

On 16 December 2007, the Quebec network TVA aired a special dedicated to Dion's final performance at The Colosseum. Titled Les Adieux de Céline Dion à Las Vegas, it included backstage footage of Dion and René Angélil during the closing night.

== Commercial performance ==
According to Quebec media, Live in Las Vegas: A New Day... sold out across the province within hours of release. On 18 January 2008, it became the first music DVD in Canadian history to receive a triple diamond certification, with sales exceeding 300,000 units. It also achieved the largest debut in Nielsen SoundScan history for a DVD‑only title, selling more than 70,000 copies in its first week. It remained at number one on the Canadian Music DVD chart for several weeks.

Internationally, the DVD reached number one in the United States, United Kingdom, France, Japan, Switzerland, the Netherlands, Belgium, Denmark, New Zealand, and Estonia, and placed within the top 10 in numerous additional markets.

Nearly 500,000 copies were sold worldwide during the first week. The release was certified triple diamond in Canada, diamond in France, four times platinum in Australia, platinum in the United Kingdom, Brazil, Portugal, Argentina, and New Zealand, and gold in the Netherlands and Belgium. In Japan, it sold 30,000 copies within its first three months.

In the United States, the RIAA certified the double‑DVD seven times platinum. As of 2 September 2012, it had sold 463,186 copies and was eligible for nine times platinum certification. According to Billboard, it was the third best‑selling music DVD of 2008 in the United States and the top‑selling release by a female artist. It was also the 10th best‑selling music DVD in the country in 2009.

== Accolades ==
In 2009, the DVD was nominated for the Juno Award for Music DVD of the Year.

== Track listing ==
Live in Las Vegas: A New Day... – the concert (disc one)
No.	Title	Writer(s)	Length
1.	"A New Day Has Come"	Aldo Nova; Stephan Moccio	4:35
2.	"The Power of Love"	Gunther Mende; Candy DeRouge; Jennifer Rush; Mary Susan Applegate	3:45
3.	"It's All Coming Back to Me Now"	Jim Steinman	3:36
4.	"Because You Loved Me"	Diane Warren	2:09
5.	"To Love You More"	David Foster; Junior Miles	4:54
6.	"I'm Alive"	Kristian Lundin; Andreas Carlsson	3:34
7.	"I Drove All Night"	Billy Steinberg; Tom Kelly	4:31
8.	"Seduces Me"	Dan Hill; John Sheard	7:51
9.	"If I Could"	Ron Miller; Ken Hirsch; Marti Sharron	5:54
10.	"Pour que tu m'aimes encore"	Jean-Jacques Goldman	4:22
11.	"I Surrender"	Louis Biancaniello; Sam Watters	5:12
12.	"Ammore annascunnuto"	Bruno Coulais; Philippe Fragione; Mario Castiglia	5:07
13.	"All the Way"	Jimmy Van Heusen; Sammy Cahn	4:20
14.	"I've Got the World on a String"	Ted Koehler; Harold Arlen	2:26
15.	"I Wish"	Stevie Wonder	4:13
16.	"Love Can Move Mountains"	Warren	6:06
17.	"River Deep – Mountain High"	Ellie Greenwich; Jeff Barry; Phil Spector	4:52
18.	"My Heart Will Go On"	James Horner; Will Jennings	15:32
Total length:			93:00

Live in Las Vegas: A New Day... – bonus feature (disc one)
No.	Title	Length
1.	"Because You Loved Me: A Tribute to the Fans"	41:00
Total length:		134:00

Live in Las Vegas: A New Day... – special and bonus features (disc two)
No.	Title	Length
1.	"A New Day: All Access" (special feature)	120:00
2.	"A New Day: The Secrets" (bonus feature)	53:00
Total length:		173:00

== Charts ==
=== Weekly charts ===
Weekly video chart performance
DVD chart (2007–2008)	Peak position
Argentine Music DVD (CAPIF)	3
Australian Music DVD (ARIA)	3
Austrian Music DVD (Ö3 Austria)	4
Belgian Music DVD (Ultratop Flanders)	1
Belgian Music DVD (Ultratop Wallonia)	1
Canadian Music DVD (Nielsen SoundScan)	1
Czech Republic Music DVD (ČNS IFPI)	7
Danish Music DVD (Hitlisten)	1
Dutch Music DVD (MegaCharts)	1
Estonian Music DVD (IFPI)	1
French Music DVD (SNEP)	1
Greek Music DVD (IFPI Greece)	3
Hungarian Music DVD (MAHASZ)	17
Irish Music DVD (IRMA)	3
Italian Music DVD (FIMI)	6
Japanese Music DVD (Oricon)	4
Japanese International Music DVD (Oricon)	1
New Zealand Music DVD (RMNZ)	1
Portuguese Music DVD (AFP)	2
Spanish Music DVD (Promusicae)	12
Swedish Music DVD (Sverigetopplistan)	2
Swiss Music DVD (Schweizer Hitparade)	1
UK Music Videos (Official Charts)	1
US Music Video Sales (Billboard)	1

Weekly album chart performance
Albums chart (2007)	Peak position
German Albums (Offizielle Top 100)	64
Swiss Albums (Schweizer Hitparade)	56

=== Year-end charts ===
2007 year-end chart performance
Chart (2007)	Position
Australian Music DVD (ARIA)	36
Belgian Music DVD (Ultratop Wallonia)	22
Dutch Music DVD (MegaCharts)	22
French Music DVD (SNEP)	5
Swedish Music DVD (Sverigetopplistan)	81

2008 year-end chart performance
Chart (2008)	Position
Australian Music DVD (ARIA)	8
Belgian Music DVD (Ultratop Flanders)	1
Belgian Music DVD (Ultratop Wallonia)	2
Dutch Music DVD (MegaCharts)	5
French Music DVD (SNEP)	3
Swedish Music DVD (Sverigetopplistan)	15
US Music Videos (Billboard)	3

2009 year-end chart performance
Chart (2009)	Position
Dutch Music DVD (MegaCharts)	16
French Music DVD (SNEP)	71
Swedish Music DVD (Sverigetopplistan)	43
US Music Videos (Billboard)	10

2010 year-end chart performance
Chart (2010)	Position
French Music DVD (SNEP)	51
Swedish Music DVD (Sverigetopplistan)	61

2011 year-end chart performance
Chart (2011)	Position
French Music DVD (SNEP)	36

2012 year-end chart performance
Chart (2012)	Position
French Music DVD (SNEP)	36

== Certifications ==
Certifications
Region	Certification	Certified units/sales
Argentina (CAPIF)	Platinum	8,000^{^}
Australia (ARIA)	4× Platinum	60,000^{^}
Belgium (BRMA)	Gold	25,000^{*}
Brazil (Pro-Música Brasil)	Platinum	30,000^{*}
Canada (Music Canada)	3× Diamond	300,000^{^}
France (SNEP)	Diamond	100,000^{*}
Netherlands (NVPI)	Gold	40,000^{^}
New Zealand (RMNZ)	Platinum	5,000^{^}
Portugal (AFP)	Gold	4,000^{^}
United Kingdom (BPI)	Platinum	50,000^{^}
United States (RIAA)	7× Platinum	463,186
^{*} Sales figures based on certification alone.^{^} Shipments figures based on certification alone.

== Release history ==
Release history
Region	Date	Label	Format	Catalog
Europe	7 December 2007	Columbia	DVD	88697147879 (English); 88697187109 (French)
United States	11 December 2007	Columbia	DVD	13716
Canada	11 December 2007	Columbia	DVD	13716 (English); 87099 (French)
Australia	15 December 2007	Epic	DVD	88697147879
Japan	19 December 2007	Epic	DVD	EIBP-100〜EIBP-101
United States	5 February 2008	Columbia	Blu-ray	13716
Canada	5 February 2008	Columbia	Blu-ray	13716 (English); 87099 (French)
Europe	8 February 2008	Columbia	Blu-ray	88697173379
