= Battle of Waterloo reenactment =

Annual reenactactment of the 1815 Battle of Waterloo

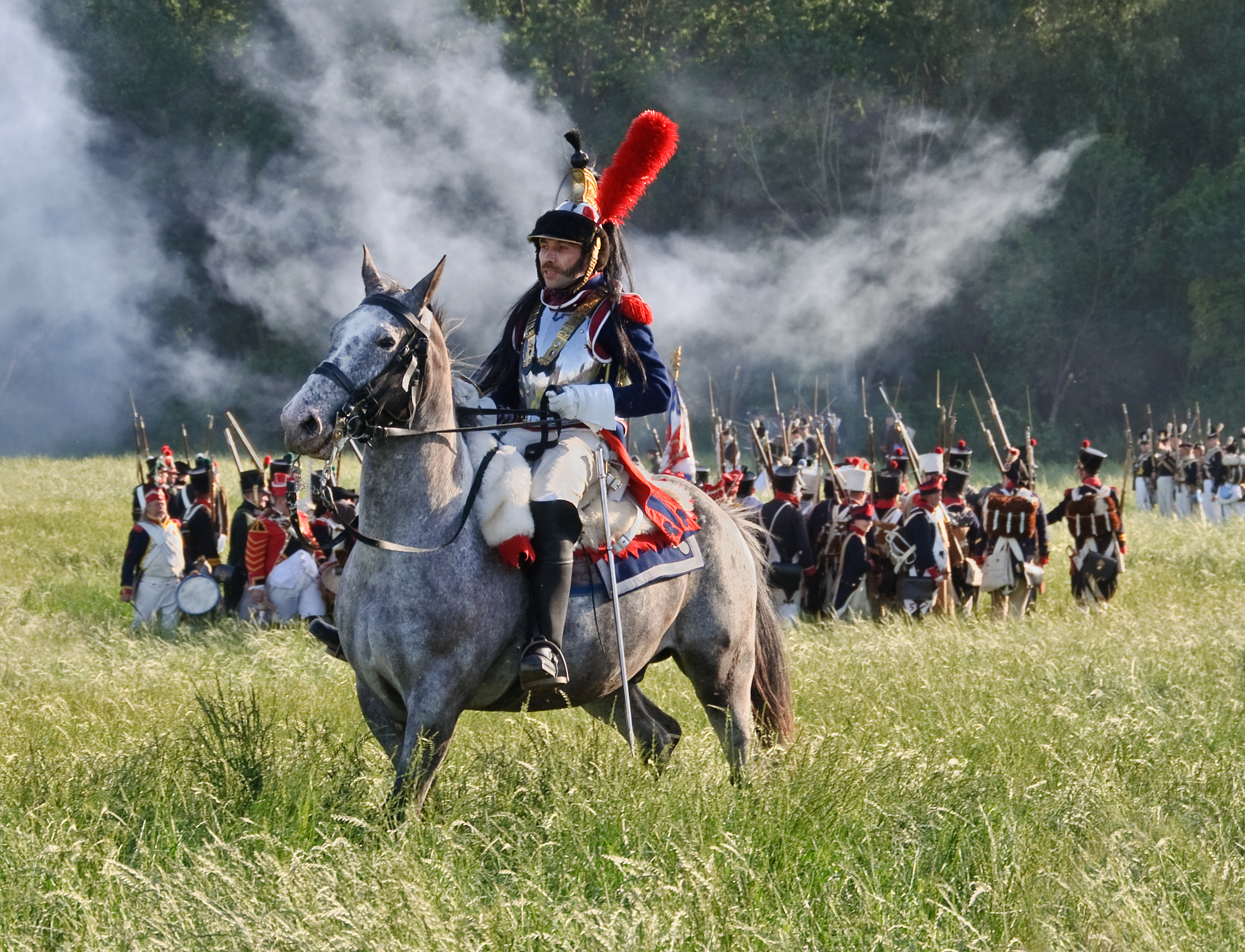
2011

The Battle of Waterloo reenactment is an annual modern recreation of the 19th century Battle of Waterloo on the original battlefield in Waterloo, Belgium.

It is held every June on the weekend nearest to the historic date of the Battle of Waterloo (18 June 1815). In a regular year there will be 600–800 reenactors. The 5-year-anniversaries are greater events with 1,500–2,000 reenactors from France, Belgium, The Netherlands, Great Britain, USA, Germany, Poland, Russia, Sweden, Finland, Spain, Portugal, Argentina, and Chile, among others.

== Waterloo 2015 ==
A major event, one of the largest ever staged, was held on the site of the battle to mark the 200th anniversary of the engagement. 6,200 re-enactors, 330 horses, and 120 cannons took part in actions in an arena area close to La Haye Sainte. During the event, the Allied Army was camped at Hougoumont, with the French camped about a mile away from La Caillou.

The event was opened with a poetic interpretation of the Battle, created by Luc Petit. The show was located on a stage 150 metres long, with giant projector screens, pyrotechnics, dancers, classical musicians and local choirs – in addition to cast members drawn from the re-enactment groups. Three re-enactors were injured by explosives during this production, with one being taken to hospital with serious burns.

== Waterloo 2026 ==
The event was cancelled due to the 2026 European heatwaves.

== Gallery ==
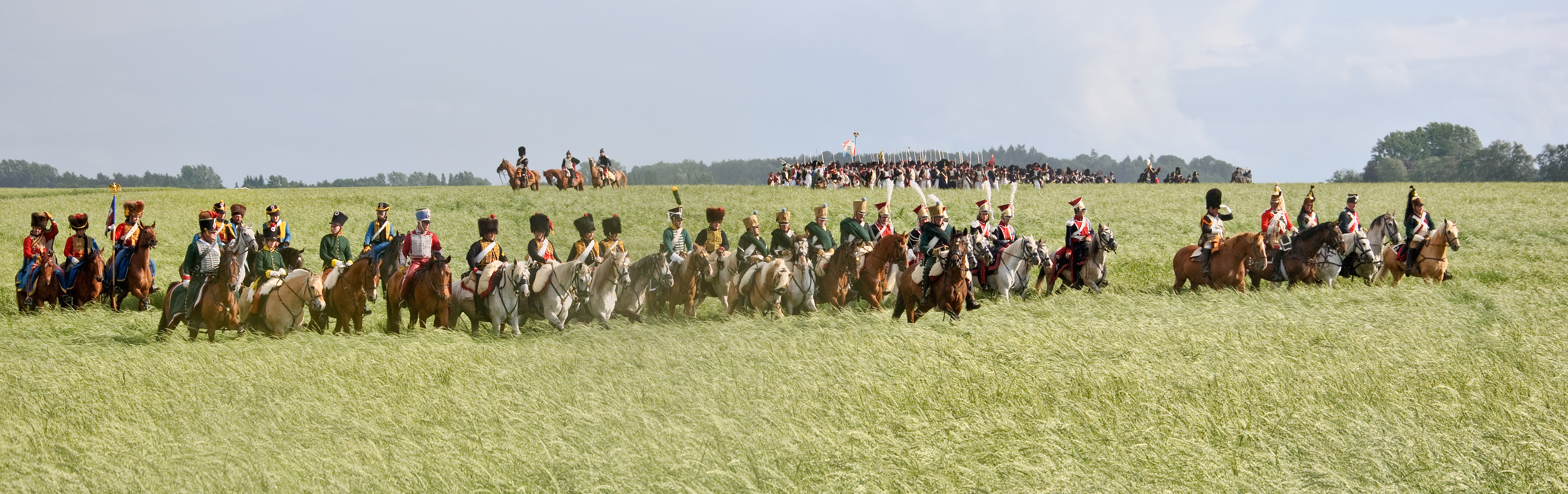
French cavalry, June 2011

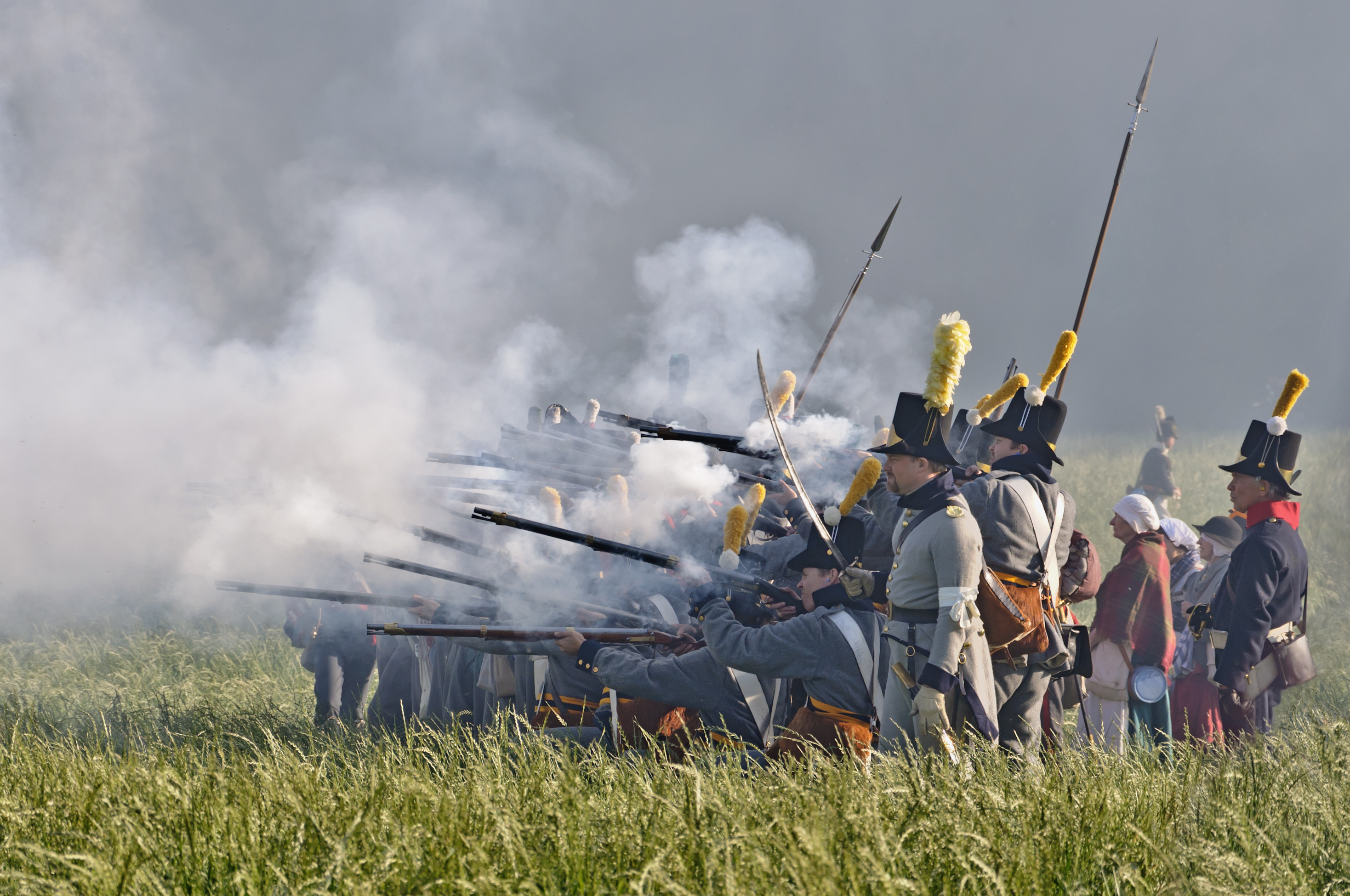
In the 2011 recreation, footsoldiers fire guns

== See also ==
- Waterloo (1970 film)
