= I've Got the World on a String =

1932 jazz song by Harold Arlen and Ted Koehler

Song
- Published: 1932 by Mills Music
- Composer: Harold Arlen
- Lyricist: Ted Koehler

"I've Got the World on a String" is a 1932 popular jazz song composed by Harold Arlen, with lyrics written by Ted Koehler. It was written for the twenty-first edition of the Cotton Club series which opened on October 23, 1932, the first of the Cotton Club Parades.

== Recordings ==
- The song was recorded and popularized by Cab Calloway who had a #18 hit in 1932.
- Bing Crosby recorded the song on January 26, 1933, with the Dorsey Brothers and their Orchestra.
- The song was one of the first recorded by Frank Sinatra when he transferred to Capitol Records in 1953. His recording on April 30, 1953, with an orchestra conducted by Nelson Riddle reached #14 on Billboard's most played list.

== Other notable recordings ==
- Louis Armstrong – (1933) I've Got the World on a String (1957)
- Lee Wiley – "Manhattan Lights" circa 1940
- Ralph Young, with Jack Pleis and His Orchestra (1950)
- Perry Como – So Smooth (1955)
- Frank Sinatra – This is Sinatra! (1956)
- Louis Prima – The Call of the Wildest (1957)
- Ferlin Husky - Sittin' on a Rainbow (1958/01/03)
- Jo Stafford – Jo + Jazz (1960)
- Ella Fitzgerald – Ella in Hollywood (1960), Ella Fitzgerald Sings the Harold Arlen Songbook (1961)
- Rita Reys & the Pim Jacobs Trio - Marriage in Modern Jazz (1960)
- Peggy Lee – Sugar 'n' Spice (1962)
- January Jones – Scopitone video (early 1960s)
- Sarah Vaughan – How Long Has This Been Going On? (1978)
- Frank Sinatra and Liza Minnelli – Duets (1993)
- Diana Krall – Only Trust Your Heart (1995)
- Barry Manilow – Manilow Sings Sinatra (1998)
- Lorrie Morgan – Secret Love (1998)
- James Darren – This One's from the Heart (1999)
- Steve Tyrell – A New Standard (1999)
- Bobby Caldwell - Come Rain or Come Shine (1999)
- Tony Bennett with Diana Krall – Duets: An American Classic (2006)
- Michael Bublé – Call Me Irresponsible (2007)
- Kermit Ruffins – Live At Vaughan's (2007)
- Rod Stewart – Fly Me to the Moon... The Great American Songbook Volume V (2010)
- Jermaine Jackson – I Wish You Love (2012)
- Dr. John – Ske-Dat-De-Dat: The Spirit of Satch (2014)
- Tony Bennett and Diana Krall – Spotify Singles (2019)
- Lady Gaga – Harlequin (2024)

== Live performances ==
- A rendition by Anthony Perkins in the drama Winter Dream, a production of the live anthology TV series, Front Row Center
- Céline Dion in her Las Vegas show A New Day..., which ran from 2003 until 2007, as well the DVD: Live in Las Vegas: A New Day... (2004)

== Popular culture ==
- The Polly Bergen Show – Gordon MacRae and Polly Bergen performed the song on her NBC program (February 22, 1958)
