= Franco Dragone =

Belgian theatre director (1952–2022)

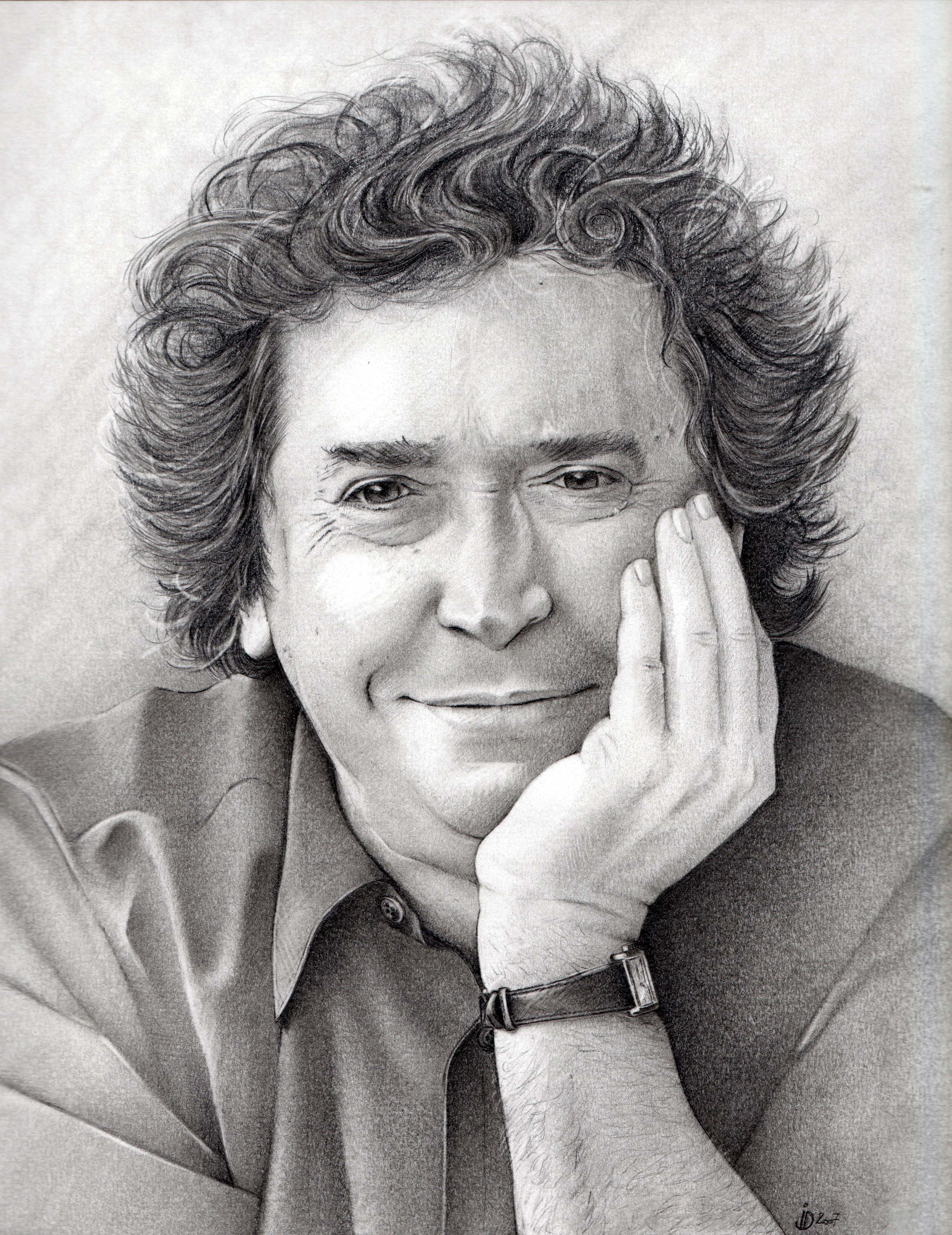
- Born: 12 December 1952; Cairano, Italy
- Died: 30 September 2022 (aged 69); Cairo, Egypt
- Occupations: Founder, artistic director, theatre director
- Website: www.dragone.com

Franco Dragone (12 December 1952 – 30 September 2022) was an Italian-born Belgian theatre director. He was the founder and artistic director of Dragone, a creative company specializing in the creation of large-scale theatre shows. He was also known for his work with Celine Dion. He died from a severe chest infection in Cairo, Egypt, on 30 September 2022 at the age of 69.

== Early life ==
He was born in 1952 in Cairano, a small town in southern Italy. At the age of seven, he moved to the mining region of La Louvière in Belgium with his family so his parents could work in Belgium's coal mines. He remembers that being an "artist" was not treated seriously by the mining community in La Louvière. His father, however, was broad-minded and enrolled him in a liberal lycée. As a student, he was taught a wide range of topics and was allowed to choose his field of interest. He chose the arts.

In the 1970s he studied theatre at the Belgian Royal Conservatory of Mons. Starting his career as an actor in subsidized Belgian art theater, he switched to activist theater, or "theater without actors." His earliest theatrical work was explicitly political, working as a director of theatre and film in the mode of the commedia dell'arte dramatist Dario Fo. The theatre works he helped create expressed social situations, interpreting true stories of the homeless, drug addicts, and prison inmates, and casting non-actors who shared their stories to perform in the shows. In this context Dragone began to teach staging, or visual expression, and came to believe that it was "possible to do high quality shows for mainstream people".

== Cirque du Soleil ==
In the 1980s, he went to Montreal, Canada, in pursuit of "a beautiful girl". There, Guy Caron, director of the National Circus School, invited him to conduct workshops with the students and teachers at his school. Dragone then created, directed and produced a show for the end of the school year. Guy Laliberté saw one of these performances in 1984, the same year he formed Cirque du Soleil. In 1985, Laliberté sought out Guy Caron to join Cirque du Soleil. Caron, in turn, asked Dragone to join as a creator.

From the years 1985 to 1998, Dragone would direct nearly all of Cirque du Soleil's most prestigious shows and played a significant role in developing Cirque du Soleil's distinctive merging of theater and circus performance. In the early 1990s, his reputation grew with the production of Nouvelle Expérience and Saltimbanco, nontraditional circus productions in which postmodern dance, music, and circus acrobatics were interlaced with a dreamlike narrative.

His visibility greatly increased after he directed and introduced the cutting-edge Cirque du Soleil production Mystère at the Treasure Island hotel in Las Vegas, Nevada. Mystère helped to change the nature of production shows in Las Vegas. The only other show he would direct with the company in Las Vegas would be O in 1998. His company said that close to 100 million people around the world have now seen his creations. Dragone directed Cirque du Soleil's first motion picture, Alegría, in 1999. In 1999 Dragone directed the music video for Lara Fabian's song "Adagio".

== Dragone Group ==
In 2000, he amicably split from Cirque du Soleil and formed his own company called the Franco Dragone Entertainment Group (later shortened to "Dragone"), based in his hometown of La Louvière in Belgium. In 2003, Dragone created A New Day... starring Céline Dion at Caesars Palace in Las Vegas. When A New Day ended its run in 2007, Billboard reported it was the highest-grossing residency of all time.

In 2005, he debuted his fourth production on the Las Vegas Strip with the opening of Le Rêve at the Wynn Las Vegas. This show used performers mainly from disciplines related to gymnastics. Like his 1998 show O for Cirque du Soleil, Le Rêve made extensive use of a custom-designed water stage. CNN called it a "bombastic, splashy celebration of life" with "diving feats and stunning special effects".

In 2007, he directed a new musical based on Prosper Mérimée's novella Carmen, which premiered at the La Jolla Playhouse. He also worked on an adaption of the Divine Comedy with composer Ennio Morricone.

He was in charge of the opening ceremony show for the 2010 South American Games in Medellín, Colombia on 19 March 2010.

== Dragone in Macau and Dubai ==
In 2010, building on his previous experience using aquatic stages in O and Le Rêve, he directed a Macau-based show entitled The House of Dancing Water in the City of Dreams. The House of Dancing Water is the largest aquatic production in the world. He developed it in Belgium over 19 months and took five years to build the permanent theater. It premiered on 17 September 2010.

In 2012, his new cabaret Taboo: The Show Naughty and Naughtier premiered at City of Dreams.

On 29 March 2012, he was awarded a doctor honoris causa degree for general merits by the University of Antwerp, in recognition of his innovative and cosmopolitan approach to theatre.

In 2012, Belgian authorities investigated his business group for "serious and organized international tax offenses" and money laundering. The group's offices in La Louvière, as well as his home, the homes of the group's CEO, its CFO, and a former employee, were raided in October 2012 as part of the investigation. The Belgian investigating office suspected Dragone of fraudulently using a global network of shell companies to conceal assets in offshore tax havens to avoid paying taxes. In a press conference addressing the investigation in January 2013, he claimed that the purpose of setting up this international structure had not been to commit fraud, but to avoid double or triple taxation by different countries. He added that he was ready to change his business' structure to provide more transparency. On January 12, 2024, after 12 years of investigations, he was posthumously found not guilty of all charges of fiscal fraud and was completely exonerated. Despite the extensive media coverage during the investigation, the announcement of his exoneration received little attention.

In early 2013, he produced, created and directed Story of a Fort, Legacy of a Nation, a show that ran from 28 February through 9 March 2013 as the centrepiece event of the Qasr al-Hosn festival in Abu Dhabi. The show celebrated Emirati history with technology, acrobatics, and traditional Emirati dance and music.

In 2014, he opened The Han Show in Wuhan, China, celebrating the essence of the Han culture. The Han Show Theater, designed by Mark Fisher and inspired by the traditional red Chinese lantern, is 60 meters high, 100 meters in diameter and houses more than 2000 seats. In spring 2015, he created a new show in Paris for the cabaret Le Lido, titled Paris Merveilles. In March 2016 he confirmed he was working on a new project for Las Vegas. In 2016, he directed a new show featuring Russian pop icon Philipp Kirkorov called Я (Ya, lit. 'I'), which premiered in the Kremlin Palace on 16 March.

In 2017, his show La Perle opened in Al Habtoor City, Dubai, in a custom-made 10-story theater. The show involved waterfalls, fires, motorcyclists spinning inside a suspended metal sphere, acrobatics into water, and other features. Preparing La Perle took Dragone four to five years, and during its first year he "continually tweaked and improved" the show.

By September 2017, around 100 million people had seen Dragone's work.

== Style ==
According to CNN, Cirque du Soleil's signature style was due, in large part, to Dragone's input. He sought to invoke a common language of "emotional archetypes" in his theatrical productions. He said the influence of various painters and the theorist Antonin Artaud pushed him toward a "concrete language intended for the senses", with the use of poetic visuals replacing the poetry of language. He objected to comparisons of his work to Salvador Dalí or Federico Fellini, noting that he traveled frequently and had been influenced by a great many painters. In his search to "make the invisible visible" with his theater, he cited the director Peter Brook as an influence adding, "With time and experience I evolve. I see things differently, so I want my next show to be impacted by these changes. I want every project to be a unique experience for the spectators, and every next project to be a new stage of my own development as an artist."

His shows are typically large in scale. For example La Perle, showcased in a new theater of the same name, his first permanent show in the Middle East, included stunts such as "performers flying across the stage at 15 kilometers an hour before diving from heights of 25 meters into the 860-square-meter pool and seemingly disappearing, only to return from land seconds later." The show aimed to "capture of essence of Dubai" by contrasting opposing elements, such as water and desert, tradition and modernity. It also features traditional pearl diving themes. The show cost $400 million to create with 450 performances held per year. According to CNN, the stage was "an engineering feat, holding a colossal 2.7 million liters of recycled water—enough to fill an Olympic pool—which can be drained in less than a minute for land-based exploits." Regarding the unusually large scale of his productions, Dragone has remarked that "Greek tragedies were done in huge spaces, too."

== Shows ==
=== Cirque du Soleil ===
- 1985: La Magie Continue
- 1987: Le Cirque Réinventé
- 1990: Nouvelle Expérience
- 1992: Saltimbanco
- 1993: Mystère
- 1994: Alegría
- 1996: Quidam
- 1998: O
- 1998: La Nouba
- 1999: Alegría (co-writer, director, producer)

=== Dragone ===
- 1999
  - Music video for Lara Fabian's song "Adagio"
- 2000:
  - Décrocher la lune, La Louvière, directed by Luc Petit
  - Opening ceremony of Euro 2000
- 2001:
  - Chapeau Europa: Ceremony for the European Union Belgian Presidency in Brussels
- 2002:
  - Disney Cinema Parade, for Disneyland Paris
  - Décrocher la lune 2, La Louvière, directed by Luc Petit
  - Au fil de l’homme
- 2003:
  - A New Day..., for Céline Dion
- 2005:
  - Le Rêve, at the Wynn Las Vegas
  - Ma tête est ailleurs, for Saule et les Pleureurs, Mons, Belgium
  - Zarabanda
- 2006:
  - Décrocher la lune 3, La Louvière, directed by Luc Petit
- 2007:
  - Carmen, the Musical, San Diego
  - Othello, passeur, Mons, Belgium
  - Fortissim’O, Vienna
- 2008:
  - Le Potager des visionnaires, Quebec, for the 400th birthday of Quebec City
- 2009:
  - KDO, Brussels
  - Décrocher la lune 4, La Louvière, directed by Luc Petit
- 2010:
  - 2010 South American Games opening show in Medellín, Colombia
  - The House of Dancing Water at City of Dreams, Macau
- 2013:
  - Story of a Fort, Legacy of a Nation, Abu Dhabi
- 2014
  - The Han Show in Wuhan, China
- 2015
  - Paris Merveilles at Le Lido in Paris, France
  - The Dai Show in Xishuangbanna, China
- 2017
  - La Perle at Al Habtoor City, Dubai
  - Я (Ya) for Philipp Kirkorov

=== Other ===
- 1985: La vente aux enchères, Cirque du Trottoir
- 1986: Eldorado, Compagnie des Mutants
- 1987: Les Communs des Mortels, a Compagnie du Campus and Collectif 1984 coproduction
- 1987: Flic, Flac, Compagnie des Funambules (Belgium)
- 1987: La tête dans le si bémol, with Michel Dallaire and Pierre Lafontaine
- 1992: La ballade de l'homme gris, Compagnie du Campus
- 1993: Pomp, Duck, Circumstance, Düsseldorf
- 1996: Poussière du temps, Compagnie du Campus
- 2015: Paris Merveilles, cabaret Lido de Paris
- 2016: Cagnasse tutto, Foja at Teatro di San Carlo, Naples

== Bibliography ==
- (in French) Yves Vasseur, Franco Dragone: une part de rêve, ed. Luc Pire, 2006
- (in French) Yves Vasseur, Franco Dragone, une improbable odyssée, ed. Labor, 2002
- (in French) Franco Dragone, Claude Renard, Le Tailleur du Rêve, ed. Les Impressions Nouvelles, 2006

== Documentaries ==
- (in French) Jacob Berger, Le Rêve, 2005: documentary series for Arte about Franco Dragone's work on the show Le Rêve
- (in French) Manu Bonmariage, Looking For Dragone, 2009
