= The Colosseum at Caesars Palace =

Theater in Las Vegas, Nevada

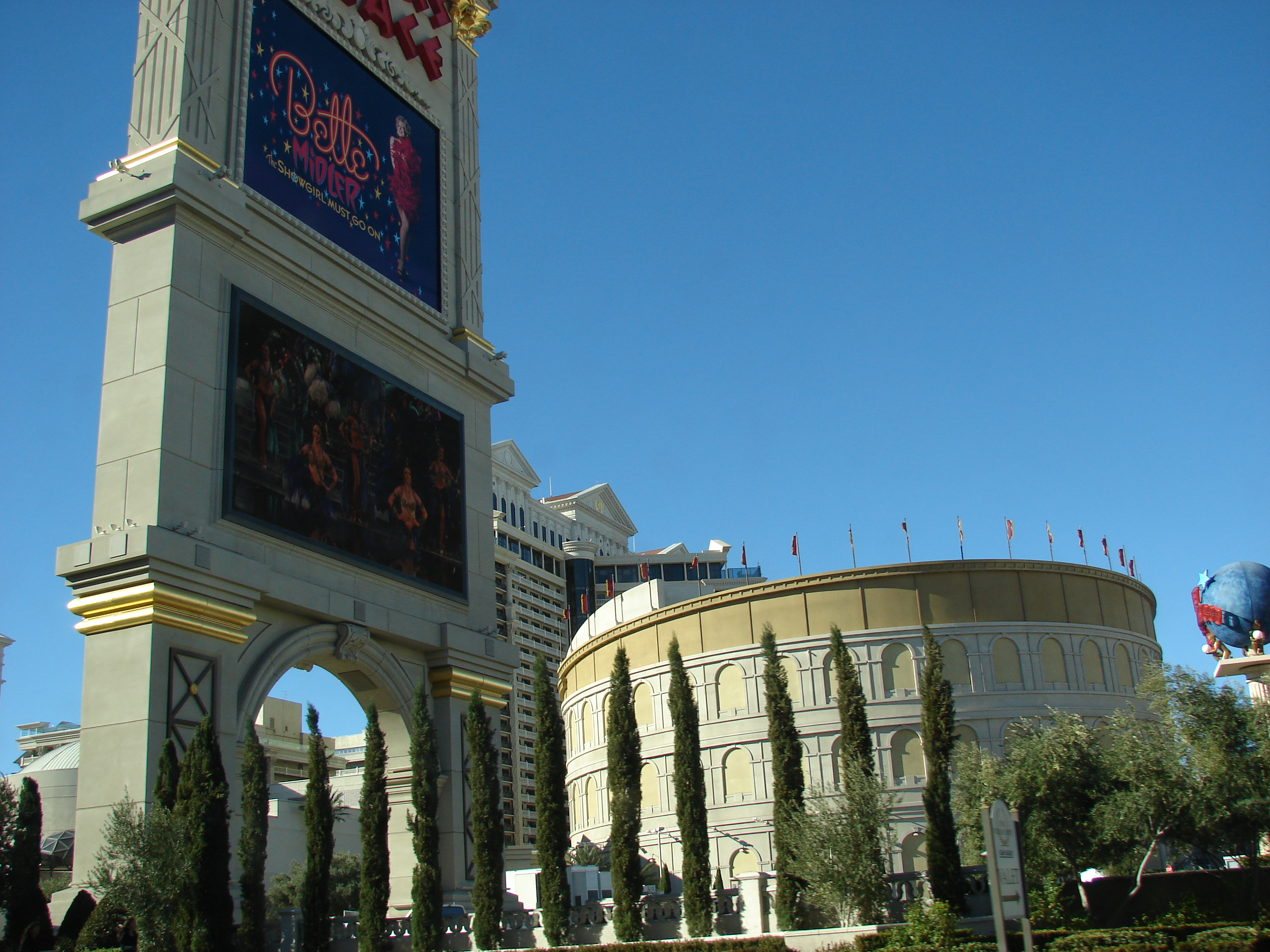
- Exterior of venue in 2007
- Interactive map of The Colosseum at Caesars Palace
- Former names: Caesars Palace Showroom (planning/construction)
- Address: 3570 South Las Vegas Boulevard; Paradise, Nevada 89109-8924, United States
- Location: Caesars Palace, Las Vegas Strip, Paradise
- Coordinates: 36°07′04″N 115°10′30″W
- Owner: Caesars Entertainment
- Operator: Live Nation Entertainment
- Capacity: 4,100

Construction
- Groundbreaking: December 2001
- Opened: March 25, 2003; 23 years ago
- Renovated: July–September 2019
- Cost: $108 million
- Architects: Scéno Plus and GSB, Inc.
- Structural engineer: Kordt Engineering Group
- Services engineer: Global Structural Detailing
- General contractor: Perini Corporation
- Main contractor: Morris-Shea Bridge Company

Website
- thecolosseum.com

The Colosseum at Caesars Palace is a theater located on the Las Vegas Strip in Paradise, Nevada, United States. It is the main entertainment venue for Caesars Palace.

The venue opened in 2003 and has an estimated seating capacity of 4,100 spectators. Its design is inspired by the architecture of ancient Rome along with aspects of contemporary architecture. The cost of the theater was $108 million, becoming the most expensive entertainment venue in Las Vegas at the time, beating the "O" Theater at the Bellagio Las Vegas.

Deemed the Home of the Greatest Entertainers in the World, the Colosseum has hosted numerous concert residencies by Celine Dion, Madonna, Elton John, Reba McEntire, Brooks & Dunn, Usher, Rod Stewart, Cher, Bette Midler, Shania Twain, Mariah Carey, Adele, and Kelly Clarkson. Celine Dion has had the longest residency (1,141 shows as of June 8, 2019) at the venue grossing a total of $650 million since her arrival in 2003. She also performed her record-breaking 1000th show at the venue on October 8, 2016.

== Background ==
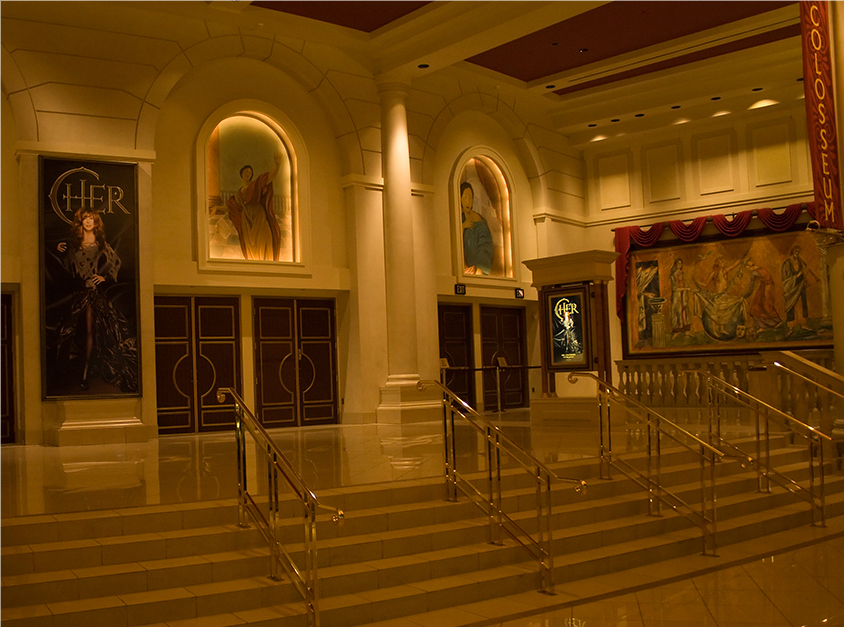
Entrance to theatre from within Caesars Palace in 2008

In 2000, Caesars Palace made plans to renovate the defunct Circus Maximus Showroom (opened 1966) and the special Omnimax Dome (opened 1979). At this time, the owners were approached about a new business venture with Celine Dion. Once the venture was launched, the renovation was cancelled. A new entertainment venue was set to be built in place of the old showroom. In May 2000, the owners made the decision to fully close and prepare the demolitioning of the Omnimax Dome due to recurring issues (which included alleged leaking from the dome-style screen since it opened and aging of the whole auditorium) and to have more area space for the newly planned venue. The showroom closed in September 2000 with a performance by Steve and Eydie. The theatre was built specially to house Celine Dion's "A New Day...".

The construction was initiated by Park Place Entertainment to coincide with other renovations to the hotel complex including additional retail space, meeting areas, restaurants, spas, and a 20-story all-suites hotel tower. The original construction cost was estimated to be between $65 and $75 million. Additional technical aspects drove cost to over $100 million. Both buildings were torn for preparation of construction for the new theater and hotel renovations in early 2001.

The theatre was designed by the world-renowned firm Scéno Plus and constructed by Perini Building Company, with the project beginning in December 2001 and completed on February 4, 2003 (six weeks before its estimated completion date), opening on March 25, 2003. Dion filmed a television special for CBS to showcase the first night of her residency (entitled "Celine in Las Vegas, Opening Night Live", hosted by Justin Timberlake), including behind the scenes look at the theatre and the show.

Since its incarnation, the venue is operated by AEG Live and is currently owned by Caesars Entertainment. The success of Dion's show drew more entertainers to perform at the theatre. Elton John brought his Red Piano show to the theatre from 2004, until 2009. Additional entertainers include Kylie Minogue, Diana Ross, Romina Arena, Faith Hill, Ricky Martin and Luis Miguel. The venue has also hosted numerous comedy shows by Kathy Griffin, Jerry Seinfeld, Chelsea Handler, Dave Chappelle and Ellen DeGeneres. The premiere of the 11th season of Hell's Kitchen was filmed in front of a live audience at The Colosseum.

In 2018, Celine Dion filmed in the venue the music video for her song Ashes from the movie Deadpool 2 alongside Canadian actor Ryan Reynolds.

=== Technical aspects ===
The design for the theatre was based on the ancient Colosseum in Rome. It is connected to the casino near the Forum Shops. The venue is 256 ft (78 m) in diameter with the rotunda 120 ft (37 m) above the floor. The stage measures 22,450 sq ft (2,086 m^{2}) and has a proscenium arch with a height of 45 ft (14 m) and a width of 120 ft (37 m) (one of the world's largest stage openings). It was designed with 180,000 watts of amplification and 139 speakers. It also includes a 120-foot-wide (37 m) by 40-foot-tall (12 m) LED screen manufactured by Mitsubishi Diamond Vision, adding $10 million to the construction budget. The video screen provides the illusion of 3D stage scenery.

The stage itself includes ten motorized stage lifts which compose 75 percent of the stage. Unlike the Colosseum in Rome, the theatre was built in an intimate setting, with the furthest seating being 120 ft (37 m) from the stage. To reinforce its intimacy, the venue is equipped with 200 acoustical panels to control the amplified sound.

== Performance history ==
=== Headliners ===
Performer	Show	Length	Number of shows	Release(s)
Celine Dion	A New Day...	March 25, 2003 – December 15, 2007	717	Celine in Las Vegas, Opening Night Live (CBS Special) (2003); A New Day... Live in Las Vegas (2004); Live in Las Vegas: A New Day... (2007)
Celine Dion	Celine	March 15, 2011 – June 8, 2019	427	Celine: 3 Boys and a New Show (OWN Special)
Elton John	The Red Piano	February 13, 2004 – March 22, 2009	247	Elton John: The Red Piano (NBC Special) (2005); The Red Piano (2009)
Elton John	The Million Dollar Piano	September 28, 2011 – May 17, 2018	197	Elton John: The Million Dollar Piano (Cinema/DVD and Blu-ray) (2014)
Bette Midler	The Showgirl Must Go On	February 20, 2008 – January 31, 2010	170	Bette Midler: The Showgirl Must Go On (HBO Special) (2010); The Showgirl Must Go On (DVD) (2011)
Cher	Cher at the Colosseum	May 6, 2008 – February 5, 2011	192	
Rod Stewart	Rod Stewart: The Hits	August 24, 2011 – November 18, 2023	140	
Shania Twain	Shania: Still the One	December 1, 2012 – December 13, 2014	105	Still the One: Live from Vegas (CD/DVD) (2015)
Reba McEntire and Brooks & Dunn	Together in Vegas	June 19, 2015 – December 15, 2021	95	
Mariah Carey	#1 to Infinity	May 6, 2015 – July 18, 2017	50	
Mariah Carey	The Butterfly Returns	July 5, 2018 - February 29, 2020	25	
Usher	Usher - The Vegas Residency	July 16, 2021 – January 1, 2022	18	
Adele	Weekends with Adele	November 18, 2022 -– November 23, 2024	100	
Garth Brooks	Garth Brooks/Plus One	May 18 – July 13, 2024	45	
The Killers	20 Years of Hot Fuss	August 14, 2024 – January 25, 2025	15	
Kelly Clarkson	Kelly Clarkson: Studio Sessions	July 11, 2025 – August 15, 2026	22	
Def Leppard	Def Leppard: Live at Caesars Palace The Las Vegas Residency	February 3 – 28, 2026	12	
Cyndi Lauper	Cyndi Lauper: Live In Las Vegas	April 24 – May 2, 2026	5	
Lisa	Viva La Lisa	November 12 - 29, 2026	6	

=== Shows ===
Performer	Show	Date
Mariah Carey	Charmbracelet World Tour	July 26, 2003
Mariah Carey	Angels Advocate Tour	February 27, 2010
Mariah Carey	All I Want for Christmas Is You: A Night of Joy and Festivity	December 14–22, 2017; November 22–30, 2019
Gloria Estefan	Live & Unwrapped	October 10–19, 2003
Romina Arena	Romina Arena Live!	June 8–9, 2004
Stevie Nicks	Dreams	May 10–14, 2005; March 20–24, 2007
Stevie Nicks	Gold Dust Tour	July 5, 2005
Stevie Nicks	Stevie Nicks in Concert	May 14, 2011
Faith Hill		August 10–14, 2004
Carole King	The Living Room Tour	August 21, 2004
Luis Miguel	México En La Piel Tour	September 14–16, 2007
Luis Miguel	Cómplices Tour	September 12–15, 2008; September 12–15, 2009
Luis Miguel	Luis Miguel Tour	September 15–18, 2010; September 15–18, 2011
Luis Miguel	The Hits Tour	September 13–15, 2012; September 13–15, 2013
Luis Miguel	Deja Vu Tour	September 12–15, 2014
Luis Miguel	México Por Siempre Tour	September 13–14, 2018; September 12–13, 15–16, 2019
Luis Miguel	Luis Miguel Tour 2023–24	September 12, 14–15, 2024
Bob Dylan	Never Ending Tour	August 17, 2010
Rod Stewart		November 6–21, 2010
Diana Ross	More Today Than Yesterday: The Greatest Hits Tour	November 12–13, 2010
Diana Ross	In the Name of Love Tour	September 19, 2014
Leonard Cohen	Leonard Cohen Tour	December 10–11, 2010
Jacky Cheung	The Year of Jacky Cheung World Tour	February 18–19, 2007; December 22, 2007
Jacky Cheung	1/2 Century Tour	February 6–8, 2011
Juan Gabriel	Live in Concert	September 15, 2008
Janet Jackson	Number Ones: Up Close and Personal	April 22–24, 2011; November 26, 2011
Ricky Martin	Música + Alma + Sexo World Tour	April 30, 2011
Kylie Minogue	Aphrodite: Les Folies Tour	May 22, 2011
Sting	Back to Bass Tour	November 25, 2011
Wakin Chau		January 28–29, 2012
Il Divo	Il Divo & Orchestra in Concert	July 13–14, 2012
Aretha Franklin		July 15, 2012
Tony Bennett		September 1, 2012
Sandy Lam		February 16–17, 2013
Enrique Iglesias	Sex and Love Tour	September 13–14, 2015; September 16–17, 2016
Emmanuel & Mijares	Two’r Amigos 2	September 15, 2016
The Who	The Who Hits 50!	May 29, 2016
Steely Dan	The Dan Who Knew Too Much	June 19, 2016
Jennifer Lopez		December 31, 2014
J. Cole	What Dreams May Come Tour	October 25, 2013
Siavash Ghomayshi, Michael & Aref	Christmas in Vegas	December 25, 2015
Mark Knopfler	An Evening with Mark Knopfler and His Band	September 16, 2015
Dariush		December 25, 2014
Show Lo	'Dance Soul Return' World Live Tour	November 29, 2014
Hall & Oates		October 22, 2014; March 20, 22-23, 2019
Googoosh, Martik	Friendship, The world Tour	December 22, 2018
Christina Aguilera	The Liberation Tour	October 27, 2018
Madonna	Madame X Tour	November 7, 9–10, 2019
Backstreet Boys	DNA World Tour	April 8, 9, 15–16, 2022
Creed		December 30–31, 2024
Jennifer Lopez		December 30, 2025–March 28, 2026

== Accolades ==
- Billboard Backstage Pass Awards: "Top Small Venue" (2004)
- Billboard: "Venue of the Decade" (for venues 5,000 and under) (2009)
- Billboard Touring Awards: "Top Small Venue" (2005–2007; 2009–2010)
- Las Vegas Review-Journal: "Best of Las Vegas" (2010)
- Pollstar Concert Industry Awards: 100 Top Selling Theater Venues (2006)
