= Le Rêve (show) =

Las Vegas stage production

- Company: Dragone
- Genre: Aquatic theatre
- Show type: Resident show
- Date of premiere: May 6, 2005
- Final show: March 10, 2020

Creative team
- Artistic Director: Brian Burke
- Production designer: Michel Crête
- Costume designer: Suzy Benzinger
- Composer: Benoît Jutras
- Theatre designer: Claude Santerre
- Underwater designer: Jacky Beffroi
- Assistant director: Dirk Decloedt
- Lighting designer: Jules Fisher; Peggy Eisenhauer
- Sound designer: Peter Hylenski
- Associate artistic director: Jean Pochoy
- Clown conceptor: John Gilkey
- Choreographers: Giuliano Paparinin; Marguerite Derricks
- Aerial conceptor: Didier Antoine
- Aquatic choreographer: Dacha Nedorezova
- Makeup designer: Adolfo Barreto Rivera

Le Rêve ("The Dream") was a stage production in residence at the Wynn Las Vegas casino resort. It was the only Las Vegas show set in an aquatic theater-in-the-round stage (>1 million US gallon (water capacity). The show featured diving and feats of strength with special effects, including fire effects. No seat is more than 40 feet (12 m) from the stage. The production was originally created by Franco Dragone but has been substantially revised over time. The show featured more than 90 performers and 250 cast and crew members.

Each member of the cast must become SCUBA-certified before performing in the theater. In January 2018, Le Rêve completed a two-year reimagination of the production. The show now features all-new costumes designed by Suzy Benzinger, choreography by Marguerite Derricks, music by Benoit Jutras and lighting design by Jules Fisher and Peggy Eisenhauer. In April 2019, the show was voted “Best Production Show” by the Southern Nevada Hotel Concierge Association for the ninth consecutive year.

== Show ==
While the show is continually revised over time, the central theme includes a female lead who see-saws back and forth between her dueling desires for love and passion, mind or body, as she finds herself attracted to two men. Put into a dream world to help her decide between the two suitors, she embarks on a mystical journey. The show concludes with what the production calls "a graceful and inspirational scene."

The show includes dancing, swimming, gymnastics, diving and stunt performances, aerial performance and trained dove flights. During the production run, two of the athletes playing romantic leads fell in love themselves. Olympic athletes and notable gymnasts have joined the cast over the years.

== History ==
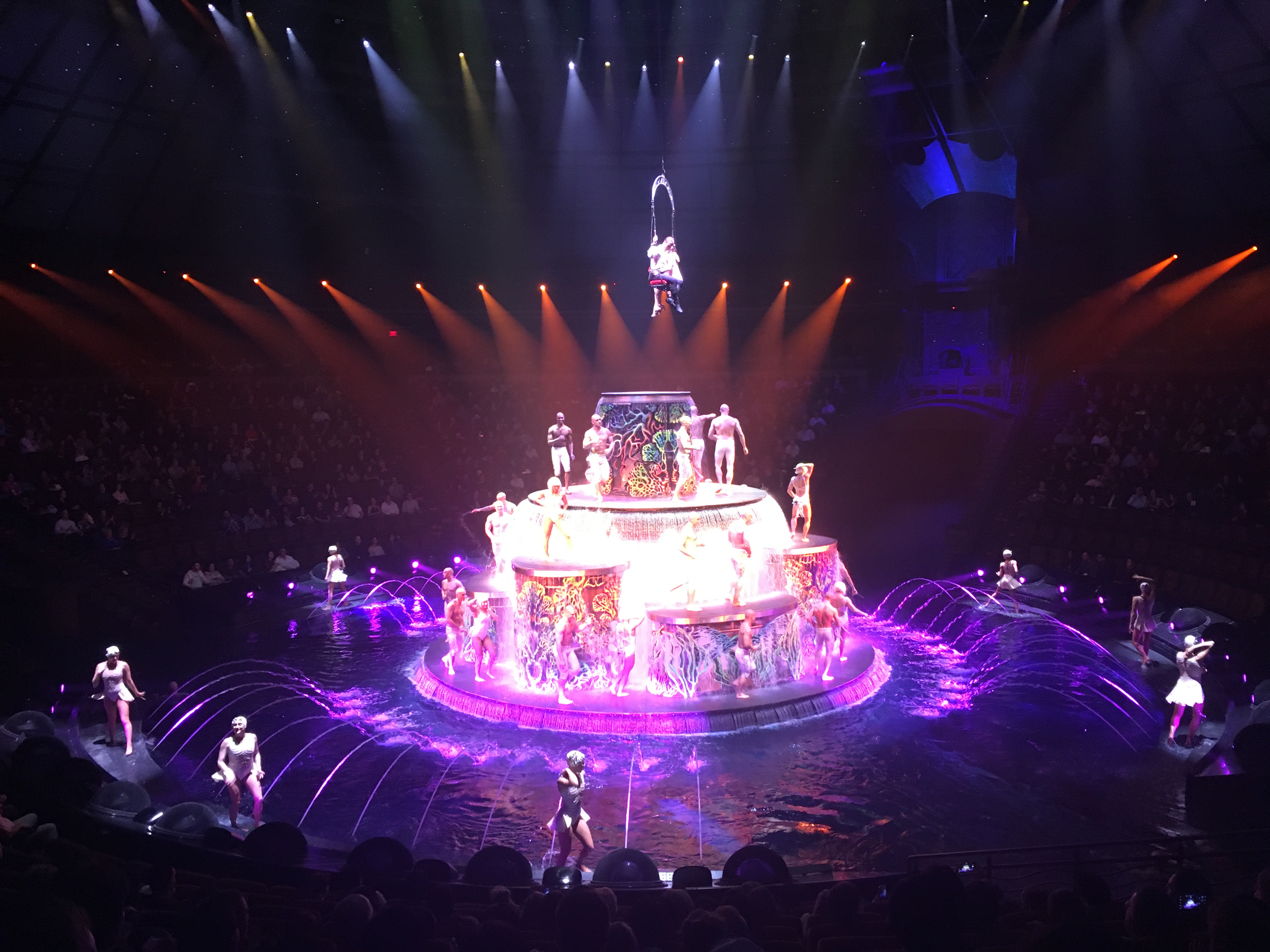
A scene from a 2018 performance of the show.

The show had its world premiere on May 6, 2005.

All rights to the show are owned by Wynn Las Vegas, so the resort is able to adapt the show at will. Le Rêve celebrated its 3,000th performance in January 2012. The show celebrated its 12th anniversary in the summer of 2017 and has performed approximately 5,700 shows. Le Rêve celebrated its 6,000th performance in May 2018.

The House of Dancing Water, has some similarities to Le Rêve and O by Cirque du Soleil.

The cast and crew of “Le Reve,” the signature production at Wynn Las Vegas since the hotel opened in 2005, were placed on furlough May 28, 2020. The first large-scale Las Vegas production show to permanently close due to the coronavirus pandemic is one of the most acclaimed performances to ever hit the Strip. Wynn Las Vegas confirmed “Le Rêve” has shuttered for good after more than 6,000 shows over the last 15 years.

=== Honors and awards ===
Year	Award	Category	Result
2016	SNHCA Choice Awards	Best Production Show	Won
2017	SNHCA Choice Awards	Best Production Show	Won

=== Media history ===
- Six performers from Le Rêve were the models for the season finale of Face Off, aired on SyFy on March 26, 2013. They also performed an act in the make-up, complete with full immersion and dives into the water.
- Le Rêve was featured on an episode of the Fine Living series What Makes it Tick, produced by NorthSouth Productions.
- Cast members from the show performed on a results episode of NBC's summer hit America's Got Talent in 2010.
- Cast members were also featured in the music video for the single "Only the Young", by Brandon Flowers.
- 32 performers from Le Rêve staged a "surreal, elaborate montage of scenes" from the show as part of the 2010 Latin Grammys at the Mandalay Bay Events Center in Las Vegas. The event was broadcast live on Univision.
- Cast members and the show were featured on the first season, episode 7 of Somebody's Gotta Do It with Mike Rowe on CNN.
- The show is featured in the movie Paul Blart Mall Cop 2, which is set almost entirely in the Wynn casino.

== Theater and facilities ==
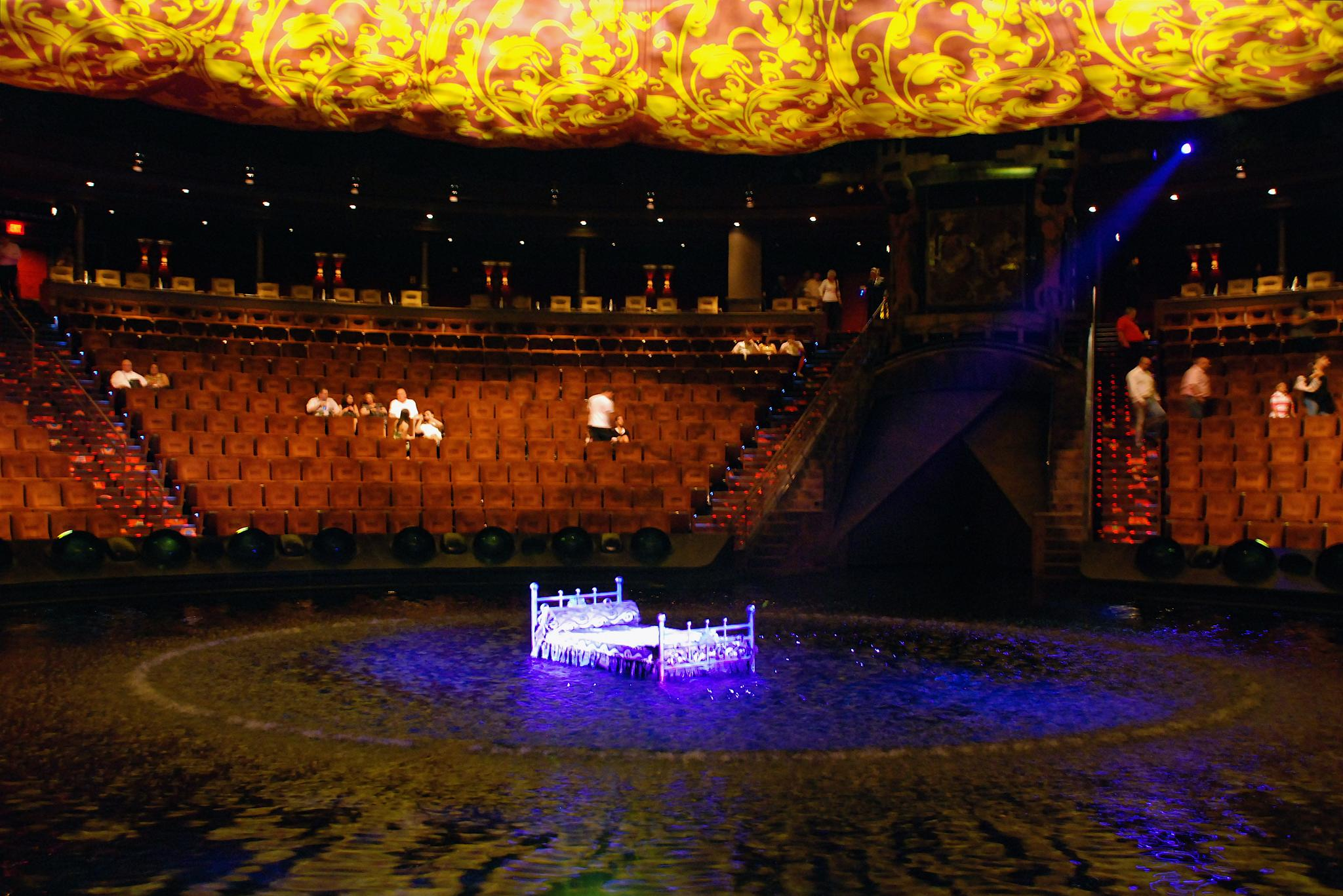
The stage for La Rêve at the Wynn Theater

The show take places in a unique aquatic theater-in-the-round. The swimming pool has a capacity of more than 1,000,000 US gallons (3,800,000 L) with its deepest point at 27 feet (8.2 m). Performers climb to heights of more than 80 feet (24 m) above the water before diving straight down. Public estimates of the cost of the theater itself were up to $75 million for the original construction, not including later renovations such as 180-speaker surround sound.

Two significant curtain effects have been used, including a 24-panel canopy that takes more than an hour to reset for the next show.

In 2008, a VIP seating area was added to the theater. In 2015, an additional 172 fountains, 120 LED lighting fixtures, and 16 fire-shooting devices were added by WET Design. Current capacity is 1,600 per show, excluding an underwater SCUBA viewing area that is occasionally available for VIP guests.
