= A New Day... =

Concert residency by Celine Dion

- Residency by Celine Dion
- Promotional poster for the residency
- Location: Paradise, Nevada
- Venue: The Colosseum at Caesars Palace
- Associated album: A New Day Has Come
- Start date: 25 March 2003
- End date: 15 December 2007
- No. of shows: 714
- Attendance: 2.82 million
- Box office: US$385.6 million ($598.73 million in 2025 dollars)

Celine Dion concert chronology
- Let's Talk About Love World Tour (1998–1999); A New Day... (2003–2007); Taking Chances World Tour (2008–2009)

A New Day... was the first concert residency by Canadian singer Celine Dion, staged at The Colosseum at Caesars Palace on the Las Vegas Strip in Paradise, Nevada. Conceived and directed by Franco Dragone, the production was developed to accompany Dion's seventh English‑language studio album, A New Day Has Come (2002). The show premiered on 25 March 2003 and concluded on 15 December 2007.

Originally contracted for a three‑year run, the residency earned Dion approximately US$100 million in base compensation, along with 50 percent of the profits. Due to strong demand and sustained commercial success, the engagement was extended for two additional years. A New Day... ultimately became the highest‑grossing concert residency in history, generating more than US$385 million ($598.73 million in 2025 dollars) and attracting nearly three million attendees across 714 performances.

Dion returned to Las Vegas on 15 March 2011 for her second residency, Celine.

== Background and creation ==
Dion originally intended to title the show Muse, but the British rock band of the same name held the worldwide performing rights to the name. Dion offered the group $50,000 in exchange for those rights, an offer they declined. Lead singer Matt Bellamy explained that the band did not want audiences to assume they were appearing as Dion's supporting act.

Early design plans called for a large video projector to serve as the primary stage backdrop. However, lighting designer Yves Aucoin noted that dancers moving in front of the projection would cast distracting shadows. In response, René Angélil approached entertainment executive Phil Anschutz, whose AEG Live was financing the production, and secured an additional $10 million to construct what became the largest indoor LED screen in North America. Manufactured by Mitsubishi Diamond Vision, the screen was an HDTV installation with an 8 mm dot pitch, assembled from multiple LED panels to create a seamless high‑resolution display.

== Critical reception ==
Upon its debut, A New Day... received mixed reviews, with several critics noting an uneven balance between theatrical elements and traditional concert performance. Writing for TheaterMania.com, Christine Westley praised the production design but argued that Dion's presence was "inconsequential at best". She added that the show's most awkward moments occurred when the dancers exited and Dion interacted directly with the audience, creating what she described as a noticeable divide between Franco Dragone's theatrical vision and a conventional Celine Dion concert.

Phil Gallo of Variety similarly commended the visual design but criticized the selection and interpretation of several classic songs. He wrote that Dion's renditions of "At Last", "Fever", and "I've Got the World on a String" highlighted what he viewed as a lack of stylistic depth, noting that her phrasing closely mirrored earlier performers. Gallo also remarked that the arrangement of "The First Time Ever I Saw Your Face" became increasingly overwrought and questioned the decision to stage the number with Dion elevated high above the stage. He concluded that while Dion appeared confident, audience engagement on opening night was limited unless she explicitly encouraged participation.

In the documentary A New Day... The Secrets, included with Live in Las Vegas: A New Day..., Dion and Dragone discussed adjustments made throughout the show's run, such as increasing the visibility of the band and refining Dion's styling to better align with audience expectations.

As the production approached its final performances, reviews grew more positive. Mike Weatherford of the Las Vegas Review-Journal wrote that Dion had "grown into" the show and that it had evolved into a polished pop spectacle with artistic touches, rather than the more experimental concept originally presented. He noted the removal of early staging choices, the introduction of new musical segments, and a shift toward a more energetic finale. Weatherford concluded that although some of the initial ambition had been scaled back, the production continued to deliver striking visual moments.

== Accolades ==
Year	Award show	Award
2005	6th Annual Visitors' Choice Awards	Favorite Headliner in Las Vegas
2005	24th Annual Las Vegas Review-Journal Best of Las Vegas Awards	Best Headliner in Las Vegas
2006	7th Annual Visitors' Choice Awards	Favorite Headliner in Las Vegas
2006	25th Annual Las Vegas Review-Journal Best of Las Vegas Awards	Best Headliner in Las Vegas
2006	Movie Entertainment Awards	Entertainer of the Year (Entertainment Industry's Most Influential Canadian)
2007	26th Annual Las Vegas Review-Journal Best of Las Vegas Awards	Best Singer
2007	26th Annual Las Vegas Review-Journal Best of Las Vegas Awards	Best All-Around Performer
2007	26th Annual Las Vegas Review-Journal Best of Las Vegas Awards	Best Show Choreography
2007	Nevada Commission on Tourism	Entertainer of the New Millennium

== Broadcasts and recordings ==
The show's opening night was filmed and broadcast as a television special for CBS under the title Celine in Las Vegas, Opening Night Live. Hosted by Justin Timberlake, the program aired on 25 March 2003.

In November 2003, the production was recorded again for commercial release. The resulting live album, A New Day... Live in Las Vegas, was issued in June 2004 and includes 13 songs from the show. A special edition of the album also contains a bonus DVD, One Year... One Heart, narrated by comedian Wayne Brady. The documentary presents rehearsal footage, behind‑the‑scenes material, moments with Dion's family, and a look at the recording of her album One Heart. The album reached number 10 on the US Billboard 200 and was certified gold by the RIAA for shipments exceeding 500,000 copies.

The show was filmed a final time in high definition in January 2007 and released on 7 December 2007 as Live in Las Vegas: A New Day.... The two‑disc set contains the full concert along with three documentaries: Because You Loved Me (A Tribute to the Fans), A New Day: All Access, and A New Day: The Secrets. The release achieved substantial international success, topping the DVD charts in the United States, United Kingdom, France, Japan, Switzerland, the Netherlands, Belgium, Denmark, New Zealand, and Estonia, and placing within the top 10 in numerous other markets worldwide.

== Set list ==
The following set list is from the 29 March 2003 performance and does not represent all shows throughout the residency.

1. "Nature Boy"
2. "The Power of Love"
3. "It's All Coming Back to Me"
4. "Because You Loved Me"
5. "To Love You More"
6. "I'm Alive"
7. "Seduces Me"
8. "If I Could"
9. "At Last"
10. "Fever"
11. "I've Got the World on a String"
12. "A New Love" (instrumental)
13. "I Surrender"
14. "The First Time Ever I Saw Your Face"
15. "Aria di Lucia de Lammermoor" (instrumental)
16. "Ammore annascunnuto"
17. "I Wish"
18. "Love Can Move Mountains"
19. "I Drove All Night"
20. "My Heart Will Go On"
21. "What a Wonderful World"

== Shows ==
=== Legs 1–10 ===
Date	Attendance	Revenue
Leg 1
25 March 2003	—	—
26 March 2003	—	—
27 March 2003	—	—
28 March 2003	—	—
29 March 2003	—	—
2 April 2003	—	—
3 April 2003	—	—
4 April 2003	—	—
5 April 2003	—	—
6 April 2003	—	—
9 April 2003	—	—
10 April 2003	—	—
11 April 2003	—	—
12 April 2003	—	—
13 April 2003	—	—
16 April 2003	—	—
17 April 2003	—	—
18 April 2003	—	—
19 April 2003	—	—
20 April 2003	—	—
23 April 2003	—	—
24 April 2003	—	—
25 April 2003	—	—
26 April 2003	—	—
27 April 2003	—	—
28 April 2003	—	—
29 April 2003	—	—
Leg 2
14 May 2003	—	—
15 May 2003	—	—
16 May 2003	—	—
17 May 2003	—	—
18 May 2003	—	—
21 May 2003	—	—
22 May 2003	—	—
23 May 2003	—	—
24 May 2003	—	—
25 May 2003	—	—
28 May 2003	—	—
29 May 2003	—	—
30 May 2003	—	—
31 May 2003	—	—
1 June 2003	—	—
4 June 2003	—	—
5 June 2003	—	—
6 June 2003	—	—
7 June 2003	—	—
8 June 2003	—	—
11 June 2003	—	—
12 June 2003	—	—
13 June 2003	—	—
14 June 2003	—	—
15 June 2003	—	—
18 June 2003	—	—
19 June 2003	—	—
20 June 2003	—	—
21 June 2003	—	—
22 June 2003	—	—
25 June 2003	—	—
26 June 2003	—	—
27 June 2003	—	—
28 June 2003	—	—
2 July 2003	—	—
3 July 2003	—	—
4 July 2003	—	—
5 July 2003	—	—
6 July 2003	—	—
Leg 3
6 August 2003	—	—
7 August 2003	—	—
8 August 2003	—	—
9 August 2003	—	—
10 August 2003	—	—
13 August 2003	20,559 / 20,559	$2,788,263
14 August 2003	20,559 / 20,559	$2,788,263
15 August 2003	20,559 / 20,559	$2,788,263
16 August 2003	20,559 / 20,559	$2,788,263
17 August 2003	20,559 / 20,559	$2,788,263
20 August 2003	20,564 / 20,564	$2,789,769
21 August 2003	20,564 / 20,564	$2,789,769
22 August 2003	20,564 / 20,564	$2,789,769
23 August 2003	20,564 / 20,564	$2,789,769
24 August 2003	20,564 / 20,564	$2,789,769
27 August 2003	20,306 / 20,306	$2,751,709
28 August 2003	20,306 / 20,306	$2,751,709
29 August 2003	20,306 / 20,306	$2,751,709
30 August 2003	20,306 / 20,306	$2,751,709
31 August 2003	20,306 / 20,306	$2,751,709
3 September 2003	20,552 / 20,552	$2,797,916
4 September 2003	20,552 / 20,552	$2,797,916
5 September 2003	20,552 / 20,552	$2,797,916
6 September 2003	20,552 / 20,552	$2,797,916
7 September 2003	20,552 / 20,552	$2,797,916
10 September 2003	20,541 / 20,541	$2,793,702
11 September 2003	20,541 / 20,541	$2,793,702
12 September 2003	20,541 / 20,541	$2,793,702
13 September 2003	20,541 / 20,541	$2,793,702
14 September 2003	20,541 / 20,541	$2,793,702
17 September 2003	20,570 / 20,570	$2,796,690
18 September 2003	20,570 / 20,570	$2,796,690
19 September 2003	20,570 / 20,570	$2,796,690
20 September 2003	20,570 / 20,570	$2,796,690
21 September 2003	20,570 / 20,570	$2,796,690
24 September 2003	20,487 / 20,487	$2,788,549
25 September 2003	20,487 / 20,487	$2,788,549
26 September 2003	20,487 / 20,487	$2,788,549
27 September 2003	20,487 / 20,487	$2,788,549
28 September 2003	20,487 / 20,487	$2,788,549
2 October 2003	16,436 / 16,436	$2,242,614
3 October 2003	16,436 / 16,436	$2,242,614
4 October 2003	16,436 / 16,436	$2,242,614
5 October 2003	16,436 / 16,436	$2,242,614
Leg 4
22 October 2003	20,403 / 20,403	$2,768,628
23 October 2003	20,403 / 20,403	$2,768,628
24 October 2003	20,403 / 20,403	$2,768,628
25 October 2003	20,403 / 20,403	$2,768,628
26 October 2003	20,403 / 20,403	$2,768,628
29 October 2003	16,379 / 16,379	$2,217,495
30 October 2003	16,379 / 16,379	$2,217,495
31 October 2003	16,379 / 16,379	$2,217,495
1 November 2003	16,379 / 16,379	$2,217,495
2 November 2003	16,379 / 16,379	$2,217,495
5 November 2003	20,564 / 20,564	$2,790,197
6 November 2003	20,564 / 20,564	$2,790,197
7 November 2003	20,564 / 20,564	$2,790,197
8 November 2003	20,564 / 20,564	$2,790,197
9 November 2003	20,564 / 20,564	$2,790,197
12 November 2003	20,583 / 20,583	$2,790,299
13 November 2003	20,583 / 20,583	$2,790,299
14 November 2003	20,583 / 20,583	$2,790,299
15 November 2003	20,583 / 20,583	$2,790,299
16 November 2003	20,583 / 20,583	$2,790,299
19 November 2003	20,519 / 20,519	$2,794,303
20 November 2003	20,519 / 20,519	$2,794,303
21 November 2003	20,519 / 20,519	$2,794,303
22 November 2003	20,519 / 20,519	$2,794,303
23 November 2003	20,519 / 20,519	$2,794,303
26 November 2003	20,564 / 20,564	$2,789,271
27 November 2003	20,564 / 20,564	$2,789,271
28 November 2003	20,564 / 20,564	$2,789,271
29 November 2003	20,564 / 20,564	$2,789,271
30 November 2003	20,564 / 20,564	$2,789,271
10 December 2003	19,928 / 19,928	$2,757,746
11 December 2003	19,928 / 19,928	$2,757,746
12 December 2003	19,928 / 19,928	$2,757,746
13 December 2003	19,928 / 19,928	$2,757,746
14 December 2003	19,928 / 19,928	$2,757,746
Leg 5
30 December 2003	20,579 / 20,579	$2,835,743
31 December 2003	20,579 / 20,579	$2,835,743
1 January 2004	20,579 / 20,579	$2,835,743
2 January 2004	20,579 / 20,579	$2,835,743
3 January 2004	20,579 / 20,579	$2,835,743
7 January 2004	18,520 / 18,520	$2,591,199
8 January 2004	18,520 / 18,520	$2,591,199
9 January 2004	18,520 / 18,520	$2,591,199
10 January 2004	18,520 / 18,520	$2,591,199
11 January 2004	18,520 / 18,520	$2,591,199
14 January 2004	19,829 / 19,829	$2,745,795
15 January 2004	19,829 / 19,829	$2,745,795
16 January 2004	19,829 / 19,829	$2,745,795
17 January 2004	19,829 / 19,829	$2,745,795
18 January 2004	19,829 / 19,829	$2,745,795
21 January 2004	20,444 / 20,444	$2,824,797
22 January 2004	20,444 / 20,444	$2,824,797
23 January 2004	20,444 / 20,444	$2,824,797
24 January 2004	20,444 / 20,444	$2,824,797
25 January 2004	20,444 / 20,444	$2,824,797
28 January 2004	7,988 / 7,988	$1,098,000
29 January 2004	7,988 / 7,988	$1,098,000
6 February 2004	12,344 / 12,344	$1,703,724
7 February 2004	12,344 / 12,344	$1,703,724
8 February 2004	12,344 / 12,344	$1,703,724
Leg 6
3 March 2004	20,546 / 20,546	$2,837,325
4 March 2004	20,546 / 20,546	$2,837,325
5 March 2004	20,546 / 20,546	$2,837,325
6 March 2004	20,546 / 20,546	$2,837,325
7 March 2004	20,546 / 20,546	$2,837,325
10 March 2004	20,518 / 20,518	$2,842,461
11 March 2004	20,518 / 20,518	$2,842,461
12 March 2004	20,518 / 20,518	$2,842,461
13 March 2004	20,518 / 20,518	$2,842,461
14 March 2004	20,518 / 20,518	$2,842,461
17 March 2004	20,459 / 20,459	$2,817,354
18 March 2004	20,459 / 20,459	$2,817,354
19 March 2004	20,459 / 20,459	$2,817,354
20 March 2004	20,459 / 20,459	$2,817,354
21 March 2004	20,459 / 20,459	$2,817,354
Leg 7
14 April 2004	20,556 / 20,556	$2,836,146
15 April 2004	20,556 / 20,556	$2,836,146
16 April 2004	20,556 / 20,556	$2,836,146
17 April 2004	20,556 / 20,556	$2,836,146
18 April 2004	20,556 / 20,556	$2,836,146
21 April 2004	20,532 / 20,532	$2,832,118
22 April 2004	20,532 / 20,532	$2,832,118
23 April 2004	20,532 / 20,532	$2,832,118
24 April 2004	20,532 / 20,532	$2,832,118
25 April 2004	20,532 / 20,532	$2,832,118
28 April 2004	20,451 / 20,451	$2,811,213
29 April 2004	20,451 / 20,451	$2,811,213
30 April 2004	20,451 / 20,451	$2,811,213
1 May 2004	20,451 / 20,451	$2,811,213
2 May 2004	20,451 / 20,451	$2,811,213
5 May 2004	19,474 / 19,474	$2,662,550
6 May 2004	19,474 / 19,474	$2,662,550
7 May 2004	19,474 / 19,474	$2,662,550
8 May 2004	19,474 / 19,474	$2,662,550
9 May 2004	19,474 / 19,474	$2,662,550
26 May 2004	19,151 / 19,151	$2,617,132
27 May 2004	19,151 / 19,151	$2,617,132
28 May 2004	19,151 / 19,151	$2,617,132
29 May 2004	19,151 / 19,151	$2,617,132
30 May 2004	19,151 / 19,151	$2,617,132
Leg 8
16 June 2004	20,151 / 20,151	$2,750,465
17 June 2004	20,151 / 20,151	$2,750,465
18 June 2004	20,151 / 20,151	$2,750,465
19 June 2004	20,151 / 20,151	$2,750,465
20 June 2004	20,151 / 20,151	$2,750,465
23 June 2004	19,629 / 19,629	$2,653,447
24 June 2004	19,629 / 19,629	$2,653,447
25 June 2004	19,629 / 19,629	$2,653,447
26 June 2004	19,629 / 19,629	$2,653,447
27 June 2004	19,629 / 19,629	$2,653,447
30 June 2004	19,358 / 20,500	$2,578,615
1 July 2004	19,358 / 20,500	$2,578,615
2 July 2004	19,358 / 20,500	$2,578,615
3 July 2004	19,358 / 20,500	$2,578,615
4 July 2004	19,358 / 20,500	$2,578,615
7 July 2004	16,439 / 17,656	$2,189,180
8 July 2004	16,439 / 17,656	$2,189,180
9 July 2004	16,439 / 17,656	$2,189,180
10 July 2004	16,439 / 17,656	$2,189,180
11 July 2004	16,439 / 17,656	$2,189,180
14 July 2004	19,465 / 19,490	$2,603,548
15 July 2004	19,465 / 19,490	$2,603,548
16 July 2004	19,465 / 19,490	$2,603,548
17 July 2004	19,465 / 19,490	$2,603,548
18 July 2004	19,465 / 19,490	$2,603,548
Leg 9
25 August 2004	18,142 / 19,692	$2,444,384
26 August 2004	18,142 / 19,692	$2,444,384
27 August 2004	18,142 / 19,692	$2,444,384
28 August 2004	18,142 / 19,692	$2,444,384
29 August 2004	18,142 / 19,692	$2,444,384
1 September 2004	15,039 / 17,345	$2,038,719
2 September 2004	15,039 / 17,345	$2,038,719
3 September 2004	15,039 / 17,345	$2,038,719
4 September 2004	15,039 / 17,345	$2,038,719
5 September 2004	15,039 / 17,345	$2,038,719
8 September 2004	17,633 / 18,338	$2,357,056
9 September 2004	17,633 / 18,338	$2,357,056
10 September 2004	17,633 / 18,338	$2,357,056
11 September 2004	17,633 / 18,338	$2,357,056
12 September 2004	17,633 / 18,338	$2,357,056
23 September 2004	15,900 / 16,231	$2,165,933
24 September 2004	15,900 / 16,231	$2,165,933
25 September 2004	15,900 / 16,231	$2,165,933
26 September 2004	15,900 / 16,231	$2,165,933
29 September 2004	19,911 / 19,911	$2,707,556
30 September 2004	19,911 / 19,911	$2,707,556
1 October 2004	19,911 / 19,911	$2,707,556
2 October 2004	19,911 / 19,911	$2,707,556
3 October 2004	19,911 / 19,911	$2,707,556
6 October 2004	20,450 / 20,450	$2,820,699
7 October 2004	20,450 / 20,450	$2,820,699
8 October 2004	20,450 / 20,450	$2,820,699
9 October 2004	20,450 / 20,450	$2,820,699
10 October 2004	20,450 / 20,450	$2,820,699
Leg 10
3 November 2004	19,624 / 19,624	$2,670,980
4 November 2004	19,624 / 19,624	$2,670,980
5 November 2004	19,624 / 19,624	$2,670,980
6 November 2004	19,624 / 19,624	$2,670,980
7 November 2004	19,624 / 19,624	$2,670,980
10 November 2004	20,231 / 20,231	$2,746,076
11 November 2004	20,231 / 20,231	$2,746,076
12 November 2004	20,231 / 20,231	$2,746,076
13 November 2004	20,231 / 20,231	$2,746,076
14 November 2004	20,231 / 20,231	$2,746,076
24 November 2004	18,714 / 20,168	$2,486,192
25 November 2004	18,714 / 20,168	$2,486,192
26 November 2004	18,714 / 20,168	$2,486,192
27 November 2004	18,714 / 20,168	$2,486,192
28 November 2004	18,714 / 20,168	$2,486,192
1 December 2004	15,947 / 19,614	$2,155,285
2 December 2004	15,947 / 19,614	$2,155,285
3 December 2004	15,947 / 19,614	$2,155,285
4 December 2004	15,947 / 19,614	$2,155,285
5 December 2004	15,947 / 19,614	$2,155,285
8 December 2004	15,100 / 18,420	$2,034,309
9 December 2004	15,100 / 18,420	$2,034,309
10 December 2004	15,100 / 18,420	$2,034,309
11 December 2004	15,100 / 18,420	$2,034,309
12 December 2004	15,100 / 18,420	$2,034,309

=== Legs 11–20 ===
Date	Attendance	Revenue
Leg 11
28 December 2004	20,532 / 20,532	$2,831,105
29 December 2004	20,532 / 20,532	$2,831,105
30 December 2004	20,532 / 20,532	$2,831,105
31 December 2004	20,532 / 20,532	$2,831,105
1 January 2005	20,532 / 20,532	$2,831,105
6 January 2005	12,955 / 15,204	$1,822,693
7 January 2005	12,955 / 15,204	$1,822,693
8 January 2005	12,955 / 15,204	$1,822,693
9 January 2005	12,955 / 15,204	$1,822,693
12 January 2005	18,703 / 19,837	$2,523,843
13 January 2005	18,703 / 19,837	$2,523,843
14 January 2005	18,703 / 19,837	$2,523,843
15 January 2005	18,703 / 19,837	$2,523,843
16 January 2005	18,703 / 19,837	$2,523,843
20 January 2005	15,138 / 16,436	$2,037,815
21 January 2005	15,138 / 16,436	$2,037,815
22 January 2005	15,138 / 16,436	$2,037,815
23 January 2005	15,138 / 16,436	$2,037,815
26 January 2005	19,065 / 20,740	$2,590,080
27 January 2005	19,065 / 20,740	$2,590,080
28 January 2005	19,065 / 20,740	$2,590,080
29 January 2005	19,065 / 20,740	$2,590,080
30 January 2005	19,065 / 20,740	$2,590,080
3 February 2005	15,454 / 16,592	$2,094,436
4 February 2005	15,454 / 16,592	$2,094,436
5 February 2005	15,454 / 16,592	$2,094,436
6 February 2005	15,454 / 16,592	$2,094,436
Leg 12
3 March 2005	16,367 / 16,367	$2,246,511
4 March 2005	16,367 / 16,367	$2,246,511
5 March 2005	16,367 / 16,367	$2,246,511
6 March 2005	16,367 / 16,367	$2,246,511
9 March 2005	19,215 / 19,215	$2,645,147
10 March 2005	19,215 / 19,215	$2,645,147
11 March 2005	19,215 / 19,215	$2,645,147
12 March 2005	19,215 / 19,215	$2,645,147
13 March 2005	19,215 / 19,215	$2,645,147
16 March 2005	19,851 / 19,851	$2,745,778
17 March 2005	19,851 / 19,851	$2,745,778
18 March 2005	19,851 / 19,851	$2,745,778
19 March 2005	19,851 / 19,851	$2,745,778
20 March 2005	19,851 / 19,851	$2,745,778
23 March 2005	20,491 / 20,491	$2,827,489
24 March 2005	20,491 / 20,491	$2,827,489
25 March 2005	20,491 / 20,491	$2,827,489
26 March 2005	20,491 / 20,491	$2,827,489
27 March 2005	20,491 / 20,491	$2,827,489
Leg 13
15 April 2005	12,191 / 12,191	$1,679,252
16 April 2005	12,191 / 12,191	$1,679,252
17 April 2005	12,191 / 12,191	$1,679,252
20 April 2005	19,688 / 19,688	$2,698,333
21 April 2005	19,688 / 19,688	$2,698,333
22 April 2005	19,688 / 19,688	$2,698,333
23 April 2005	19,688 / 19,688	$2,698,333
24 April 2005	19,688 / 19,688	$2,698,333
28 April 2005	16,339 / 16,339	$2,208,206
29 April 2005	16,339 / 16,339	$2,208,206
30 April 2005	16,339 / 16,339	$2,208,206
1 May 2005	16,339 / 16,339	$2,208,206
4 May 2005	19,777 / 19,777	$2,716,392
5 May 2005	19,777 / 19,777	$2,716,392
6 May 2005	19,777 / 19,777	$2,716,392
7 May 2005	19,777 / 19,777	$2,716,392
8 May 2005	19,777 / 19,777	$2,716,392
Leg 14
18 May 2005	20,381 / 20,381	$2,801,332
19 May 2005	20,381 / 20,381	$2,801,332
20 May 2005	20,381 / 20,381	$2,801,332
21 May 2005	20,381 / 20,381	$2,801,332
22 May 2005	20,381 / 20,381	$2,801,332
26 May 2005	16,096 / 16,096	$2,190,018
27 May 2005	16,096 / 16,096	$2,190,018
28 May 2005	16,096 / 16,096	$2,190,018
29 May 2005	16,096 / 16,096	$2,190,018
1 June 2005	18,445 / 19,422	$2,528,743
2 June 2005	18,445 / 19,422	$2,528,743
3 June 2005	18,445 / 19,422	$2,528,743
4 June 2005	18,445 / 19,422	$2,528,743
5 June 2005	18,445 / 19,422	$2,528,743
Leg 15
15 June 2005	18,832 / 20,692	$2,542,461
16 June 2005	18,832 / 20,692	$2,542,461
17 June 2005	18,832 / 20,692	$2,542,461
18 June 2005	18,832 / 20,692	$2,542,461
19 June 2005	18,832 / 20,692	$2,542,461
22 June 2005	18,312 / 19,828	$2,474,845
23 June 2005	18,312 / 19,828	$2,474,845
24 June 2005	18,312 / 19,828	$2,474,845
25 June 2005	18,312 / 19,828	$2,474,845
26 June 2005	18,312 / 19,828	$2,474,845
30 June 2005	14,956 / 15,640	$2,017,322
1 July 2005	14,956 / 15,640	$2,017,322
2 July 2005	14,956 / 15,640	$2,017,322
3 July 2005	14,956 / 15,640	$2,017,322
6 July 2005	17,156 / 18,929	$2,285,145
7 July 2005	17,156 / 18,929	$2,285,145
8 July 2005	17,156 / 18,929	$2,285,145
9 July 2005	17,156 / 18,929	$2,285,145
10 July 2005	17,156 / 18,929	$2,285,145
14 July 2005	15,470 / 15,825	$2,071,341
15 July 2005	15,470 / 15,825	$2,071,341
16 July 2005	15,470 / 15,825	$2,071,341
17 July 2005	15,470 / 15,825	$2,071,341
20 July 2005	20,156 / 20,479	$2,710,412
21 July 2005	20,156 / 20,479	$2,710,412
22 July 2005	20,156 / 20,479	$2,710,412
23 July 2005	20,156 / 20,479	$2,710,412
24 July 2005	20,156 / 20,479	$2,710,412
Leg 16
24 August 2005	18,846 / 20,334	$2,523,781
25 August 2005	18,846 / 20,334	$2,523,781
26 August 2005	18,846 / 20,334	$2,523,781
27 August 2005	18,846 / 20,334	$2,523,781
28 August 2005	18,846 / 20,334	$2,523,781
1 September 2005	14,488 / 16,592	$1,961,143
2 September 2005	14,488 / 16,592	$1,961,143
3 September 2005	14,488 / 16,592	$1,961,143
4 September 2005	14,488 / 16,592	$1,961,143
7 September 2005	17,692 / 20,678	$2,366,862
8 September 2005	17,692 / 20,678	$2,366,862
9 September 2005	17,692 / 20,678	$2,366,862
10 September 2005	17,692 / 20,678	$2,366,862
11 September 2005	17,692 / 20,678	$2,366,862
16 September 2005	12,279 / 12,279	$1,679,847
17 September 2005	12,279 / 12,279	$1,679,847
18 September 2005	12,279 / 12,279	$1,679,847
21 September 2005	19,569 / 20,599	$2,631,211
22 September 2005	19,569 / 20,599	$2,631,211
23 September 2005	19,569 / 20,599	$2,631,211
24 September 2005	19,569 / 20,599	$2,631,211
25 September 2005	19,569 / 20,599	$2,631,211
28 September 2005	19,939 / 20,200	$2,690,500
29 September 2005	19,939 / 20,200	$2,690,500
30 September 2005	19,939 / 20,200	$2,690,500
1 October 2005	19,939 / 20,200	$2,690,500
2 October 2005	19,939 / 20,200	$2,690,500
Leg 17
26 October 2005	19,366 / 20,182	$2,649,396
27 October 2005	19,366 / 20,182	$2,649,396
28 October 2005	19,366 / 20,182	$2,649,396
29 October 2005	19,366 / 20,182	$2,649,396
30 October 2005	19,366 / 20,182	$2,649,396
2 November 2005	19,184 / 20,740	$2,624,766
3 November 2005	19,184 / 20,740	$2,624,766
4 November 2005	19,184 / 20,740	$2,624,766
5 November 2005	19,184 / 20,740	$2,624,766
6 November 2005	19,184 / 20,740	$2,624,766
9 November 2005	20,353 / 20,353	$2,791,907
10 November 2005	20,353 / 20,353	$2,791,907
11 November 2005	20,353 / 20,353	$2,791,907
12 November 2005	20,353 / 20,353	$2,791,907
13 November 2005	20,353 / 20,353	$2,791,907
Leg 18
23 November 2005	19,791 / 20,492	$2,673,651
24 November 2005	19,791 / 20,492	$2,673,651
25 November 2005	19,791 / 20,492	$2,673,651
26 November 2005	19,791 / 20,492	$2,673,651
27 November 2005	19,791 / 20,492	$2,673,651
30 November 2005	15,271 / 16,438	$2,049,691
1 December 2005	15,271 / 16,438	$2,049,691
2 December 2005	15,271 / 16,438	$2,049,691
3 December 2005	15,271 / 16,438	$2,049,691
4 December 2005	15,271 / 16,438	$2,049,691
Leg 19
28 December 2005	20,520 / 20,520	$2,826,144
29 December 2005	20,520 / 20,520	$2,826,144
30 December 2005	20,520 / 20,520	$2,826,144
31 December 2005	20,520 / 20,520	$2,826,144
1 January 2006	20,520 / 20,520	$2,826,144
5 January 2006	15,509 / 16,592	$2,194,085
6 January 2006	15,509 / 16,592	$2,194,085
7 January 2006	15,509 / 16,592	$2,194,085
8 January 2006	15,509 / 16,592	$2,194,085
11 January 2006	19,027 / 20,740	$1,996,584
12 January 2006	19,027 / 20,740	$1,996,584
13 January 2006	19,027 / 20,740	$1,996,584
14 January 2006	19,027 / 20,740	$1,996,584
15 January 2006	19,027 / 20,740	$1,996,584
19 January 2006	15,115 / 16,592	$2,036,653
20 January 2006	15,115 / 16,592	$2,036,653
21 January 2006	15,115 / 16,592	$2,036,653
22 January 2006	15,115 / 16,592	$2,036,653
25 January 2006	19,774 / 20,740	$2,685,555
26 January 2006	19,774 / 20,740	$2,685,555
27 January 2006	19,774 / 20,740	$2,685,555
28 January 2006	19,774 / 20,740	$2,685,555
29 January 2006	19,774 / 20,740	$2,685,555
Leg 20
23 February 2006	16,329 / 16,329	$2,247,948
24 February 2006	16,329 / 16,329	$2,247,948
25 February 2006	16,329 / 16,329	$2,247,948
26 February 2006	16,329 / 16,329	$2,247,948
1 March 2006	18,736 / 20,740	$2,551,751
2 March 2006	18,736 / 20,740	$2,551,751
3 March 2006	18,736 / 20,740	$2,551,751
4 March 2006	18,736 / 20,740	$2,551,751
5 March 2006	18,736 / 20,740	$2,551,751
8 March 2006	18,723 / 20,740	$2,573,899
9 March 2006	18,723 / 20,740	$2,573,899
10 March 2006	18,723 / 20,740	$2,573,899
11 March 2006	18,723 / 20,740	$2,573,899
12 March 2006	18,723 / 20,740	$2,573,899
16 March 2006	15,138 / 16,592	$2,084,267
17 March 2006	15,138 / 16,592	$2,084,267
18 March 2006	15,138 / 16,592	$2,084,267
19 March 2006	15,138 / 16,592	$2,084,267
22 March 2006	19,812 / 20,740	$2,713,642
23 March 2006	19,812 / 20,740	$2,713,642
24 March 2006	19,812 / 20,740	$2,713,642
25 March 2006	19,812 / 20,740	$2,713,642
26 March 2006	19,812 / 20,740	$2,713,642

=== Legs 21–28 ===
Date	Attendance	Revenue
Leg 21
12 April 2006	12,279 / 12,279	$1,685,279
13 April 2006	12,279 / 12,279	$1,685,279
14 April 2006	12,279 / 12,279	$1,685,279
20 April 2006	—N/a	—N/a
21 April 2006	—N/a	—N/a
22 April 2006	—N/a	—N/a
23 April 2006	—N/a	—N/a
26 April 2006	18,830 / 20,740	$2,574,296
27 April 2006	18,830 / 20,740	$2,574,296
28 April 2006	18,830 / 20,740	$2,574,296
29 April 2006	18,830 / 20,740	$2,574,296
30 April 2006	18,830 / 20,740	$2,574,296
3 May 2006	19,281 / 20,740	$2,915,056
4 May 2006	19,281 / 20,740	$2,915,056
5 May 2006	19,281 / 20,740	$2,915,056
6 May 2006	19,281 / 20,740	$2,915,056
7 May 2006	19,281 / 20,740	$2,915,056
17 May 2006	19,760 / 20,580	$2,701,584
18 May 2006	19,760 / 20,580	$2,701,584
19 May 2006	19,760 / 20,580	$2,701,584
20 May 2006	19,760 / 20,580	$2,701,584
21 May 2006	19,760 / 20,580	$2,701,584
25 May 2006	15,559 / 16,592	$2,100,954
26 May 2006	15,559 / 16,592	$2,100,954
27 May 2006	15,559 / 16,592	$2,100,954
28 May 2006	15,559 / 16,592	$2,100,954
31 May 2006	18,803 / 20,740	$2,588,717
1 June 2006	18,803 / 20,740	$2,588,717
2 June 2006	18,803 / 20,740	$2,588,717
3 June 2006	18,803 / 20,740	$2,588,717
4 June 2006	18,803 / 20,740	$2,588,717
7 June 2006	18,573 / 20,740	$2,520,208
8 June 2006	18,573 / 20,740	$2,520,208
9 June 2006	18,573 / 20,740	$2,520,208
10 June 2006	18,573 / 20,740	$2,520,208
11 June 2006	18,573 / 20,740	$2,520,208
22 June 2006	15,846 / 16,592	$2,144,766
23 June 2006	15,846 / 16,592	$2,144,766
24 June 2006	15,846 / 16,592	$2,144,766
25 June 2006	15,846 / 16,592	$2,144,766
28 June 2006	18,737 / 20,740	$2,540,328
29 June 2006	18,737 / 20,740	$2,540,328
30 June 2006	18,737 / 20,740	$2,540,328
1 July 2006	18,737 / 20,740	$2,540,328
2 July 2006	18,737 / 20,740	$2,540,328
5 July 2006	19,011 / 20,740	$2,563,488
6 July 2006	19,011 / 20,740	$2,563,488
7 July 2006	19,011 / 20,740	$2,563,488
8 July 2006	19,011 / 20,740	$2,563,488
9 July 2006	19,011 / 20,740	$2,563,488
Leg 22
10 August 2006	16,202 / 16,592	$2,153,029
11 August 2006	16,202 / 16,592	$2,153,029
12 August 2006	16,202 / 16,592	$2,153,029
13 August 2006	16,202 / 16,592	$2,153,029
16 August 2006	19,001 / 20,740	$2,542,741
17 August 2006	19,001 / 20,740	$2,542,741
18 August 2006	19,001 / 20,740	$2,542,741
19 August 2006	19,001 / 20,740	$2,542,741
20 August 2006	19,001 / 20,740	$2,542,741
23 August 2006	18,865 / 20,740	$2,532,336
24 August 2006	18,865 / 20,740	$2,532,336
25 August 2006	18,865 / 20,740	$2,532,336
26 August 2006	18,865 / 20,740	$2,532,336
27 August 2006	18,865 / 20,740	$2,532,336
31 August 2006	15,152 / 16,592	$2,000,533
1 September 2006	15,152 / 16,592	$2,000,533
2 September 2006	15,152 / 16,592	$2,000,533
3 September 2006	15,152 / 16,592	$2,000,533
6 September 2006	19,016 / 20,740	$2,541,386
7 September 2006	19,016 / 20,740	$2,541,386
8 September 2006	19,016 / 20,740	$2,541,386
9 September 2006	19,016 / 20,740	$2,541,386
10 September 2006	19,016 / 20,740	$2,541,386
20 September 2006	20,156 / 20,740	$2,706,550
21 September 2006	20,156 / 20,740	$2,706,550
22 September 2006	20,156 / 20,740	$2,706,550
23 September 2006	20,156 / 20,740	$2,706,550
24 September 2006	20,156 / 20,740	$2,706,550
28 September 2006	16,339 / 16,532	$2,208,297
29 September 2006	16,339 / 16,532	$2,208,297
30 September 2006	16,339 / 16,532	$2,208,297
1 October 2006	16,339 / 16,532	$2,208,297
4 October 2006	20,499 / 20,740	$2,810,242
5 October 2006	20,499 / 20,740	$2,810,242
6 October 2006	20,499 / 20,740	$2,810,242
7 October 2006	20,499 / 20,740	$2,810,242
8 October 2006	20,499 / 20,740	$2,810,242
Leg 23
26 October 2006	16,320 / 16,320	$2,221,851
27 October 2006	16,320 / 16,320	$2,221,851
28 October 2006	16,320 / 16,320	$2,221,851
29 October 2006	16,320 / 16,320	$2,221,851
1 November 2006	19,264 / 20,740	$2,696,628
2 November 2006	19,264 / 20,740	$2,696,628
3 November 2006	19,264 / 20,740	$2,696,628
4 November 2006	19,264 / 20,740	$2,696,628
5 November 2006	19,264 / 20,740	$2,696,628
8 November 2006	20,409 / 20,740	$2,797,451
9 November 2006	20,409 / 20,740	$2,797,451
10 November 2006	20,409 / 20,740	$2,797,451
11 November 2006	20,409 / 20,740	$2,797,451
12 November 2006	20,409 / 20,740	$2,797,451
22 November 2006	20,234 / 20,740	$2,758,242
23 November 2006	20,234 / 20,740	$2,758,242
24 November 2006	20,234 / 20,740	$2,758,242
25 November 2006	20,234 / 20,740	$2,758,242
26 November 2006	20,234 / 20,740	$2,758,242
Leg 24
28 December 2006	16,404 / 16,592	$2,261,870
29 December 2006	16,404 / 16,592	$2,261,870
30 December 2006	16,404 / 16,592	$2,261,870
31 December 2006	16,404 / 16,592	$2,261,870
3 January 2007	19,596 / 20,740	$2,744,598
4 January 2007	19,596 / 20,740	$2,744,598
5 January 2007	19,596 / 20,740	$2,744,598
6 January 2007	19,596 / 20,740	$2,744,598
7 January 2007	19,596 / 20,740	$2,744,598
11 January 2007	16,151 / 16,592	$2,265,230
12 January 2007	16,151 / 16,592	$2,265,230
13 January 2007	16,151 / 16,592	$2,265,230
14 January 2007	16,151 / 16,592	$2,265,230
17 January 2007	19,543 / 20,740	$2,629,046
18 January 2007	19,543 / 20,740	$2,629,046
19 January 2007	19,543 / 20,740	$2,629,046
20 January 2007	19,543 / 20,740	$2,629,046
21 January 2007	19,543 / 20,740	$2,629,046
24 January 2007	18,721 / 20,740	$2,547,908
25 January 2007	18,721 / 20,740	$2,547,908
26 January 2007	18,721 / 20,740	$2,547,908
27 January 2007	18,721 / 20,740	$2,547,908
28 January 2007	18,721 / 20,740	$2,547,908
Leg 25
28 February 2007	20,733 / 20,733	$2,844,928
1 March 2007	20,733 / 20,733	$2,844,928
2 March 2007	20,733 / 20,733	$2,844,928
3 March 2007	20,733 / 20,733	$2,844,928
4 March 2007	20,733 / 20,733	$2,844,928
8 March 2007	16,273 / 16,592	$2,217,115
9 March 2007	16,273 / 16,592	$2,217,115
10 March 2007	16,273 / 16,592	$2,217,115
11 March 2007	16,273 / 16,592	$2,217,115
17 March 2007	8,296 / 8,296	$1,146,537
18 March 2007	8,296 / 8,296	$1,146,537
Leg 26
12 April 2007	16,359 / 16,359	$2,251,246
13 April 2007	16,359 / 16,359	$2,251,246
14 April 2007	16,359 / 16,359	$2,251,246
15 April 2007	16,359 / 16,359	$2,251,246
18 April 2007	20,690 / 20,690	$2,856,473
19 April 2007	20,690 / 20,690	$2,856,473
20 April 2007	20,690 / 20,690	$2,856,473
21 April 2007	20,690 / 20,690	$2,856,473
22 April 2007	20,690 / 20,690	$2,856,473
26 April 2007	16,592 / 16,592	$2,293,960
27 April 2007	16,592 / 16,592	$2,293,960
28 April 2007	16,592 / 16,592	$2,293,960
29 April 2007	16,592 / 16,592	$2,293,960
2 May 2007	20,631 / 20,631	$2,850,497
3 May 2007	20,631 / 20,631	$2,850,497
4 May 2007	20,631 / 20,631	$2,850,497
5 May 2007	20,631 / 20,631	$2,850,497
6 May 2007	20,631 / 20,631	$2,850,497
16 May 2007	20,713 / 20,713	$2,861,782
17 May 2007	20,713 / 20,713	$2,861,782
18 May 2007	20,713 / 20,713	$2,861,782
19 May 2007	20,713 / 20,713	$2,861,782
20 May 2007	20,713 / 20,713	$2,861,782
24 May 2007	16,592 / 16,592	$2,293,021
25 May 2007	16,592 / 16,592	$2,293,021
26 May 2007	16,592 / 16,592	$2,293,021
27 May 2007	16,592 / 16,592	$2,293,021
30 May 2007	20,330 / 20,740	$2,787,637
31 May 2007	20,330 / 20,740	$2,787,637
1 June 2007	20,330 / 20,740	$2,787,637
2 June 2007	20,330 / 20,740	$2,787,637
3 June 2007	20,330 / 20,740	$2,787,637
13 June 2007	20,647 / 20,740	$2,852,913
14 June 2007	20,647 / 20,740	$2,852,913
15 June 2007	20,647 / 20,740	$2,852,913
16 June 2007	20,647 / 20,740	$2,852,913
17 June 2007	20,647 / 20,740	$2,852,913
21 June 2007	16,592 / 16,592	$2,294,297
22 June 2007	16,592 / 16,592	$2,294,297
23 June 2007	16,592 / 16,592	$2,294,297
24 June 2007	16,592 / 16,592	$2,294,297
27 June 2007	20,740 / 20,740	$2,866,956
28 June 2007	20,740 / 20,740	$2,866,956
29 June 2007	20,740 / 20,740	$2,866,956
30 June 2007	20,740 / 20,740	$2,866,956
1 July 2007	20,740 / 20,740	$2,866,956
Leg 27
16 August 2007	16,592 / 16,592	$2,294,524
17 August 2007	16,592 / 16,592	$2,294,524
18 August 2007	16,592 / 16,592	$2,294,524
19 August 2007	16,592 / 16,592	$2,294,524
22 August 2007	20,711 / 20,711	$2,863,760
23 August 2007	20,711 / 20,711	$2,863,760
24 August 2007	20,711 / 20,711	$2,863,760
25 August 2007	20,711 / 20,711	$2,863,760
26 August 2007	20,711 / 20,711	$2,863,760
29 August 2007	—N/a	—N/a
30 August 2007	—N/a	—N/a
31 August 2007	—N/a	—N/a
1 September 2007	—N/a	—N/a
2 September 2007	—N/a	—N/a
5 September 2007	20,740 / 20,740	$2,867,617
6 September 2007	20,740 / 20,740	$2,867,617
7 September 2007	20,740 / 20,740	$2,867,617
8 September 2007	20,740 / 20,740	$2,867,617
9 September 2007	20,740 / 20,740	$2,867,617
20 September 2007	—N/a	—N/a
21 September 2007	—N/a	—N/a
22 September 2007	—N/a	—N/a
23 September 2007	—N/a	—N/a
26 September 2007	20,740 / 20,740	$2,867,979
27 September 2007	20,740 / 20,740	$2,867,979
28 September 2007	20,740 / 20,740	$2,867,979
29 September 2007	20,740 / 20,740	$2,867,979
30 September 2007	20,740 / 20,740	$2,867,979
4 October 2007	—N/a	—N/a
5 October 2007	—N/a	—N/a
6 October 2007	—N/a	—N/a
7 October 2007	—N/a	—N/a
10 October 2007	20,740 / 20,740	$2,876,278
11 October 2007	20,740 / 20,740	$2,876,278
12 October 2007	20,740 / 20,740	$2,876,278
13 October 2007	20,740 / 20,740	$2,876,278
14 October 2007	20,740 / 20,740	$2,876,278
Leg 28
29 November 2007	16,592 / 16,592	$2,760,848
30 November 2007	16,592 / 16,592	$2,760,848
1 December 2007	16,592 / 16,592	$2,760,848
2 December 2007	16,592 / 16,592	$2,760,848
5 December 2007	20,740 / 20,740	$3,457,546
6 December 2007	20,740 / 20,740	$3,457,546
7 December 2007	20,740 / 20,740	$3,457,546
8 December 2007	20,740 / 20,740	$3,457,546
9 December 2007	20,740 / 20,740	$3,457,546
12 December 2007	16,564 / 16,564	$2,755,100
13 December 2007	16,564 / 16,564	$2,755,100
14 December 2007	16,564 / 16,564	$2,755,100
15 December 2007	16,564 / 16,564	$2,755,100

== Annual boxscore ==
Year	Pollstar ranking	Total gross	Total attendance	Shows	Source
2003	#2	US$80.5 million	593,120	145	
2004	#2	US$80.4 million	589,494	154	
2005	#3	US$81.3 million	597,632	155	
2006	#6	US$78.1 million	577,095	147	
2007	#4	US$65.3 million	462,616	113	
Total	—	US$385.6 million	2,819,957	714	

== Personnel ==
Sources:

- Celine Dion – lead vocals

=== Band ===
- Claude "Mego" Lemay – conductor, piano
- Jean-Sébastien Carré – violin
- André Coutu – guitar
- Paul Picard – percussion (until 2006)
- Nannette Fortier – percussion (from 2007)
- Yves Frulla – keyboards
- Marc Langis – bass guitar
- Dominique Messier – drums
- Julie McInnes – cello
- Élise Duguay – backing vocals, cello, tin whistle
- Mary-Lou Gauthier – backing vocals
- Barnev Valsaint – backing vocals

=== Production ===
- Franco Dragone – director
- Pavel Brun – associate director
- Claude "Mego" Lemay – musical director
- Brian Burke – artistic director
- Michel Crête – set and image design
- Yves "Lapin" Aucoin – lighting design
- Denis Savage – sound design
- Dirk Decloedt – projection content design
- Annie Horth – costume design
- Dominique Lemieux – costume design
- Seble Maaza – costume design
- Richard Ruiz – costume design
- Mia Michaels – choreography
- Elijah Brown – white character
- Deon Ridley – dance captain
- Tina Cannon – dance captain
- Lavert Benefield – dance captain
- Andrea Ziegler – dance captain

== See also ==
- List of highest-grossing concert series at a single venue
- List of most-attended concert series at a single venue
