= Glossary of juggling =

Cascade: alternating inside tosses, siteswap 3

Reverse cascade: alternating outside tosses, siteswap 3

Burke's Barrage, siteswap: 423; the 4 is a tossed directly up, the 2 is a carry, and the 4 ball should be claw caught

Juggling terminology, juggling (especially toss juggling) terms:

Alternating/Asynchronous
tosses or catches, where one hand makes a toss, then the second hand makes a toss, as opposed to synchronous.
Asymmetrical
juggling patterns whose length is an even number (and thus repeats on the same hand), as opposed to symmetrical. For example, the shower pattern.
Balance
resting a prop on one's body or an object for a beat or more
Beat
the duration between consecutive tosses, tosses and catches, or catches. Beats are counted by siteswap.
Bounce
allowing an object to bounce off a hard surface, typically the floor, before being caught.
Bounce juggling
juggling including or consisting of bounces and catches.
Carry
to move, or "carry", a ball with the first hand to the location it would have been caught at by the second hand instead of throwing it towards that spot, and to then throw it from that location using the first hand.
Catch
when a ball lands on one's hand or is grabbed out of the air.
Claw/Snatch/Overhand
where the hand throwing or catching a ball is turned upside down so that the palm of the hand faces the ground.
Contact juggling
a form of object manipulation that focuses on the movement of objects such as balls in contact with the body (rolls or rolling).
Cross
where one hand is passed over or under the other arm before throwing or catching.
Feed
to pass a prop directly from one hand to the other. Siteswap: 1.
Flash
to throw and catch each object, as many as possible, only once. A form of numbers juggling. May also refer to patterns such as 55500 which allow a "flashy" move such as a clap or pirouette.
Half
a variation of a pattern which may be more simple, sometimes may be used as preparation for, and generally resembles a truncated version of its namesake. For example the shower and the half-shower have siteswaps 51 and 3).
Hold time
also "dwell time", the time, relative to the siteswap beats, which is a prop is held. Ladder diagrams often show no dwell time, with the prop landing at the same moment as its toss.
Inside
to throw a prop in one hand under the prop just thrown or to be thrown. See: outside and reverse.
Multiplex
a toss of more than one object at a time. Also refers to patterns containing multiplexes. The reverse is a squeeze catch.
Notation
the written depiction of concepts and practices in juggling, such as siteswap and ladders.
Numbers juggling
juggling with as many objects as possible. See: flash and qualify.
Orbit
a carry where the held ball is moved around another ball in a circle, as if orbiting. "Orbit" is also used in a technical sense to refer to, "the cycle of throws which a ball follows." For example, the cascade (3) has one orbit while tennis (3) has two.
Outside
to throw a prop in one hand over the prop just thrown or to be thrown. See: inside and reverse.
Overhead
"Juggling with your arms up in the air above your head & looking up from underneath the pattern," such as the overhead cascade
Parity
whether a pattern may be done only with an even or odd number of props or may be done either way. For example, the cascade may be done with any odd number of props greater than or equal to 3.
Pass
to throw an object to another juggler.
Pattern
a specific manipulation of props during the practice of juggling.
Period
the length of a pattern before it repeats. The cascade (3) has a period of 1 and the half-box (441) has a period of 3.
Prop
an object used to juggle. If not a ball, such as a bean bag, objects used include juggling clubs, juggling rings, cigar boxes, knives, and torches.
Qualify or qualifying
numbers juggling where every prop must be thrown and caught at least twice, in contrast to a flash.
Reverse
tossing to the inside instead of the outside, or the outside instead of the inside. For example, the cascade and the reverse cascade.
Shape distortion
a variation of a pattern with the same siteswap but a different shape, such as the half-shower and the Statue of Liberty (both siteswap: 3, the latter uses overhead juggling).
Squeeze or squeeze catch
the reverse of a multiplex, where more than one ball is caught in the same hand simultaneously on the same beat.
Sticks/batons
Wooden rods or doweling, predates modern clubs.
Symmetrical
juggling patterns with patterns whose length is an odd number (and thus repeats on the other hand), as opposed to asymmetrical.
Synchronous
tosses or catches made by each hand at the same time, as opposed to alternating.
Toss
a throw up into the air.
Toss juggling
juggling consisting of tosses and catches ( in distinction to non-tossing forms of juggling, like e.g. swinging clubs or poi, twirling a bâton, or contact juggling where the prop rolls along bodyparts ).
Two-in-One
columns, using one hand and two balls, "where the balls travel vertically in their own separate paths."
