= List of siteswaps =

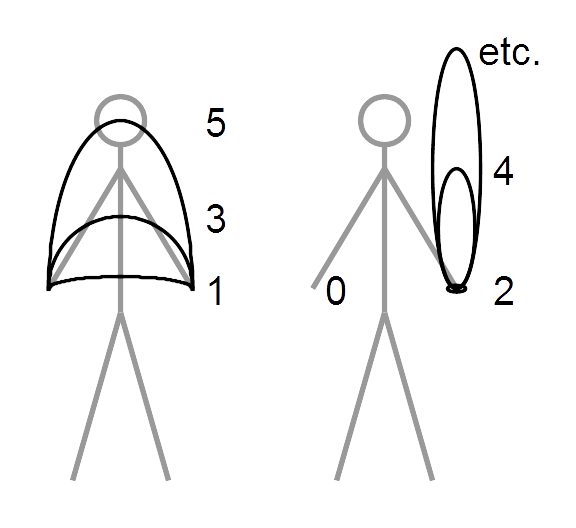
Siteswap beats shown as relative height

<3p3|3p4|3p5|3p1|3p2><3|3|3|3|3><3|3|3|3|3><3|3|3|3|3>

Below is a list of siteswaps or juggling patterns by siteswap.

Toss juggling requires more balls than hands. Thus tricks such as the one ball cascade toss back and forth, 300, for example, may not be considered valid patterns. Throws back and forth shower style, odd numbers, are the most common one prop practice. Invalid or practice patterns and tricks are marked with an X.

The numbers are as follows:

- 0 = "missing"/rest [empty hand]
- 1 = pass [between hands]
- 2 = hold [one hand/no toss]
- 3 = (3-ball) cascade toss [between hands]
- 4 = (4-ball) fountain or columns toss [up and into same hand]
- 5 = high toss [between hands]
- ...
- a = 10 = high columns/fountain toss
- ...

Symbols:

- Number: Relative height of a toss. 1, 2, 3...
- Brackets []: Multiplex. [333]33.
- Chevrons and vertical bar <|>: Simultaneous and passing patterns.
  - P: Pass. <333P|333P>
  - Fraction: Pass 1/y beats later. <4.5 3 3 | 3 4 3.5>
- Parentheses (): Synchronous pattern.
  - *: Synchronous pattern that switches sides. (4,2x)(2x,4) = (4,2x)*
  - x: Toss to the other hand during a synchronous pattern.

== Asynchronous ==
Animations

531

Cascade: 5

Cascade: 7

A pattern is symmetrical (S) if both hands play the same role and asymmetrical (A) if not. All asynchronous patterns whose periods are odd are symmetrical, and all asynchronous patterns whose periods are even are asymmetrical.

Juggling patterns by siteswap
Siteswap	Name	Props	Period	Symmetry (S/A)
0 X	Empty hand	0	1	S
1 X	Direct toss to other hand	1	1	S
2 X	Holding a prop in each hand	2	1	S
3	Cascade, reverse cascade, etc.	3	1	S
4	Fountain, etc.	4	1	S
5	Cascade, reverse cascade, etc.	5	1	S
6	Fountain	6	1	S
7	Cascade	7	1	S
8	Fountain	8	1	S
9	Cascade	9	1	S
20 X	Hold a prop in 1 hand, 0 in the other	1	1	A
31 X	Two prop shower	2	2	A
40	2 in 1 (single handed column/fountain)	2	2	A
42	2 in 1, hold 1 in the other	3	2	A
51	Shower	3	2	A
53	Half shower	4	2	A
60	Three in one	3	2	A
62	3 in 1, hold in the other	4	2	A
64	3 in 1, 2 in the other	5	2	A
71	Shower	4	2	A
73	Half shower (see synchronous)	5	2	A
75	Half-shower	6	2	A
80	Four in one	4	2	A
82	Four in one, hold in the other	5	2	A
84	Four in one, two in the other	6	2	A
86	Four in one, three in the other	7	2	A
91	Shower	5	2	A
93	Half-shower	6	2	A
95	Half-shower	7	2	A
97	Half-shower	8	2	A
312 X	Shower alternating direction	2	3	S
330 X	Cascade with a "hole"	2	3	S
423	Burke's barrage, etc.	3	3	S
441	Half box and reverse, 441 Mills Mess	3	3	S
453	453	4	3	
501	Snowball	2	3	S
504	504, 450	3	3	S
522	522	3	3	S
531	531 and 531 Mills Mess	3	3	S
534	534	4	3	S
552	4 out of 5	4	3	S
561	561	4	3	S
612	See-saw	3	3	S
615	615 61616,	4	3	S
633	633	4	3	S
642	642	4	3	S
645	645	5	3	S
663	663	5	3	S
714	714	4	3	S
723	723	4	3	S
726	726	5	3	S
741	741	4	3	S
744	744	5	3	S
756	756	6	3	S
771	771	5	3	S
753	753	5	3	S
801	801	3	3	S
831	831	4	3	S
867	867	7	3	S
915	915	5	3	S
945	459	6	3	S
978	978	8	3	S
4413	4413	3	4	A
4440	Gap/3 out of 4 (fountain)	3	4	A
5223	Slow half-shower	3	4	A
5241	5241	3	4	A
5313	Asymmetric version of 531)	3	4	A
5524	5524	4	4	A
5551	5551	4	4	A
6312	6312	3	4	A
6424	6424	4	4	A
7131	High-Low Shower	3	4	A
7333	7333	4	4	A
7531	7531	4	4	A
7562	7562	5	4	A
7571	7571	5	4	A
8040	High-low three in one	3	4	A
9955	9559	7	4	A
40141 X	40141	2	5	S
42333	Marden's Marvel and Relf's Factory	3	5	S
42423	Orinoco Flow (423 with an extra 4)	3	5	S
44133	Frostbite and Mills Mess Shower	3	5	S
45141	45141	3	5	S
50505	Chase, snake, etc.	3	5	S
51234	12345	3	5	S
51414	51414	3	5	S
52233	Rubenstein's Revenge and Romeo's Revenge	3	5	S
52512	Boston shuffle, "baby", etc.	3	5	S
52512*	Burke's Slam, (5251221525)	3	5	S
53133	Shuffler's mess	3	5	S
53444	Tennis	4	5	S
55014	55014	3	5	S
55244	55244	4	5	S
55500	"Flash" (3 out of 5)	3	5	S
55514	55514	4	5	S
55550	Gap/four out of five	4	5	S
56414	56414	4	5	S
66161	66161	4	5	S
66661	66661	5	5	S
67561	67561	5	5	S
68141	68141	4	5	S
75751	75751	5	5	S
77731	77731	5	5	S
81411	Super box	3	5	S
88333	88333	5	5	S
94444	94444	5	5	S
95353	95353	5	5	S
97333	97333	5	5	S
97441	97441	5	5	S
97522	97522	5	5	S
517131	One up one down	3	6	A
615150	Shower with a "leak"	3	6	A
661515	661515	4	6	A
719151	One high one low	4	6	A
777171	777171	5	6	A
5224233	Relf's Rubensteins	3	7	S
7161616	7161616	4	7	S
7272712	7272712	4	7	S
33333342	Icelandic Shuffle	3	8	A
123456789	123456789	5	9	S
8483848034	8483848034	5	10	A
53145305520	53145305520	3	11	S

== Synchronous ==
(6x,4)(4,2x)(4,6x)(2x,4)

A pattern is symmetric if all throws made by the right hand are made by the left hand in the same order. It follows that a synchronous pattern is symmetric if the sequence of throws made by one hand in the siteswap notation is a rotation of the other.

Juggling patterns by siteswap
Siteswap	Name	Props	Period	Symmetry (S/A)
(2x,4x)	Half-shower	3	1	A
(4,2)	Fake Columns, yo-yo etc. (identical to 42)	3	1	A
(4,2x)(2x,4)	Box	3	2	S
(4,4)	Columns, etc.	4	1	S
(4,4)(4,0)	Columns/One Up Two Up	3	2	A
(4,4)(4x,0)*	Alternating columns	3	4	S
(4,6x)(2x,4)	(4,6x)(2x,4)	4	2	A
(4x,2x)	Shower	3	1	A
(4x,2x)(4,2x)(2x,4x)(2x,4)	Double box	3	4	S
(4x,4x)	Crossing columns	4	1	S
(4x,6)(6,4x)	Box	5	2	S
(6,2x)(6,2x)*	Box	4	4	S
(6,2x)(6,2x)(2x,6)(2x,6)	(6,2x)(6,2x)(2x,6)(2x,6)	4	4	S
(6,4)	3 in 1, 2 in the other	5	1	A
(6,4x)(4x,2)	(6,4x)(4x,2)	4	2	A
(6,6)(6,2)	3 in 1, 2 in the other	5	2	A
(6,6)(6,6)(6,0)	3 in 1, 2 in the other	5	3	A
(6x,2)(6,2x)(2,6x)(2x,6)	(6x,2)(6,2x)(2,6x)(2x,6)	4	4	S
(6x,2x)	Shower	4	1	A
(6x,2x)(2x,6x)	Box shower/shower box	4	2	S
(6x,4)(4,2x)(4,4)(4,6x)(2x,4)(4,4)	Tennis	4	6	S
(6x,4)(4,2x)(4,6x)(2x,4)	Synchronous 534	4	4	S
(6x,4)(4,6x)	(6x,4)(4,6x)	5	2	S
(6x,4x)	Half shower	5	1	A
(6x,6x)(2x,2x)	(6x,6x)(2x,2x)	4	2	S
(8,2x)(4,2x)(2x,8)(2x,4)	Dan Bennett's box	4	4	S

== Passing ==
Animations

<3p2|3p1|3><3|3|3><3p3|3|3p1><3|3|3>

<3|3p3|3p2|3><3|3|3|3><3p2|3p1|3p4|3p3><3|3|3|3>

Four-count

Juggling patterns by siteswap
Siteswap	Name	Props	Period	Symmetry (S/A)	Timing (S/A)
<3p|3p>	One-count	6	1	S	A
<3p3|3p3> or <33p|33p>	Two-count	6	2	A	A
<3p33|3p33>	Three-count	6	3	S	A
<3p333|3p333>	Four-count	6	4	A	A
<3p33333|3p33333>	Six-count	6	6	A	A
<5p333><335p3>	Simplest 4 count 7 prop	7	4	A	A

== Ladder diagrams ==
Half-box: 441

53145305520

Box: (4,2x)(2x,4)

Burke's barrage: 423

Cascade: 3

Columns: (4,4)(4,0)no i want 3 ball columns

Columns, alternating: (4,4)(4x,0)

Rubenstein's revenge: 52233

Shower (asynchronous): 51

Shower (synchronous): (4x,2x)

Fountain (asynchronous): 4

Fountain (synchronous): (4)(4)

Four-count pass juggling: <3p333|3p333>

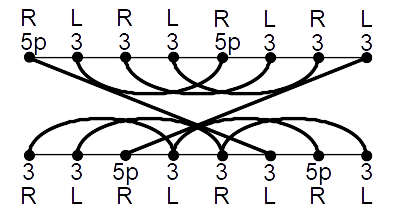
4 count 7 prop 2 juggler pattern
