= Rubenstein's Revenge =

Three-ball juggling pattern

Rubenstein's revenge
- Minimum prop #: 3
- Difficulty: 6/10 >3.5 (note: difficulty ratings are arbitrary and subject to change)
- Siteswap: 52233
- Period: 5
- Parity: odd
- Notes: symmetrical, asynchronous

Ladder diagram for Rubenstein's revenge: 52233

In toss juggling, Rubenstein's Revenge is a 3-ball juggling pattern named by George Gillson after its inventor, Rick Rubenstein. Along with Mills' Mess and Burke's Barrage, it is one of three well-known named juggling patterns that involve complex carries and crossed arm throws. Rubenstein's Revenge is usually considered the most involved and difficult of the three.

== Description ==
Rubenstein's Revenge is a shape distortion of the three-ball Siteswap 52233. A shape distortion means that the throws are done from non-standard positions, in this case, using crossed arm movements. The varying heights can be represented in Siteswap notation by the numbers 52233. In this notation, each of the numbers represents one particular throw in a sequence of five throws.

- The 5 is thrown under the arm as in a windmill or Mills Mess.
- The hand that threw the 5 will now be crossed under the other arm, which now uncrosses, which is a held 2.
- The first arm now crosses over the second arm while holding its ball, this is the second 2.
- The next toss is a 3, which is thrown under the arm by the second hand on the side opposite to where the 5 was thrown.
- The final toss is a 3, which is an uncrossing reverse cascade throw.

This is one cycle of Rubenstein's Revenge.

In addition to the varying ball heights, Rubenstein's Revenge incorporates elements of chops, claws and orbits. While the ball thrown as a 5 is in midair, the two other balls are carried in circular orbits around each other. These balls are then thrown and caught with the palm of the hand turned at an odd angle as in claws. One of these balls is caught with a downward diagonal movement as in chops.

The overall pattern results in a fluid and natural spiraling motion of the hands and balls. The trick is difficult to understand, especially from a written description.
