= Forms of juggling =

Juggling practice has developed a wide range of patterns and forms which involve different types of manipulation, different props, numbers of props, and numbers of jugglers. The forms of juggling shown here are practiced by amateur, non-performing, hobby jugglers as well as by professional jugglers. The variations of juggling shown here are extensive but not exhaustive as juggling practice develops and creates new patterns on a regular basis. Jugglers do not consciously isolate their juggling into one of the categories shown; instead most jugglers will practice two or more forms, combining the varieties of juggling practice. Some forms are commonly mixed, for example: numbers and patterns with balls; while others are rarely mixed, for example: contact numbers passing. Many Western jugglers also practice other forms of object manipulation, such as diabolo, devil sticks, cigar box manipulation, fire-spinning, contact juggling, hat manipulation, poi, staff-spinning, balancing tricks, bar flair and general circus skills.

== Solo juggling ==
=== Toss juggling ===
Toss juggling is the form of juggling which is most recognisable as 'juggling'. Objects, typically balls, clubs or rings, are repeatedly thrown and caught in a variety of different patterns and styles.

The term "toss juggling" is only used by a very small subset of jugglers to distinguish between "pure juggling" (throwing and catching juggling) and the wider range of circus skills usually associated with the term "juggling" like diabolo, devilstick, cigar boxes and more.

==== Balls ====
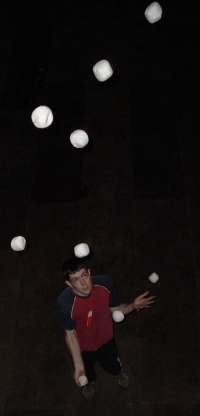
Peter Bone juggling 9 balls

For the purposes of record keeping and ease of communication, the terms balls and beanbags are generally interchangeable in the juggling world.

===== Numbers =====
Numbers juggling is the art and sport of keeping as many objects aloft as possible. 7 or more balls or rings, or 5 or more clubs is generally considered the threshold for numbers. Traditionally, the goal has been to "qualify" a number, that is, to get the pattern around twice such that each object has been thrown and caught twice. A newer generation of jugglers tends to value a "flash", which is to throw and catch each object only once. Since a flash is much less difficult than a qualifying run, there will be numbers flashed but not yet qualified. For example, the current world records are: Balls/Beanbags − 12 qualified, 14 flashed; Rings − 10 qualified, 13 flashed; and Clubs/Sticks − 8 clubs qualified, 9 sticks flashed, 9 clubs flashed.

===== Pattern =====
Jugglers who focus on juggling as many patterns as possible, many of them mathematically generated using Siteswap. Jugglers focus on aesthetic variations, and trying to juggle the longest patterns, the most complex patterns, or the patterns with the highest throws. They will also often juggle well known patterns like Mills Mess, Burke's Barrage, Rubenstein's Revenge with more than three balls.

===== Trick =====
Jugglers learn or make up as many tricks as they can and link them together in unique sequences. Usually the juggler focuses on: body throws, tricks with crossing arms, multiplexes (having more than one ball in the hand at the time of the throw), carrying balls around other balls and different styles of catching. Typically three, four or five balls are juggled. The juggler is generally stationary and only uses their hands.

===== Technical =====
Juggling is usually considered to be "technical" if the skills are of substantial difficulty. While many artistic jugglers are also technical, the term is usually used to refer to those jugglers who focus on doing harder moves, rather than making an artistic impression or performance.

===== Full body =====
The whole body can be used for controlling the objects being manipulated. These manipulations can be the forms from toss juggling such as throws and catches including catches with the head, arms, back, legs and feet and also include contact juggling moves such as head and arm rolls. A full body juggler may also use forms of body movement akin to dance altering their stance, posture and their orientation and using their body and the props in a choreographed performance.

===== Bounce =====
In bounce juggling, a form of tossing, silicone or rubber balls are allowed to bounce off a hard surface, typically the floor, before catching again. There are a few distinct tricks with bouncing balls, mixing up different rhythms, speeds and types of throws, but most popular is numbers bouncing. Bounce juggling may be "easier to accomplish than is toss juggling because the balls are grabbed at the top of their trajectories, when they are moving the slowest."

===== Football =====
Juggling footballs, basketballs, water polo balls or volleyballs. The most classic skills are spinning balls, then stacking the spinning balls, bouncing balls on the head, shoulder, feet or floor. Elements of contact juggling are often mixed in, rolling the larger balls around the body.

==== Rings ====
Rings are less popular than balls and clubs. The main reasons are:

- they can be quite painful to catch, especially for beginners, as the very thin cross-section and hard plastic can act like blades;
- they are affected by very light winds, meaning they are usually juggled inside;
- rings are best thrown and caught with the hand above the elbow, unlike balls and clubs in which throws and catches are made lower and feel more natural;
- due to their size, rings must be thrown fairly high, especially when compared to balls.

However, when jugglers are comfortable with ring juggling, they can create an effective performance. Rings are about as impressive as clubs onstage, but are easier to juggle because they do not have to be spun as precisely.

===== Numbers =====
Rings lend themselves well to numbers juggling. Because of their light weight and aerodynamic structure they can be thrown high with less exertion than would be required when juggling balls or clubs. Generally numbers juggling with rings begins at 8 or more rings. Some jugglers attempt to set world records for most rings juggled and longest runs with increased numbers of rings.

===== Tricks =====
Few people use rings to create new tricks. Usually a juggler will do tricks that they have learned with balls or clubs, but using rings instead. Even so, inventing juggling tricks unique to rings is becoming more popular.

===== Technical =====
Technical ring jugglers concentrate on five to seven rings. They focus primarily on performance tricks such as pirouettes, juggling above the head and backcrosses. They also usually master collecting all the rings over their head at the end of a performance, which is called a pulldown.

==== Clubs ====
Clubs (sometimes incorrectly called "pins" by those new to juggling) are very popular with solo jugglers. Again, only the most popular forms of club juggling are listed.

===== Numbers =====
Most jugglers consider five or six clubs as the start of numbers clubs juggling. Due to clubs being larger and heavier than balls as well as needing to be spun correctly, numbers club juggling is much harder and therefore less popular than numbers juggling with balls.

===== Tricks =====
Many tricks are unique to clubs. The size and shape opens up possibilities with balances, rolls, flourishes, swings, slapbacks, wrong end catches and more. Most tricks are done with the juggler standing still and mostly using the hands and head.

===== Technical =====
Technical club juggling focuses on three to five clubs. There are many moves to do with clubs, among them being pirouettes, juggling above the head, backcrosses, shoulder throws, and kickups. Also juggling with a balance or head bounce. Many jugglers do Siteswap, although this is less common with clubs than with balls.

==== Other objects ====
Various other objects are often used for added showmanship. Tennis rackets, throwing knives, or lit torches may be used in place of clubs. Apples or raw eggs are sometimes used in place of balls. (The performer will typically take bites of the apple in the middle of the act.) Other more extreme examples might include chainsaws, bowling balls, or other heavy or unwieldy objects. These are of course, considerably more dangerous, and usually only used by the most experienced jugglers. Some performers will mix various objects of widely differing weights, sizes, and shapes, requiring them to adjust their throwing force for each object.

=== Contact juggling ===
Instead of throwing balls, a juggler may roll them over the hands and body. Usually “crystal” balls (actually acrylic or plastic) are used. There are two distinct forms. A. Rolling one or two balls all over the hands, arms and body. B. Controlling three to eight balls, revolving them in stacks in the palms of the hands. Both forms often use the idea of "isolation". The impression is given of one ball being fixed in space and the juggler, or the other balls, moving around this stationary ball.

=== Club swinging ===
Two clubs are swung about the body in different patterns, speeds, directions, planes and phases. Sometimes the clubs are thrown but are usually held all the time. Some toss jugglers don't consider club swinging to be "real juggling" as the props are not thrown and caught enough. Club swinging is also done with heavy wooden clubs as a form of exercise or fitness training.

== Multiple person juggling ==
Instead of juggling on their own, jugglers can pass props between each other as a pair or group.

=== Passing ===
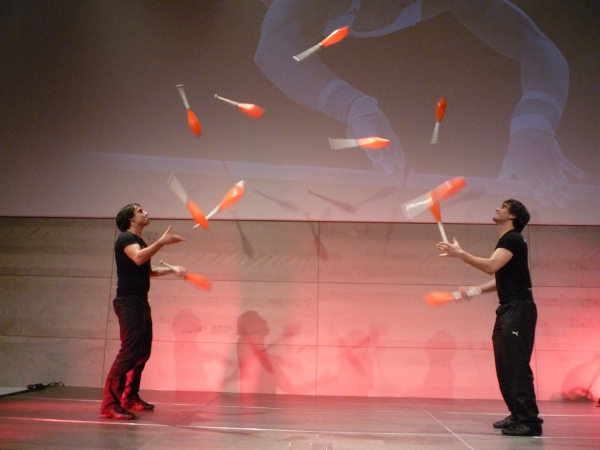
Manuel and Christoph Mitasch, world record holding club passers.

Two or more jugglers share a juggling pattern between them, usually facing each other. Passing has many forms, usually practiced with clubs.

==== Numbers ====
Popular with clubs, rings and bouncing balls, but not so much with balls. A team of two jugglers who work hard together can sometimes juggle more than twice as many clubs between them as each can juggle alone. Very few people do anything but numbers passing with rings and bouncing balls.

==== Tricks ====
Usually two jugglers concentrating on the unique trick opportunities presented while passing clubs. This is often based on a single pattern, like 6 club 2 count (throwing to someone else every two beats) or 4 count (passing every four beats), with the tricks thrown within the regular beats. The basic throws are things like tomahawks, shoulder throws, flats, early and late doubles, multiplexes, and many more. Also solo club juggling tricks can be mixed in between the passes.

==== Groups ====
For three people there is the feed. Typically there is one feeder (who passes to everyone else) and two or more feedees (who only pass to a feeder). This can be extended to include more jugglers by turning it from a V to an N, where there are two feedees, and to a W with 5. Popular formations are the triangle, the Y, the line, the square and the star. The juggling patterns are normally quite simple with complexity being added by jugglers turning or walking around within the group, changing from feedee to feeder and back again. The basic pattern for 5 or more people is the Feast, where everybody passes to everybody including themselves, turing in a clockwise direction.

==== Patterns ====
Keeping things interesting by working out ever more complex series of passes (throwing the club to someone else), selves (throwing to yourself), holds (not throwing the club at all) and zips (grabbing the club out of one hand with your other). These are set over varying number of beats and are repeated by each juggler. The most basic patterns are like pass-self-self-self. At the more complex end are patterns with four jugglers each doing something like pass-zip-self-pass-pass-self-zip-pass all out of phase with each other. Of course, with more than two jugglers involved they must also know whom they are passing to on each beat.

==== Technical ====
Based on the traditional skill set mentioned in the solo club section. Usually passing six to nine clubs either face to face or back-to-back. Technical passing is very difficult so sequences usually have to be choreographed in advance for the tricks to work, unlike regular passing tricks.

=== Other two-person forms of juggling ===
==== Sharing ====
Also called half-juggling, buddy juggling or Siamese juggling. Two jugglers stand side-by-side and juggle patterns that one person would do on their own. The patterns juggled in this way are often symmetrical but can be asymmetrical. The range of sharing patterns and tricks from side-by-side numbers passing to very complex arm weaving patterns with only three balls.

==== Stealing ====
One person juggles a regular pattern. The other person steals all of the props and keeps the pattern going without a pause. Patterns can be stolen from in front, behind, above, below or from either side. This form of juggling is most popular with clubs and balls.

==== Takeouts ====
Takeouts involve one juggler stealing a single prop form another juggler and replacing it with another prop, or the same prop a few beats later. Confusingly this form can also be called stealing.

==== Synch ====
Popularized by juggler Thomas Dietz, this form of two person juggling involves two jugglers executing tricks simultaneously. This is visually impressive and difficult to do perfectly.
