= Albert Lucas (juggler) =

American juggler (born 1960)

Albert Lucas is an American juggler born in 1960 to Albert and Yvonne Moreira. He is notable for juggling while ice skating, setting numbers juggling records, and promoting sport juggling.

== Career ==
With the encouragement of his father, Albert began juggling at age 3 and performing at age 4 in comedy clubs, small circuses and nightclubs. From age 8 to 11 he toured with Liberace and then performed in Las Vegas. From age 12 to 22, he traveled the world performing his juggling act on ice with the Ice Capades. Albert spent several years performing in the Around the World on Ice show at Busch Gardens Theme Park. Albert has performed at both the NBA Finals and the NHL Stanley Cup Final.

== Sport juggling ==
Albert co-founded the International Sport Juggling Federation in order to develop sport juggling, including joggling, with the goal of re-introducing it to the Olympics. He has joggled in 12 marathons, including a marathon with no drops in 1987, which established a Guinness world record.

== Skills ==
At the age of 10, Albert won the Numbers Competition with seven rings at the International Jugglers' Association Summer Festival in 1970. He was the U.S. Nationals Champion at the IJA Summer Festival in 1984. He is the first person to have qualified 10 objects in competition, juggling 10 rings for 20 catches at the IJA Summer Festivals in 1996 and 2002. He currently holds the world record flash 13 rings.

== Albert throws ==
Kit Summers named a juggling trick after Albert—an "albert throw"—which is a reverse club throw under the leg, made from front to back without either foot leaving the floor. This trick was performed by many earlier jugglers, originating with Morris Cronin, who specialized in club juggling during the early 1900s.

== See also ==
- List of jugglers
