= Columns (juggling) =

Juggling pattern

- Minimum prop #: 3
- Siteswap: (4,4)(4,0)
- Shannon: 4
- Period: 4
- Parity: even or odd
- Notes: asymmetrical, synchronous or asynchronous

Ladder diagrams for synchronous nonalternating and alternating columns, siteswap: (4,4)(4,0) and (4,4)(4x,0)

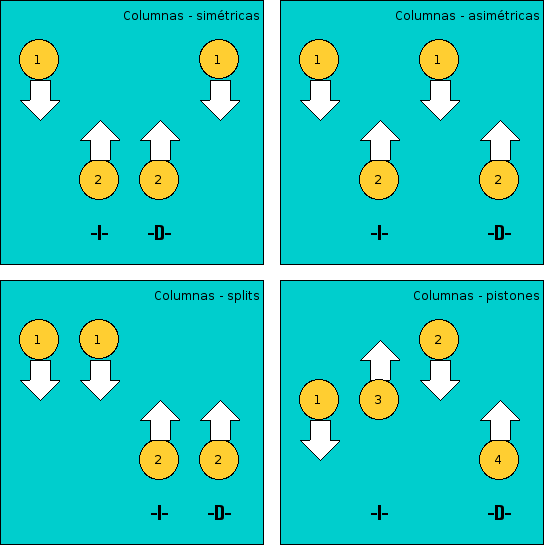
4 ball synchronous columns: "symmetrical", "asymmetrical", "splits", and asynchronous columns "pistons"

In toss juggling, columns, also known as One-up Two-up, is a juggling trick or pattern where the balls are thrown upwards without any sideways motion, distinguishing it from the fountain. The simplest version involves having three balls, with two going up simultaneously on either side, followed by one going up in the middle. One way to accomplish this is to juggle 2 balls in one hand and one ball in the other, so one hand has to move faster and further than in a regular pattern (cascade), whilst the other remains almost stationary. The hand juggling the center ball can alternate with each repeat to make the pattern symmetric.

== Variations ==
The two-in-one is a variant using two balls in one hand (the hand with the "lone" ball is unused), "where the balls travel vertically in their own separate paths...Columns is really just a Two-in-One in one hand with a third ball thrown synchronously from the other hand."

There are many variations to the simple three-ball pattern. Some involve alternating the placement of the 'lone' inside throw, while others involve the two outside throws.

The 'lone' ball may be to either side of the two balls, and can have its position in relation to them altered whilst juggling the pattern by throwing it not at a vertical angle, or moving the hand holding it when it has been caught. This ball can also be thrown quickly from one hand to the other as in a box pattern, whilst the other two balls are in midair.

The two balls being thrown and caught simultaneously may also be moved, for example crossing them over in the air, so that they do not land in the hand which threw them. The hands holding these balls may also cross or uncross at any time during the pattern.

Another common variation is to carry one of the two outside throws up and down rather than throwing it, which may be called the Dummy pattern, or "fake columns" (siteswap: (4,2)), which may be interpreted as adding a carry to the "lone" hand during the two-in-one. "Juggle two balls in one hand, but instead of throwing and catching the third ball with the other hand, you simply hold it in that hand, moving the ball up and down." The carried ball can then be moved in many different ways to complement the pattern. In a variation called Yo-yo (siteswap: (4,2)), or The String, the ball is carried up and down directly above one of the other balls to give the impression that the balls are connected by an invisible string, like a yo-yo.

The trick can be extended to any number of balls and can be varied by doing synchronous [siteswap: (4,4)(4,0)] or asynchronous throws (siteswap: 3). The props used may also be altered.

== Siteswap ==
The synchronous siteswap of the basic version of the trick is (4,4)(4,0). What the notation fails to capture is that 4s are always thrown in straight lines, which can be considered an essential property of the trick, given the name (props thrown in an oval would be a fountain pattern).
