= Flash (juggling) =

Juggling pattern

Cascade flash: 3 throws & 3 catches

Mills mess flash: 6 throws & 6 catches

In toss juggling, a flash is either a form of numbers juggling where each ball in a juggling pattern is only thrown and caught once or it is a juggling trick where every prop is simultaneously in the air and both hands are empty.

The former is considered by some not to be real juggling, however the term is used to distinguish the flash from the more continuous qualify or qualifying juggle, wherein every prop must be thrown and caught at least twice. For some tricks the number of throws and catches to complete a juggling cycle for that trick is not simply a multiple of the number of objects being juggled. For example, a three-ball cascade, one throw and catch per ball means three throws and three catches. However, for a four-ball Mills Mess, this means six throws & catches, as one round of the pattern requires six throws to complete it.

The second meaning of a 'flash' is a "flashy" move, such as a clap or a pirouette, performed by the juggler during a pattern with time when all props are in the air, such as during the 3 out of 5 juggling pattern, (siteswap: 55500). A three-ball flash is considered a good preparation for learning the five-ball cascade pattern.

World records are kept for both juggling (qualifying) and flashing (the first definition of the term) for balls and bean bags, clubs and sticks, and rings.

== See also ==
- Juggling world records
