= Mills' Mess =

Juggling pattern

Mills' mess
- Minimum prop #: 3
- Siteswap: 3
- Shannon: 12
- Period: 1
- Parity: even or odd
- Notes: symmetrical, asynchronous

In toss juggling, Mills' Mess is a popular juggling pattern, typically performed with three balls although the props used and the number of objects can be different. The pattern was invented by and named after Steve Mills. It is a well-known trick among jugglers and learning it is considered somewhat of a milestone, "a mind-boggling pattern of circling balls, crossing and uncrossing hands, and unexpected catches."

The base of this pattern is a traditional reverse cascade, (siteswap 3 in siteswap notation), with an extra "mess" added by crossing and uncrossing arms. The effect created is that the balls pursue each other from one side to the other. It is also a windmill pattern which changes direction every three throws.

== Modern origin ==
Mills Mess was invented in the early 1970s (between 1974 and 1975). Steve Mills was experimenting with many different variations that his teacher Ron Graham, Ron Lubman and a few others were doing in Central Park. Mills was inspired to do a two-handed variation of a crossing of the arm trick performed by Lubman. Mills invented the trick while attempting to transition smoothly from right-handed windmill to left-handed windmill. About the naming of the trick Mills adds: "The pattern received its name from fellow jugglers at the 1976 International Juggling Convention in Los Angeles, California. Steve Mills did not know how to "teach" this pattern and while trying different methods of teaching this pattern with many proficient jugglers, they shouted 'this is a mess.'" Mills did not know this was being called "Mills Mess" around the world for several years.

== Variants ==
Four ball Mills' Mess

Mills Mess can be combined with chops, claws, or other juggling maneuvers or flourishes to create a pattern that is moderately more difficult than the traditional three-ball cascade. Though most commonly performed with balls, bean-bags or similar objects, the pattern is adaptable to rings, clubs, torches and a variety of other juggling props. Four-, five-, and (recently) six- and seven-ball variations of these patterns have also been performed, as well as four, five and six clubs.

=== Rubenstein's Revenge ===
Rubenstein's Revenge is a heavily embellished and distorted Mills Mess. It is one of the most famous Mills Mess variations.

=== Boston Mess ===
The Boston Mess is a variant of Mills Mess in which the arms similarly cross and uncross, but the balls are thrown in columns. It is performed with three balls in a columnar cascade pattern (siteswap 3). Cherry Picking is a variant of the Boston Mess in which every catch from one hand is clawed. The Boston Mess was named that by an anonymous 20 year old juggler from Kansas City who demonstrated his trick, which he had previously called "skyscrapers," for a group of jugglers in Harvard Yard on July 5, 1988.

=== Eric's Extension ===
Eric's Extension, invented by Eric Uhrhane, is a variation on Mills Mess in which the arms cross twice on each side instead of just once. The extra throws may add to the visual appeal of the pattern. Eric's Extension requires the juggler's arms to be slender or flexible to cross two times, a requirement which makes this variation physically impossible for some. It is especially difficult with clubs.

=== Inside Out ===
When combined with chops (a chop is a downward sweep or flourish of the hand that has just caught and is holding a ball), the Mills Mess pattern is sometimes called "Inside Out"—from its appearance when performed: alternate chops alternating from inside the pattern to outside the pattern, making it seem almost as if the balls are juggling the hands. The effect is that of a juggler frantically pursuing the balls in their staccato movements. The American artist, Glenn (with no last name) aka "The Great Bongo", gave this pattern its name, and claims to have taught hundreds of jugglers "how to do it the easy way".

=== Siteswaps ===
Mills Mess is a shape distortion involving crossing and uncrossing arm movement, which is independent of the siteswap being performed. Any siteswap with any number of objects can, in theory, be done in Mills Mess. It is merely a distortion of the pattern's shape. The standard Mills Mess has the siteswap 3, but Mills Messes of 441, 531 (tower), 534 (four props) and many others have also been performed. The three ball 51 (the shower), 423, 414 (half box), 315, and 612 (see-saw), as well as the four prop 4 (columns or fountain), 534, 552, and the five prop cascade, 5, may have the Mills Mess shape distortion imposed upon them with varying degrees of difficulty.
