= Claw (juggling) =

Juggling trick

Burke's Barrage, siteswap: 423; the 4 is a tossed directly up, the 2 is a carry, and the 4 ball should be claw caught

In toss juggling, a claw (also called a snatch) is a trick where the hand throwing or catching a ball is turned upside down so that the palm of the hand faces the ground. The effect is that of the jugglers hand appearing to snatch the ball out of the air. A claw can be juggled as an isolated trick, or be incorporated into an already existing juggling pattern. For example, the Boston Mess can be juggled with each right hand throw as a claw. The resulting pattern is known as cherry picking.

Many other well known juggling patterns incorporate claw throws or catches. In most instances, both a throw and subsequent catch are performed as a claw. There are some exceptions to this rule however. For instance, in Burke's Barrage the two balls that are thrown as siteswap 4s in columns and caught with a claw, while none of the throws are clawed.
