= Box (juggling) =

Juggling pattern

- Minimum prop #: 3
- Difficulty: 6/10 (note: difficulty ratings are arbitrary and subject to change)
- Siteswap: (4,2x)(2x,4)
- Shannon: 12
- Period: 4
- Parity: odd
- Notes: asymmetrical, synchronous

Ladder diagram for box: (4,2x)(2x,4)

Shape of the balls in the half-box and box juggling patterns, 423 has a higher throw between hands

In toss juggling, the box is a juggling pattern for 3 objects, most commonly balls or bean bags. Two balls are dedicated to a specific hand with vertical throws, and the third ball is thrown horizontally between the two hands. Its siteswap is (4,2x)(2x,4).

The box pattern can be seen as a synchronous shower (a fountain), which direction is changed at every throw. The half-box is similar, but asynchronous, with siteswap 441. 441 has been described as, "the simplest non-obvious siteswap," as, "a very popular and pretty pattern," and, "a great pattern." The seesaw (siteswap: 612), is also known as the box. It resembles 441 without the two-in-one or an asynchronous (4,2x)(2x,4).

== Vamp Types ==
The horizontal, hand-crossing throw in the box is known as the "vamp". In a traditional box pattern, the vamp crosses underneath the vertical paths of the other two "side balls". However, there are several variations on this vamp's placement.

Title	Description	Demonstration
The Shuffle	In a shuffle throw, the vamp ball begins above and outside the vertical path of one of the box's "side balls" and is thrown diagonally downward, caught below the opposite "side ball". As such, it begins with the vamp ball raised in the upper corner of the pattern, and ends in a typical box position.	A shuffle throw from left to right in slow motion
The Reverse Shuffle	The reverse shuffle is a time-reversed shuffle throw. The ball begins below one of the box's airborne "side balls," as in a normal box, but is thrown diagonally upwards, and caught above the opposite "side ball". As such, it ends with the vamp ball raised in the upper corner of the pattern.	A reverse shuffle throw from right to left in slow motion
The Inverted Vamp	The inverted vamp travels above both "side balls", switching between the upper corners of the pattern. The fast movement required of the vamp ball, as well as the height limit imposed on the "side balls" to allow the vamp to travel above them, make the inverted vamp one of the most difficult vamp types.	An inverted vamp throw from left to right in slow motion

== Variations ==
Half-box: 441.

=== Inverse box ===
In the inverse box, the siteswap stays the same and two balls (4s) are still thrown in straight lines, but the ball thrown from the right hand is going up and down on the left side and vice versa. This results in rather fast hand movements, because after the right hand has thrown all up on the left side, both hands need to rush to the right so that the left hand can throw the next ball on the right side.

=== Outside box ===
Outside box is same as the original version, except that the fast horizontal (2x) ball is thrown outside the landing vertical ball and caught outside the next thrown vertical ball. For visual appeal, the 2x should thrown as vertical as possible; very easily its flight path becomes too arced and the trick loses its visual appeal.

=== Luke's shuffle ===
Luke's shuffle is a variation on the box in which the throws that are normally thrown horizontally are thrown diagonally downward. In this pattern, the siteswap stays the same, but the throw involves carrying the ball up over the rising 4 throw. The ball is then thrown from above the 4 diagonally downward to the opposite hand. The resulting downward throw is often known as a shuffle, giving the trick its name. This trick was invented by Luke Jugglestruck (Luke Gravett) in 1991 and shown to Charlie Dancey who included it in his book.
