= Shower (juggling) =

Juggling pattern

- Minimum prop #: 3
- Siteswap: 51 or (4x,2x)
- Shannon: 6
- Period: 2
- Parity: even or odd
- Notes: asymmetrical, synchronous or asynchronous

Ladder diagram for asynchronous (51) and synchronous (4x,2x) shower

In toss juggling, the shower is a juggling pattern for 3 or more objects, most commonly balls or bean bags, where objects are thrown in a circular motion. Balls are thrown high from one hand to the other while the other hand passes the ball back horizontally. "In the shower pattern, every ball is thrown in a high arc from the right hand to the left (or vice versa) and then quickly passed off with a low throw from the left to the right hand (or vice versa)." The animation depicts a 3-ball version. Siteswap notation for shower patterns is (2n-1)1, where n is the number of objects juggled. (i.e. 31 for 2 balls, 51 for 3 balls, 71 for 4 balls, etc...) The circular motion of the balls is commonly represented in cartoons as the archetypical juggling pattern, somewhat at odds with reality, where the cascade is more common. By constantly reversing the direction, the box pattern can be formed.

There are two different types of shower: synchronous shower, where both hands throw their ball at the same time and asynchronous shower. The half-shower resembles the shower, but is siteswap 3. It is, "one of the best of all the routines for strengthening and for improving all-around agility and coordination." A variant of the shower or shape distortion of the half-shower, the Statue of Liberty (siteswap: 3), involves one overhead hand.

== Difficulty ==
Paths traveled by balls in the shower and half-shower patterns

One attraction of the shower pattern is that it does not change with increasing numbers of props. "The props follow each other around in circles." The four-ball pattern is exactly the same as the three-ball pattern, except that the balls are thrown higher or faster. This is unlike a cascade pattern for odd numbers of props, which must be juggled as a fountain if another prop is added.

The easiest shower is the two-ball shower which many people often define as juggling. Asked to demonstrate juggling with two objects the average person is likely to throw one in the air, pass across the other, and catch the first in the other hand. Performed continuously, this is a two-ball shower. However this two object shower is not defined as toss juggling which is most usually defined as the manipulation of more objects than the number of hands doing the manipulation.

A three-ball shower is significantly more difficult for a beginner than a three-ball cascade, due to the height, speed, and asymmetry of the two throws. However, once mastered it is easy to perform for long periods, or to combine with other tricks. "The shower is more complicated than the cascade, but some people find that the movement comes naturally to them."
