= Multiplex (juggling) =

Juggling trick

3-ball Cascade with triplex: [333]33

Multiplexing is a juggling trick or form of toss juggling where more than one ball is in the hand at the time of the throw. The opposite, a squeeze catch, is when more than one ball is caught in the hand simultaneously on the same beat. If a multiplex throw were time-reversed, it would be a squeeze catch.

== Terminology ==
=== Number of props ===
Multiplex throws are given different names depending on the number of balls used, for example a one-ball throw (with one ball held) would be called a uniplex, a two-ball throw would be called a duplex, and a three-ball throw, a triplex. A four and a five-ball throw would be called a quadruplex and a quintuplex, respectively.

=== Throw types ===
Multiplex throws are generally grouped into different categories: Stack, Split, Cut, and Slice.

Stacked multiplex throws involve throwing both balls from one hand and catching them both in the same or other hand.

Split multiplex throws, as the name suggests, involve throwing both balls from one hand, "splitting" them in the air, and catching them in separate hands.

Cut multiplex throws involve throwing both balls to the same or other hand like a stacked multiplex but in a staggered fashion so the bottom ball of the duplex is caught, and re-thrown before the top ball is caught. These are used in the Shower Explosion family of multiplex tricks.

Sliced multiplex throws involve throwing both balls with one ball going directly to the opposite hand as a pass. This throw is usually made with the catching hand directly above the throwing hand so that when the throw is made, one ball goes straight up into the catching hand, with little to no air time, while the remaining ball is caught on a later beat.

In the case of triplexes, a split can result in one or two balls being caught in the opposite hand. An 'inside' split triplex denotes one ball being caught in the opposite hand, due to the single ball being on the inside of the triplex, and an 'outside' split triplex denotes two balls being caught in the opposite hand.

A cut and split multiplex can be combined in a triplex and this is referred to as a cut-split triplex indicating that both types of throw are involved.

=== Air position ===
Multiplex throws can be further classified depending upon the position of the balls in the air after the throw is made. In the case of duplexes, two balls side by side is a horizontal duplex, and two balls one above the other is a vertical duplex. This terminology can be applied to either the stack, split or cut duplex types of throw. So, a vertical stacked duplex refers to two balls being thrown together, one above the other in the air, and caught together in the same or other hand. A horizontal split duplex refers to two balls being thrown together, side by side in the air, and caught in separate hands. In the case of triplexes, three balls one above the other is a vertical triplex and three balls in a triangle pattern is a triangle triplex.

== Notation ==
4 ball multiplex, 3-ball-cascade, one "5" juggled with it: [53]3333

Siteswap notation is a way of writing down a key feature of juggling patterns: the order in which the balls are thrown. Multiplex throws are notated inside square brackets [ ]. For example, two balls held in the hand for a beat is notated [22] while [54] represents a split duplex where one ball is rethrown five beats later and the other ball four beats later.

When working out the average of a multiplex siteswap, to determine the number of balls in the pattern, the throws inside the brackets are added together but treated as one throw. So, [43]23 = [4+3]+2+3 = 12. 12 / 3 (throws) = a 4-ball pattern.

It is possible to combine two siteswaps to make a new trick. The three-ball siteswap '423' and the two-ball siteswap '330' combined give the five-ball siteswap [43][32]3. Since siteswaps can be rotated, 330 can also be read as '033' and '303' and thus, when combined with 423, give the five-ball siteswaps 4[32][33] and [43]2[33] respectively.

If two siteswaps of differing lengths are combined, for instance 423 and 31, the length of the new siteswap can be determined by multiplying the two lengths together. Using the aforementioned siteswaps as an example, 423 (length 3) and 31 (length 2) give the siteswap [43][21][33][41][32][31] (length 6).

== Styles ==
=== Claymotion ===
Claymotion is a style of multiplex juggling that was developed by British juggler Richard Clay in the early 1990s and was first given the name 'Claymotion' by Erica Kelch-Slesnick in 1997. Claymotion juggling is a sub-category of multiplex juggling that has a start-stop rhythm to it, not unlike cigar box juggling, so there are times when there are no balls in the air. Emphasis is placed on the graceful movements of the arms and so throws are typically low and controlled.
