= Alex Barron (juggler) =

British juggler

Alex Barron is a British juggler.

== Career ==
Barron was born in London. He started juggling in summer 2006. He has set numerous world records for juggling with more than nine balls. He became the first person to ever juggle eleven balls, and to flash 13 and 14 balls. In August 2010, aged 16, he set his first world record when he did 15 catches with 11 balls, tying with Bruce Sarafian's world record from 2001.

== Records ==
Barron holds the following world records (as of 2019):

- 12 balls: 20 catches in 2017
- 13 balls: 15 catches in 2013
- 14 balls: 14 catches in 2017

Barron received a Master of Science degree in Artificial Intelligence in 2017 from Stanford University.

== See also ==
- List of jugglers
- Juggling world records
