= Toss juggling =

Form of juggling

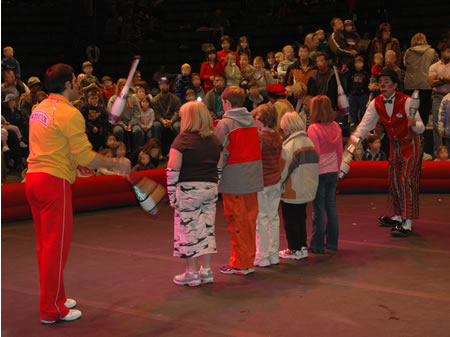
Juggling pair performing basic two-person passing with clubs

Toss juggling is the form of juggling which is most recognisable as 'juggling'. Toss juggling can be used as: a performing art, a sport, a form of exercise, as meditation, a recreational pursuit or hobby.

In toss juggling, objects—such as balls, bean bags, rings, clubs, etc.—are thrown or tossed into the air and caught. Toss juggling is a form of object manipulation.

== Juggling techniques and patterns ==
Toss juggling has a number of basic principles and patterns. Most of the more complex patterns are variations of the basic ones and all toss juggling must conform to these basic principles.

=== Basic principles ===
Toss juggling is, according to most sources, the throwing and catching of objects, where there are more objects than there are hands (or sometimes other parts of the body) doing the throwing and catching. Three balls thrown and caught between two hands is toss juggling, as there are more balls than hands. Two balls between two hands would not be considered toss juggling, as the number of balls and hands is equal.

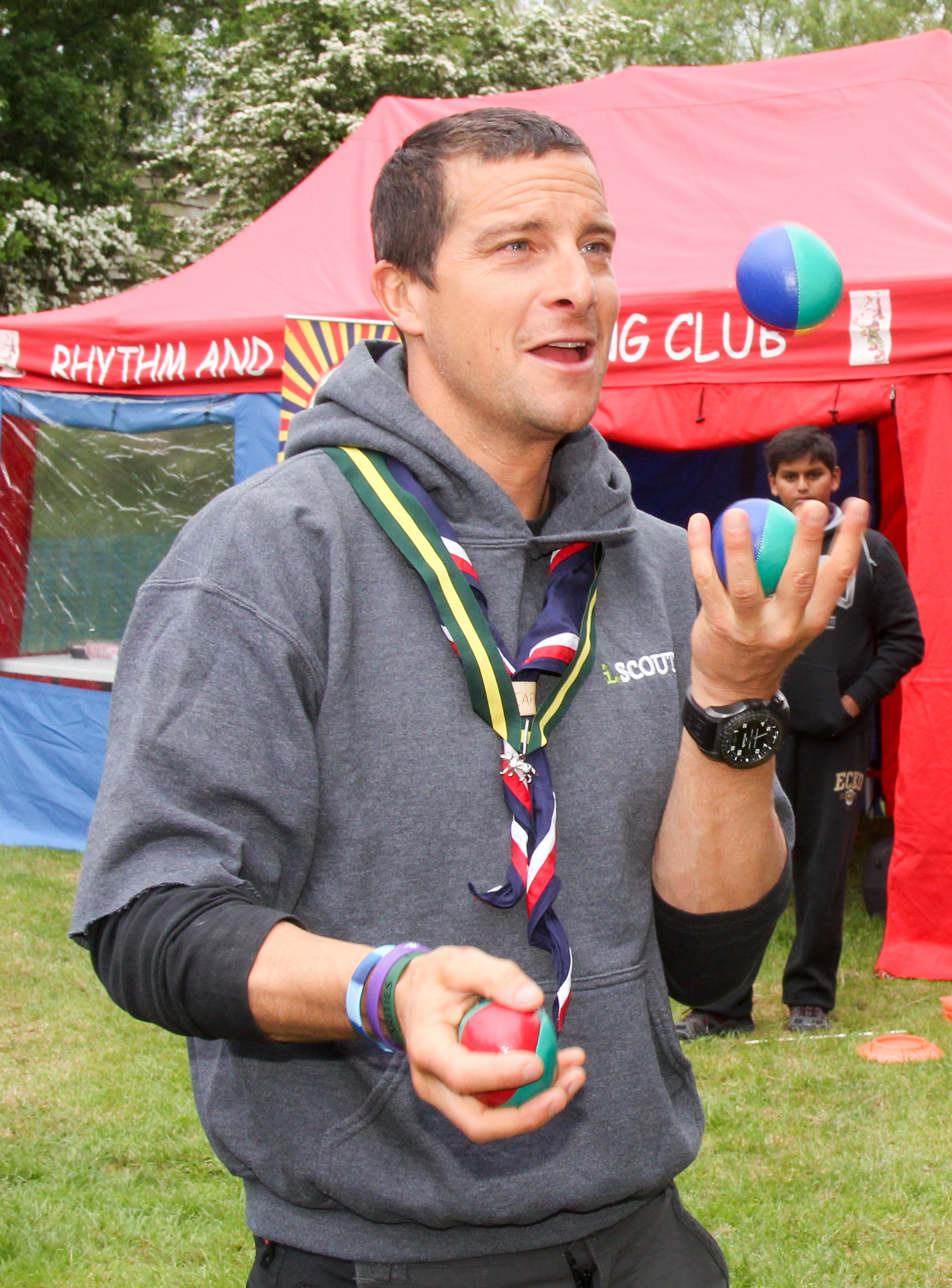
Bear Grylls juggling in 2016

=== Basic patterns ===
There are three basic patterns in toss juggling with many variations, some exceedingly complex, that are based on these basic patterns.

==== Shower ====

The shower is the most commonly depicted pattern in pictures and illustrations of jugglers (although often wildly exaggerated). The objects juggled follow a circular pattern with one hand doing higher throws and the other passing or doing low throws to the first hand. This pattern can be used to juggle an odd number or even number of objects. In siteswap notation, a three object shower would be called 51.

==== Cascade ====
The cascade pattern is often the first pattern taught to beginner jugglers. The objects juggled follow a horizontal figure of eight pattern with each hand throwing the object to the same height when the previous throw has reached it peak. This pattern is most commonly used to juggle an odd number of objects. In siteswap notation, a three object cascade would be called 3.

==== Fountain ====
The fountain is where each hand throws and catches objects and they do not transfer to the opposite hand. This pattern is most commonly used to juggle an even number of objects. In siteswap notation, a four object fountain would be called 4.

=== Advanced patterns and tricks ===

Besides the cascade (or reverse cascade), other toss patterns include the box or column, and any number of multiplex patterns or contact juggling tricks within the pattern.

There are also stunts such as the Yo-yo and the Robot, which give the illusion that the balls are connected to each other or to the juggler's body. By adding elementary skills to any juggling pattern the pattern can be increased, incrementally, in complexity.

There are even intricate patterns such as the Mills Mess, which is widely attributed to Steve Mills of The Dazzling Mills Family. For a given pattern any number of variants may occur to the juggler, for instance, Mills Mess has at least three well-known variants, produced by adding flourishes such as chops, holds, stalls, and carries. "Mills" colloquially refers to any pattern in juggling where the hands cross back and forth over one another. Any pattern valid in siteswap notation can be done "vanilla", reverse, and in Mills.

=== Other patterns ===
Below is a list of other common three-ball patterns.

- Burke's Barrage
- Rubenstein's Revenge
- Flash

== Performance ==
Toss juggling - street performance in Denmark

Juggling has been used as a performance skill for thousands of years. Toss juggling has been significant in such performances and has continued to be a major part of juggling performances up to the present day. Juggling performances are of two main types: a performance which shows off the technical skill of the juggler and a performance of juggling with comedy. These two main types can be performed as shows, as walkabout entertainment or as stationary freestyle entertainment. All types of performances can be accompanied by music, other circus skills or other performers.

== Passing and feeding ==
Passing is the juggling skill of throwing objects between two or more jugglers. The most common passing combination is where two jugglers throw six objects between them and perform various tricks in addition to that basic pattern. The number of objects juggled between two people can be increased with 7, 8 and even nine object passing being a common occurrence. Higher numbers have also been achieved with the current record for club passing being 13 clubs passed (juggled) between the two jugglers.

A variation on passing, called feeding, is performed by three or more jugglers. The most common combination is performed by three jugglers: one juggler (the feeder) passes alternately to each of the other two jugglers (the feedees) while they stand in a 'triangle'. The tempo of the juggling as well as the way the objects are thrown between the jugglers can be varied. Feeding can be performed with one feeder feeding multiple feedees or a mix of multiple feeders and feedees in one pattern.

Passing and feeding patterns and tricks in toss juggling range from the simple to the very complex. New patterns and tricks are developed and practiced at juggling conventions.

== Sport ==
As a sport, juggling can be done competitively, with the jugglers attempting to improve upon the tricks or performances of other jugglers within a range of disciplines and categories. Competitions are held for both solo and multiple juggling competitors. Jason Garfield popularised this form of juggling in the US. This style of juggling became more popular after he organised a World Juggling Federation competition in 2004 which has now become an annual event.

== Exercise and fitness ==
As exercise, juggling is a highly aerobic activity, increasing the heart rate and respiration. Juggling helps one to develop good hand-eye coordination, physical fitness and balance.

=== Reflexes ===
Juggling helps to develop quick reflexes, and in fact, jugglers develop "higher-order reflexes", reflexes not typically associated with normal human activity. These reflexes are formed through repetition of what are, at first, slowly learned and difficult processes. As the various processes develop into reflexive actions, additional, more difficult or complex skills are 'layered' atop previous, well-developed skills. These new more complex skills eventually become more reflexive, and eventually, various unusual high order reflexes develop. An example is that, while catching a raw chicken's egg may be quite challenging to a novice juggler, a more skilled juggler might be able to easily catch—unbroken—an egg thrown towards him without warning.

== Popularity ==
In 1990 it was estimated by the International Jugglers' Association that twenty-three percent of Americans can juggle a three-ball cascade.

== See also ==
- Catch (game)
- Joggling
- Juggling patterns and tricks for more toss juggling maneuvers.
