= Cigar box juggling =

Juggling of rectangular props that resemble cigar boxes

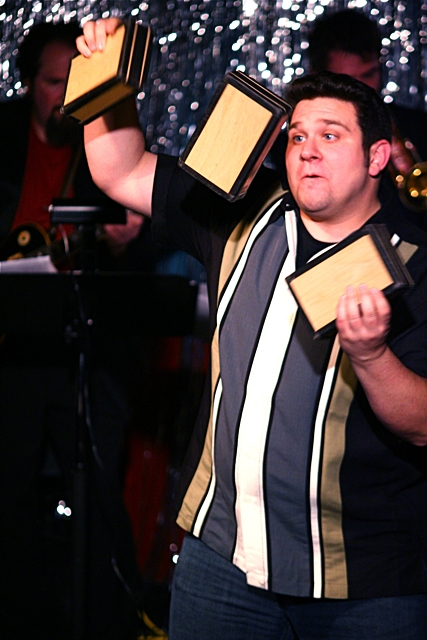
Larry Clark juggling with cigar boxes

Cigar box juggling is the juggling of rectangular props that resemble cigar boxes. Wood block manipulation was thought to have started by Japanese prisoners who were given small wood blocks as head rests for sleeping. Cigar box manipulation was developed as a vaudeville act in the United States between the 1880s and 1920s, and was popularized by W. C. Fields. Originally, performers would take actual boxes that cigars were stored in and nail them shut to create their juggling props. Today, cigar boxes for juggling are typically purpose-built, hollow wooden or plastic blocks with suede or foam rubber padding attached to the sides.

== Technique ==
Cigar boxes are juggled by holding a box in each hand and tossing and flipping a third box in between them. Routines performed with cigar boxes may also include quick midair box-exchanging tricks, balancing tricks, and more. Most tricks are done with three boxes; more advanced routines may include more than three.

Rather than the "flowing" style of ball juggling, cigar boxes have what is often referred to as a "stop-and-start" style. In effect, this means that after the majority of tricks the boxes return to the home position (three or more boxes in a line, smallest ends together) and stop before the juggler starts the next trick.

Most cigar box tricks are achieved by bouncing up and down (normally from the knees, keeping one's arms in the same place relative to one's body). The trick is started at the apex of the 'bounce' and the boxes are pinned in the home position on the downstroke, preferably at the same altitude at which they started. This leads to the visual effect of the boxes being connected by an invisible wire (in tricks where the boxes not involved in the trick are separate; see "take out" below) or it can appear as if the boxes are magnetic in some way (where two boxes remain 'stuck' together in the air; see "end round" below). This is just an illusion; the boxes are not in any way connected.

== Records ==
In 1977 Kris Kremo set a Guinness World Record of releasing one box and catching it after a quadruple pirouette. In 1994, Kristian Kristof broke the record by releasing all three boxes and catching them after a quadruple pirouette.

The world record for the most cigar boxes balanced on the chin is 223, set by Ashrita Furman at The Culture Project Theatre in New York City, New York, on 12 November 2006.

== Construction ==
Whereas vaudeville performers originally tended to use actual cigar boxes, today, the props for cigar box routines are usually built specifically for manipulation. They may be constructed from various materials, including plastic, plywood, or even wall paneling. They are sometimes padded on the ends and/or the sides with suede, foam rubber, or a felt-like material to provide extra friction on the catch. Foam yoga blocks are also the right size and shape.

== See also ==
- Circus skills
