= Juggling ring =

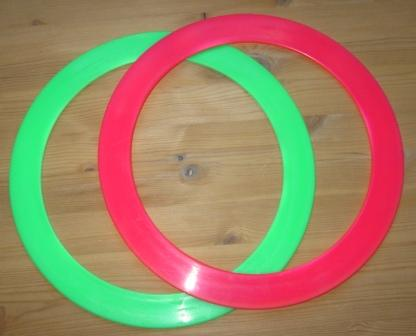

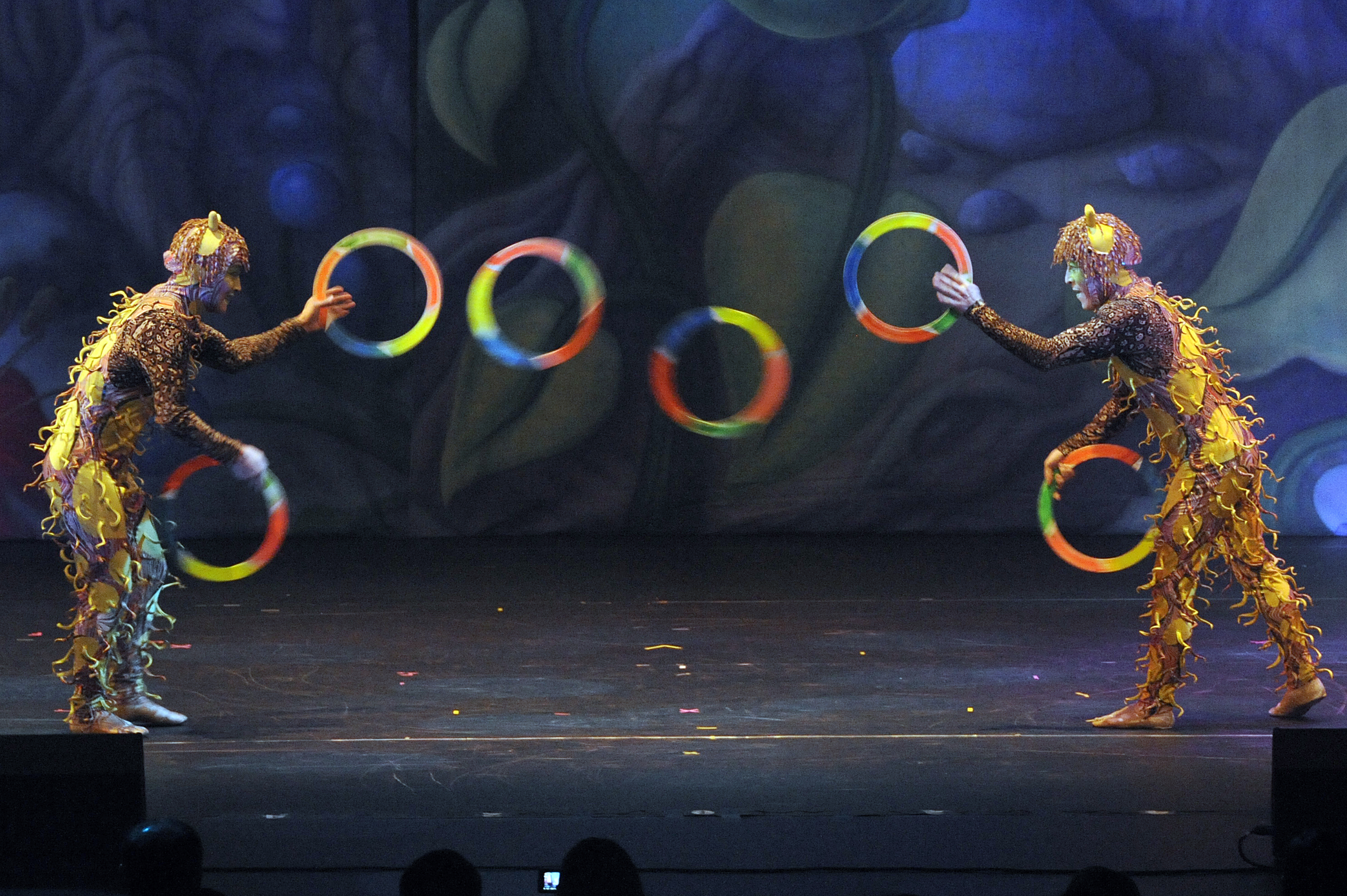

Juggling rings, or simply "rings", are a popular prop used by jugglers, usually in sets of three or more, or in combination with other props such as balls or clubs. The rings used by jugglers are typically about 30 centimetres (12 in) in diameter and 3 millimetres (0.12 in) thick.

Juggling rings are easier to juggle than clubs, but harder than balls due to size and throwing mechanics. Because of rings' impressive appearance for their level of difficulty, they remain a popular juggling item.

== Use in juggling ==
When juggled, rings are typically spun about their central axis. The resulting gyroscopic motion of the ring allows it to keep the same orientation after it is thrown. This property is utilized by performers to achieve various visual effects. For example, a performer might intentionally juggle some rings with the broad side to the audience and some others with the edge to the audience.

As with balls and clubs, the most basic patterns of ring juggling are the cascade and fountain. In these patterns, the left and right hands alternate throwing rings at approximately the same height. Some ball and club tricks can also be performed with rings, but their unique shape and spinning abilities result in a different visual effect.

Several patterns and tricks are unique to rings. For example, a spinning ring oriented vertically can be cradled and spun on a ring that is held horizontally. Rings can be spun along different axes resulting in a trick called "pancake flips." "Color change" involves rings colored differently on both sides, the performers catch the ring hand facing up and then throw the ring with the hand facing down, giving the appearance that the ring has changed. One of the most common tricks unique to rings is the "pull down." In this trick, usually used at the end of a performance routine, each of the rings is caught and placed over the performers neck in sequence.

Because of their thinness, light weight, and relative ease of collecting, rings are often used for juggling high numbers of props. Jugglers often wear gloves or other protection when juggling more than four rings, as the height of the pattern, thin cross-section and hard plastic of rings can act like blades and lead to chafing.

== In passing ==
It is possible, but not the norm, to pass rings in basic patterns such as four count and solids; for example, in the Cirque du Soleil production Corteo, the jugglers passed with multiple rings.

Since rings are circularly symmetric, two or more jugglers can rotate each ring by any degree around its axis of symmetry, thus resulting in a throw and catch that is independent of the number of turns the ring makes around its axis of symmetry. This contrasts with club juggling, which when passed in a normal passing pattern, do not rotate around their axis of symmetry.

== Records ==
The record for the most juggling rings juggled (where each prop is thrown and caught at least twice) is ten rings for forty-seven catches, by Anthony Gatto in 2006. The record for the most juggling rings flashed (where each prop is thrown and caught once in original cascade pattern) is 13 rings by Danil Lysenko in 2024. (13 rings video on YouTube)
