= Juggling club =

Equipment used by jugglers

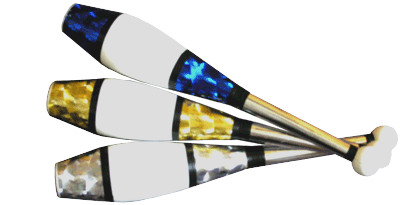
A set of juggling clubs

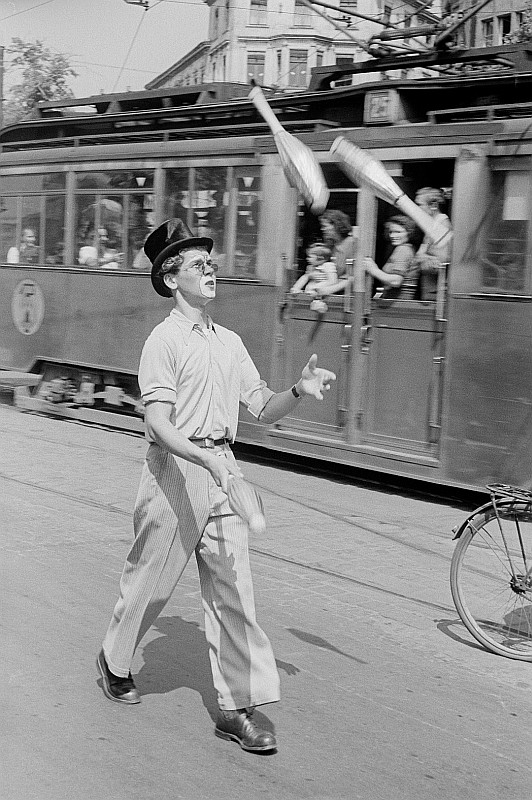
Juggler in Leipzig (1952)

Combat jugglers juggling clubs in Berlin, 2011

Juggling clubs are a prop used by jugglers. Juggling clubs are often simply called clubs by jugglers and sometimes are referred to as pins or batons by non-jugglers. Clubs are one of the three most popular props used by jugglers; the others being balls and rings.

A typical club is in the range of 50 centimetres (20 in) long, weighs between 200 and 300 grams (7.1 and 10.6 oz), is slim at the "handle" end, and has its center of balance nearer the wider "body" end. The definition of a club is somewhat ambiguous; sticks or rods are allowed under the current Juggling Information Service rules for juggling world records.

A juggling club's shape is similar to a bowling pin's and an Indian club's. Modern juggling clubs are, however, distinct from these objects because they differ in the materials they are made of, the way they are constructed, their weight and weight distribution, and are therefore not usually interchangeable.

== Types ==
Juggling clubs are manufactured from different materials and construction methods and can therefore be divided into a number of broad types.

=== Wood clubs ===
Early 20th century clubs were made entirely of wood: they had solid handles with large bodies which were hollowed to reduce weight. This style of club was manufactured by Edward Van Wyck and Harry Lind and are most often called American style juggling clubs because of their size and shape. In Europe, juggling clubs were constructed using solid cork bodies with wood handles or were very thin profiled solid wood clubs which were actually more stick-like in their construction.

=== Plastic clubs ===
With the invention of various plastics constructing juggling clubs was made easier and mass production of a variety of club sizes, shapes, weights and colours began.

==== One-piece clubs ====
One-piece plastic clubs are constructed as a single plastic moulded prop. The handle and body are therefore made from the same material and the club is hollow. One-piece clubs are very durable and are cheaper than composite or multi-piece clubs to make and buy. Despite these virtues, one-piece clubs are less popular among jugglers than multi-piece ones because the handles do not have any give making them occasionally more painful to catch.

==== Multi-piece clubs ====
Multi-piece or composite clubs are constructed using a number of parts of different materials. The core of the club is an internal rod, usually of wood but sometimes metal which provides a uniform structure about which the body and handle of the club can be attached. The body is made of a single moulded shape of plastic and the handle is made of a wrapping of either thin flexible plastic or sometimes cloth. The wrapped construction of the handle creates a more flexible grip making these clubs easier to catch during long periods of juggling. Foam ends attached to the top of the body and round or semi-conical knobs attached to the base of the handle protect the club's ends from impacts. This design was pioneered by Jay Green in the 1960s with off the shelf components. It was refined by Brian Dube, beginning in 1975 with the first custom production moulds. Multi-piece clubs are made in both a thin European style or larger bodied American style and in various lengths, generally ranging from 19 to 21 inches (480 to 530 mm).

==== Club decoration ====
Both one-piece and multi-piece clubs are often decorated with coloured tape or with specific decorations created by the club manufacturers. The range of decoration include full body and handle decoration in various colours including glitter variations and "European" decorations which only decorate parts of the club.

== Basic juggling ==
The basic pattern of club juggling, as in ball juggling, is the cascade. Clubs are thrown from alternate hands; each passes underneath the other clubs and is caught in the opposite hand to the one from which it was thrown. At its simplest, each club rotates once per throw but double, triple or multiple spins are frequently performed.

== Tricks ==
A wide variety of tricks which are beyond the normal cascade pattern are possible with clubs. Most ball-juggling tricks can be performed with clubs, though they are generally more difficult to learn because of the size of the clubs and the extra complexity added by their rotation. However, for tricks involving juggling a basic cascade under other constraints, such as while unicycling or blindfolded, club juggling is easier, given the lower accuracy required to make each catch.

=== Unique club tricks ===
Juggling clubs are used to perform unique tricks which are not possible with other juggling props like balls and rings. Examples of these include chin rolls, helicopter spins, various types of traps, and various types of throws unique to clubs because of the shape and spin of these props.

A flourish is a trick in which a performer spins the club around the fingers of one hand. The club actually makes two revolutions around its center of gravity, once on the medial side of the juggler's hand and once on the lateral side.

== Passing ==
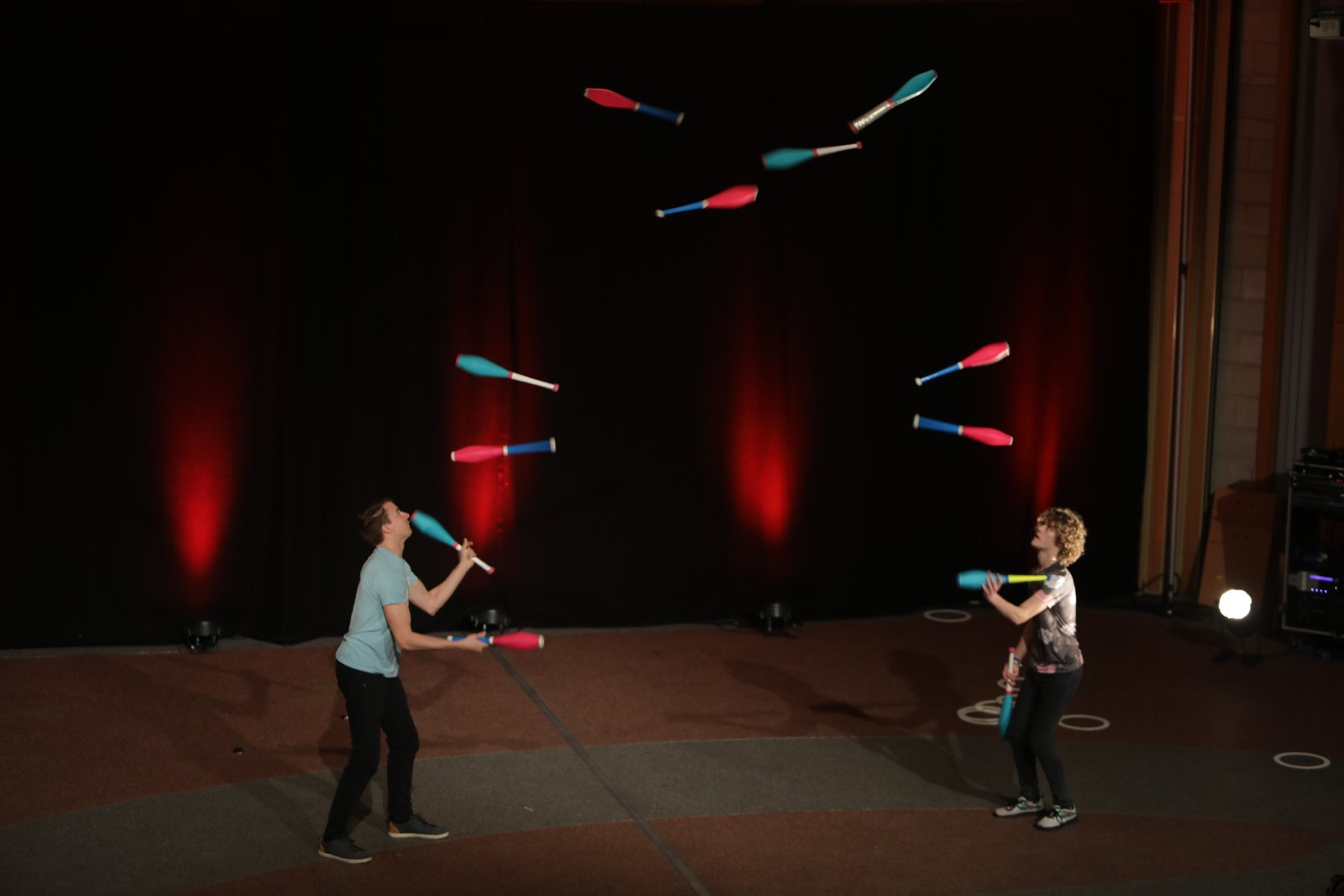
Julius Preu and Luca Pferdmenges passing 12 clubs

Clubs are the prop of choice for passing between jugglers. There are many reasons for this but some of the key ones are: juggling clubs have a larger catching area than balls; the variety of tricks that can be performed exceed either ball or ring passing; and they are visually more noticeable when viewed by an audience.

Beginners club passing is generally done with six clubs between two jugglers, each passing a single club to their partner every fourth beat. The passes are made from one juggler's right hand to the other juggler's left hand, so the clubs travel perpendicular to both jugglers. This basic pattern is called four count or every-others.

More advanced club passing can involve more objects, more jugglers and more intricate patterns. A notation for describing club passing patterns, called causal notation, was developed by Martin Frost of the Stanford Juggling Research Institute. The other main notation style is that of "four-handed siteswap"—a variation of basic siteswap.

== Combat/gladiators ==
Combat, often known as Gladiators in Europe, is a popular competitive group juggling activity. A "last man standing" competition, the participating jugglers maintain a base level of juggling, normally a three club cascade, within a limited area. Participants who drop a club, or go out of bounds, have lost the round and are expected to remove themselves (and their clubs if necessary) from the competition area. The rules of combat juggling vary from country to country and juggling convention to convention. The most common rules do not allow participants to deliberately come into body to body contact with each other but they are allowed to use their clubs to interfere with other participants' cascades. Multiple rounds may be played, with the winner being the first to win a set number of rounds, or the person with the most wins by a set end time.

== Records ==
The world record for most clubs juggled (i.e., longest time or most catches with each club at minimum being thrown and caught at least twice without dropping) is eight clubs for 16 catches, achieved by Anthony Gatto in 2006, Willy Colombaioni in 2015, Spencer Androli in 2022, and Moritz Rosner in 2023 (Moritz Rosner got 18 catches). The record for most clubs flashed (i.e., each prop thrown and caught only once) is nine, achieved by Eivind Dragsjø in 2016 (11 Catches).

== See also ==
- Baton twirling
