= Juggling pattern =

Specific manipulations of props while juggling

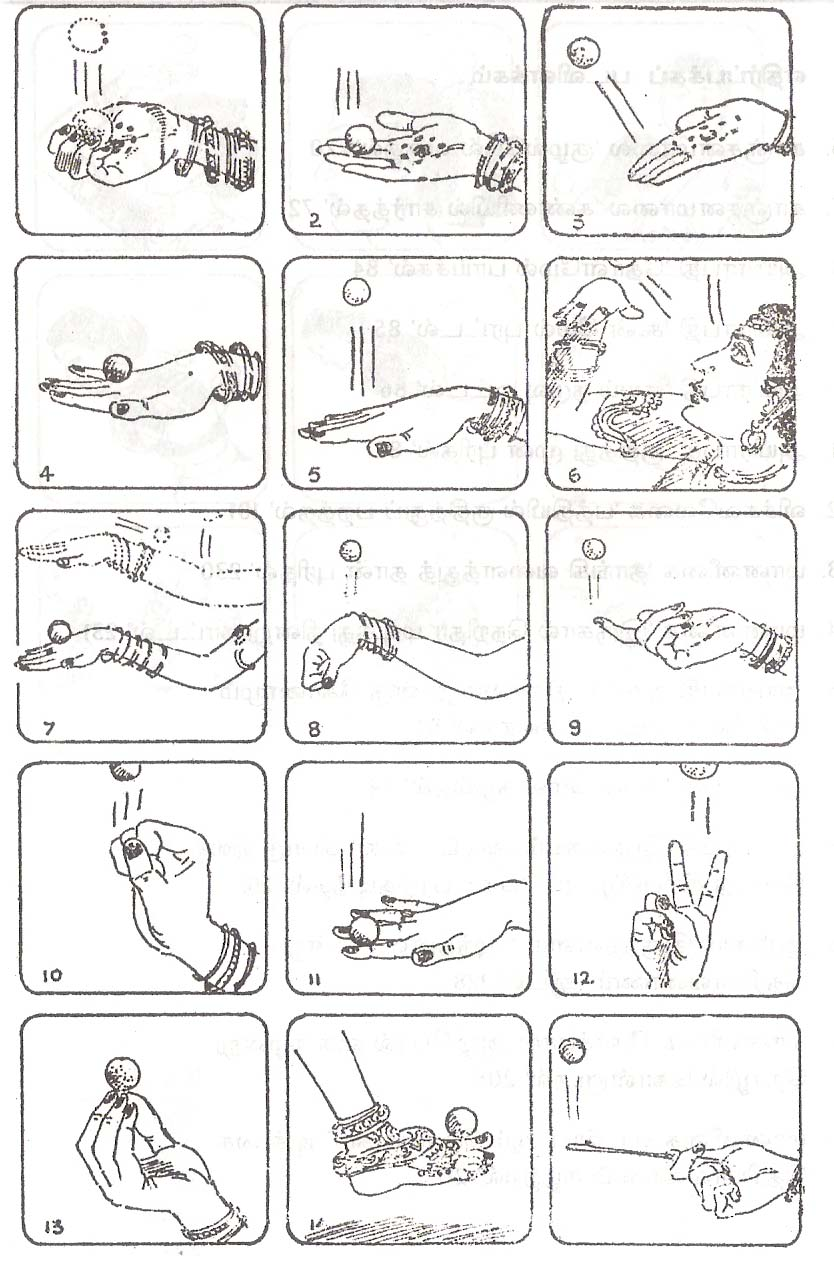
A variety of tricks involving a single ball being caught or tossed (7th century), which may then be incorporated into a variety of patterns

A juggling pattern or juggling trick is a specific manipulation of props during the practice of juggling. "Juggling, like music, combines abstract patterns and mind-body coordination in a pleasing way." Descriptions of patterns and tricks have been most common in toss juggling. A juggling pattern in toss juggling is a sequence of throws and catches using a certain number of props which is repeated continuously. Patterns include simple ones such as the cascade and complex ones such as Mills mess. A juggling trick in toss juggling is a throw or catch which is different from the throws and catches within a pattern. Tricks include simple ones such as a high throw or more difficult ones such a catch on the back of the jugglers neck, as well as the claw, multiplex, and pass. Systems of juggling notation have been created to describe juggling patterns and tricks. One of these is siteswap notation.

== Patterns ==
The variety of juggling patterns is extensive. Most patterns involve three or more objects and the props used can include balls, rings and clubs among other props. The basic patterns of toss juggling are the cascade, the shower and the fountain.

=== Cascade ===
3 ball-cascade, siteswap: 3

Possibly the simplest juggling pattern to execute, the cascade is a symmetrical pattern performed with an odd number of props greater than or equal to three, with each hand alternately throwing arching throws of equal height to the opposite hand. The cascade is generally performed with the balls caught to the outside of the throws, with the inverse known as a reverse cascade.

Many tricks or patterns are generated from mixing cascade and reverse cascade throws. For example, tennis (siteswap: 3) one ball is thrown over (reverse) while the other two are thrown under (inside).

=== Shower ===
3-ball shower, siteswap: 51

This pattern can be performed with any number of props greater than or equal to two. Quite often the first pattern attempted by non-jugglers, the shower has props following a "circular" path, with one hand throwing arcing throws of equal height to the opposite hand, and one throwing balls in a horizontal path to the other hand. Showers can be executed in both clockwise and anti-clockwise directions, and both asynchronously and synchronously.

=== Half shower ===
Animation of a four ball half-shower juggling pattern (siteswap 53) created with Juggling Lab

Similar to the shower pattern, a half shower pattern is any pattern where both hands throw arcing cascade-like throws to the other hand, but the props from one hand always pass above the props from the other hand. The half shower may be performed with any number of props greater than or equal to three. With more than four props, different versions of the half shower with varying heights of throws may be executed, even without taking into account both synchronous and asynchronous variations.

Half showers where hands throw at notably different heights may be executed with cascade-style inside throws; this style of half shower is popular in club juggling, where they go by the name of triple-doubles or double-singles due to the higher clubs naturally spinning a greater number of times than the lower clubs.

=== Fountain ===
4-ball fountain, siteswap: 4

Performed using an even number of props greater than or equal to four, the fountain is a symmetrical pattern where each hand independently juggles exactly half the total number of props, i.e. each hand always throws to itself. As with the cascade, a fountain where the throws are to the outside of the catches is known as a reverse fountain (siteswap: 4). A fountain where only one hand juggles is generally known as an n in one hand, where n is the number of props juggled. Unlike the cascade, fountains can be performed both synchronously (each hand throws at the same time) and asynchronously (hands throw alternately)

=== Columns ===
3-ball columns, siteswap: (4,4)(4,0)

Although various versions of this pattern exist, a columns pattern can be defined as one where the props follow vertical paths through the air. Columns can be performed with any number of props greater than or equal to two. The simplest version of this pattern, two-in-one, uses two balls in one hand while the simplest version of this pattern with three props which are thrown in three equally spaced columns, where the two outside props are thrown simultaneously, with the central prop thrown when the other two are caught. A Mills mess juggled in columns is known as a Boston mess (siteswap: 3).

=== Box ===
3-ball box, siteswap: (4,2x)(2x,4)

Box patterns are juggling patterns that combine vertical, columns-like throws with horizontal throws, such as in the shower pattern. Box patterns are so named due to the props in the pattern apparently tracing several sides of a box in the air, and can be performed with any number of props greater than or equal to two, synchronously (see right) or asynchronously (e.g. 612).

==== Half-box ====
Half-box, siteswap: 441

The half-box (siteswap: 441) is similar to the box and two in one hand. Described as, "not terribly difficult....the simplest non-obvious site-swap seems to be 441; it is similar to, but not the same as, the common 3-ball pattern of throwing balls up on the side while passing a ball back and forth underneath in a shower pass from hand to hand."

=== Mills mess ===
3-ball Mills Mess, siteswap: 3 (Note: Difficulty: 5/10)

The Mills mess (named after one of its originators, Steve Mills) is a symmetrical pattern performed with any number of props greater than or equal to three, in which the arms cross and uncross throwing the props from toward the centre of the pattern in groups of three. In a Mills mess pattern with an odd number of props, each throw is from one hand to the other, whereas with an even number of props, each hand independently juggles half of the props. Thus, a Mills mess can be considered to be a cascade or fountain but with the cross-armed movements.

=== 423 ===
423 path (4 is a one-hand fountain toss, 2 is a hold, and 3 is the toss between hands, which is then repeated with the opposite hands)

There are, "many 423 tricks." For example, the plain 423, (Note: Difficulty: 2/10) Takeouts, (Note: Difficulty: 4/10) the Fake Mess, (Note: Difficulty: 3/10) the W (or 423 columns), and Burke's barrage. In Burke's barrage the 3 is a carry, in Takeouts the 4 is a carry.

==== Burke's barrage ====
3-ball Burke's barrage, siteswap: 423

Named after its inventor, Ken Burke, Burke's barrage is quite popular among jugglers due to the impressive arm moves, but it's not so hard to master, compared to the Rubenstein's revenge for example; Burke's barrage is a, "complicated and very classy," juggling pattern. The 3 is a carry, 4 is thrown while crossed under, 3 is caught while crossed under, and 4 is often caught using the claw. The title is unrelated to juggler Luke Burrage, who named a pattern "Burke's Burrage" in Ken's honor.

=== Rubenstein's revenge ===
Rubenstein's revenge, siteswap: 52233

Rubenstein's revenge is a 3-ball pattern named by George Gillson after its inventor, Rick Rubenstein. Along with Mills Mess and Burke's barrage it is one of three well known named juggling patterns that involve complex carries and crossed arm throws. Rubenstein's revenge is usually considered the most involved and difficult of the three.

=== Windmill ===
Windmill juggling pattern (siteswap 3) animated with Juggling Lab

A windmill, or false shower, is a juggling pattern which resembles the shower. It is often considered a prerequisite or preparation for Mills Mess, or the other way around. One hand throws outside (or reverse cascade) and the other throws underarm, so that the outside hand catches while crossed over the underarm hand. Siteswap: 3.

== Pass juggling ==
Four-count, or "Every others": <333P|333P>

Siteswap may also be extended to pass juggling. Simultaneous juggling: <xxx|yyy> notation means one juggler does 'xxx' while another does 'yyy'. 'p' is used to represent a passing throw. For example, the Four-count, or "Every others", pattern (one of the most basic forms of passing) every fourth throw — that is, every second right-handed throw — is a passing throw, thus the pattern is <333P|333P>. One-count (<3p|3p>), two-count (<33p|33p>), three-count (<333p|333p>), four-count (<3333p|3333p>).

== Multiplex patterns ==
Multiplex: 3-ball Cascade with triplex

It is possible to create patterns in which two or more balls are caught in and/or thrown from one hand. These patterns are generally called multiplex patterns. Multiplex throws are given different names depending on the number of balls used, for example a two-ball throw would be called a duplex and a three-ball throw, a triplex, and so on. Multiplex throws are generally grouped into two categories, stacked multiplex and split multiplex.

=== Stacked multiplex ===
Stacked multiplex throws involve throwing two or more props from one hand and catching them in the same hand (though not necessarily the same hand that they were thrown from). The props will usually be "stacked" one above the other in the air, and thus will be caught in a staggered fashion. Stacked throws can replace any regular single prop throw within a pattern, though if the props are staggered enough they can be caught and thrown again separately; this type of stacked throw is known as a cut. The term cut was coined by Daniel Marden, a leading figure on multiplex juggling in the online juggling community. LibraryofJuggling.com has a trick named after him.

=== Split multiplex ===
Split multiplex throws, as the name suggests, involve throwing two or more props from one hand and "splitting" them in the air so that each hand catches one or more props. Some split props may be level in the air, and so may be caught simultaneously by both hands, or they may be of different heights, and so will be caught in a staggered fashion as with the cut stacked throw.

== Ladder diagrams ==
Cascade: 3

Shower (asynchronous): 51

Shower (synchronous): (4x,2x)

Fountain (asynchronous): 4 (Note: Difficulty: 7/10)

Fountain (synchronous): (4)(4)

Columns: (4,4)(4,0)

Columns, alternating: (4,4)(4x,0)

Box: (4,2x)(2x,4) (Note: Difficulty: 6/10)

Half-box: 441

Burke's barrage: 423

Rubenstein's revenge: 52233

53145305520

== See also ==
- Affine symmetric group, a mathematical object related to juggling patterns
- List of siteswaps
