= Cascade (juggling) =

Pattern in juggling

- Minimum prop #: 3
- Siteswap: 3
- Shannon: 12
- Period: 1
- Parity: odd
- Notes: symmetrical, asynchronous

Ladder diagram

Three depictions of the path traveled by balls in the pattern. Down arrows on the outside lines = cascade, up arrows = reverse.

In toss juggling, a cascade is the simplest juggling pattern achievable with an odd number of props. The simplest juggling pattern is the three-ball cascade, This is therefore the first pattern that most jugglers learn. However, although the shower requires more speed and precision, "some people find that the movement comes naturally to them," and it may be the pattern learned first. "Balls or other props follow a horizontal figure-eight [or hourglass figure] pattern above the hands." In siteswap, each throw in a cascade is notated using the number of balls; thus a three ball cascade is "3".

In the cascade, an object is always thrown from a position near the body's midline in an arc passing underneath the preceding throw and toward the other side of the body, where it is caught and transported again toward the body's midline for the next throw. As a result, the balls travel along the figure-eight path that is characteristic of the cascade.

—

"In the cascade...the crossing of the balls between the hands demands that one hand catches at the same rate that the other hand throws [synchronization]. The hands also take turns [coupled oscillation]..."

== Number of props ==
=== Three-ball ===
For the three-ball cascade the juggler starts with two balls in one hand and the third ball in the other hand. One ball is thrown from the first hand in an arc to the other hand. Before catching this ball the juggler must throw the ball in the receiving hand, in a similar arc, to the first hand. The pattern continues in this manner with each hand in turn throwing one ball and catching another.

All balls are caught on the outside of the pattern (on the far left and right) and thrown from closer to the middle of the pattern. The hand moves toward the middle to throw, and back towards the outside to catch the next object. Because the hands must move up and down when throwing and catching, putting this movement together causes the left hand to move in a counterclockwise motion, and the right hand to move in a clockwise motion.

This pattern is achievable with a wide array of props besides regular balls. Commonly used props are clubs, rings and scarves. Because of their slow falling speed due to high air resistance, scarves are often used as a first prop for beginning jugglers.

The cascade is only performed with an odd number of objects (3, 5, 7, etc.) The basic pattern for an even number of objects is the fountain.

=== Greater numbers ===
5-ball cascade

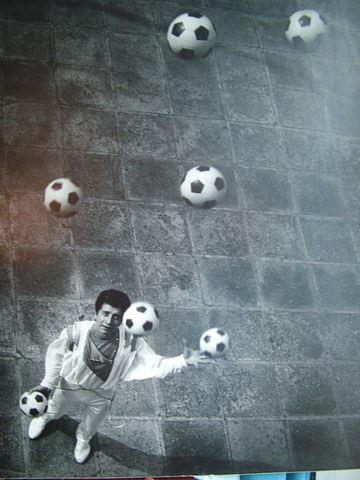
Valentin Chernov (1987), 7 prop cascade

When extended to higher numbers of props (five, seven, nine, etc.) the cascade maintains the basic pattern of throwing one prop before catching another on its way down. Higher numbers require the balls to be tossed higher into the air in order to allow more time for a complete cycle of throws. However, in order to keep the number of props in the juggler's hands to a minimum, it is necessary to begin the pattern by throwing, from alternating hands, all but one prop (in the same hand as the first throw, which started with one more prop than the other) before any catches are made.

== Reverse cascade ==
An illustration of the three-ball reverse cascade.

The reverse cascade, or outside cascade, is a juggling pattern in which the props follow the same path as the cascade, but with time going backwards, hence the 'reverse'. One throws every ball with, "an outward instead of an inward scoop," and throws, "every ball over the incoming ball rather than under it."

The pattern is performed with an odd number of props. As in the cascade, props are thrown from alternating hands and each prop is caught in the opposite hand from which it was thrown. The key difference between a regular cascade and the reverse cascade (from a juggler's point of view) is that one throws each object over rather than under the others, i.e., outside rather than inside.

While in a cascade objects are caught on the outside of the pattern (on the far left and right) and thrown from closer to the middle of the pattern, causing each ball to pass under the ball previously thrown, in a reverse cascade objects are caught near the middle of the pattern and thrown from the outside, causing each ball to pass above the ball previously thrown. Thus from the juggler's perspective the left hand moves in a clockwise motion, and the right hand in a counterclockwise motion.

The reverse cascade is generally considered to be more difficult to perform than the cascade, with a difficulty rating of 4 rather than 2 out of 10. The reverse cascade is, "perhaps the simplest," of, "several possible patterns that can be juggled with crossed arms."

== Tennis ==
Path traveled by balls in the tennis and reverse tennis patterns.

Many tricks or patterns are generated from mixing cascade and reverse cascade throws. For example, for tennis (siteswap: 3) one ball is thrown over (reverse) while the other two are thrown under (inside). One juggles, "a cascade with two balls while the 'tennis' ball is thrown [back and forth] over the top."

Reverse tennis is where one ball is thrown inside while the other two are thrown over.

== Chops ==
Chops is a juggling pattern based on the cascade, performed with 3 objects that involves a semicircular carry performed with either one or both hands (Single Chops/Double Chops). Chops can be performed continuously, by one or both hands, or in single instances.

The distinctive carry occurs at the moment of catch; rather than returning the ball into the cascade pattern the juggler carries the ball in their hand in a downward-pointing semicircle over the ball just thrown by the other hand, in the case of single chops, or over the other hand, in the case of double chops. At the end of the semicircular movement the carried ball is tossed virtually straight up to be caught by the other hand. The hand used to carry then quickly returns to its original position to catch the ball that was thrown by the other hand.

This pattern is of medium difficulty since very fast and controlled arm movements are necessary, though with practice, the pattern can actually be performed in a slow-looking motion.

== Variants ==
Named variants include the "overhead cascade" and a virtually infinite number of cascade patterns such as 522, 720, 900, 72222, and so on (see article on Siteswap notation).

== Shannon's theorem ==
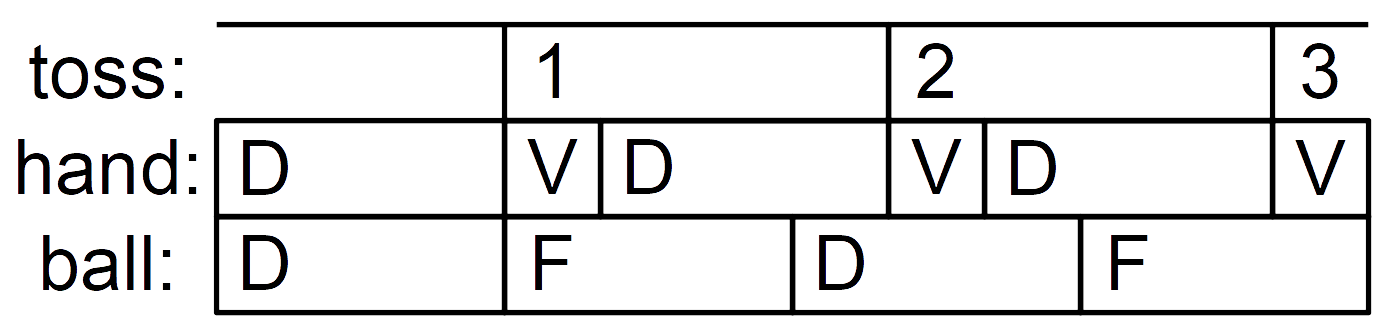
An illustration of Shannon's juggling theorem for the cascade juggling pattern

Cascade ladder suggested by Shannon's formula

Claude Shannon, builder of the first juggling robot, developed a juggling theorem, relating the time balls spend in the air and in the hands: (F+D)H=(V+D)N, where F = time a ball spends in the air, D = time a ball spends in a hand/time a hand is full, V = time a hand is vacant, N = number of balls, and H = number of hands. For example, a hand's and a ball's perspectives in the two-hand (H) three-ball (N) cascade pattern:

      1st 2nd 3rd
hand: D--VD—VD--V
ball: D--F--D--F--
      R     L

(F+D)H=(V+D)N
(3+3)2=(1+3)3
6×2=4×3
12=12
