= Juggling ball =

Spherical prop used in juggling

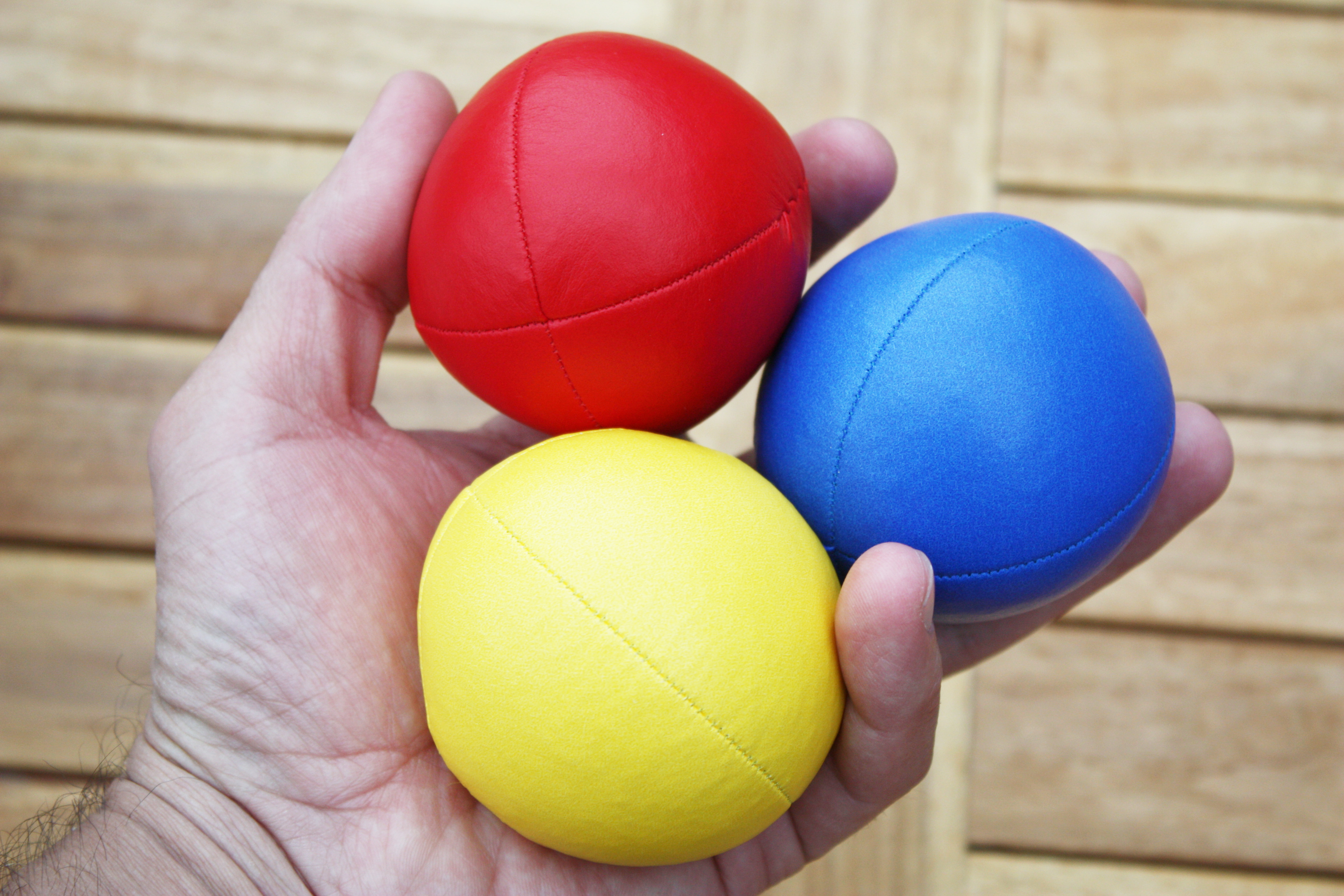
A set of juggling beanbags

Juggling balls, or simply balls, are a popular prop used by jugglers, either on their own—usually in sets of three or more—or in combination with other props such as clubs or rings. A juggling ball refers to any juggling object that is roughly spherical in nature.

== Types ==
Beanbags

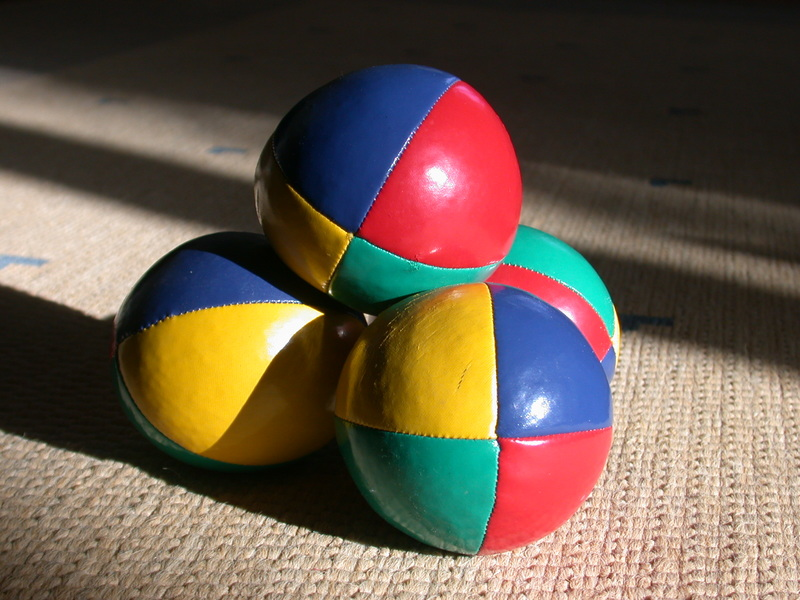
Vinyl "beach" beanbags

The most common type of juggling ball. Juggling beanbags are typically constructed with an outer shell made from several pieces of vinyl or microfiber (imitation leather), and filled with millet, birdseed, plastic pellets, sand, crushed rock, ground rubber, or other material designed to give the beanbag bulk. Beanbags come in a variety of colors, the most common being "beach" (a combination of 4 panels colored red, yellow, blue and green), white, and other combinations of colors that are easily visible. Beanbags are preferred by many jugglers because beanbags do not bounce or roll when dropped, are caught the most easily, and have reasonable pricing and availability. Beanbags are generally found in sizes ranging from bob 2.5"–3" in diameter, with weights of 90–130g. Smaller beanbags with less filling in them are sometimes used by numbers jugglers, who require a smaller and lighter ball so they can throw and catch many balls using the same hand.
Stage balls

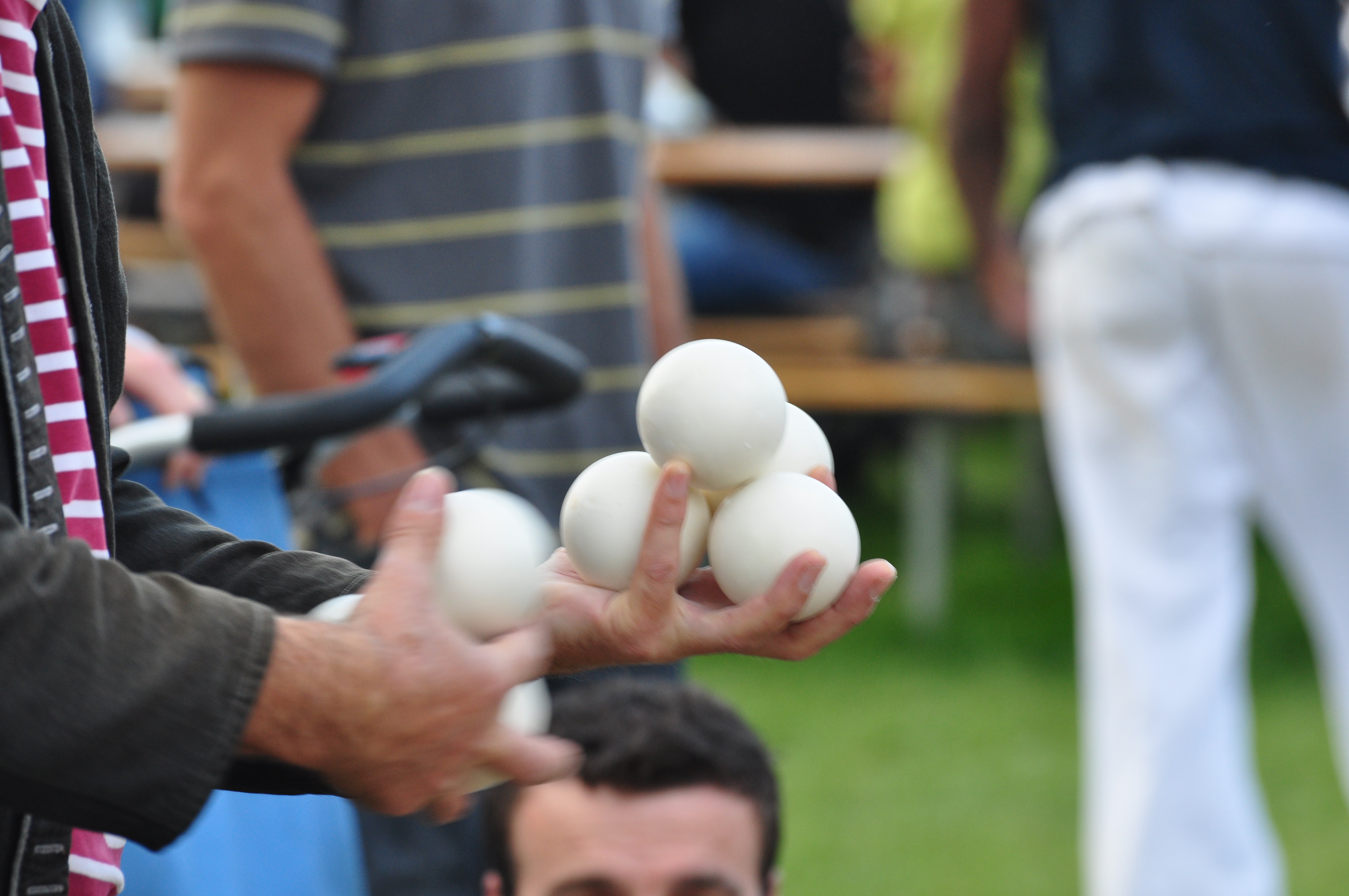
Stage balls in use

Often used during juggling performances, stage balls have a polished outer shell, typically made of plastic or hard rubber, and are hollow. For this reason, stage balls can be manufactured to a greater diameter than beanbags, whilst maintaining a more manageable weight for the juggler. Furthermore, stage balls hold their shape and color better than beanbags making them a more visual prop. Stage balls, however, tend to roll away when dropped, and therefore are not commonly used during practice. Stage balls are generally found in sizes ranging from 2.5"-4" in diameter, though many performers such as Sergej Ignatov have used balls larger than 4" when performing for extra dramatic effect.
DX/Russian balls
A style of juggling balls that combines many of the benefits of both beanbags and stage balls. DX balls are constructed with a hard PVC outer shell, similar to a stage ball, and are part-filled with millet seed, to give the ball a consistent weight. This produces a juggling ball that flies consistently in the air, and does not roll away when dropped. The DX ball is patented in the UK by Beard Enterprises Ltd.
Bouncing balls
Designed for bounce juggling, these feature a 75–90% bounce return. They are made of silicone or a synthetic rubber compound.
Silicone balls
A type of bouncing ball most commonly used during bounce juggling and stage performances. These balls are made of silicone and have the same clean appearance as stage balls, a surface which is easy to grip and catch, and have a consistent, high bounce. Silicone balls are also easier to clean than stage balls, which can often scuff permanently. Unfortunately, these balls often cost 5–7 times more than beanbags or stage balls, which often limits the use of these balls to performers and serious hobbyists. Many jugglers choose to use non-silicone bouncing balls instead, due to their far cheaper price and similar performance.
Russian balls
These share some of the advantages of stage balls (rigidity, visibility) and some advantages of beanbags (dead drop). They have a thin shell, and most of the weight is provided by a filling of granular material (most commonly sand or salt). This gives them slightly unusual flight characteristics, but the low centre of mass makes them well suited for catches using other parts of the body than hands. Russian balls are sometimes home-made since the materials needed are cheap. This makes them well-suited for experimentation regarding different sizes and weights, with the main limitation being the availability of the shells. Play, from Italy, makes similar balls with a soft and slightly thicker shell, partially filled with liquid silicone or fine sand.

== Use ==
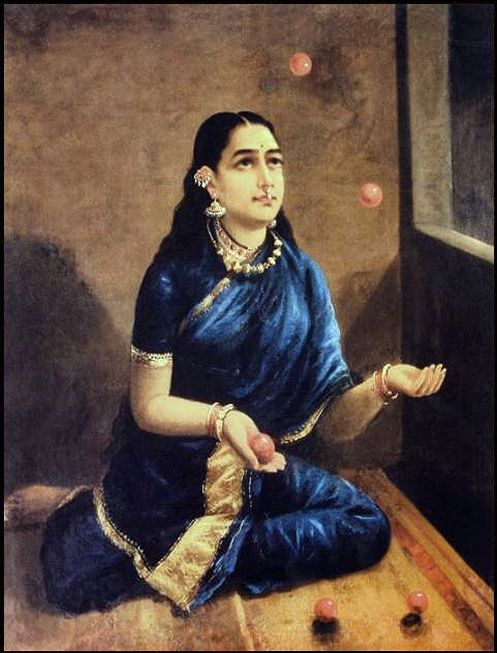
Raja Ravi Varma (1848–1906) Lady Juggler

Juggling balls are usually the first props that beginners attempt to juggle with, due to their simplicity (compared to other juggling props such as clubs) and availability. Additionally, many common types of balls can function as juggling balls for a beginning juggler (such as tennis balls or baseballs). Most novice jugglers often spend much time learning how to juggle three balls before moving on to other juggling props. However, some jugglers prefer to focus on only one juggling prop in order to achieve "mastery" of one art.

For the more advanced juggler, juggling balls are often used to demonstrate basic patterns such as the cascade, fountain, shower and half-shower, and can be used to form more creative juggling patterns as well, such as patterns involving throws around the body, blind throws or catches, and throwing or catching with parts of the body other than the hands. Many advanced jugglers can juggle seven or more balls at once, but not seven or more rings or clubs. This is because juggling balls are the easiest to juggle, can be manufactured (or home-made) in small sizes and light weights, and beanbags can be underfilled to facilitate catching.

However, some juggling tricks, such as those typically done with clubs or rings that involve spinning or twirling the prop are impossible or not as effective with balls, since a juggling ball appears the same from whichever angle it is viewed. The use of juggling balls in passing is, for this reason, less popular than the use of clubs, since the spin of the clubs in the air is often one of the appeals of passing with juggling clubs. Clubs are also larger and therefore easier to catch when thrown from a great height or distance.

Juggling balls can also be used for contact juggling, a form of juggling in which the juggler never throws the objects. Typically, the contact juggler will use stage balls or balls specifically designed for contact juggling.

== Records ==
The record for the most juggling balls juggled (where a "juggle" is defined as at least two throws and catches of each prop) in toss juggling is eleven (Alex Barron, 2012, 25 catches). The record for most balls juggled in bounce juggling is ten. Enrico Rastelli is also widely reported to have been able to juggle ten balls in the 1920s. The record for the most juggling balls flashed (where each prop is thrown and caught once) is fourteen, by Alex Barron on April 19, 2017.
