= Bean bag =

Sealed bag containing dried beans or pellets

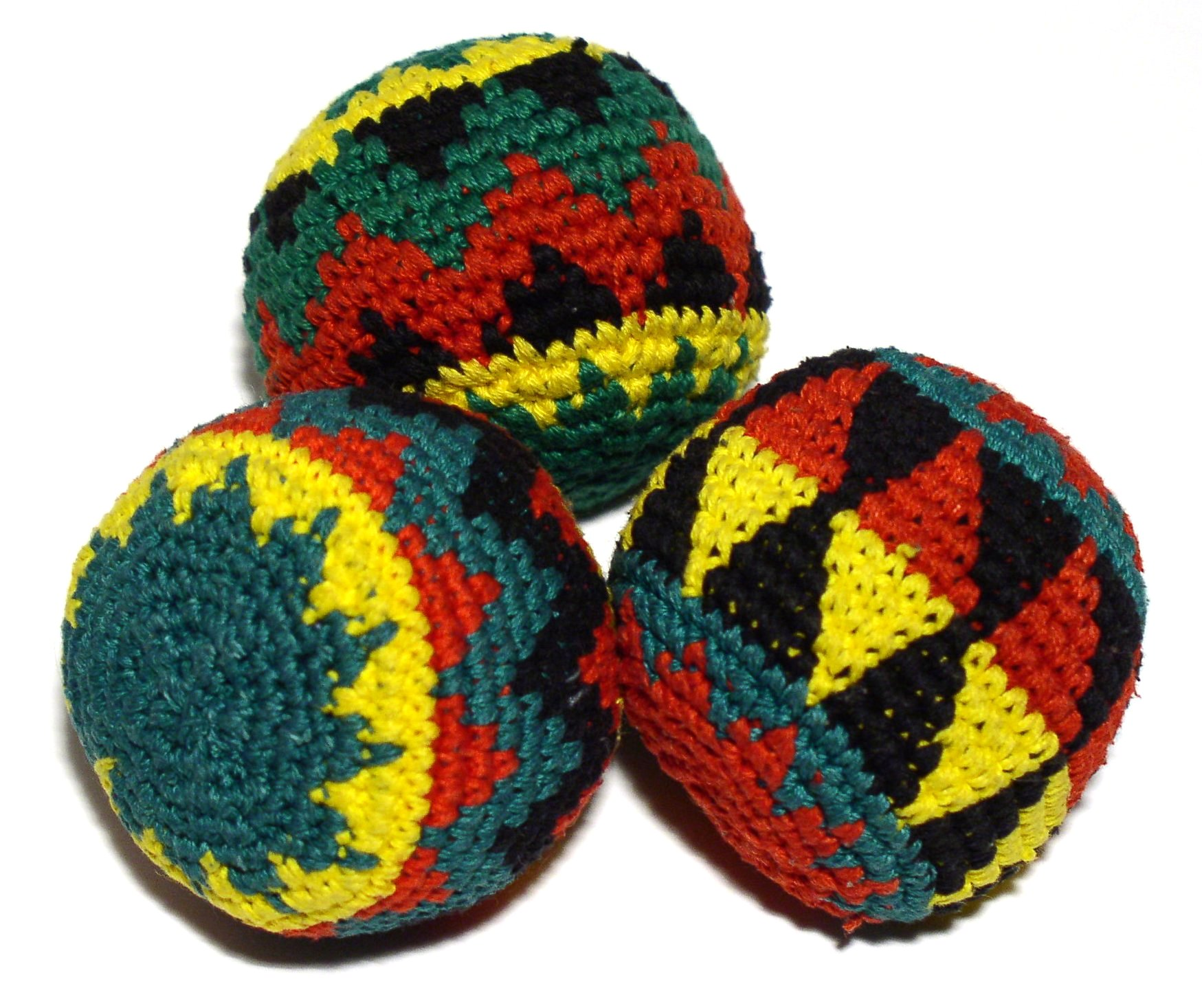
Small bean bags are commonly used as juggling props.

A bean bag (also beanbag) is a sealed bag containing dried beans, PVC pellets, expanded polystyrene, or expanded polypropylene. The bags are commonly used for throwing games, but they have various other applications.

== Games ==
People playing footbag

- Beanbag was a game referred to at the turn of the twentieth century by Finley Peter Dunne as the antithesis of roughness of politics, Politics ain't beanbag!.
- Cornhole is a bean bag tossing game similar to horseshoes and quoits, played with bean bags and two goals.
- Footbag (also known as Hacky Sack, a trademark) is a type of ball-shaped bean bag that is used to play various games.
- Bean bags are also commonly used for juggling.
- In gridiron football beanbags are used to mark the point of a change of possession (where a punt or kickoff is caught, an interception is made, or a fumble occurs)
- Bean bags are often used for a game similar to dodgeball where small square bean bags are slid across the floor with the object to hit the opposing team's players in the foot. The game is particularly popular in American elementary schools as a safer alternative to dodgeball.

== Other uses ==
- In benchrest and long-range shooting, bean bags or "shooting bags" are often used to support the gun's fore-end and buttstock, and allows the shooter to fine-adjust the aim by gently squeezing the rear bag.
- Clutching technology for robots makes use of bean bags.
- Smaller bean bags can be used to stabilize a camera when a tripod is not available.
