= Fountain (juggling) =

- Minimum prop #: 4
- Difficulty: 7/10, 4 (note: difficulty ratings are arbitrary and subject to change)
- Siteswap: 4
- Shannon: 4
- Period: 1
- Parity: even
- Notes: asymmetrical, synchronous or asynchronous

Ladder diagram for asynchronous fountain: (4)

Ladder diagram for synchronous fountain: (4)(4)

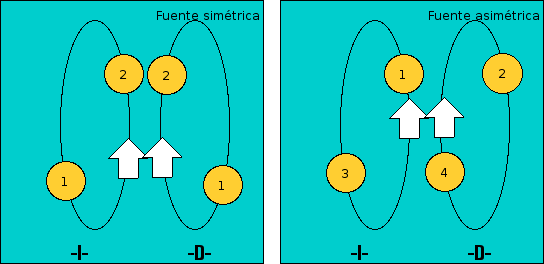
Symmetric and asymmetric fountains

The fountain is a juggling pattern that is the method most often used for juggling an even number of objects. In a fountain, each hand juggles separately, and the objects are not thrown between the hands, thus the number of balls is always even since any number of balls in one hand is doubled by the same number in the other hand. To illustrate this, it can be seen that in the most common fountain pattern where four balls are juggled, each hand juggles two balls independently. As Crego states "In the fountain pattern, each hand throws balls straight up into the air and each ball is caught in the same hand that throws it."

A fountain can be synchronous or asynchronous. In a synchronous fountain, both hands throw at the same time, while in an asynchronous fountain, the hands alternate throws. "The fountain pattern...can be stably performed in two ways...one can perform the fountain with different frequencies for the two hands, but that coordination is difficult because of the tendency of the limbs to synchronize." The fountain is juggled in a circular fashion, distinguishing it from columns. The circular method means that the balls juggled travel in a circle-like motion with the jugglers hands throwing the ball from a point close to their body centre line and catching the ball further away from their body centre line. This circular motion is called 'outside circles' and is the fountain pattern shown in the animation. This circle method can be reversed to create an 'inside circle' pattern whereby throws are from a position away from the body midline and catches are closer to the body midline. In the columns method the balls all travel vertically up and down in their own 'column', and are caught from where they are thrown.

== Other fountain patterns ==
4 is the asynchronous asymmetrical fountain. (4,4) is the synchronous fountain. (4,4)(4,0) is a synchronous fountain with one ball missing (two in one, one in the other).

Wimpy, (4x,4x), is a crossing version of the synchronous fountain.
