= List of jugglers =

A juggler is a person who practices object manipulation for entertainment, sport or recreation. Famous professional jugglers have come from many countries and have performed their skills live in circuses, variety theatres, casinos, cruise ships, festivals, street venues and on television. The following is a list of jugglers who are notable for professional success as a performer, world records, official competition titles or the invention of patterns or tricks.

== Australia ==
- Space Cowboy

== Austria ==
- Christoph and Manuel Mitasch – as a duo, they hold multiple world records for numbers of clubs passed.

== Canada ==
- Wilfred Dubois (b. 1892)

== Czech Republic ==
- Alan Šulc – holds multiple world records for numbers in bounce juggling.

== Germany ==
- Francis Brunn – numerous appearances on stage and television.
- Lottie Brunn – believed to be the fastest female juggler.
- Paul Cinquevalli
- Thomas Dietz
- Luca Pferdmenges – multiple Guinness World Record holder and social media influencer.

== Hungary ==
- Trixie – known as 'the first lady of juggling'. Appearance on stage and film.

== Italy ==
- Enrico Rastelli – a former holder of multiple world records.

== Netherlands ==
- Niels Duinker – comedy juggler and holder of multiple Guinness World Records.

== New Zealand ==
- Mike the Juggler – Wellington busker.

== Russia (or the former USSR) ==
- Vova and Olga Galchenko – brother and sister juggling team who won the Team Club Passing competition at the World Juggling Federation in 2006.
- Sergej Ignatov – former holder of various world records. Many appearances in circuses and on stage.

== United Kingdom ==
- Alex Barron – holds multiple world records for number of balls juggled.
- Sean Gandini – holds multiple world records for number of rings passed.
- Rod Laver – notable for ping pong ball juggling routine. Numerous appearances on stage and television worldwide.
- Haggis and Charlie – juggling performers, teachers and authors. Appearances at festivals, stage and television.
- Erwyd le Föl (real name Russel Erwood) – originally from Bristol, UK, Erwyd is one of the world's few remaining official jesters and frequently uses juggling in his shows.

== United States ==
- Michael Davis – juggler and comedian who performed on multiple television shows during the 1980s.
- W.C. Fields – Actor and vaudeville performer.
- The Flying Karamazov Brothers – juggling and comedy troupe who have been performing since 1973.
- Jason Garfield – president of the World Juggling Federation.
- Anthony Gatto – juggler from New York who holds several juggling awards. Gatto became the first and so far only juggler to win the prestigious Golden Clown award at the 24th International Circus Festival of Monte-Carlo.
- Michael Goudeau – former circus clown and frequent collaborator of Penn Jillette.
- Ronald Graham – mathematician who published several papers on siteswapping, instructor who taught Steve Mills, and former president of the International Jugglers' Association.
- Galen Harp – co-founder of the Institute of Jugglology
- Penn Jillette – acting as half of the duo Penn & Teller, Jillette incorporates his juggling skills into their magic act.
- Albert Lucas – holds certain world records for number of objects juggled. Club juggling trick 'Alberts' and by association 'Treblas' named after him.
- Marcus Monroe – comedian and juggler, 2012 winner of the Andy Kaufman Award.
- Bobby May – vaudeville-era juggler most known for juggling while ice skating.
- Steve Mills – inventor of the juggling pattern Mills Mess.
- Michael Moschen – popularised contact juggling in 1990s.
- Ellen Winters – co-founder of the Institute of Jugglology
