= Vova and Olga Galchenko =

Russian juggling team

Vova & Olga Galchenko
- Born: Vladimir & Olga Galchenko; Vova: September 15, 1987 (age 38); Olga: July 31, 1990 (age 35); Penza, USSR
- Occupations: Jugglers, software engineers
- Website: www.galchenko.com

Vladimir (born September 15, 1987), known as Vova, and Olga Galchenko (born July 31, 1990) were a brother and sister juggling team originally from Russia, active from approximately 2001 to 2009. They specialized in club juggling, particularly technical solo juggling, technical club passing and numbers club passing.

== Biography ==
Vladimir Vasilievich Galchenko, known as Vova, and his sister Olga Vasilievna Galchenko are originally from Penza, Russia, and both started juggling at a very young age. At age seven, Vova joined a circus school. (Note: Fagone's article in New York Times asserts that Vova entered circus school at age four.) Olga joined the circus school several years later. Vova Galchenko is one of two jugglers that have successfully executed a 7 club 7 up 360 (i.e. while juggling 7 clubs, throw them all in the air, turn around through 360 degrees, and catch them all).

With the encouragement of their parents, Vova and Olga began performing together. In 2001, their father began filming them performing tricks and posted the videos on a website. They soon began receiving invitations to perform abroad. Vova and Olga soon became widely known in the European juggling community for their high level of technical ability, both on and off stage, especially as they were both very young. Even at the ages of 12 and 15 they were featured performers at many large juggling conventions and festivals in Europe, including the British Juggling Convention 2002, Dresden Juggling Convention 2002 and 2003, the European Youth Circus Festival 2002 and the European Juggling Convention 2003. They also performed at the Israel and Japan juggling conventions.

In 2003 they moved from Russia to the United States, where they settled in Los Angeles and began working with Jason Garfield to improve their technical skills. Also in July 2003 they travelled to the International Jugglers' Association Summer Festival in Reno, Nevada. Many expected them to win all three stage championship categories (Individual, Junior and Team). However, due to their lack of experience on a competition stage, they failed to take gold in any category, though as a team they won a silver medal, and many awards in other events.

In December 2004 they also took part in the first World Juggling Federation competition in Las Vegas, Nevada. Vova won the Advanced Clubs, Five Club Moves, Three Club 360s and Five Club 360s competitions, and came second in the only other event he entered. Olga won the Junior Clubs and came second in the Women's Advanced Clubs. Together they won the Teams Six Club and the Teams Seven Plus.

In 2005, the siblings' partnership began to splinter, in part because Olga wanted to concentrate on school. Vova began performing on his own.

In the 2006 World Juggling Federation competition in Las Vegas, Nevada, Vova and Olga won the Team Club Passing competition. This was their first performance as a pair in competition for one and a half years. Vova also competed individually and won the Endurance - Clubs, 5 Ball 360s (together with Thomas Dietz), 3 Club 360s, 5 Club 360s, 5 Ball Freestyle, 7 Ball Freestyle, 3 Club Freestyle, 5 Club Freestyle competitions.

== Juggling style and records ==
The Galchenko siblings are known within the juggling world as being "obsessive" about perfecting their technical skills. Penn Jillette asserts that "if you're talking about club passing, the two of them together are the best in the world. Not just the best in the world. The best there has ever been." Writing in Time, Lev Grossman describes their performance as "beautiful--a kind of kinetic sculpture, a bravura display of human determination bringing order to the chaotic physical world." According to Jason Fagone in The New York Times, Vova "is able to blur the transitions between tricks so completely that it often seems as if he’s not doing tricks at all".

Unlike many other jugglers, however, the siblings do not excel at performing; they do not banter on stage or veer towards comedy. This is, in part, due to Vova's almost crippling stage fright. Vova, who has earned the nickname "The Russian Robot" for his refusal to try to engage his audiences, maintains that juggling has nothing to do with artistry: "There’s nothing you can express through juggling. It’s just throwing and catching ...". Because their interests lie in the technical aspects of the discipline rather than entertainment, they joined the World Juggling Federation, whose mission is to transform juggling into a sport.

Olga and Vova previously held several juggling world records for team club passing. Some of their records included:

- Ten Clubs - 378 passes caught
- Eleven Clubs - 152 passes caught
- Twelve Clubs - 54 passes caught

== Other endeavors ==
Vova and Olga Galchenko have recently shifted their focus somewhat away from juggling in pursuit of other ambitions. The siblings studied Computer Engineering and Computer Science at rival universities in Los Angeles: Olga at UCLA, and Vova at USC. Both have had some success in their studies. Most notably, Vova has released a number of iPhone applications, one of which is geared towards jugglers. Since 2012, Vova has been working at Box.

== See also ==
- List of jugglers
