= Modern juggling culture =

Since the late 1980s, a large juggling culture has developed, revolving around local clubs and organizations, special events, shows, magazines, video sharing websites, Internet forums, juggling competitions and juggling conventions. Populating the scene are many juggling celebrities who are notable for being good or creative jugglers, entertaining performers, convention organizers, experts in their field, having a strong presence online or just for having an interesting personality, character or style.

When you pulled out three balls in 1973, what was going through people's minds was, 'I saw a deformed midget do that once.' But when you pulled out three balls in the '80s, it was, 'a guy in my dorm room used to do that.'

— Penn Jillette

It has developed into a fully formed subculture, with tens of thousands of followers.

== Clubs and organizations ==
Most cities and large towns have juggling clubs, where anyone is welcome to learn and share skills. Many universities and colleges have juggling or circus skills societies. There are also many community circus groups that usually aim to teach young people and put on shows.

The first organization to promote juggling and help jugglers was the International Jugglers' Association (IJA), based almost entirely in North America but which has run events on almost every continent in the world since 2011. The World Juggling Federation (WJF) promotes more technical juggling, in contrast to the performance and entertainment emphasis of the IJA. The European Juggling Association facilitates the annual European Juggling Convention and promotes juggling in Europe. Various countries have national associations, including Italy, Israel, Spain, and Switzerland. There is also the Christian Jugglers Association.

== Magazines ==
Kaskade was a European juggling magazine, published in both English and German. It was discontinued in 2013 and all its issues were made available online. Juggle was the official publication of the IJA, which on the North American scene. This publication was preceded by the IJA's Juggler's World and Juggler's Bulletin. Juggling Magazine is published in Italy and Newton Las Pelotas is published in Argentina and Spain for the Latin American readership.

== Events ==
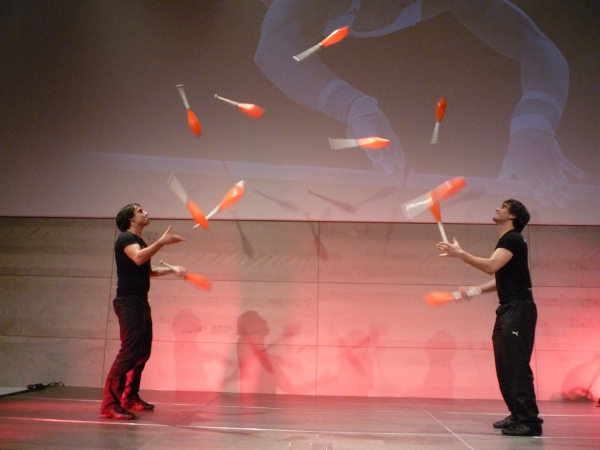
Manuel and Christoph Mitasch passing clubs

World Juggling Day is the Saturday nearest 17 June (the day the IJA was founded in 1947). There are events organized worldwide to teach people how to juggle, to promote juggling, or for jugglers to get together and celebrate.

Many countries, cities, or juggling clubs hold an annual juggling convention. These are the backbone of the juggling scene, because the events regularly bring jugglers from a wide area together. The attendance of a convention can be anything from a few dozen to a few thousand people. The principal focus of most juggling conventions is the main hall, where anybody can juggle, share tricks or try out multi-person passing patterns. There will often be more formal workshops, in which experts work with small groups on skills and techniques. Most juggling conventions also include a big show (open to the general public), competitions, and juggling games. Many juggling conventions host some kind of renegade show, an open stage where anyone can perform at short notice. The Juggling Edge maintains a searchable database of past and upcoming conventions.

== Objects ==
Modern technical juggling has moved away from the more dangerous objects, including the chainsaw and machete. These objects are still seen with great frequency on the street and stage, though are seldom represented in the IJA's stage competitions. Juggling with flaming torches remains a crowd favourite and is regularly used by jugglers in the modern day. While beginners mainly use balls, both clubs and rings also remain staples of juggling. The objects available to any juggler are only limited by weight, imagination, and pain tolerance.

== See also ==
- Anthony Gatto
- Jason Garfield
- Juggling convention
