= The Passing Zone =

American comedy-juggling duo

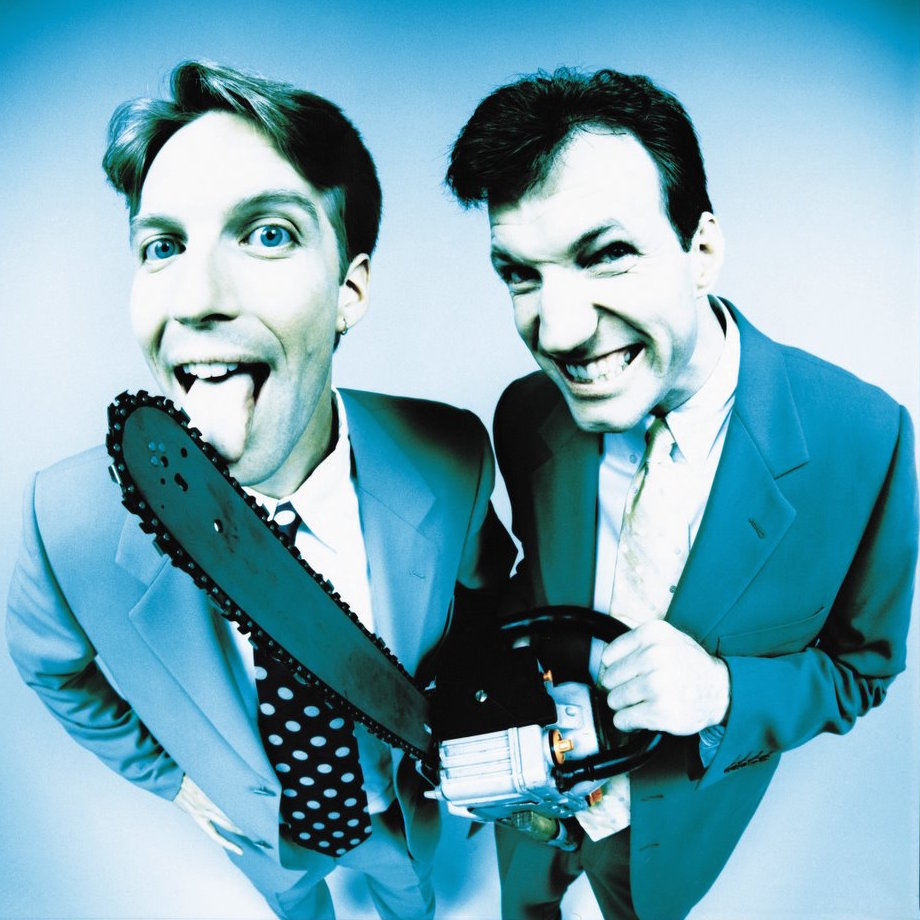
- Jon Wee (left) and Owen Morse in an undated publicity photo
- Born: Jonathan Wee; Owen Morse; Minnesota; California

Comedy career
- Genres: Comedy; juggling
- Website: www.passingzone.com

The Passing Zone is an American comedy-juggling duo comprising Jon Wee and Owen Morse. Wee, originally from Minnesota, and Morse, a California native, met at a juggling convention in northern California in 1986 and decided two years later to team up. Since then, the Passing Zone has won 18 gold medals from the International Jugglers' Association (IJA) and holds five Guinness World Records.

The Passing Zone was one of ten finalists out of hundreds of acts to perform during the debut season of NBC's America's Got Talent where, despite finishing as "the highest rated comedy act," Wee and Morse "lost one million dollars to Bianca Ryan." They also appeared during the 11th Season of NBC's America's Got Talent, where they were eliminated in the semifinals. They have entertained as part of the Royal Variety Performance for England's Prince Charles—sharing the bill with Tony Bennett and the cast of Riverdance, among others—and also have been "guest performers" at the White House. The Passing Zone performs regularly for some of the top corporations in the United States while "inspiring groups to be better teams."

== Biography ==
Jonathan Wee is one of three children of David and Karen Wee and was raised in Northfield, Minnesota. A performer since age 14, Wee preferred to juggle with partners. He performed with two childhood friends, calling themselves Three of Clubs, and worked the Minnesota Renaissance Fair. Wee admits that they "were really pretty bad," although in the end he figures that fair officials "thought, 'we'll let them in.'" Owen Morse, of Tustin, California, began performing in high school, crafted a 15-minute-long, sports-themed routine set to music, and eventually earned work through an agency in Hollywood, playing the Sawdust Festival in Laguna Beach while in high school and working at Disneyland while in college.

A mutual friend introduced Wee and Morse at a jugglers' convention in San Jose, California, and they spent the next year corresponding regularly. The two met again at the IJA convention in Akron, Ohio, and decided to pair up in 1988 for the Teams Championships in Denver, Colorado, where they took the silver medal only "two weeks after their first performance together." The following year, they took the gold.

Wee elected to move to southern California after he graduated from Luther College that spring. Morse graduated one year later from University of California, Irvine. By the end of 2006, Morse was living in Tustin with his wife and their two daughters while Wee lived in Hermosa Beach with his wife and their son and daughter.

== Career ==
Wee and Morse spent several years honing their act at comedy clubs, trade shows and colleges. They were the first jugglers documented to pass eleven clubs between them. In addition, their performances have been seen as innovative, having created such routines as "The Chainsaw Ballet" (performed to The Blue Danube) and "people juggling" (featuring three audience members hanging from special rigging). All in all the pair owns five Guinness World Records and has collected 18 gold medals from the IJA.

The Passing Zone was among the varied acts taking part in the Royal Variety Performance at Dominion Theatre in 1994 for England's Prince Charles, who called their act "very clever, although I'm glad I wasn't sitting in the front row!" Wee and Morse have performed during half-time shows at NBA, CBA and NCAA sporting events. They have been featured on such television programs as Comic Strip Live, The Tonight Show Starring Johnny Carson (in 1990 and 1991), Donny & Marie and Live with Regis and Kathie Lee. They were hired as juggling stand-ins for Raúl Juliá and Christopher Lloyd in The Addams Family (1991), performing "in the climactic Mamushka dagger-passing scene." In 2005, the pair took part in Penn Jillette's comedy documentary The Aristocrats, and appeared as juggling chefs in an episode of Hell's Kitchen.

Wee and Morse have been "guest performers" at the White House. They also were hired to provide guest commentary for ESPN's coverage of the World Juggling Federation competitions.

The men actively market their act to corporate events, where they demonstrate the concept of teamwork by bringing executives and employees to the stage and by using the company's products and logos as part of their act. They have performed to stress the value of teamwork for such diverse organizations as Boeing, Deloitte and Touche, Hewlett-Packard, Mattel and the United States Army.

=== America's Got Talent, 2006 ===
Wee (left) and Morse (right) prepare to throw sickles around David Hasselhoff (center) during the finals of America's Got Talent (season 1)

The Passing Zone made its first appearance during season 1 of America's Got Talent, as part of the Chicago auditions aired on July 5, 2006. Wee bounced a rubber (prop) bowling ball off of Morse's face ("to make sure you're paying attention"), then climbed onto Morse's shoulders while Morse balanced on a Rola Bola long enough for the duo to juggle a total of six flaming torches in unison. The judges' assessments were not unanimous; David Hasselhoff rejected them ("That's the act?!") while Brandy and Piers Morgan wanted to see more.

Wee and Morse replicated "people juggling" for the semi-finals on August 2, 2006, winning over the audience and Hasselhoff ("I think I have just gotten out of 'I Hate Jugglers Anonymous'. I thought that was fantastic!"). One of ten acts to return for the finals two weeks later, The Passing Zone brought Hasselhoff to the stage and, as all three men wore torches atop construction helmets (and with Hasselhoff holding four spinning plates), Wee and Morse passed sickles back and forth around him. Though Morgan thought they had done well, the act finished in the bottom five when the results of the viewers' vote were announced on August 17, 2006.

=== America's Got Talent, 2016 ===
The Passing Zone auditioned for season 11 of America's Got Talent in an episode broadcast on July 5, 2016. Wee and Morse asked judge Howie Mandel to lie on the stage; Morse straddled Mandel while juggling a mouse trap, a flaming plunger, and a taser. Wee then jumped over Morse while continuing to juggle the items. The act was put through to the Judges Cuts round, where their knife-throwing routine ended with Mandel in a dunk tank and earned them a trip to the live shows.

Wee and Morse returned to "people juggling" for their next performance, this time juggling judges Mandel, Heidi Klum, and Mel B. They were eliminated from the competition the following night. They returned to the competition as the judges' wild card act, set to appear during the show's second semi-final week. As promised, their act included judge Simon Cowell and "more risk of death" with numerous flaming torches. They were eliminated by popular vote.

== Filmography ==
Year	Film	Role	Other notes
1991	The Addams Family	Gomez and Fester Addams as jugglers	Stand-ins for Raúl Juliá and Christopher Lloyd
2005	The Aristocrats	themselves	
2005	Hell's Kitchen	themselves	1 episode Season 11, Episode 16
2019	Holey Moley	themselves	Appeared as The Distractor
2021	Game of Talents	themselves	Season 1, Episode 5
