= Headroll =

Headroll may refer to:

- Contact juggling#Headroll, in contact juggling, a trick involving rolling an object or prop, typically a ball, around on the juggler's head
- Headroll (dance), an intentional roll of the head around in a semi- or full circle at the end of a turn
