= Contact juggling =

Form of object manipulation

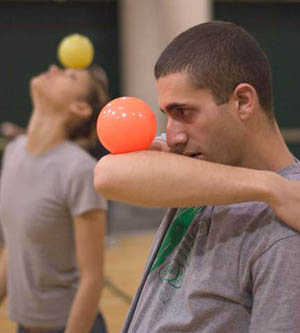
An example of body rolling

A man contact juggling

Contact manipulation is a form of object manipulation that focuses on the movement of objects such as balls in contact with the body. Although often used in conjunction with "toss juggling", it differs in that it involves the rolling of one or more objects without releasing them into the air.

== History ==
Many of the techniques found in contact manipulation, such as balancing or rolling a single ball or palm spinning (see "Baoding Balls"), have been performed for centuries. More variations were introduced by vaudevillians such as Paul Cinquevalli. In 1986, American juggler Tony Duncan was reported to be holding audiences spellbound with an act that involved rolling a single ball all over his body.

Michael Moschen brought the form to a new level with his performance, "Light", developed in the 1980s. In this performance he used 75mm clear crystal balls, palm spinning up to eight balls simultaneously. He finished the act by rolling a single clear ball so that it appeared to float over his hands and arms. Moschen received praise from the international circus community for his range of innovative techniques, and he was made a MacArthur Fellow (received a "Genius Award") in 1990. In the 1986 film Labyrinth, David Bowie's character performs contact manipulation throughout the film. These manipulations were performed by Moschen, who stood behind Bowie during filming, reaching around and performing the tricks "blind". In the film's credits, Moschen is credited for "crystal ball manipulation."

In the summer of 1990, John P. Miller (now better known by his pen-name, James Ernest), wrote and published the first edition of the book Contact Juggling, which covers all of the basic contact manipulation techniques and methods for learning them. The first edition had a run of only 100 copies, photocopied and stapled. The second edition was published in 1991, in a comb-bound format, by Ernest Graphics Press, with the author listed as James Ernest. Ernest is credited with coining the term "contact juggling".

In 1991, the video "Michael Moschen: In Motion" (created as the television special "In Motion with Michael Moschen" for PBS's "Great Performances" series) was released. Since then, this form of manipulation has received further popularization through instructional materials and performances developed by artist other than Moschen. Throughout the 1990s, there was continuing contention within the juggling community regarding whether Moschen's ideas were being stolen by performers and juggling instructors (see "Controversy", below). Many resources have since become available for contact jugglers, such as clubs, books, festivals, videos/DVDs, and balls specifically manufactured for contact manipulation.

In 2010, Zoom TV, a direct-marketing company, began mass-marketing "the Fushigi Magic Gravity Ball", an acrylic contact manipulation ball with a steel core (used to prevent the focusing of sunlight through a clear acrylic sphere, a fire hazard). Zoom TV claimed that the ball possesses special properties that make it "appear to float" and improve balance and control (see "Controversy", below), and saw significant commercial success.

In 2010, an updated and revised third edition of the book Contact Juggling was released by Ernest Graphics Press.

Michael Moschen, in interviews, has contested that so-called Contact Juggling does not exist, and that the term Contact Juggling is both self contradictory and erroneous, and created purely for commercial reasons.

== Types ==
=== Body rolling ===
Body rolling means manipulating one or more props (usually balls) around the hands, arms, and other parts of the body. Balance is required to hold the ball in various positions of control. This includes tricks such as headrolling and the butterfly, the trick of rolling the ball from the palm to the back of the hand via the fingertips.

=== Head rolling ===
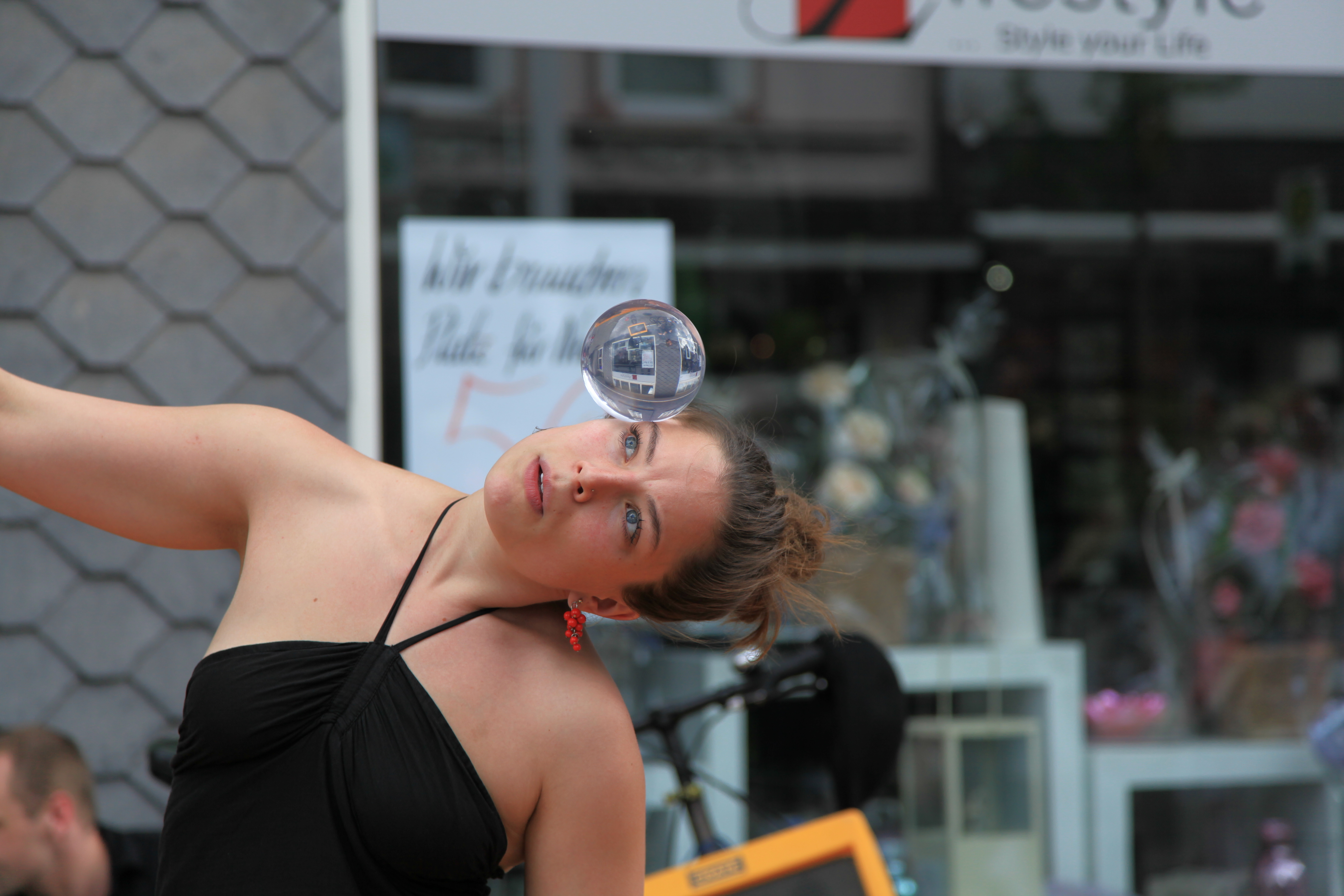
Head rolling

The headroll is a trick involving rolling an object or prop, typically a ball, around on the juggler's head. The most commonly performed version is rolling a ball from temple to temple, across the forehead. At some points during the trick, the object may be balanced in place at a certain location on the head. Points where the prop may be balanced (also known as placement, or trap) include: the temple, the center of the forehead, the back of the neck, the eye socket, the mouth, and the most difficult; the top of the head.

=== Palm spinning ===
Palm spinning means manipulating one or more balls in the open hand so that at least one ball is in motion. Balls may be in both hands or transferred between hands to form graceful and fluid patterns, including rotating a pyramid made of four or five balls in one hand.

=== Isolation moves ===
Isolation refers to the manipulation of a ball so that it appears to be suspended in place. Similar to sleight-of-hand techniques in magic or fixed-point mime techniques; the performers exploit the clear surface of the ball to hide any noticeable rotation, creating the effect that the ball is still while the performer moves around the ball.

== Equipment ==
There are various forms of contact balls such as:

- Clear acrylic balls
- Coloured acrylic balls
- LED contact balls
- Fire contact balls
- Silicone contact balls

== Controversy ==
Some jugglers have claimed that portions of the book Contact Juggling and any juggling performances that contain elements similar to Michael Moschen's original "Light" performance are breaches of Moschen's intellectual property or copyright. In 1992, Michael Moschen threatened not to attend the International Jugglers' Association annual conference in Quebec, Canada, where he was to be a guest of honor, due to Ted Alspach's favorable review of the book Contact Juggling in the Fall 1991 issue of the IJA's periodical, Juggler's World. In the end, Moschen did attend the festival.

The wide commercial success of the "Fushigi Magic Gravity Ball" in 2010 reignited the controversy within the contact juggling community. The television advertisement consisted of a montage of contact juggling performance, the amazed reactions of audience members, suggestions that the ball appeared to float by itself, and an announcer suggesting that the ball can be quickly mastered "in just minutes." Concerned about the public depiction of contact juggling being accomplished not by skill but by means of a special prop, contact jugglers quickly filled a Fushigi thread to 100 pages on contactjuggling.org. The Winter 2010 edition of the IJA's periodical Juggle features a 4-page article about "the Dynamic/Contact/Sphereplay/Fushigi Controversy" by Brad Weston, including an interview with the president of Zoom TV Products, the marketing firm that produced the Fushigi ball. The following issue featured a rebuttal by a professional contact juggler accusing Zoom TV Products of exploiting contact juggling to sell a deceptively marketed product. The Fushigi ball quickly fell out of production.

== In popular culture ==
In the 1986 movie Labyrinth, the Goblin King Jareth performed contact juggling moves of hand flips and cradle holding. David Bowie played the Goblin King Jareth, with Michael Moschen performing the contact juggling.

== See also ==
- Modern juggling culture
- Pen spinning
