= Orpheum Darmstadt =

Former theatre in Germany

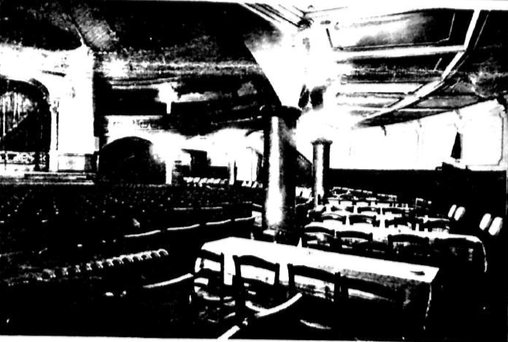
Seating and tables at Orpheum Darmstadt

Orpheum Darmstadt was a famous Varieté or Music hall in Darmstadt. It was destroyed in World War II and is remembered in the name of the arena Sportzentrum Orpheum that now stands on the site.

== History ==
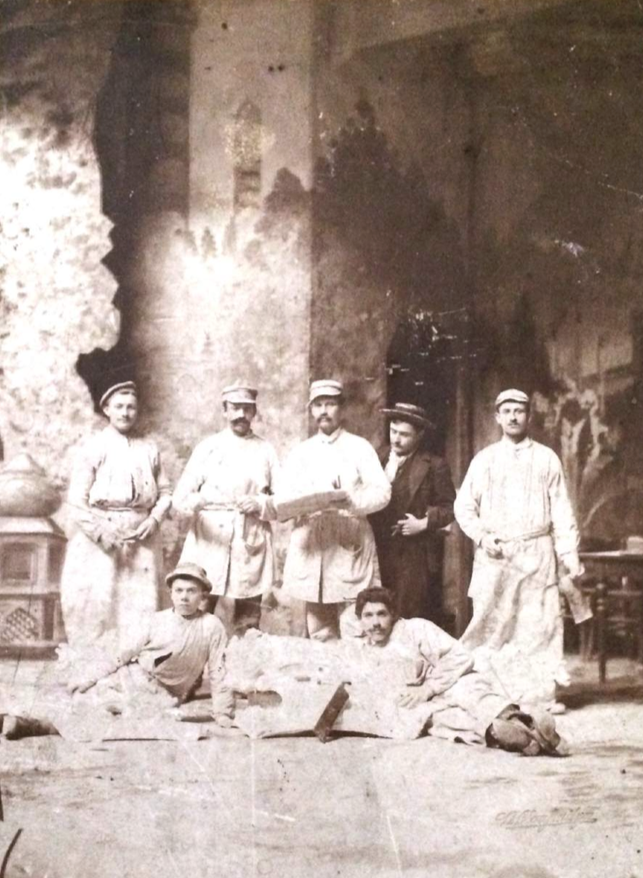
Construction workers at Orpheum Darmstadt

In 1877 Großherzog Ludwig IV built a skating ring for his wife Alice located in the northeast of Darmstadt, between the rail tracks and a road which today is called Spessartring. Friedrich Kranich, a traditional craftsman was commissioned to build the skating ring. In later years when skating was no longer in fashion the location was used as garrison administration. In 1895 the circular building was bought by the Fink family and turned into a 1200-seat theater named the Orpheum. The variete theater quickly became the most popular entertainment location in town for acrobatics and dramatic art (operetta and Bavarian folk plays). It was used for social performances. Numerous artists, many of them world-renowned performed at Orpheum Darmstadt. Amongst them the famous Comedian Harmonists and later Master Sextett, world famous jugglers such as Enrico Rastelli, who performed at Orpheum Darmstadt in 1928 and Franzl Brunn, U.S. Jazz-star Sam Wooding, as well as national stars: Heinz Rühmann, Charlie Rivel, the Clown Grock and pianist Elly Ney to name but a few. Author Joachim Ringelnatz mentioned the Orpheum in a passage of his book Die Flasche und mit ihr auf Reisen. During the later years famous actors of the theater and movies such as Willy Millowitsch came to perform.

The theater was peer to houses such as Berlin Wintergarten or Schumann Circus in Frankfurt (de). Besides numerous operas, drama and jazz there were several animal shows as well. Elephants doing maths, trained lions and dancing monkeys made the audience laugh and wonder. The Russian Imperial family as well as Grand Dukes were frequent visitors to the shows.

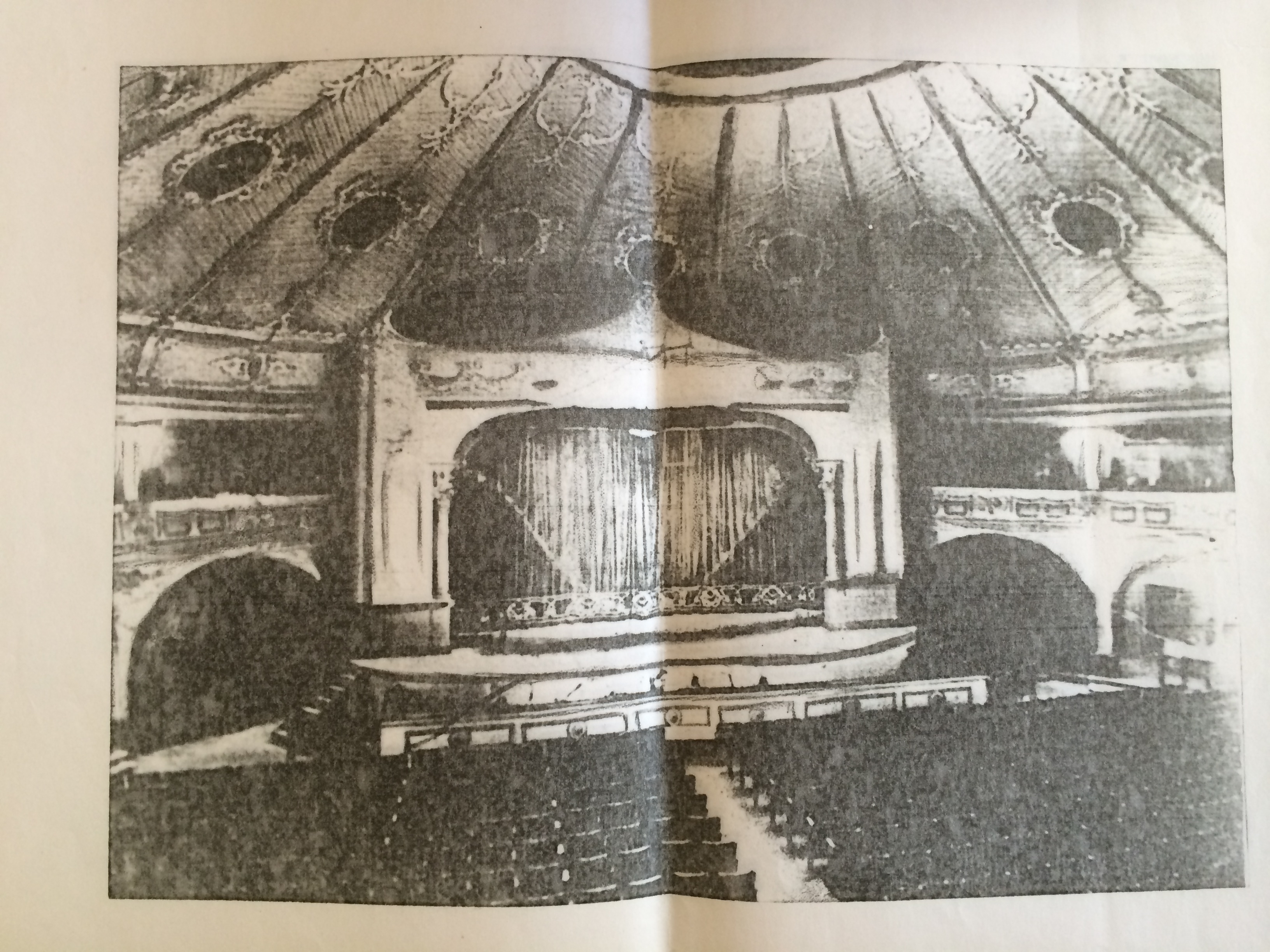
Stage of Theater Orpheum Darmstadt

During World War I And in times of high unemployment in the late 30s the leadership of Orpheum donated significant amounts to welfare work and offered free seats to the injured, invalids and unemployed. The financial situation in the following years was rather tight. On October 1, 1940, the NS organization “Kraft durch Freude” KdF (Strength through Joy) took over management of the theater and remodeled the building to turn it into a KdF location as known in other places. In the night of August 25/26 1944 the theater was destroyed completely during an air raid. Of the impressive structure with its artsy interior and gold columns only rubbles remained. In 1948 in direct vicinity to where the theater once stood a skating rink was built. In 1977 a sports hall bearing the name Sportzentrum Orpheum- the only remnant of the great theater that once stood there.
