= WJF =

WJF may refer to:

- World Juggling Federation
- General William J. Fox Airfield, (IATA airport code: WJF), a public airport in Lancaster, California
