= Thomas Dietz =

Thomas Dietz may refer to:

- Thomas Dietz (juggler), German juggler
- Thomas Dietz (politician), German politician

== See also ==
- Tom Deitz, American fantasy novelist, professor, and artist
