= Michael Moschen =

American juggler (born 1955)

Michael Moschen is an American juggler.

== Early life ==
Moschen was a classmate of Penn Jillette's at Greenfield High School in Greenfield, Massachusetts, class of 1973. The two worked together developing juggling performances immediately after high school.

== Career ==
In 1977, Moschen performed in the first season of the Big Apple Circus.

Moschen is particularly known for crystal ball manipulation. In the 1986 film Labyrinth, the crystal ball manipulations seen to be performed by David Bowie's character were actually done by Moschen, who stood behind Bowie during filming. Since Moschen could not see the objects he was juggling, it required many takes to film the scenes with the crystal balls.

He received a fellowship from the MacArthur Foundation (the Genius Grant) in 1990.

In 1991, an episode of Great Performances entitled "In Motion with Michael Moschen" focused on his creative process and showed several of his innovative juggling routines, featuring an original music score by David Van Tieghem. Moschen's television appearances also include An Evening at the Pops (with the Boston Pops Orchestra), Maury Povich, Penn & Teller's Sin City Spectacular, The Tonight Show, Jerry Lewis's MDA Telethon, The Montreal International Comedy Festival (Just for Laughs) on Showtime, Ricky Jay's Learned Pigs and Fireproof Women, Sesame Street, The David Letterman Show and PBS's Alive from Off-Center. Moschen is featured on the recent A&E documentary The Mystery of Genius and made his television dramatic acting debut on L.A. Law. He has also appeared on TV in England, Spain, Italy, Chile and Argentina. In 2001, Moschen was named one of Dance Magazine's "25 to Watch".

Moschen's 2002 talk for the TED Conference describes some of his thought processes.

Cirque du Soleil commissioned Moschen to create a new work for their permanent theatrical circus in Las Vegas, Nevada.

== See also ==
- List of jugglers
