= Renegade show =

Open stage event at juggling conventions

A renegade show at a juggling convention is "an open stage where anyone can, at short notice, get up and perform just about anything." At their best, they allow amateur jugglers to perform a couple of unique tricks for fellow jugglers without having to prepare a whole programme. Conventionally, a renegade show takes place in the earlier evenings of a juggling convention as a means for the jugglers to collaborate and share material that is unpolished or risqué. Acts in a renegade show, perhaps as a reaction to the commonly "g-rated" content of most juggling performances, frequently include drinking, heckling, and nudity, and are usually not open to the public (as opposed to the "gala show" at a juggling convention, an invitational and ticketed performance open to the public).

== Format ==
A Renegade Show usually occurs late in the evening and can continue for several hours (depending on the number of acts). Sign ups are impromptu, an Emcee is selected by organizers and a performance list is created. Jugglers look forward to the casual and sometime raucous nature of the anything goes nature of the show. Jugglers have performed with a live scorpion in their underwear, razor bladed yo-yos will pop balloons, nose flossing has been demonstrated, and mixed in, you just might see the most amazing juggling performances ever!

Drinking is often a component of a renegade show. At some conventions, each act is offered a drink in exchange for performing. Sometimes the Master of ceremonies takes a drink for each one consumed by the performers. Since many acts at a renegade show are of variable quality, sometimes the audience is encouraged to allow or deny a drink to a performer (determined by applause or heckling). Creative heckling is usually encouraged at a renegade show, sometimes resulting in performers getting booed off the stage. At larger conventions, the audience can come and go as they like, with a show concluding when the audience shrinks to a small enough size. Often a renegade show concludes when the alcohol supply runs out.

Designed to showcase the polished material of new performers and the unpolished material of experienced performers, a renegade show is an ideal venue to try out new work, new ideas, bad ideas, unfinished or half-thought-through ideas, just to improvise or to do 'satire' or make parodies of performances seen on the main stages at the convention. People come and sign-up to perform on an ad-hoc basis (or even just jump onto the stage when there's no one ready to perform). Sometimes the music is provided (randomly) by the sound technician; sometimes the performer has some music to work with; and sometimes performers perform acts that don't incorporate any kind of juggling at all (such as comedy, music, dance, burlesque, etc.).

Words of wisdom: Keep your show short and sweet; leave them wanting more. But hey, anything goes! They’ll let you know.

== History ==
The origins of the renegade show: a small group of jugglers at the 1986 San Jose, California International Jugglers' Association convention in the United States decided that they wanted a late night cabaret. This was not possible at the official IJA event, so they created an outdoor venue outside and next to the convention’s gymnasium, without IJA sanction, and put on a show with rented stage, lights and sound, on a little grass strip between buildings (had to run when the automatic sprinklers went on during one of the shows). The idea was motivated and created by the Renegade Juggling Company (based in Santa Cruz, California) hence the name 'Renegade Show'.

In the 1980s, the Renegade Juggling Company came to the 1989 Maastricht, Netherlands European Juggling Convention and put on a Renegade Show on a small floating stage in a competitive swimming pool venue with bleachers at the request of EJC coordinator, Lee Hayes (many performers went in the drink during that night’s merriment). It was a great success and since that year the Renegade Show has been an event at the EJC. To begin with it really was just a few jugglers (San Jose had around 100+ attending, and Maastricht more than that) and over the years the Renegade Show has become, more or less, an essential element of the EJC and also of many national and local juggling conventions. It's still a place to improvise, be creative, and debut new and experimental material.
