= Francis Brunn =

German juggler (1922–2004)

Francis Brunn (15 November 1922 in Aschaffenburg, Germany – 28 May 2004 in Frankfurt am Main, Germany) was a German juggler.

Brunn took up juggling in 1939, joining a traveling show that played all over Europe. He moved to America to join the Ringling Bros. and Barnum & Bailey Circus. He twice performed for President Dwight D. Eisenhower and gave a Command Performance for Queen Elizabeth in 1964. He performed in Judy Garland's show at the Palace Theatre in New York in 1967.

Though he is believed to have been the first performer to juggle 10 rings, he was best known for his seemingly simple, though very difficult routines, often involving a single ball, that required great control.

Brunn helped Philippe Petit financially for the 1974 walk on a tightrope between the Twin Towers of the New York City's World Trade Center.

Brunn retired in 1994.

== See also ==
- List of jugglers
- Lottie Brunn
