= Niels Duinker =

- Born: August 9, 1985 (age 39); Rotterdam, Netherlands
- Occupations: Juggler; comedian

Niels Duinker born 9 August 1985 in Rotterdam) is a professional comedy juggler from the Netherlands. Niels holds 3 Guinness World Records and got awarded "Variety Act of the Year" by the IMS. Niels started juggling at the age of 12 in Rotterdam. Between the age of 13 and 17 he has been a member of the youth circus "Circus Rotjeknor" in Rotterdam.

Since he graduated with a Bachelor of Science degree in Mechanical Engineering (Delft University of Technology) in 2009 he has toured intensively with his solo show. Highlights of his career include performing for the royal family of the Netherlands, the prince of Qatar and the vice-president of China. Niels performs with contact juggling, balls, rings, clubs, hats, and shaker cups.

He has won 3 gold medal at the Dutch Juggling Championships, holds seven Dutch juggling records, and holds three Guinness World Records for; Most diabolo spins around the arm in a minute, Most repetitions of the butterfly in three minutes (contact juggling), and Most shaker cup juggling catches in one minute (3 cups, 2 thrown).

He is also the European representative at the IJA.

== Awards ==
Niels has received the following awards and honours:

- “Variety Act of the Year” – International Magicians Society, 2012
- Guinness World Records record holder, 2011
- 2-times Guinness World Records record holder, 2012
- Guinness Book of World Records 2013
- World Juggling Federation Championships 2004, United States – Silver Medal
- National Juggling Championships 2005, The Netherlands – Gold Medal
- National Juggling Championships 2005, The Netherlands – Gold Medal (2x)
- International Jugglers’ Association 2006, Extreme Juggling – Gold Medal
- National Juggling Championships 2007, The Netherlands – Gold Medal
- National Juggling Championships 2009, The Netherlands – Silver Medal
- National Juggling Championships 2011, The Netherlands – Silver Medal
- Taiwan Circus Festival 2009 – Golden Award
- Taiwan Circus Festival 2009 – Award for the best Juggler
- Japan Juggling Championships 2009, 5 clubs – Silver Medal

== See also ==
- List of jugglers
