= Institute of Jugglology =

American performance art juggling team

The Institute of Jugglology is an American performance art juggling team from Fayetteville, Arkansas, consisting of Galen Harp and Ellen Winters.

== History ==
Harp and Winters started performing together in 2005 and specialize in theatrical routines, original tricks, and mixed object juggling. "Winters and Harp founded the Institute of Jugglology, a Fayetteville, Arkansas–based business that encompasses both performing and teaching. The duo is currently the top-ranked American juggling team, and they won the silver medal at this year’s International Jugglers’ Association Team Championships in Winston-Salem, North Carolina." Their work focuses on using object manipulation to create temporary works of art in the form of sand paintings and kinetic sculptures. In 2011 they began work on a four- part series of performances called “Circuit”.

"Circuits I-III" debuted at the International Juggling Championships with “Circuit II” placing second. The silver medalists, Galen Harp and Ellen Winters, performing as the Institute of Jugglology since 2005, explore the frontiers of technical eccentricity... Their mixed-object trade-offs and passing seemed to rate highly on the difficulty scale and the audience was always intrigued to see what would happen next. In 2014 their performance of “Circuit IV:Mandala” won the world championship awarded by the International Jugglers' Association. A blue juggling ball and a vial of sand from the performance are on display at the Museum of Juggling History.

== Works ==
Year	Title
2011	Circuit I:Escape
2012	Circuit II:Some Assembly Required
2012	Sepa/rend
2013	Circuit III:Paved with Good Intentions
2014	Prop Circles
2014	Circuit IV:Mandala
2015	Arcturus Then Straight on Till Morning
2016	Scream Nebula
2016	Needs
