= British Juggling Convention =

The British Juggling Convention (also known as The BJC) is an annual Juggling convention held in a different town or city in Britain every year. The event usually takes place in the Easter school holiday, usually lasting from the Wednesday to Sunday. The event is for all forms of juggling and object manipulation, plus many other circus skills. The BJC usually features many workshops, talks and shows during the day, renegade shows at night, and a public show on the Saturday.
