= Jason Garfield =

- Born: Jason Garfield; 9 August 1974 (age 51); Norfolk, Connecticut, USA
- Occupation: juggler
- Website: https://www.jasongarfield.com/

Jason Garfield (born August 9, 1974) is a juggler and entertainer from Norfolk, Connecticut, United States. He is the founder and president of the World Juggling Federation (WJF).

== Sport Juggling, TV & Event Production ==
Jason Garfield has been producing events since 2004, eleven of which in Las Vegas, and several across the country and one in the U.K. Jason learned to juggle at age 11 in 1986 and quickly established himself as one of the best and most controversial jugglers of his time.

Disappointed with the opportunities for competitive jugglers, Jason formed the World Juggling Federation in 2003 and produced his first sport juggling convention at the Riviera Hotel in December of 2004 where he also produced seven sport juggling competition programs for ESPN.

10 years later Jason founded SkillCon, hosting 20+ unique skill events. Jason, the World Juggling Federation, the Moxie Games, and SkillCon return to downtown Las Vegas in 2019 at the Plaza Hotel and Container Park.

== Appearance on Cheap Seats ==
Garfield was featured on ESPN Classic's show Cheap Seats where he was humorously depicted as a psychotic egomaniac who talked to the props he used while performing and proceeded to blame them for mistakes made during the act, a character he deliberately portrayed to add entertainment value to the program.

== Awards ==
Jason has received the following juggling awards:

- Juniors Championship Winner at the International Jugglers' Association (IJA) Summer Festival in 1988.
- Numbers Championship Winner (Individual Balls and Rings) at the IJA Summer Festival in 1990.
- Individuals Winner at the IJA Summer Festival in 1998.
- Numbers Competition Winner (Solo Balls, Clubs and Rings) at the IJA Summer Festival in 2000.
- Numbers Competition Winner (Solo Rings) at the IJA Summer Festival in 2001.
- Individuals Winner at the IJA Summer Festival in 2002.

== See also ==
- List of jugglers
