= Headroll (dance) =

In dance, a headroll is an intentional roll of the head around in a semi- or full circle at the end of a turn. Headrolls are often used to embellish simple turns and/or accentuate hits or cues in music. They are commonly practiced in many forms of street dances (e.g. salsa). In partner dancing, one can also lead a follow to perform a headroll during a turn.
