= Juggling convention =

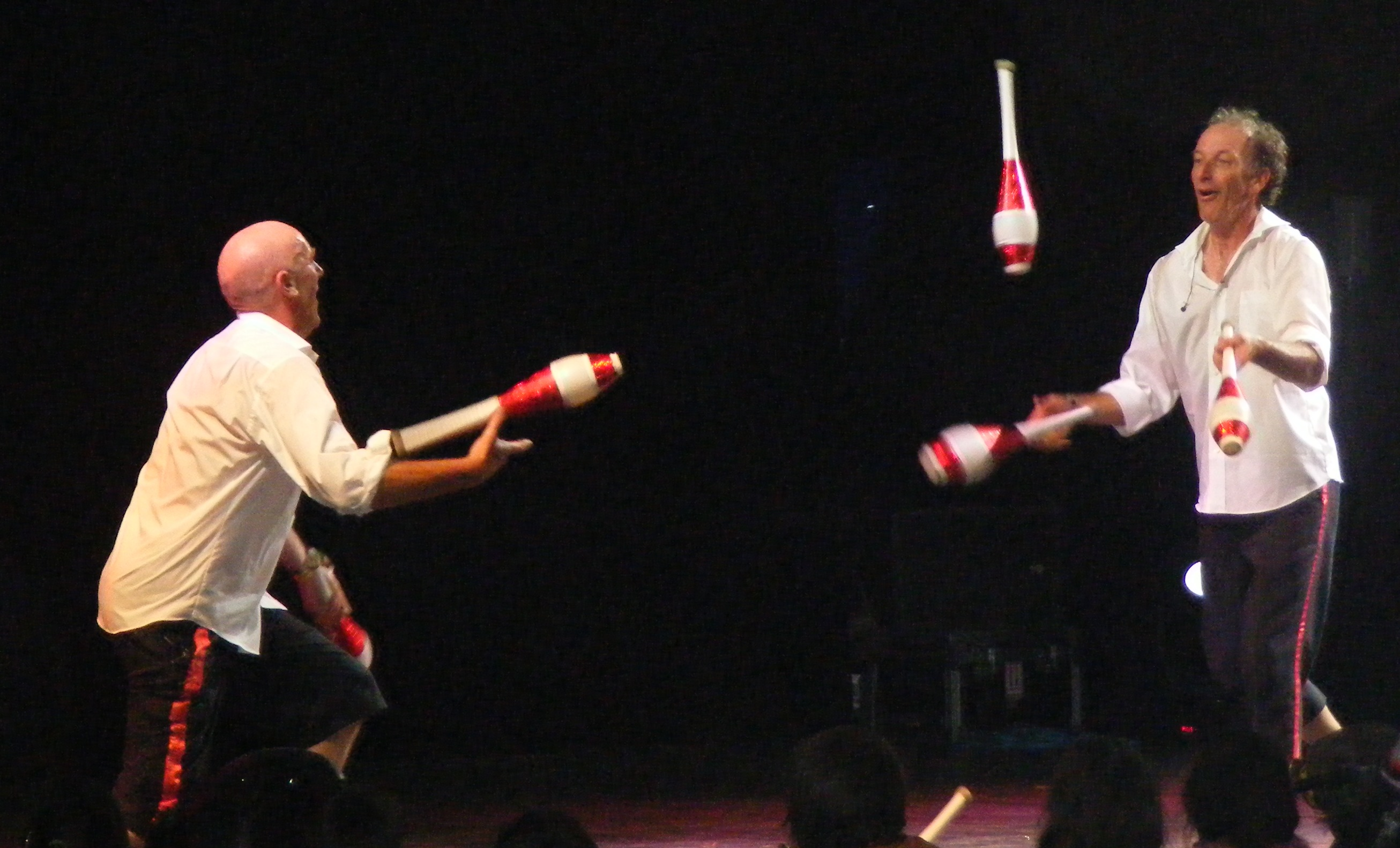
Haggis and Charlie at the 2009 Glastonbury Festival.

Many countries, cities or juggling clubs hold their own annual juggling convention or juggling festivals. These are the backbone of the juggling scene, the events that regularly bring jugglers from a wide area together to socialize. The attendance of a convention can be anything from a few dozen to a few thousand people.

== Typical activities ==
The principal focus of most juggling conventions is the main hall - where any participant can juggle freely, share and learn tricks, and try out multi-person passing patterns. Additionally, more formal "workshops" are often organized, in which expert jugglers work with small groups on specific skills and techniques. Most Juggling Conventions will also include a big show (open to the general public), competitions and juggling games. Many juggling conventions host some kind of Renegade Show, an open stage where anyone can, at short notice, get up and perform just about anything.

The Juggling Edge maintains a searchable database of past and upcoming juggling festivals and events.

== Types of juggling conventions ==
Conventions can be split into three distinct types, though all call themselves "Juggling Conventions":

=== "Festival" ===
These last three to ten days and can attract between 150 and 5,500 people. Most attendees camp, pitching tents within the convention site, and this is covered by the cost of attendance. Onsite there are usually food tents, bar tents, various sports halls or large bigtops for juggling space. During the day there can be shows, workshops, games, parades and exhibitions. Every night there is entertainment provided in the forms of professional shows, open stages, late night stages, live music, parties and more. The largest festival style conventions are held in Europe.

Some notable festival style conventions are:

- The European Juggling Convention - The world's largest convention is held in a different European country each year. The first EJC was held in 1978 in Brighton, England and attracted 11 jugglers from five countries (England, Ireland, Scotland, Germany, The US). The convention lasts 7 to 9 days. In 2011 it was held in Munich, Germany and attracted over 7200 jugglers from all over the world, making it the biggest EJC since the start of this convention. The 2026 festival will take place in Ptuj, Slovenia.
- The British Juggling Convention - a 5-7 day juggling convention in the UK, now attracts between 750 and 1,000 each year, held in the Easter school holiday.
- The French Juggling Convention (CFJ) is in a different city each year organised by one of the associations that organises a local juggling convention, supported by the Association Française de Jonglerie (AFJ), and runs for about a week.
- Israeli Juggling Convention - runs for 5 days over the Passover holiday and is held at Gan HaShlosha National Park in the north of Israel. It attracts between 1200 and 1400 members of the public including many jugglers.
- Berlin Juggling Convention - Germany's largest juggling convention, about 600-800 people attended each year.
- Circulation - A 3-5 day juggling festival in New Zealand currently in its fifth year of operation attended by up to 300 people.
- The Dutch Juggling Convention - a 4-day convention run each year in a different city in the Netherlands over the ascension day holiday and is attended by about 500 jugglers.
- Broxford (formerly The Bristol Juggling and Circus Skills Convention) - a 9-day convention held in southern England. Attended by about 300 people each year.
- The Bungay Balls Up - a 10-day convention held in Suffolk, UK.
- The Turkish Juggling Convention - A convention of 7 days held in Sundance-Antalya and attended by more than 300 people.
- The Swedish Juggling Convention - A four-day convention held over the Easter holiday.
- Brianza Juggling Convention - Imbersago (MI), Italy - a four-day convention held over the long weekend in May each year attended by about 1000 people.
- Dali Flow Fest - Dali City, Yunnan, China - a seven-day convention held on first week of third moon of Chinese calendar and attended by about 150 people.

=== "Conference" ===
These are held in city center hotels or conference centers. They are invariably in North America and slightly more expensive than the European Juggling Convention. Camping is only rarely an option, as most are held in hotel convention centers. Notable conference-style conventions are :

- The IJA Summer Festival - The first and longest running juggling convention. It is held in a different city each year, with the largest attendance in the 1990s of up to 1,300 jugglers. In 2014 it was held in West Lafayette, Indiana, and attracted over 500 jugglers.
- The Japan Juggling Festival (JJF) is an annual event held in a different city each year since 1999. Hosted by the Japan Juggling Association. activities at this festival include workshops, shows, and competitions.
- The World Juggling Federation Convention - the first WJF convention was held in Las Vegas in December 2004 and attracted 150-200 jugglers. More recent WJF conventions have been televised for ESPN.

=== "One Day" ===
Small, regional conventions that last up to two or three days. These usually attract between 25 and 250 people, have workshops throughout the day and a show in the evening of the main day. At these conventions accommodation and food is not normally provided. They are usually held in sports centres, schools or universities. Some notable one day conventions are:

- Chocfest - in York, UK
- Leeds Juggling Festival - Leeds, UK
- Camvention - Cambridge, UK

== The four largest conventions ==
The most well attended convention is the European Juggling Convention (EJC), along with the British Juggling Convention (BJC), the Israeli Juggling Convention (IJC), and the IJA Festival (IJA). They all take place annually.

The BJC occurs every spring, the IJC is staged over Passover, and the EJC and IJA are summer festivals. The BJC takes place in Britain, the IJC in Israel, and the EJC in Europe, as one might expect, but the IJA Festival has so far proven to be an exclusively North American event, despite it being the principal date in the calendar of the International Jugglers' Association.

=== Dates and locations of the four largest festivals ===
Year	British Juggling Convention	European Juggling Convention	IJA Festival	Israeli Juggling Convention
2029		EJC 51: Lublin, Poland		
2028		EJC 50: Espinho, Portugal		
2027	BJC 36: Forest Row, East Sussex	EJC 49: Azores, Portugal	IJA 80: Cedar Rapids, Iowa	
2026	BJC 35: Preston	EJC 48: Ptuj, Slovenia	IJA 79: Fort Wayne, Indiana	
2025	~~BJC 35: Thurrock~~ Cancelled	EJC 47: Papendal, Netherlands	IJA 78: Evansville, Indiana	
2024	BJC 34: Lytham St Annes	EJC 46: Ovar, Portugal	IJA 77: Green Bay, Wisconsin	
2023	BJC 33: Ramsgate	EJC 45: Lublin, Poland	IJA 76: South Bend, Indiana	
2022	BJC 32: Ramsgate	EJC 44: Tres Cantos, Madrid, Spain	IJA 75: Cedar Rapids, Iowa	
2021	~~BJC 32: Perth~~ Cancelled	~~EJC 43: Hanko, Finland~~ Cancelled/Online	IJA 74: Wichita, Kansas (online)	
2020			~~IJA 73: El Paso, Texas~~ Cancelled	
2019		EJC 42: Newark, United Kingdom	IJA 72: Fort Wayne, Indiana	
2018	BJC 31: Canterbury	EJC 41: São Miguel, Azores	IJA 71: Springfield, Massachusetts	
2017	BJC 30: Nottingham	EJC 40: Lublin, Poland	IJA 70: Cedar Rapids, Iowa	
2016	BJC 29: Perth	EJC 39: Almere, Netherlands	IJA 69: El Paso, Texas	
2015	BJC 28: Darton	EJC 38: Bruneck, Italy	IJA 68: Quebec City, Canada	IJC 22: Gan HaShlosha National Park (Sachne)
2014	BJC 27: Darton	EJC 37: Millstreet, Ireland	IJA 67: West Lafayette, Indiana	IJC 21: Gan HaShlosha National Park (Sachne)
2013	BJC 26: Pickering	EJC 36: Toulouse, France	IJA 66: Bowling Green, Ohio	IJC 20: Gan HaShlosha National Park (Sachne)
2012	BJC 25: Southend	EJC 35: Lublin, Poland	IJA 65: Winston-Salem, North Carolina	IJC 19: Gan HaShlosha National Park (Sachne)
2011	BJC 24: Nottingham	EJC 34: Munich, Germany	IJA 64: Rochester, Minnesota	IJC 18: Gan HaShlosha National Park (Sachne)
2010	BJC 23: Huddersfield	EJC 33: Joensuu, Finland	IJA 63: Sparks, Nevada	IJC 17: Gan HaShlosha National Park (Sachne)
2009	BJC 22: Norwich	EJC 32: Vitoria/Gasteiz, Basque country, Spain	IJA 62: Winston-Salem, North Carolina	IJC 16: Gan HaShlosha National Park (Sachne)
2008	BJC 21: Doncaster	EJC 31: Karlsruhe, Germany	IJA 61: Lexington, Kentucky	IJC 15: Gan HaShlosha National Park (Sachne)
2007	BJC 20: Nottingham	EJC 30: Athens, Greece	IJA 60: Winston-Salem, North Carolina	IJC 14: Gan HaShlosha National Park (Sachne)
2006	BJC 19: Bodmin	EJC 29: Millstreet, Ireland	IJA 59: Portland, Oregon	IJC 13: Gan HaShlosha National Park (Sachne)
2005	BJC 18: Perth	EJC 28: Ptuj, Slovenia	IJA 58: Davenport, Iowa	IJC 12: Gan HaShlosha National Park (Sachne)
2004	BJC 17: Derby	EJC 27: Carvin, France	IJA 57: Buffalo, New York	IJC 11: Gan HaShlosha National Park (Sachne)
2003	BJC 16: Brighton	EJC 26: Svendborg, Denmark	IJA 56: Reno, Nevada	IJC 10: Gan HaShlosha National Park (Sachne)
2002	BJC 15: Whitstable	EJC 25: Bremen, Germany	IJA 55: Reading, Pennsylvania	IJC 9: Gan HaShlosha National Park (Sachne)
2001	BJC 14: Cardiff	EJC 24: Schiedam/Rotterdam, Netherlands	IJA 54: Madison, Wisconsin	IJC 8: Gan HaShlosha National Park (Sachne)
2000	BJC 13: York	EJC 23: Karlsruhe, Germany	IJA 53: Montreal, Canada	IJC 7: (Sachne)
1999	BJC 12: Durham	EJC 22: Grenoble, France	IJA 52: Niagara Falls, New York	IJC 6: Yafit, Jordan Valley
1998	BJC 11: Bristol	EJC 21: Edinburgh, UK	IJA 51: Primm, Nevada	IJC 5: Kibbutz Tuval
1997	BJC 10: Nottingham	EJC 20: Turin, Italy	IJA 50: Pittsburgh, Pennsylvania	IJC 4: Hebrew University, Givat Ram, Jerusalem
1996	BJC 9: Edinburgh	EJC 19: Grenoble, France	IJA 49: Rapid City, South Dakota	IJC 3: Hineni Center, Downtown Jerusalem
1995	BJC 8: Norwich	EJC 18: Goteburg, Sweden	IJA 48: Las Vegas, Nevada	
1994	BJC 7: Manchester	EJC 17: Hagen, Germany	IJA 47: Burlington, Vermont	
1993	BJC 6: Birmingham	EJC 16: Leeds, UK	IJA 46: Fargo, North Dakota	
1992	BJC 5: Coventry	EJC 15: Banyoles, Spain	IJA 45: Montreal, Canada	
1991	BJC 4: Leeds	EJC 14: Verona, Italy	IJA 44: St Louis, Missouri	
1990	BJC 3: Exeter	EJC 13: Oldenburg, Germany	IJA 43: Los Angeles, California	IJC --: Eilat
1989	BJC 2: Bath	EJC 12: Maastricht, Netherlands	IJA 42: Baltimore, Maryland	IJC 2: Eilat
1988	BJC 1: London	EJC 11: Bradford, UK	IJA 41: Denver, Colorado	IJC 1: Eilat
1987		EJC 10: Saintes, France	IJA 40: Akron, Ohio	
1986		EJC 9: Castellar, Spain	IJA 39: San Jose, California	
1985		EJC 8: Louvain la Neuve, Belgium	IJA 38: Atlanta, Georgia	
1984		EJC 7: Frankfurt, Germany	IJA 37: Las Vegas, Nevada	
1983		EJC 6: Laval, France	IJA 36: Purchase, New York	
1982		EJC 5: Copenhagen, Denmark	IJA 35: Santa Barbara, California	
1981		EJC 4: London, UK	IJA 34: Cleveland, Ohio	
1980		EJC 3: London, UK	IJA 33: Fargo, North Dakota	
1979		EJC 2: Newport-on-Tay, UK	IJA 32: Amherst, Massachusetts	
1978		EJC 1: Brighton, UK	IJA 31: Eugene, Oregon	
1977			IJA 30: Newark, Delaware	
1976			IJA 29: Los Angeles, California	
1975			IJA 28: Youngstown, Ohio	
1974			IJA 27: Sarasota, Florida	
1973			IJA 26: Livingston, New Jersey	
1972			IJA 25: Rocky Hill, Connecticut	
1971			IJA 24: Rocky Hill, Connecticut	
1970			IJA 23: Los Angeles, California	
1969			IJA 22: Los Angeles, California	
1968			IJA 21: San Mateo, California	
1967			IJA 20: Fallsburg, New York	
1966			IJA 19: Salem, Massachusetts	
1965			IJA 18: Bronx, New York	
1964			IJA 17: Wheeling, Virginia	
1963			IJA 16: Wickford, Rhode Island	
1962			IJA 15: Erie, Pennsylvania	
1961			IJA 14: Bristol, Tennessee	
1960			IJA 13: Madison, Wisconsin	
1959			IJA 12: Wickford, Rhode Island	
1958			IJA 11: Ashtabula, Ohio	
1957			IJA 10: Chautauqua, New York	
1956			IJA 9: Norwalk, Ohio	
1955			IJA 8: Lancaster, Pennsylvania	
1954			IJA 7: Elkhart, Indiana	
1953			IJA 6: Erie, Pennsylvania	
1952			IJA 5: Altoona, Pennsylvania	
1951			IJA 4: Williamsport, New York	
1950			IJA 3: Jamestown, New York	
1949			IJA 2: Jamestown, New York	
1948			IJA 1: Pittsburgh, Pennsylvania	

(Note: This list was compiled from data provided by Mike Armstrong at UK_Jugglers)
