= Thomas Dietz (juggler) =

German juggler

Thomas Dietz (born May 19, 1982) is a professional juggler from Regensburg, Germany. He is recognized as one of the greatest technical jugglers in the world. He holds various unofficial juggling records and also the five club juggling world record of 53 minutes and 21 seconds. (Note: While the JISCON list is long outdated, Dietz's record specifically still stands.) However, he gained most of his popularity through several juggling videos featuring his highly technical tricks including siteswap variations, pirouettes, and long runs of numbers with clubs, balls, and sometimes rings.

== Titles ==
=== 2004 ===
International Jugglers' Association 57th Summer Festival

- Individual Stage Competition - Gold
- Solo Numbers Ball Competition - 1st - 8 balls, 23 catches
- Solo Numbers Club Competition - 3rd - 6 clubs, 25 catches
- Solo Numbers Ring Competition - 3rd - 8 rings, 17 catches

World Juggling Federation WJF1

- Advanced Balls Competition - 2nd - score of 9.04
- Advanced Clubs Competition - 3rd - score of 8.14
- Advanced Rings Competition - 2nd - score of 8.86
- Endurance Balls Competition - 1st - 9 balls, 25 catches
- Endurance Rings Competition - 2nd - 8 Rings, 19 Catches

=== 2005 ===
World Juggling Federation WJF2

- Advanced Balls Competition - 1st - score of 12.5
- Advanced Clubs Competition - 2nd - score of 11.1
- Advanced Rings Competition - 1st - score of 8.0
- Endurance Balls Competition - 1st - 9 balls, 18 catches
- Endurance Clubs Competition - 3rd - 6 clubs, 132 catches
- Endurance Rings Competition - 1st - 8 rings, 16 catches

=== 2006 ===
World Juggling Federation WJF3

- Overall Competition - 1st - score of 35.00
- Advanced Balls Competition - 1st - score of 9.33
- Advanced Rings Competition - 2nd - score of 8.71
- Advanced Clubs Competition - 1st - score of 8.71
- Endurance Balls Competition - 1st - 9 balls, 27 catches
- Endurance Rings Competition - 2nd - 8 Rings, 15 Catches
- Endurance Clubs Competition - 2nd - 7 Clubs, 28 Catches

=== 2007 ===
World Juggling Federation WJF4

- Overall Championship - 1st - score of 39.65
- Advanced Balls Competition - 1st - score of 9.6
- Advanced Rings Competition - 1st - score of 9.4
- Advanced Clubs Competition - 2nd - score of 7.9
- 5 Ball Freestyle - 2nd
- 6 Ball Freestyle - 1st, with a B97531 into a 4 up multiplex into a high low shower
- 7 Ball Freestyle - 1st, with DB97531
- 5 Rings Freestyle - 2nd, with a 6x4 5 up 720
- 6 Rings Freestyle - 1st, with a 6 up synch 360 into a 6 up synch 360
- 7 Rings Freestyle - 1st, with a 5 up 360
- 3 Clubs Freestyle - 4th
- 4 Clubs Freestyle - 4th
- 5 Clubs Freestyle - 3rd, with a 3 up 720 into one sided flat throws
- 3 Clubs 360s - 2nd, with 34
- 5 Clubs 360s - 2nd, with 11
- 5 Balls 360s - 1st, with 27
- 5 Rings 360s - 1st, with 19
- 7 Balls Isolated Endurance - 1st
- 7 Rings Isolated Endurance - 1st

=== 2008 ===
World Juggling Federation WJF5

- Overall Championship - 1st
- Advanced Balls Competition - 1st - score of 15.5
- Advanced Rings Competition - 2nd - score of 9.4
- Advanced Clubs Competition - 2nd - score of 7.8
- 6 Ball Freestyle - 1st, with a high low 4 up 720
- 7 Ball Freestyle - 4th
- 5 Rings Freestyle - 1st, with an over and back with 4 up each way
- 6 Rings Freestyle - 1st, with a (8,8)(4,4)>6 up 360>4 up 360> qualify
- 7 Rings Freestyle - 1st, with a 5 up 360 into (8x, 6)
- 5 Clubs Freestyle - 1st, with a 3 up 720 into one sided flats
- 6 Clubs Freestyle - 3rd, with a 9555 into 75
- Battle for the World Juggling Federation (WJF) presidency -1st 10.9

== Videos ==
Mark Probst, a friend of Thomas, released several videos of Thomas and others (including himself and Vova Galchenko) juggling by posting them to the newsgroup rec.juggling under his nickname "Schani".

- Thomas Dietz Video #1 (released Sept. 19, 2003)
  - Devil in Disguise by Elvis Presley
  - Trepak from Tchaikovsky's The Nutcracker (exact artist of the version in the video is unknown)
- Thomas Dietz Video #2 (released Oct. 8, 2003)
  - I've Got Two Legs by Monty Python
  - Axel F by Nile Rodgers
  - Smooth Criminal by Alien Ant Farm
- Thomas Dietz Video #3 (released Nov. 24, 2003)
  - Wannabe by Spice Girls
  - Self Esteem by The Offspring
  - All Shook Up by Elvis Presley
- Thomas Dietz Video #4 (released December, 2003)
  - BND by No Doubt
  - The Twist by Chubby Checker
- Juggling in Berlin (released Dec. 20, 2003)
  - One Vision by Queen
- Thomas Dietz Video #5 (released Dec. 22, 2003)
  - Basket Case performed by Avril Lavigne (cover of Green Day)
  - Also Sprach Zarathustra by Richard Strauss (theme from 2001: A Space Odyssey)
- Thomas Dietz Video #6 (released Dec. 23, 2003)
  - Theme from Star Wars by John Williams
  - Red River Rock by Johnny and the Hurricanes
  - Let Me Entertain You by Robbie Williams
- The Markus Furtner and Thomas Dietz Show (released Dec. 29, 2003)
  - HIStory by Michael Jackson
- The Thomas Dietz Video Nobody Wants to See (released Dec. 30, 2003)
  - (Let Me Be Your) Teddy Bear by Elvis Presley
  - Black & White by Sarah McLachlan
- Thomas Dietz Video #7 (released Feb. 11, 2004)
- Thomas Dietz Video #8 (released Feb. 16, 2004)
  - Sk8er Boi by Avril Lavigne
- Thomas Dietz Video #9 (released Feb. 20, 2004)
  - Basket Case by Green Day
  - Yakety Yak by The Coasters
- Competition Video (released March, 2004)
  - Spokesman by Goldfinger
- Thomas Dietz's Worst Tricks (released Sept. 7, 2004)
  - Bohemian Polka by "Weird Al" Yankovic
  - All The Small Things by blink-182
  - My Happy Ending by Avril Lavigne
- Juggling in Israel (released Nov. 25, 2004)
  - Taluy al Hazlav (Hung on the Cross) by Rami Fortis (song is in Hebrew)
- Another Thomas Dietz Video Nobody Wants to See (Nov. 26, 2004)
  - Popcorn by Hot Butter
  - Walk Like an Egyptian by The Bangles
- Still Juggling in Berlin (released Nov. 28, 2004)
  - Eye of the Tiger by Survivor
- Still Not Thomas Dietz Video #10 (released Dec. 17, 2004)
  - Think by Aretha Franklin
  - Burning Love by Elvis Presley
- Thomas Dietz Video #10 (released Dec. 20, 2004)
  - (theme from Star Trek)
  - Anthem Part 2 by Blink-182
  - Smooth Criminal by Alien Ant Farm
- Manuel Mitasch and Thomas Dietz (released Jan. 11, 2005)
  - Don't Pick it Up by The Offspring
  - All I Want by The Offspring
- Juggling in Linz (released May 2, 2005)
  - Diamond by Klint from the Snatch motion picture soundtrack.
  - Beware Of Us by Xzibit (feat. Strong Arm Steady)

=== Produced by Thomas ===
In December 2006, Thomas began releasing short videos on YouTube.

- Clip 1 (released Dec. 19, 2006)
  - Spring from The Four Seasons by Antonio Vivaldi
  - Infernal Galop from Act II, Scene 2 in Orpheus in the Underworld by Jacques Offenbach
- Clip 2 (released Dec. 25, 2006)
  - Humppasonni by Eläkeläiset
- Thomas Dietz Video #11 Trailer (released Dec. 26, 2006)
  - Anthem Part 2 by Blink-182

== See also ==
- List of jugglers
