= Lottie Brunn =

German-American juggler (1925–2008)

Lottie Brunn (October 12, 1925 - August 5, 2008) was a German American acrobat. She is believed to be the fastest woman juggler.

She started juggling as a teenager in Aschaffenburg, Germany, together with her brother, Francis Brunn. She and her brother were brought to the United States after being discovered in Spain by John Ringling North in 1947. She became a United States citizen in 1962.

She was the wife of circus ringmaster Ted Chirrick. Her son Michael Chirrick was also a juggler.

Brunn was a resident of Moonachie, New Jersey. She had moved to the area in 1959 when she came to the area for an appearance on The Ed Sullivan Show and perform at Radio City Music Hall and found other circus artists living there.
