= Enrico Rastelli =

Italian juggler, acrobat and performer (1896–1931)

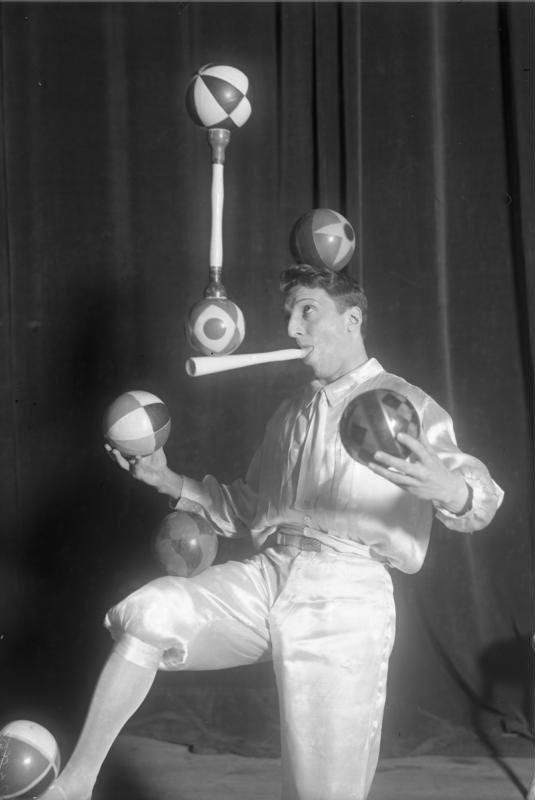
- Rastelli in 1930
- Born: 19 December 1896; Samara, Russia
- Died: 13 December 1931 (aged 34); Bergamo, Italy
- Resting place: Cimitero Monumentale, Bergamo
- Occupations: Juggler; acrobat; performer
- Spouse: Harriet Price (m. 1917)
- Children: 3

Enrico Rastelli (19 December 1896 – 13 December 1931) was an Italian juggler, acrobat and performer.

== Biography ==
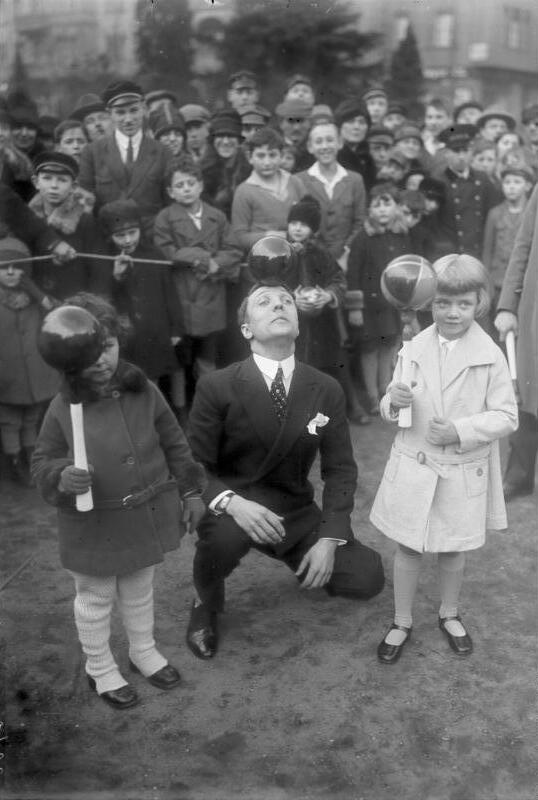
Rastelli in 1930

Rastelli was born on 19 December 1896, in Samara, Russia, into a circus family. Both of his parents were performers and it did not take long before the young Rastelli decided to join the family business. He received rigorous training in a variety of circus disciplines including acrobatics, balancing and aerial skills. His performance debut was at the age of 13 as part of his parents' aerial act, however his passion and talent lay with juggling. He practiced his juggling skills tirelessly and by the age of 19 was performing a solo juggling routine. His earliest performances involved the manipulation of sticks and balls in a typical Japanese style; he even wore a Kimono as his costume.

Many jugglers of Rastelli's day were of the gentleman juggler style. Dressed in formal evening attire, they would juggle everyday objects that you might find at the dinner table, including plates, hat and cane, loaves of bread, bottles and even chairs. Rastelli instead chose to restrict himself to objects more suited to throwing and catching, typically plates, sticks and balls. In doing so, he was able to achieve levels of technical skill far beyond that of his contemporaries. Furthermore, his choice of three simple props is reflected in the props of choice of most modern jugglers, with balls, clubs (replacing sticks) and rings (replacing plates) being used by professional and amateur jugglers alike.

In 1917, Rastelli married Harriet, a highwire artist. By the early 1920s he was becoming quite a star, touring Europe and America, amazing audiences and commanding an ever-increasing salary. In this period he chose to perform in a silk costume adding static balance tricks to his energetic performances. During the later part of the 1920s he made the move from the circus ring to the more lucrative vaudeville theatres. His style changed again, performing in full soccer strip he would juggle up to five footballs. With his growing fortune, Rastelli, his wife and their three children purchased a large villa in Bergamo.

While touring Europe in 1931 Rastelli's gums suddenly started bleeding and shortly afterwards he contracted pneumonia. He quickly returned home, however his condition worsened and he died in the early hours of the morning, 13 December 1931, as a result of anemia.

His funeral took place in Bergamo, attended by thousands. A life-sized statue to Rastelli was erected within his tomb, depicting him in a familiar pose, spinning a ball on his raised finger. Vanity Fair magazine, in its February 1932 issue, (page 49), ran a full-page photograph of Rastelli with the following caption:

One of the most sensational attractions in the international world of vaudeville was the juggler Enrico Rastelli. In his twenty years devotion to his craft this son of Italy elevated it, for probably the first time, to what was unmistakably an art. The accomplishment of this was due not only to the amazing agility and complexity of the juggling itself, (he used mostly spheroids, of various sizes and colors) but to the incredible ease of his execution, and the visual impression made on the audience. Rastelli, who was the third generation and the most famous of the jugglers by that name, died in Bergamo, Italy, shortly before this photograph went to press.

Rastelli's contribution to juggling is of great significance. His skill in being able to juggle multiple objects, sometimes while balancing objects on his head or body and his world record number juggling remained unparalleled until recently. He was also a master of 'combination' style tricks, being able to juggle 6 plates, while spinning a hoop around one foot and skipping a rope which was spun by an assistant. His influence is still felt today, with most jugglers restricting themselves to the use of clubs, rings and balls.

== See also ==
- List of jugglers

== Sources ==
- Ziethen, Karl-Heinz; Allen, Andrew (1985). Juggling, the Art and its Artists. ISBN 3-9801140-1-5.
- Ziethen, Karl-Heinz (1996). Enrico Rastelli, The World's Greatest Jugglers.
- Alvarez, Francisco (1984). Juggling - Its History and Greatest Performers.
