= Paul Cinquevalli =

German juggler (1859–1918)

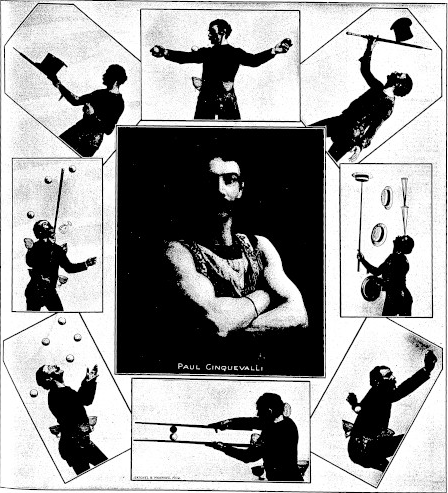
Paul Cinquevalli, in the New York Clipper, 1907

Paul Cinquevalli (30 June 1859 – 14 July 1918) was a German music hall entertainer whose speciality juggling act made him popular in the English music halls during the 19th and early 20th century.

Cinquevalli first appeared in England in 1885 with much success and settled in London, appearing in various circuses, music halls and pantomimes. In 1912, he became one of the first acts to appear in music hall's first Royal Command Performance. He is perhaps best known for being one of the first "gentleman jugglers", a description given to a male performer who juggles with everyday objects such as bottles, plates, glasses and umbrellas.

== Biography ==
Cinquevalli was born either Paul Kestner or Emil Otto Paul Braun in Lissa in the Prussian Province of Posen (now Poland). His parents moved to Berlin when he was two years old. His began his career in the circus when he was 12 having been spotted in a school gymnastics display.

Cinquevalli publicized himself widely, leading to differing accounts on what of his life is fact and what is fiction. At the age of 12, he ran away from home to join an acrobatic troupe led by an Italian, Giuseppe Chiese-Cinquevalli. Initially he performed on high wire and trapeze, but he took up juggling while recovering from a fall. He first appeared in England in 1885 and was a success. He settled in London and appeared in various circuses, music halls and pantomimes. In 1912, he became one of the first acts to appear in the music hall's first ever Royal Command Performance.

Though he performed in a stylized costume consisting of a leotard and tights, he is generally regarded as one of the first gentleman jugglers, because he performed with everyday objects such as bottles, plates, glasses and umbrellas. One of the tricks he originated which is still performed today, was to throw a full bottle in the air, catch the neck of the bottle on the spike of an umbrella, and then open the umbrella as the liquid in the bottle ran out of it. He also incorporated feats of strength in his act. One of his trademark tricks was supporting a chair in his teeth while juggling three balls. On the chair sat an assistant reading a newspaper, and on the assistant's lap was a desk.

At the beginning of his career, Cinquevalli would use the local stage hand as his assistant in his juggling act. From 1899 until 1909 he had much success using the very comically gifted Walter Burford as a continuous assistant. Walter first joined the act in Melbourne, Australia in April 1899 at the Bijou.

When the First World War commenced in 1914, Cinquevalli was ostracised due to his German nationality and did not appear in England after 1912. He retired from the stage and died in Brixton, London in 1918. He was buried at West Norwood Cemetery.

== Literary references ==
Cinquevalli's life and career is the subject of a poem by Edwin Morgan, the National Poet of Scotland from 2004 to 2010.

== See also ==
- List of jugglers
