= European Juggling Convention =

Annual juggling event held in Europe

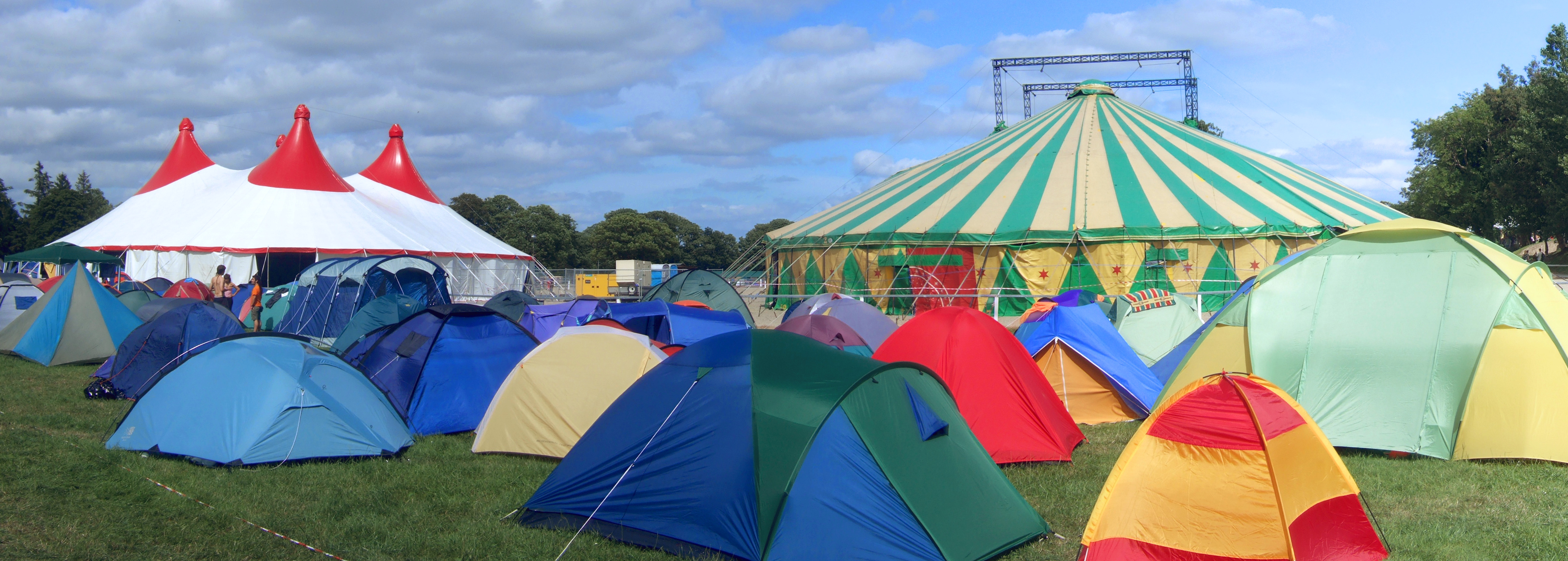
EJC 2006, Millstreet, Ireland.

The European Juggling Convention (EJC), is the largest juggling convention in the world, regularly attracting several thousand participants. It is held every year in a different European country. It is organised by changing local organisation committees which are supported by the European Juggling Association (EJA), a non-profit association founded in 1987 in Saintes, France. Like most juggling conventions, it features a mix of workshops for jugglers, a "renegade" performance performed for participants, games, performances and a public show, usually spread out over a period of a week in the European summer. Accommodation is usually in the form of tents provided by participants.

== History ==
The first EJC was inspired by the IJA Festival and organised by jugglers who didn't want to travel to the USA. The IJA helped by giving the organisers a list (known as the roster) of IJA members living in Europe. It was also known as the "first European IJA mini-convention" and had an attendance of 11 jugglers from 5 countries. EJC has now grown much bigger than its inspiration and has much less focus on competitive juggling, but is more about the sharing of juggling.

== List of European Juggling Conventions ==
| No. | Location | Year | Dates | Attendance | Organiser | Link |
|---|---|---|---|---|---|---|
| 1 | Brighton, United Kingdom | 1978 | April 15 - April 16 | 11 | Lynn Thomas | |
| 2 | Newport-on-Tay, United Kingdom | 1979 | April 14 - April 16 | 25 | Lindsay Leslie | |
| 3 | London, United Kingdom | 1980 | March 28 - March 30 | 42 | Tim Batson | |
| 4 | London, United Kingdom | 1981 | September 18 - September 20 | 100 | Tim Batson | |
| 5 | Copenhagen, Denmark | 1982 | September 10 - September 12 | 110 | Jonglorer md Tyngdekaften | |
| 6 | Laval, France | 1983 | September 16 - September 18 | 200 | L'Institut de Jonglage | |
| 7 | Frankfurt, Germany | 1984 | September 13 - September 16 | 400 | Schwerkraft Na Und | |
| 8 | Louvain la Neuve, Belgium | 1985 | September 5 - September 8 | 550 | Cirque de Trottoir | |
| 9 | Castellar de la Frontera, Spain | 1986 | September 18 - September 21 | 350 | Javier Jiminez, Hermann Klink, Fritz Brehm, Toby Philpott | |
| 10 | Saintes, France | 1987 | September 17 - September 20 | 1000 | L'Institut de Jonglage | |
| 11 | Bradford, United Kingdom | 1988 | September 22 - September 25 | 1000 | Sam Scurfield | |
| 12 | Maastricht, Netherlands | 1989 | August 31 - September 3 | 2000 | Stichting 12th European Juggling Festival | |
| 13 | Oldenburg, Germany | 1990 | August 30 - September 2 | 2500 | Verein zur Förderung des Freizeitsports e.V. | |
| 14 | Verona, Italy | 1991 | August 29 - September 1 | 2300 | EJA: represented by Jules Howarth, Pippa Stockting, Doug Orten | |
| 15 | Banyoles, Spain | 1992 | August 20 - August 24 | 1500 | Sue Hunt | |
| 16 | Leeds, United Kingdom | 1993 | September 1 - September 5 | 1800 | Up in the Air Ltd. | |
| 17 | Hagen, Germany | 1994 | August 2 - August 7 | 2000 | EJA (Deutschland) e.V. | |
| 18 | Gothenburg, Sweden | 1995 | August 11 - August 18 | 1100 | Snöbollen | |
| 19 | Grenoble, France | 1996 | August 12 - August 18 | 2200 | Association Entre ciel et terre | |
| 20 | Turin, Italy | 1997 | September 1 - September 6 | 1000 | Just for Joy European Association | |
| 21 | Edinburgh, United Kingdom | 1998 | August 3 - August 8 | 2000 | EJC98 Ltd. | |
| 22 | Grenoble, France | 1999 | August 12 - August 18 | 2300 | Association Entre ciel et terre | |
| 23 | Karlsruhe, Germany | 2000 | August 5 - August 12 | 2750 | Pyramidaler Kleinkunst-Verein e.V. | |
| 24 | Rotterdam, Netherlands | 2001 | August 4 - August 12 | 3500 | Stichting EJC2001 | |
| 25 | Bremen, Germany | 2002 | August 8 - August 16 | 2200 | Zirkuswerkstatt e.V. | |
| 26 | Svendborg, Denmark | 2003 | August 5 - August 13 | 2300 | E.J.C. 2003 Svendborg | |
| 27 | Carvin, France | 2004 | July 25 - August 1 | 4487 | Ch'ti Cirq | |
| 28 | Ptuj, Slovenia | 2005 | August 14 - August 20 | 3550 | Rokodelci Juggling Association | |
| 29 | Millstreet, Ireland | 2006 | July 9 - July 16 | 2252 | JCEvents Ltd. | |
| 30 | Athens, Greece | 2007 | July 30 - August 5 | 2300 | | |
| 31 | Karlsruhe, Germany | 2008 | August 2 - August 10 | 6800 | Pyramidaler KleinKunst-Verein | |
| 32 | Vitoria-Gasteiz, Spain | 2009 | July 4 - July 12 | 4200 | | |
| 33 | Joensuu, Finland | 2010 | July 24 - August 1 | 1200 | Sirkus Supiainen ry | |
| 34 | Munich, Germany | 2011 | August 6 - August 14 | 7200 | EJC 2011 e.V. | |
| 35 | Lublin, Poland | 2012 | July 28 - August 5 | 1540 | Fundacja Sztukmistrze | |
| 36 | Toulouse, France | 2013 | July 27 - August 4 | 4500 | L’association Par Haz’Art | |
| 37 | Millstreet, Ireland | 2014 | July 19 - July 27 | 2345 | Circus Events Ltd. | |
| 38 | Bruneck, Italy | 2015 | August 1 - August 9 | 4042 | | |
| 39 | Almere, Netherlands | 2016 | July 30 - August 7 | 5417 | Stichting Europees Jongleerfestival 2016 | |
| 40 | Lublin, Poland | 2017 | July 22 - July 30 | 2440 | Fundacja Sztukmistrze | |
| 41 | Azores, Portugal | 2018 | July 28 - August 5 | 1300+ | Associação Cultural de Artes Circenses dos Açores - 9'Circos | |
| 42 | Newark, United Kingdom | 2019 | August 3 - August 11 | 4426 | Red Hat Events | |
| 43 | ~~Hanko, Finland~~ (on-line) | 2021 | ~~July 17 - July 25~~ | | ~~Sirkus Magenta~~ | |
| 44 | Tres Cantos, Spain | 2022 | August 6 - August 14 | 3200 | Asociación Circo Diverso tres cantos | |
| 45 | Lublin, Poland | 2023 | July 29 - August 6 | 2311 | Fundacja Sztukmistrze | |
| 46 | Ovar, Portugal | 2024 | July 27 - August 4 | 2799 | | |
| 47 | Arnhem, Netherlands | 2025 | August 2 - August 10 | 6573 | Stichting Europees Jongleerfestival | |
| 48 | Ptuj, Slovenia | 2026 | August 1 - August 9 | | | |
| 49 | Azores, Portugal | 2027 | July 24 - August 1 | | Associação de Juventude Aprender a Viver (AJAV) | |
| 50 | Espinho, Portugal | 2028 | July 29 - August 6 | | | |
| 51 | Lublin, Poland | 2029 | | | | |

== See also ==
- British Juggling Convention
- International Jugglers' Association
- World Juggling Federation

== Format ==
The European Juggling Convention (EJC) typically takes place over the course of one week during the summer and includes a wide range of activities such as workshops, professional performances, public gala shows, open stages, competitions, games, parades and informal practice sessions. The programme is largely based on peer-to-peer knowledge sharing, with participants themselves leading many of the workshops and training sessions.

Unlike competitive juggling festivals, the EJC places emphasis on collaboration, experimentation and the open exchange of techniques and creative practices between amateur and professional circus artists.

== Participation ==
The convention regularly attracts several thousand participants from across Europe and beyond, including hobbyists, students, educators and professional performers working in contemporary circus and street arts disciplines. In recent decades, attendance has frequently reached between 3,000 and 7,000 participants representing more than 50 countries.

Most attendees camp on-site for the duration of the event, contributing to a temporary international community centred around circus arts, movement practices and creative expression.

== Organisation ==
Each edition of the EJC is organised by a local volunteer-based organising committee in cooperation with the European Juggling Association (EJA), a non-profit organisation founded in 1987 to support the continuity and development of the convention.

The event operates according to a decentralised organisational model, with hosting responsibilities rotating annually between different European countries. The European Juggling Association provides guidance, documentation and logistical support to ensure knowledge transfer between organising teams from year to year.

== Cultural significance ==
Over time, the EJC has become one of the largest gatherings of contemporary circus practitioners worldwide and serves as an important platform for intercultural exchange, informal education and artistic development within the international juggling and circus community.
