= International Jugglers' Association =

Nonprofit circus organization

- Abbreviation: IJA
- Founded: 1947; 79 years ago
- Type: 501(c)(3)
- Tax ID no.: 16-1111652
- Legal status: Nonprofit organization
- Purpose: To enhance the art of juggling globally.
- Chair: Benjamin Domask-Ruh (2025)
- Revenue: $211,458 (2019)
- Expenses: $192,731 (2019)
- Volunteers: 75 (2019)
- Website: www.juggle.org

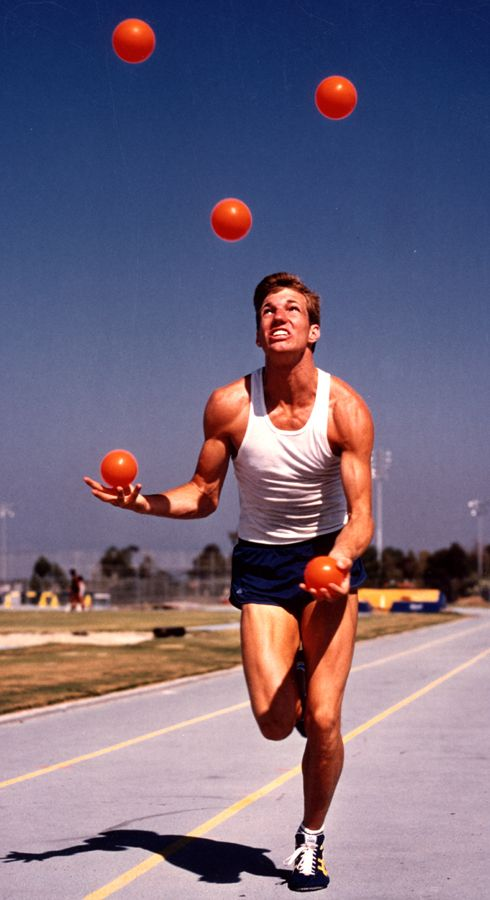
Two-time Guinness World Record-holder Owen Morse joggling during the 1988 IJA festival

The International Jugglers' Association or IJA is the world's oldest and largest nonprofit circus organization, and is open to members worldwide. It was founded in the United States in 1947, with the goal of providing, "an organization for jugglers that would provide meetings at regular intervals in an atmosphere of mutual friendship."

== Programs and events ==
The International Jugglers' Association runs the following programs and events:

- IJA Regional Competitions (IRC) - stage juggling competitions at festivals around the world
- World Juggling Day - worldwide celebration of juggling
- eJuggle - the IJA's official publication

== Conventions and competitions ==
The International Jugglers' Association holds the largest week-long juggling festival in North America. (The largest juggling festival in the world is the European Juggling Convention, started in 1978 and whose founders were members of the International Jugglers' Association).

The convention is held in a different city each year during mid-to-late July since 1948. There were also additional winter conventions in the 90s. Aside from the competitions, at the convention there are: shows open to the public in which professional jugglers perform; workshops taught by jugglers of all skill levels; and a gym in which hobbyists through professionals get together to juggle.

The organization maintains lists of IJA record-holders, and IJA competitors.

The Numbers Championships awards Gold, Silver, and Bronze medals to those who demonstrate that they can juggle the most balls, clubs or rings for the highest number of catches. Competition occurs in three categories: Individuals, Duos and Trios. See the current IJA records.

== IJA Juggling Championships ==
The IJA's Juggling Championships are the formal world juggling championships that offers medals and prize money for juggling performances. These competitions are held during the week at the IJA's annual festival, held in the summer. There are three divisions in the IJA Juggling Championships: Individuals (individual competitors), Teams (two or more people per team) and Juniors (individuals 17 years old or younger). The first annual world juggling championships were held at the Sheraton West Hotel in Los Angeles in 1969.

Year	Individual	Teams	Juniors
1969	(gold) George Zsilak	N/A	N/A
1970	(gold) Danny Rees	N/A	N/A
1971	(gold) Tommy Curtain	N/A	N/A
1972	N/A	N/A	N/A
1973	(gold) Jerry Greenberg	N/A	(gold) Martin Gray
1974	N/A	N/A	(gold) Nate Stein
1975	N/A	N/A	(gold) Peter Cuneen
1976	N/A	N/A	(gold) Norm Johnson
1977	N/A	N/A	(gold) Lenny Mazel
1978	N/A	(gold) Fred Garbo, Allan Jacobs	(gold) Ben Decker
1979	(gold) Edward Jackman; (silver) Larry Vaksman; (bronze) Peter Davison	(gold) The Wimbledon Brothers (Dan Berg, Bruce Pfeffer); (silver) J. Held, B. Felker; (bronze) Locomotion Circus (Bounce, Cyrus, Flip)	(gold) Lindsey Morris; (silver) Maria Alcarese; (bronze) Nguyen Phuc
1980	(gold) Michael Kass; (silver) Edward Jackman; (bronze) Larry Vaksman	(gold) Magnificent Material Movers; (silver) ISU Gamma Phi Jugglers (Dan Berg, Pete Schulte, John Burns, Greg Grimstad); (bronze) Les Foubrac	(gold) Kezia Tenenbaum; (silver) Nick Newlin; (bronze) Jon Leffingwell
1981	(gold) Tommy Curtin; (silver) Edward Jackman; (bronze) Allan Jacobs	(gold) Gravity's Last Stand (Carville, Fry, Gagnepain); (silver) L.A. Juggling Company (Rosen, Jackman); (bronze) Up In the Air Juggling Club (Boyer, Friedman)	(gold) Anthony Gatto; (silver) Patrick Dempsey; (bronze) John Webster
1982	(gold) Peter Davison; (silver) Anthony Gatto; (bronze) Michael Marlin	(gold) Airjazz (Davison, Held, Tenenbaum); (silver) Gravity's Last Stand (Carvill, Jim Gagnepain, Matt Gagnepain); (bronze) Not Awarded	(gold) Andrew Allen; (silver) John Webster; (bronze) Christa Rypins
1983	(gold) Allan Jacobs; (silver) Edward Jackman; (bronze) Anthony Gatto	(gold) Bryan Wendling, Scott Burton; (silver) Jongleur Jugglers; (bronze) Raspyni Brothers	(gold) David Deeble; (silver) Rick Coleman; (bronze) Patrick Cox
1984	(gold) Albert Lucas; (silver) Mark Nizer; (bronze) Dan Holzman	(gold) Raspyni Brothers (Dan Holzman, Barry Friedman); (silver) Young Gentlemen Jugglers (John Webster, Robert Stuverud); (bronze) Circus Shmirkus (Steve Westren, Fred Stinson)	(gold) David Lee; (silver) Dana Tison; (bronze) Robbie Weinstein
1985	(gold) Andrew Head; (silver) Dan Holzman; (bronze) Arsene	(gold) Benji Hill, Dana Tison; (silver) Benji Marantz, Tom Murphy; (bronze) Live Aid	(gold) Ken Falk; (silver) Robbie Weinstein; (bronze) Bogar Zuniga
1986	(gold) Anthony Gatto; (silver) Scott Burton; (bronze) Benji Hill	(gold) Jet Set Jugglers (Eastman Webber, Richard Chesbrough; (silver) Raspyni Brothers (Dan Holzman, Barry Friedman); (bronze) Jongleur Jugglers (John Creveling, Mike Stillwell, Yvonne Wetherell)	(gold) Robbie Weinstein; (silver) OranCanfield; (bronze) Mark Bakalor
1987	(gold) Benji Hill; (silver) Jeff Mason; (bronze) Dana Tison	(gold) Manic Expressions (K.C. Canter, Tommy Gabriel, Mark Lippard); (silver) Raspyni Brothers (Barry Friedman, Dan Holzman); (bronze) Doubble Troubble (Nick, Alex Karvounis)	(gold) Curt Bonnem; (silver) David Cain; (bronze) Mark Faje
1988	(gold) Jeff Mason; (silver) Ryder Schwartz; (bronze) Benji Hill	(gold) Raspyni Brothers (Dan Holzman, Barry Friedman); (silver) Passing Zone (Owen Morse, Jon Wee); (bronze) Philippine Pride Jugglers (Emily Cafina, Regina Tayko, Joyce Bonachita, Irlopal Macabinguil	(gold) Jason Garfield; (silver) Matt Linnell; (bronze) Clarke Mcfarlane
1989	(gold) Cindy Marvell; (silver) Larry Vee; (bronze) Michael Menes	(gold) The Passing Zone (Owen Morse, Jon Wee); (silver) Doubble Troubble (Nick, Alex Kervounis); (bronze) Clockwork (Jack Kalvan, Rick Rubenstein)	(gold) Jonathan Rosenberg; (silver) Brian Patz; (bronze) Alfonso Guerra
1990	(gold) Mark Nizer; (silver) Carlos Rodriguez; (bronze) Dan Holzman	(gold) Darn, Good and Funny (Kevin Holman, Karen Phariss, Paul Phariss); (silver) Raspyni Brothers (Dan Holzman, Barry Friedman); (bronze) Not Awarded	(gold) Chuck Gunter; (silver) Joel Purcell; (bronze) Brian Patz
1991	(gold) Not Awarded; (silver) Andrew Head; (bronze) Jason Garfield, Dana Tison, Tuey Wilson	(gold) Not Awarded; (silver) Doubble Troubble (Nick, Alex Karivounis); (bronze) Clockwork (Rick Rubenstein, Jack Kalvan)	(gold) Pat McGuire; (silver) Brian Patz; Sean Mckinney
1992	(gold) Not Awarded; (silver) Miguel Herrera, Dan Holzman, Dimitri Mourkes; (bronze) France Robert, Larry Vee, Bob Whitcomb	(gold) Not Awarded; (silver) Chuck Gunter, Benji Hill; (bronze) Dew Drop Jugglers (Jason LeMay, Michael Lunzer, Jeff Kasper)	(gold) Sean McKinney; (silver) Ben Tolpin; (bronze) Brian Patz
1993	(gold) Fritz Grobe; (silver) Not Awarded; (bronze) Jill Westover, Eric Wenokor	(gold) Not Awarded; (silver) Benji Hill, Chuck Gunter; (bronze) Not Awarded	(gold) Jay Gilligan; (silver) Corey Hoelcker; (bronze) Jason Kariotis
1994	(gold) Tony Duncan; (silver) Brian Patz; (bronze) Martin Mall	(gold) Crash and Burn (David Cain, Jay Gilligan); (silver) Darn, Good and Funny (Kevin Holman, Paul Phariss, Cindy Marvell); (bronze) Clockwork (Jack Kalvan, Rick Rubenstein)	(gold) Joey Cousin; (silver) Artom Khomanko; (bronze) Casey Boehmer
1995	(gold) Francoise Rochais; (silver) Jay Gilligan; (bronze) Jochen Schell	(gold) Blink (Jay Gilligan, Fritz Grobe, Morty Hansen); (silver) Cousin Brothers (Dan, Joey Cousin); (bronze) Trio One Over Par (Thomas Hinte, Daniel Megnet, Dirk Meyer)	(gold) Vladik Miagkostoupov; (silver) Casey Boehmer; (bronze) Kevin Bylund
1996	(gold) Greg Kennedy; (silver) Jay Gilligan; (bronze) Brian Patz	(gold) Dew Drop Jugglers (Mick Lunzer, Jeff Kasper, Jason LeMay); (silver) Tripp and Fall (Dextre Tripp, Reid Belstock); (bronze) Not Awarded	(gold) Casey Boehmer; (silver) Mike Price; (bronze) Rick Friscia
1997	(gold) Vladik Miagkostoupov; (silver) Brian Patz; (bronze) Matt Henry	(gold) Mark, Charlie Peachock; (silver) Flight Patterns (Todd Blair, Jimmy Robertson); (bronze) Stoolies (Aaron Schettler, Reid Belstock)	(gold) Adam Kariotis; (silver) Emil Carey; (bronze) Rick Friscia
1998	(gold) Jason Garfield; (silver) Dana Tison; (bronze) Brian Patz	(gold) Les Tourisks; (silver) Raising Cain (Scott, David Cain); (bronze) Redefining Gravity (Heather Hackett-Brinegar, Darrin Marriott)	(gold) Jeff Civillico; (silver) Luke Jay; (bronze) Mike Roberts
1999	(gold) Adam Kariotis; (silver) Sean McKinney; (bronze) Jay Gilligan	(gold) The Mad Five; (silver) The Fling Kings; (bronze) Marty and Jake	(gold) Peter Gerber; (silver) Emil Carey; (bronze) Christopher Chiappini
2000	(gold) Michael Price; (silver) Jason Garfield; (bronze) Patrick McGuire	(gold) Redefining Gravity (Heather Hackett, Darin Marriott); (silver) We're Not Clowns (Scott Parker, Kelly Anzalone, Andrew Pratt); (bronze) Propellorheads (Dan Berman, Peter Frey)	(gold) Christopher Chiappini; (silver) Nate Seefeldt; (bronze) Dorothy Finnigan
2001	(gold) Matt Henry; (silver) Nicolas Souren; (bronze) Jeffery Daymont	(gold) The LaSalle Brothers (Jake, Marty LaSalle); (silver) Team Rootberry (Jonathan Root, Bill Berry); (bronze) Raising Cain (David, Scott Cain)	(gold) David DiMuzio; (silver) Nate Seefeldt; (bronze) Josiah Jones
2002	(gold) Jason Garfield; (silver) Pat McGuire; (bronze) Rod Laver	(gold) Saccade (Greg Kennedy, Chris Ivey); (silver) Team Rootberry (Jonathan Root, Bill Berry); (bronze) Stoolies (Reid Belstock, Aaron Schettler, Luke Jay)	(gold) Ryo Yabe; (silver) Josiah the Bold (Josiah Jones); (bronze) Stephen Caruso
2003	(gold) Bill Berry; (silver) Matt Hall; (bronze) Vova Galchenko	(gold) Team Rootberry (Jonathan Root, Bill Berry); (silver) Olga, Vova Galchenko; (bronze) Jugheads	(gold) Jonathan Brady; (silver) Charles "C.J." Smith Jr. (bronze) Leo James
2004	(gold) Thomas Dietz; (silver) Ivan Pecel; (bronze) Emile Carey	(gold) Olga, Vova Galchenko; (silver) Stanford Juggling Research Institute (Martin Frost, Rick Rubenstein, NeilFred Picciotto); (bronze) The Jugheads	(gold) Wes Peden; (silver) Leo James; (bronze) Edgar Mkrtchyan
2005	(gold) Ryo Yabe; (silver) Mark Kolbusz; (bronze) Cecile Poncet	(gold) Jonglissimo (Christoph, Manuel Mitasch); (silver) Kikyo Brothers (Atsushi, Takashi Kikyo; (bronze) Entropy (Tony Gonzalez, Will Oltman)	(gold) Kazuhiro Shindo; (silver) Komei Aoki; (bronze) Takashi Kikyo
2006	(gold) Artem Khomanko; (silver) Yuki Kojima; (bronze) Michael Karas	(gold) MHD (William Wei-Liang Lin, Ting-Chin Hsu); (silver) Swatch; (bronze) Vanillatown	(gold) William Wei-Liang Lin; (silver) Tony Pezzo; (bronze) Billy Watson
2007	(gold) Thomas Dietz; (silver) Wes Peden; (bronze) Vova Galchenko	(gold) Jonglissimo (Christoph, Manuel Mitasch); (silver) Kikyo Brothers (Atsushi, Takashi Kikyo; (bronze) Genetic Fallout (Scott, Amanda Richter)	(gold) Yoshiaki Nagatake; (silver) Nate Martin; (bronze) Teruki Okamoto
2008	(gold) Vova Galchenko; (silver) Billy Watson; (bronze) Yoshihisa Suehiro	(gold) Sharpe Brothers (Jacob, Nate Sharpe); (silver) Kikyo Brothers (Atsushi, Takashi Kikyo); (bronze) Taiwan Physical Education College (Ching-Ta Huang, Huang-Chin Lien	(gold) Takashi Kikyo; (silver) Chu Chuan-Ho; (bronze) Ben Hestness
2009	(gold) Doug Sayers; (silver) Billy Watson; (bronze) Yusaku Mochiduki	(gold) The Jugheads (Rory Bade, Stefan Brancel, Sean Carney, Ricky Harr, Ben Hestness Jonny Langholz, Jack Levy, Colin Revere, Amanda Richter, Scott Schultz Joey Spicola, Hanna Stoehr, David Uhr, Silas Wallen-Friedman, Brenden Ying); (silver) Smirk (Ried Belstock, Warren Hammond); (bronze) Poetic Motion Machine (Steven Dimon, Jeremiah Johnston, Jesse Johnston, Eli March	(gold) Liu-Wen Yeh; (silver) David Ferman; (bronze) Jack Levy
2010	(gold) Jordan Moir; (silver) Yu Kondo; (bronze) Ivan Pecel	(gold) Dream Team (Doug Sayers, Josh Horton); (silver) Poetic Motion Machine (Steven Dimaon, Jeremiah, Jesse Johnston, Eli March); (bronze) The Five of Clubs (Rory Bade, Sean Carney, Jack Levy, Scott Schultz, Brenden Ying	(gold) Noah Malone; (silver) David Ferman; (bronze) Lauge Benjaminsen
2011	(gold) Tony Pezzo; (silver) Kitamura Shintarou; (bronze) Tomohiro Kobayashi	(gold) Showy Motion (Stefan Brancel, Ben Hestness); (silver) Smirk (Reid Belstock, Warren Hammond); (bronze) The Jugheads (Rory Bade, Michael Barreto, Alex Behr, Daniel Burke, Sean Carney, Tom Gaasedelen, Joe Gould, Danny Gratzer, Conor Hussey, Reid Johnson, Griffin Kelley, Jonny Langholz, Jack Levy, Chris Lovdal, Mara Moettus, Chris Olson, Evan Peter, Scott Schultz, Joey Spicola, Brenden Ying)	(gold) David Ferman; (silver) Jack Denger; (bronze) Patrick Fraser
2012	(gold) Satoshi Eto; (silver) Thom Wall; (bronze) David Ferman	(gold) Daniel, Dominik; (silver) Institute of Jugglology (Galen Harp, Ellen Winters); (bronze) Kikyo Brothers (Atsushi, Takashi Kikyo)	(gold) Kellin Quinn; (silver) Jack Denger; (bronze) Ashley Ellis
2013	(gold) Kyle Driggs; (silver) Wes Peden; (bronze) Kellin Quinn	(gold) The Pastels; (silver) Kikyo Brothers; (bronze) Mountain Motion	(gold) Ashley Ellis; (silver) Yusuke Yokoyama; (bronze) Patrick Fraser
2014	(gold) Kota Hayashi; (silver) Yusaku Mochizuki; (bronze) Thom Wall	(gold) Institute of Jugglology (Galen Harp, Ellen Winters); (silver) Duck and Cover; (bronze) The Nine Hips	(gold) Jack Denger; (silver) Patrick Fraser; (bronze) Delaney Bayles
2015	(gold) Yusaku Mochizuki; (silver) Yosuke Ubukata; (bronze) Kento Tanioka	(gold) Kentokaito; (silver) The Jugheads; (bronze) The Bling Bros.	(gold) Delaney Bayles; (silver) Max Poff; (bronze) Daniel Van Hoomissen
2016	(gold) Hiroki Kamei; (silver) Jorden Moir; (bronze) Scott Sorensen	(gold) Jonglissimo (Daniel Ledel, Dominik Harant, Manuel Mitasch); (silver) Totchees (Tetuya Tochikubo, Ayaka Tochikubo); (bronze) Aki and Takeru	(gold) Jonah Botvinick-Greenhouse; (silver) Christopher Haaser; (bronze) Bennett Santora
2017	(gold) Hayato Watanabe; (silver) Shinya Yamane; (bronze) Delaney Bayles	(gold) CAPT – New Style Crew (Thean Leong Hng, Pei-Chen Jung, Wei-Hsuan Chang, Meng-Ti Hsieh, Yu-Ping Chiang); (silver) CAPT (Yu Cheng Lu, Chin Yao Yang); (bronze) Duo Octo (Peter Irish, Jordan Moir)	(gold) Bennett Santora; (silver) Christopher Haaser; (bronze) Houston Odum
2018	(gold) Masayuki Furuya; (silver) Jonah Botvinick-Greenhouse; (bronze) Makoto Hanada	(gold) Cosmic Cousins (Eli March, Nate Hughes); (silver) KK Staff (Keiichiro Kato, Takumi Ohkura); (bronze) The LemonHeads (Isaac Cantor, Joshua Nelson	(gold) Sho Kasuya; (silver) Grant Bishop; (bronze) Christopher Haaser
2019	(gold) Zak McAllister; (silver) Eric Jackson; (bronze) Elia Taylor	(gold) Zak and Delaney; (silver) CBO Juggling Team; (bronze) Jugheads	(gold) Christopher Haaser; (silver) Kyle Albrecht
2022	(gold) Ho Lam Pun; (silver) Kathryn Carr; (bronze) Futa Fujimoto	N/A	(gold) Matthew Walmsley; (silver) LilyRuth Mamary; (bronze) Leona Barocas
2023	(gold) Shih Rong Huang; (silver) Michael Karas; (bronze) Matan Presberg	(gold) Manuel Mitasch & Moritz Rosner	N/A
2024	(gold) Delaney Bayles; (silver) Galen Harp; (bronze) Gideon Elson	(gold) Daniel & Julius; (silver) Smile Group Canada	(gold) Stefan Hart; (silver) Chu-Huan Wang; (bronze) Atticus Abraham
2025	(gold) Sereno Aguilar Izzo; (silver) Jack Denger; (bronze) Alexander Tai	(gold) GOBSMACK; (silver) The Gravity Doctors; (bronze) The Relection	(gold) Tamino Patricio Soto; (silver) Luo-Hua Wang; (bronze) Easton Smith

== IJA Online Juggling Championships ==
In response to COVID-19, IJA created an annual event based on IJA Juggling Championships normally held at the annual IJA Festival, but with some modifications to accommodate the circumstances. Instead of a live event, videos submissions judged by the entire attending IJA membership in five categories of Juggling Difficulty, Juggling Creativity, Juggling Execution, Entertainment Value, and Presentation.

Year	Individual	Teams	Juniors
2020	(gold) Hazel Bock; (silver) Kohei Itabashi	N/A	(gold) David Pavlove Cunsolo; (silver) Zaila Avant-garde; (bronze) Thomas Whitaker
2021	(gold) Adam Dipert; (silver) Cinthia “La Flaka” Buitrón; (bronze) Keisuke Yamazaki	(gold) Raising Cain	(gold) Nikolai Marshall; (silver) Ella Catanzaro; (bronze) Janice Chao

== Notable members ==
- Thomas Dietz
- Vova Galchenko
- Marcus Monroe
- Christoph Mitasch
- Manuel Mitasch
- The Passing Zone
- Thom Wall
- Sergeij Ignatov
- Anthony Gatto
- Erin Stephens
- Ronald Graham

== See also ==
- European Juggling Association
- World Juggling Federation
