= World Juggling Federation =

- Abbreviation: WJF
- Formation: 2000; 26 years ago
- Type: 501(c)(3)
- Purpose: Promote sport juggling
- Founder and President: Jason Garfield
- Website: www.thewjf.com

The World Juggling Federation (WJF) is the world's only organization devoted to the promotion and advancement of juggling as a sport (competitive juggling).

== History ==
In 2000, long-time IJA member Jason Garfield founded the WJF. Garfield attracted interest and membership by framing the skills of juggling as a sport. The WJF broadcast its first juggling convention on ESPN2 in January 2005 and its second convention on ESPN later the same year. In 2021, the WJF was reestablished as a 501(c)(3) organization and announced its goal to create a juggling event at the Olympics.

== Competition ==
The WJF's most well-known event is the WJF convention, which has been broadcast on ESPN2. The organization encourages jugglers to compete against each other in order to get better. In WJF-sponsored events, the participants use juggling props, which include: Balls, Rings, Clubs, Cigar boxes, Diabolos, and Devil Sticks.

WJF competition events sometimes include (pending enough competitors attending):

- Club passing
- 360s (and similar)
- Endurance
- Isolated Endurance
- Freestyle
- Extreme Competitions

There are "junior"-, "beginner"-, "intermediate"- and "advanced"-level competitors in each of the three main WJF disciplines.

== Conventions and championships ==
Annual WJF conventions are held; and juggling competitions produce annual winners who are named "overall champions". At WJF 5, the top competition event ran alongside the Battle for the WJF Presidency, with Thomas Dietz as the inaugural winner, beating Jason Garfield. However, Dietz resigned from presidency soon after, saying he didn't have time to fulfill his duties as president. At WJF 7 in 2011, Doug Sayers was initially named overall champion, but due to a miscount of the scores this was proved not to be the case, as Vova had scored more points overall.

WJF Competitions
Year	Event	Location	Competition
2004	WJF Convention	Las Vegas, Nevada	
2005	WJF2	Las Vegas, Nevada	Thomas Dietz, Overall champion
2006	WJF3	Las Vegas, Nevada	Thomas Dietz, Overall champion
2007	WJF4	Hartford, Connecticut	Thomas Dietz, Overall champion
2008	WJF5	Las Vegas, Nevada	Thomas Dietz, Overall champion.
2010	WJF6	Las Vegas, Nevada	Doug Sayers, Overall champion.
2011	WJF7	Springfield, Illinois	Vova Galchenko, Overall champion
2012	WJF8	Sioux Falls, South Dakota	Doug Sayers, Overall champion
2013	WJF9	Las Vegas, Nevada	Jonah Botvinick-Greenhouse, Overall champion
2014	WJF10	Las Vegas, Nevada	Doug Sayers, Overall champion
2015	WJF11	Las Vegas, Nevada	Jonah Botvinick-Greenhouse, Overall champion
2016	WJF12	Las Vegas, Nevada	Delaney Bayles, Overall champion
2017	WJF13	Las Vegas, Nevada	Spencer Androli, Overall champion
2018	WJF14	Las Vegas, Nevada	Christian Hauschild, Overall champion
2019	WJF15	Las Vegas, Nevada	Eivind Dragsjø, Overall champion
2021	WJF16	Las Vegas, Nevada	Spencer Androli, Overall champion
2022	WJF17	Las Vegas, Nevada	Spencer Androli, Overall champion
