= Zach Warren =

American circus performer and psychologist (born 1981)

Zach Warren (born 1981) is an American circus performer and psychologist. In 2005, he began working with the Afghan Mobile Mini Children's Circus and was Director of Policy Research for The Asia Foundation between 2014-2017. He is known for breaking world records in unicycling and juggling.

== Education ==
Warren is an alumnus of Earlham College with a degree in Human Development and Social Relations, Harvard Divinity School, and Georgetown University. His PhD advisor was Fathali M. Moghaddam.

== Juggling ==
In 2005 and 2006, he broke the Guinness World Record for "fastest marathon while juggling," with a time of 2 hours and 52 minutes, but lost the record to Canadian Michal Kapral in 2007. The battle between Warren and Kapral is featured in the 2011 documentary film Breaking and Entering.

== See also ==
- Joggling
