= Toronto Marathon =

- Date: May
- Location: Toronto, Ontario, Canada
- Event type: Road
- Distance: Marathon, Half marathon, 10K, 5K
- Beneficiary: Princess Margaret Hospital Foundation
- Established: 1977
- Course records: Men's: 2:15:17 (2000) (Morocco) Mostafa El Damaoui; Women's: 2:31:47 (2004) (Russia) Olga Kovpotina
- Website: Toronto Marathon
- Participants: 8,486 (2019)

The Toronto Marathon, held annually on the first Sunday of May, is a race from North York's Yonge and Sheppard intersection, down Yonge Street to the Exhibition Place, via Humber Bay Park. The origins of the event trace back to 1977, and the race was initially called the Canadian International Marathon. In 2003, its name was changed to the Toronto Marathon. It was held previously on the third Sunday in October, the first Sunday after Canadian Thanksgiving, for 16 consecutive years. In 2011, the race was moved to May due to pressure from the government of Toronto over repeated road closures in October due to the Toronto Waterfront Marathon also held that month and from Scotiabank, the sponsor of the Waterfront Marathon. The Toronto Marathon was moved to the first Sunday of May in 2012. The event was temporarily held mid-May in 2011, due to other events in the city that year.

In addition to a full marathon, the event also includes a half marathon, a 10K run, a 5K run, and an eight-person relay across the marathon course. The marathon meets international standards and is a qualifier for the Boston Marathon. The event is a member of AIMS and Athletics Ontario and meets their criteria.

The race featured women marathoners prior to the opening of the Olympic competition for the women. In 1984, Anne Hird won the race as winds gusted and a large field pursued her. In 1988, the winner was Susan Stone, who had just become the Canadian National Champion in the 10K two weeks prior to the race.

Regularly attracting 8,000 to 10,000 participants from over 55 countries, and every Province and Territory in Canada, the event is also a major fundraiser for many charities. A Runners Expo is held on the Friday and Saturday at the Queen Elizabeth building on the Exhibition Grounds immediately prior to race day and features over 60 vendors as well as the race kit pick-up for event participants.

== COVID-19 pandemic ==
Due to the COVID-19 pandemic, the 2020 edition of the race was cancelled, while the 2021 edition of the race was virtualized, as organizers stated that COVID-19 vaccine distribution will not be wide enough by May 2021 in order to allow the live in-person racing event to be safely held by that spring.

== 2018 distance controversy ==
In 2018, the Toronto Marathon was accused of having an incorrect distance. Participants using GPS devices believed that the marathon course was 43km even though it was supposed to be 42.2km. The organizers claim that this is not true and that "the distance is 100 per cent correct" The course was proven to be measured correctly and km points designated accurate. It is known that when using a GPS, the signal can be inaccurate, especially around tall structures like those found in the downtown core, and that it caused an inaccurate reading for some runners using this technology. The course is certified by AIMS and Athletics Canada meeting their measurement criteria and is re-surveyed every 5 to 10 years as required by these respective organizations.

== List of Marathon winners ==
Year	Winner men	Nationality	Time	Winner women	Nationality	Time
2026	Davide Zanetti	Austria	2:25:08	Philes Ongori	Canada	2:40:36
2025	Phil White	United States	2:23:58	Ana Laura Fray	Canada	2:50:40
2024	Alex Bernst	Canada	2:29:31	Philes Ongori	Canada	2:50:54
2023	Marco Li	Canada	2:34:55	Brittney Hall	United States	2:42:56
2022	Dennis Mbelenzi	Canada	2:29:57	Marianne Hogan	Canada	2:47:58
2021	Race cancelled due to the COVID-19 pandemic					
2020	Race cancelled due to the COVID-19 pandemic					
2019	Ken Langat	Canada	2:28:52	Dale Findlay	Canada	2:54:00
2018	David Freake	Canada	2:33:57	Julie Hamulecki	Canada	2:52:10
2017	Peter Kemboi	Canada	2:41:06	Michelle Spencer	Canada	3:00:30
2016	Bryan Rusche	Canada	2:35:54	Julie Hamulecki	Canada	2:56:04
2015	David Le Porho	Canada	2:21:54	Jutta Merilainen	Canada	3:00:45
2014	Brendan Kenny	Canada	2:26:25	Rachel Sinasac	Canada	2:55:18
2013	Terry Gehl	Canada	2:37:31	Mylene Sansourci	Canada	2:58:22
2012	Brendan Kenny	Canada	2:27:57	Jutta Merilainen	Canada	2:47:17
2011	Brendan Kenny	Canada	2:27:19.2	Melissa Begin	United States	2:54:50.9
2010	Brandon Laan	Canada	2:23:38.1	Nathalie Goyer	Canada	2:52:50.5
2009	Paul Rugut	Kenya	2:26:08.6	Elizabeth Randell	United States	2:57:53.8
2008	Daniel Njenga	Kenya	2:29:00.0	Dawn Richardson	Bermuda	2:57:46.8
2007	Charles Bedley	Canada	2:21:58.8	Leslie Black	Canada	2:58:47.0
2006	Anthony Skuce	Canada	2:34.10	Nicole Stevenson	Canada	2:47.09
2005	David Cheruiyot	Kenya	2:17.12	Lyudmila Korchagina	Canada	2:37.17
2004	Procopio Hernández	Mexico	2:16.42	Olga Kovpotina	Russia	2:31.47
2003	Lemi Chengere	Ethiopia	2:25.55	Angela Batsford	Canada	2:55.04
2002	Michal Kapral	Canada	2:30.40	Karen Cowling	Canada	2:56.13
2001	Jackson Omweri	Kenya	2:22.22	Karen Cowling	Canada	2:56.02
2000	Mostafa El Damaoui	Morocco	2:15.17	Jennifer Cooper	Canada	2:59.04
1999	Manuel Salvati	Canada	2:28.25	Allison McKenzie	Canada	2:59.50
1998	Nick Tsioros	Canada	2:41.49	Carolyn Walker	Canada	3:07.57
1997	Peter Fonseca	Canada	2:28.26	Gaylene Pridham	Canada	2:58.24
1996	Paul Mbugua	Kenya	2:20.33	Kim Webb	Canada	2:37.52
1995	David O'Keefe	United States	2:23.15	Laura Ruptash	Canada	2:49.19

== See also ==
- List of marathon races in North America
