= Raymond Monsour Scurfield =

Raymond Monsour Scurfield (born 1943) is an American professor emeritus of social work, The University of Southern Mississippi, Gulf Coast. He retired in November, 2021 from private practice (with Rivers Psychotherapy Services in Gulfport MS). He continued as the external clinical consultant to the Biloxi VA Vet Center from 2011 to 2022. He has been recognized for his expertise in war-related and natural disaster Psychological trauma and in meditation. He has published books and articles exploring the effects of post traumatic stress disorder (PTSD) in both combat veterans and disaster survivors, including a trilogy of books about war's impact.

Scurfield has also written substantially about the impact of Hurricane Katrina, and helpful interventions to address post-Katrina mental health recovery. Scurfield was recognized as a "Hero of Katrina" by the University of Southern Mississippi (2006), the 2006 Mississippi Social Worker of the Year by the Mississippi Chapter of the National Association of Social Workers, the 2006 and 2007 College of Health Distinguished Teaching Awards and 10 additional awards and recognitions during his tenure at Southern Miss. He received the 2012 Mississippi Lifetime Achievement Award from the Mississippi chapter, National Association of Social Work, and the NASW National Lifetime Achievement Award. Scurfield has a reputation in posttraumatic stress disorder (PTSD) as a clinician, innovative therapy and program developer, educator, and researcher publishing on topics such as Vietnam War and other war-related trauma, post-disaster interventions, race-related trauma, and experientially-based therapy.

== Early life ==
Scurfield was born in Chicago, Illinois, on August 3, 1943, and raised in Elizabeth, Pennsylvania, about 16 miles outside of Pittsburgh. In 1961 Scurfield enrolled at Dickinson College in Carlise, Pennsylvania. Scurfield was commissioned in the Army Medical Service Corps upon his graduation from Dickinson College in 1965.

Scurfield served four years on active duty in the Army (1967–71) as a social work officer. His first duty assignment was as outpatient clinic social worker at William Beaumont General Hospital in El Paso, Texas. He then was deployed to Nha Trang, South Vietnam, in March 1968, and was the social work and administrative officer on a psychiatric team treating psychiatric casualties from I and II Corps of South Vietnam. Scurfield was promoted from second lieutenant to first lieutenant, and then to captain, during his deployment to Vietnam. His next duty assignment was as a chief social worker, psychiatric ward, Army Valley Forge General Hospital outside of Philadelphia, for four months. His final assignment was to Okinawa, where he served first as the social work officer and then the Chief, Army Community Service. He was discharged from active duty in May 1971.

Scurfield gained a bachelor's degree in Sociology/Anthropology in 1965, and then a master's degree in social work (1967) and doctorate in social work (1979) from the University of Southern California.

== Career and publications ==
During 1971–72 and 1974–82, Scurfield held several positions at the Brentwood (West Los Angeles) VA Medical Center, including director of the Vietnam Veterans Resocialization Unit and supervisor of the Veterans-in-Prison Program. He was a community social worker with the Queen Liliuokalani Children's Center in Hilo and lower Puna on the Big Island of Hawaii (1972–73). Scurfield was appointed to the national-level position of National Associate Director for Clinical Services from 1982 to 1985 with the VA's Readjustment Counseling Service (the Vet Center Program) at VA HQ in Washington, D.C. Scurfield spent seven years (1985 to 1991) in the Gig Harbor/Tacoma/Seattle area, founding and directing the Post Traumatic Stress Treatment Program at the American Lake VAMC that received national and international attention for innovative trauma healing strategies (helicopter ride therapy; Outward Bound river rafting and rappelling ventures; sweatlodge and Pow-Wow warrior recognition American-Indian-led healing rituals; and then five years (1992 to 1997) in Hawaii, founding and directing the Pacific Islands Division, VA National Center for PTSD that pioneered the inclusion of culturally-sensitive Native Hawaiian healing elements and a focus on Asian-Pacific Islander veterans throughout the Pacific, to include establishing the first VA outreach PTSD service in America Samoa. In 1997, he served in a one-year position with the VA's National Center for PTSD and was outstationed at the Gulfport Division of the Biloxi VA in Mississippi.

In 1998, he retired from the VA and accepted a tenure track position at the University of Southern Mississippi School of Social Work, based at Long Beach. During his 13-year faculty tenure, he received some 15 awards for teaching and service (to include being the 2006 Mississippi Social Worker of the Year (by NASW) and designated as a "Hero of Katrina" by the University of Southern Mississippi—both awards in recognition of his leadership and counseling/debriefing services to displaced faculty, staff and students. And then he was appointed as a Professor Emeritus of Social Work upon his retirement in 2011. He has made 400+ professional presentations nationwide and numerous media appearances, to include 60 Minutes, Nightline, National Public Radio, New York Times, Boston Globe and many other newspaper and media interviews.

Scurfield was a pioneer in returning to Vietnam with veterans with PTSD to help in their healing process. In 1989 he co-led, with April Gerlock, the first return trip to Vietnam by a therapy group of veterans with PTSD. This trip was filmed by PBS and produced as a documentary in 1990, titled Two Decades and a Wake-up. This return trip also was a focus in Scurfield's first book about Vietnam in 2004 (A Vietnam Trilogy. Veterans and Post-Traumatic Stress, 1968, 1989 & 2000). Scurfield then co-led the first university-based study abroad course to Vietnam (in 2000, with Andy Wiest and Leslie Root). This trip was a major focus of Scurfield's second book about Vietnam: Healing Journeys: Study Abroad with Vietnam Veterans (2006).

Scurfield's two most recent books are: Scurfield, R.M. & Platoni, K.T. (2013). Healing War Trauma. A Handbook of Creative Approaches (Routledge); and Scurfield, (2019), Faith-Based & Secular Meditation: Everyday and Posttraumatic Applications (Washington, DC: NASW Press). He was co-editor with Anthony J. Marsella, Matthew J. Friedman and Ellen T. Gerrity of a 2019 volume for the American Psychological Association entitled Ethnocultural Aspects of Posttraumatic Stress Disorder: Issues, Research, and Clinical Applications.
