= Staircase model =

Psychology of terrorism

The staircase model is a psychological explanation as to why, out of large numbers of disgruntled people in society, only a very small minority end up committing acts of terrorism. It was proposed in 2005 by Fathali M. Moghaddam in his paper "The Staircase to Terrorism". The model involves a metaphorical staircase, where each step is influenced by a specific psychological process. It is proposed that the higher an individual moves up the staircase, the fewer alternatives to violence they will see, ultimately resulting in the destruction of themselves, others, or both.

== Background ==
Moghaddam observed that societal-level variables, such as lack of democratic processes, social inequality, availability of weapons and rapid demographic changes, do not explain why only a small percentage of people living under the same adverse conditions end up committing acts of violence against innocent targets. He proposed the staircase model to explain this phenomenon, describing the pathway to terrorism as a narrowing staircase, that very few people reach the top of.

== Model ==
The model involves six floors.

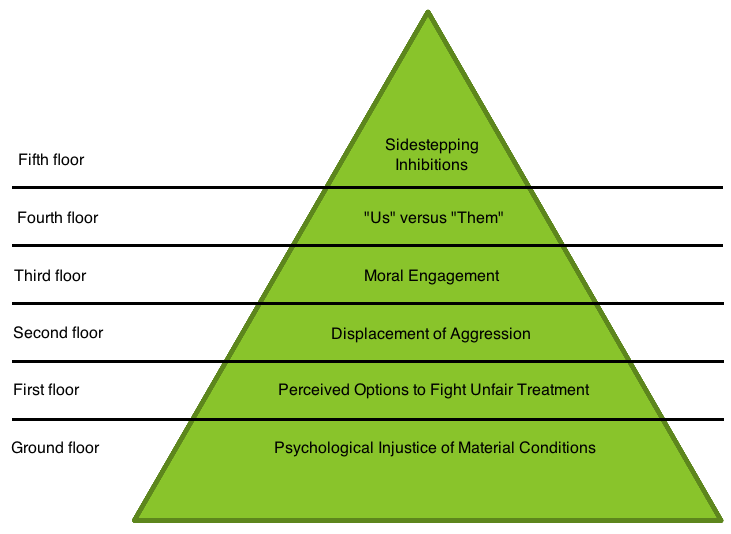
Diagram of the staircase model

=== Ground floor ===
The ground floor is inhabited by all members of society. All members of society evaluate their living conditions in terms of fairness. People will remain on the ground floor as long as they consider their living conditions to be fair. Those who perceive injustice move onto the first floor.

=== First floor ===
On the first floor, people consider their options for improving their situation. People who find options to improve their individual situation and influence decision-makers leave the staircase at this floor in order to pursue non-violent paths. People who are unsatisfied with their available options move onto the second floor.

=== Second floor ===
It is here that feelings of both anger and frustration over not being able to improve the situation instigate a search for a target to blame. This target can either be a direct opponent, such as a government, or a third party to whom aggression is displaced, such as an ethnic or religious group. People who are persuaded that they have an enemy toward whom they can direct their aggression, will proceed to the third floor.

=== Third floor ===
People who arrive here have already developed a readiness towards violence. These feelings can be capitalised on by a violent organisation that is offering a sense of 'moral engagement' to potential recruits. Within these organisations violent actions against a perceived enemy are regarded as acceptable or even as one's duty. Potential recruits are offered a new social identity as members of a selective ingroup who aim to bring justice to the world. People who find this offer appealing will move on to the fourth floor.

=== Fourth floor ===
It is here that thinking such as 'us' versus 'them' is promoted. Recruits are isolated from friends and family, strict secrecy is imposed and the legitimacy of the organisation is emphasised. People who reach this floor will rarely withdraw and exit the staircase alive. They will move onto the fifth floor if an opportunity to do so presents.

=== Fifth floor ===
It is here that the violent act is carried out. In order to be as effective as possible, any inhibition about killing innocent people must be overcome. This is done via two means. Categorisation stresses the differentiation between ingroup and out group, and distancing exaggerates the differences between the ingroup and the perceived enemy.

== Implications ==
Moghaddam states the model is not a formal one, but rather a metaphor for the purpose of providing general framework in order to organise current psychological knowledge regarding terrorism. Nevertheless, the model is cited as useful for conceptualising the process that results in only a small number of individuals from a large group of disgruntled people will commit acts of violence against the innocent. Moghaddam states that it is not enough to simply try and identify and stop potential terrorists, as this will only make room for new people to step forward, and instead proposes that the only way to end terrorism is by reforming the condition on the ground floor so that it is no longer perceived as unjust and hopeless by a large portion of society.

The empirical basis of the model has been evaluated by an article in the Scandinavian Journal of Psychology. The findings state that whilst most of the processes in the model are supported by empirical evidence, the quantity and quality of said evidence varies. Whilst praising Moghaddam's model for emphasising potential mechanisms for future study, the review concludes that the staircase model may not be the right metaphor for summarising the phenomena of terrorism, citing a lack of evidence for transition between the floors, and the possibility that some floors and corresponding processes from the model could be removed entirely due to a lack of empirical evidence.
