= Joggling =

Sport that combines juggling with jogging

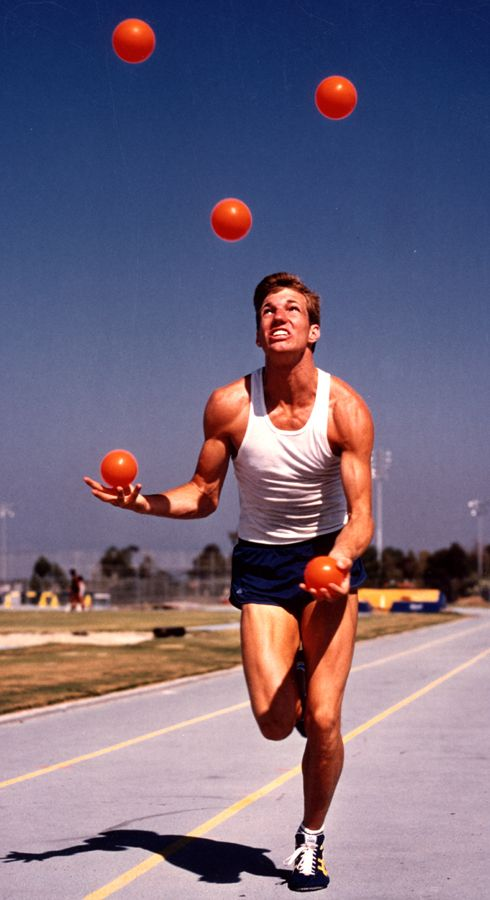
Guinness World Record-holder Owen Morse joggling during a training session at University of California, Irvine, in 1988

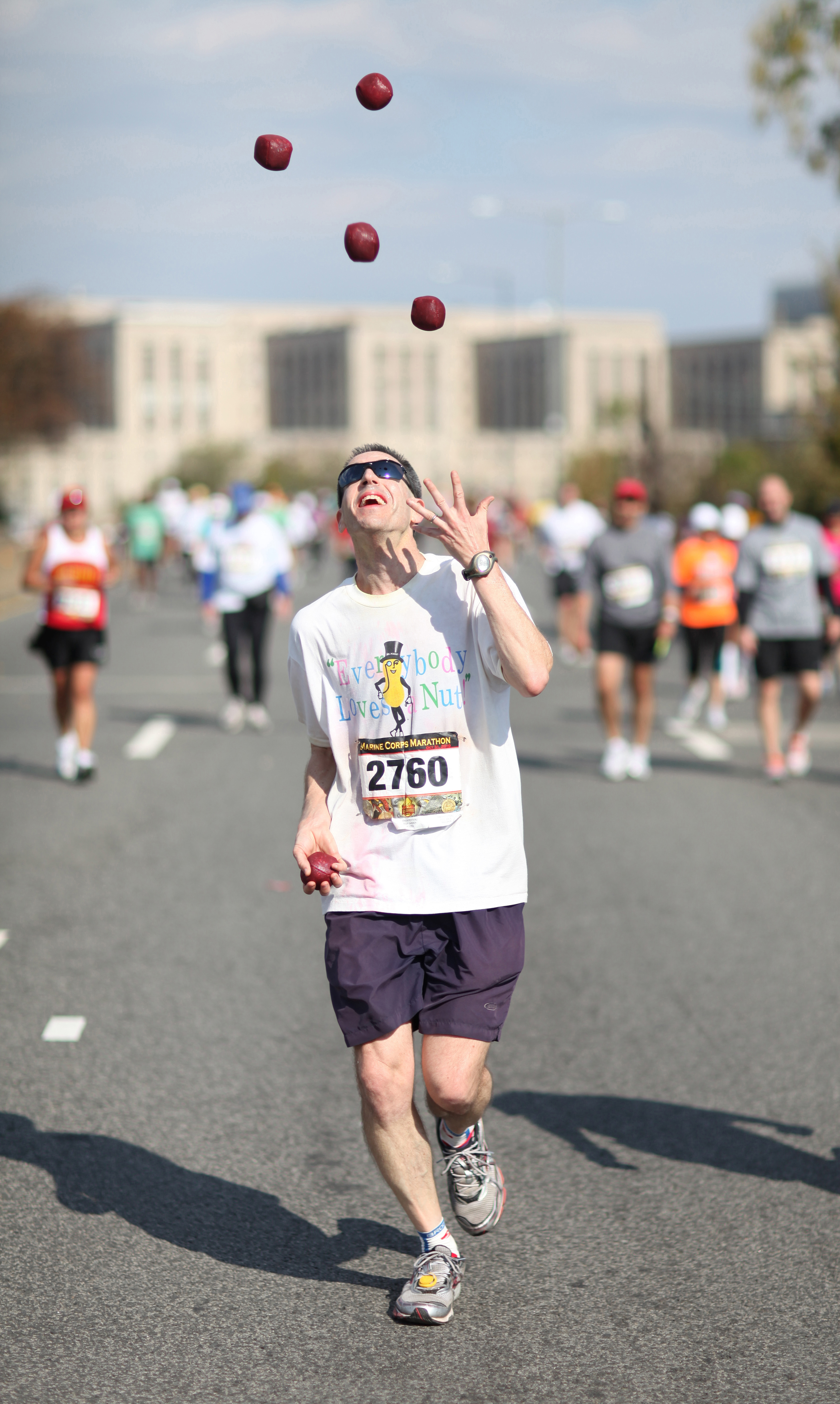
A runner joggles past the 20 mile marker during the 35th Marine Corps Marathon, October 31, 2010

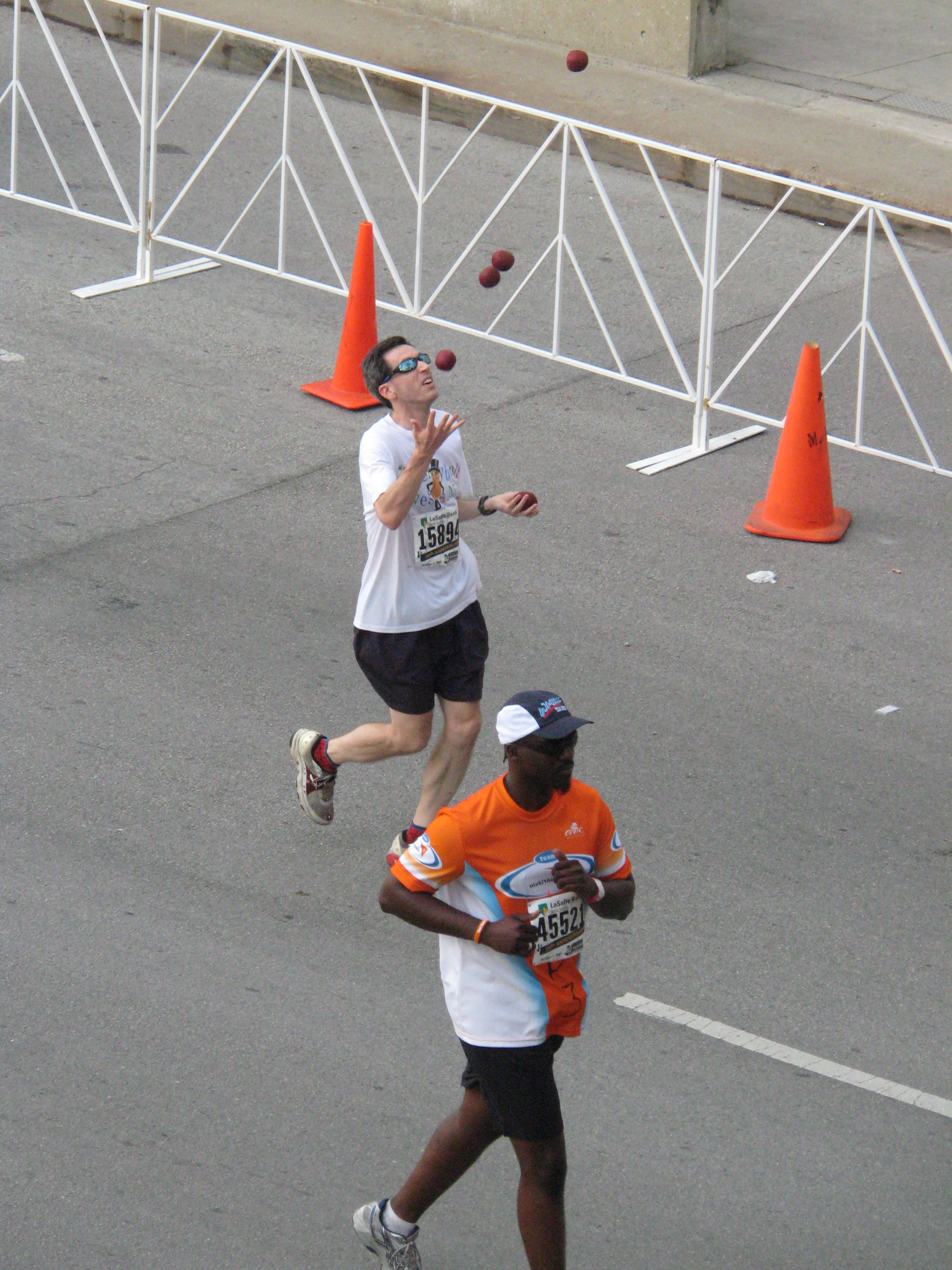
2007 Chicago Marathon

Joggling is a competitive sport that combines juggling with jogging. People who joggle are called jogglers.

The most common objects used in joggling are juggling balls, or sometimes juggling clubs, but any set of three or more objects can be used. In competitions or long term events, however, most jogglers prefer to use palm-size beanbags stuffed with birdseed because they are light enough for long distances but heavy enough to withstand winds. The juggling is usually done in a three-ball cascade pattern, which is efficient and uses the least energy. Jogglers say that the arm motions of juggling with three objects feels natural with the action and pace of jogging.

== Rules ==
The rules that define joggling in competitions and races are:

1. A juggling pattern must be maintained while running.
2. If an object is dropped, the joggler must return to the point they dropped and continue.

== Competition ==
Jogglers compete in races around the world over a range of distances, from their local parkrun events to large city marathons.

The World Joggling Championships are held each year as one of the events of the International Jugglers' Association juggling festival, where results are recorded and medals awarded. Anyone can compete in the World Joggling Championships, but competitors need to be able to juggle three balls proficiently. All registrants must pay an entry fee, which covers any to all of the events entered for one juggler, and complete and sign a liability waiver. Some events require meeting a qualifying standard (e.g. in a former meet, competitors in the 400 meter 5-ball event need to have completed the 100 meter 5-ball event in less than 90 seconds). The meet schedule for the World Joggling Championships most commonly includes races ranging from 100 meters to 1600 meters, with the occasional novel-yet-standardized distance, prop count, or obstacle. Frequently, world record attempts will be held at these meets (e.g. 800m, 5K, and 10K record attempts in the last decade), as well as relay races in which teammates pass one ball to the next relay runner, who holds two in the handoff zone. The schedule also often includes 4-ball, 5-ball, and 7-ball events, which require much greater technical juggling skills as opposed to flat-out speed. Competitions have been virtual through the COVID-19 pandemic, with the intent of incorporating both virtual and in-person event blocks when the health risk diminishes.

The first championships were held in 1980 at the IJA juggling festival in Fargo, North Dakota. They were organized by Bill Giduz, an avid joggler who edited the IJA Newsletter at the time in an attempt to interest others in the activity. Two races were held on that occasion—a 100-yard race across a football field that was won by Brad Heffler in 13.4 seconds, and a one-mile run on an indoor track that was won by Canadian comic entertainer Michel Lauzière, who was late to the start line and ran his race barefoot.

=== 2026 IJA World Joggling Championships ===
The Virtual Championships concluded on July 17, 2026, and the in-person championships took place at the Turnstone Olympic & Paralympic Facility in Fort Wayne, Indiana on July 30, 2026 and a long-distance event on August 1.

Gold Medalists and Top Performances: IJA World Joggling Championships 2026
Event	Props	Division	Athlete(s)	Time	DR	ATR	Comments
3-ball 1000 meters	3	B17	Connor Levitt	4:34.55	#4		Aaron Heilig [S], Caleb Black [B]
3-ball 1000 meters	3	MM	Sterling Franklin	3:43.44	#3	#8	Jack Hirschowitz [S], Tim Heilig [B]
3-ball 1000 meters	3	MO	Sam Dean	2:50.67	#1	#1	New IJA World Record; Erik Breuer [S], Mike Moore [B]
3-ball 1000 meters	3	WO	Ingrid Vukusic	4:03.29	#2		Meggie Exner [S], Marla Edgecomb [B]
3-ball 200 meters	3	B17	Connor Levitt	36.47			Aaron Heilig [S], Arnav Rathi [B]
3-ball 200 meters	3	MM	Sterling Franklin	31.40	#2		Tim Heilig [S], Michael Black [B]
3-ball 200 meters	3	MO	Sam Dean	29.31	#8	#10	Mark Fiore [S], Mike Moore [B]
3-ball 200 meters	3	WM	Jill Edgecomb	1:29.79	#7		
3-ball 200 meters	3	WO	Ingrid Vukusic	37.06	#4		Marla Edgecomb [S], Zoe Prawda [B]
3-ball 60 meters	3	B17	Connor Levitt	9.44	#2	#9	Caleb Black [S], Aaron Heilig [B]
3-ball 60 meters	3	MM	Sterling Franklin	9.48	#2	#9	Tim Heilig [S], Bill Feay [B]
3-ball 60 meters	3	MO	Mark Fiore	8.84	#3	#4	Kanoa Lindiwe [S], Mike Moore [B]
3-ball 60 meters	3	WM	Jill Edgecomb	24.36	#6		
3-ball 60 meters	3	WO	Ingrid Vukusic	10.61	#2		Marla Edgecomb [S], Misha Hlasek [B]
4-ball 800 meters	4	B17	Arnav Rathi	4:11.31	#1	#5	New Division Record; Connor Levitt [S], Aaron Heilig [B]
4-ball 800 meters	4	MM	Sterling Franklin	4:05.09	#1	#4	New Division Record; Tim Heilig [S]
4-ball 800 meters	4	MO	Mark Fiore	3:14.56	#1	#1	New IJA World Record; Sam Dean [S], Mike Moore [B]
4-ball 800 meters	4	WM	Jill Edgecomb	15:14.93	#1		New Division Record
4-ball 800 meters	4	WO	Ingrid Vukusic	5:27.49	#1	#8	New Division Record; Marla Edgecomb [S], Zoe Prawda [B]
5-ball 60 meters	5	B17	Connor Levitt	27.51	#5		Aaron Heilig [S], Caleb Black [B]
5-ball 60 meters	5	MM	Sterling Franklin	31.80	#5		Tim Heilig [S], Michael Black [B]
5-ball 60 meters	5	MO	Mark Fiore	10.53	#2	#2	Mike Moore [S], Kanoa Lindiwe [B]
5-ball 60 meters	5	WM	Jill Edgecomb	2:14.99	#3		
5-ball 60 meters	5	WO	Zoe Prawda	1:56.22	#5		
7-ball 60 meters	7	B17	Connor Levitt	1:35.71	#3	#5	Aaron Heilig [S], Arnav Rathi [B]
7-ball 60 meters	7	MM	Sterling Franklin	11:16.24	#1	#8	New Division Record
7-ball 60 meters	7	MO	Mike Moore	57.67	#2	#4	Mark Fiore [S]
Stacker Relay (3-ball, 4-ball, 5-ball, and 5-ball - 800 meters)		B17	Boys 13-17 Team (Connor Levitt, Aaron Heilig, Caleb Black, Arnav Rathi)	4:15.14	#1	#2	New Division Record
Stacker Relay (3-ball, 4-ball, 5-ball, and 5-ball - 800 meters)		MM	Men's Masters Team (Sterling Franklin, Erik Breuer, Michael Black, Kanoa Lindiwe)	8:17.52	#1	#3	New Division Record
Stacker Relay (3-ball, 4-ball, 5-ball, and 5-ball - 800 meters)		MO	Men's Open Team (Mark Fiore, Mike Moore, Kanoa Lindiwe, Sam Dean)	3:17.11	#1	#1	New IJA World Record
Stacker Relay (3-ball, 4-ball, 4-ball, and 5-ball - 800 meters)		WO	Women's Open Team (Ingrid Vukusic, Zoe Prawda, Misha Hlasek, Savanna Dean)	10:44.80	#1	#4	New Division Record

Gold Medalists and Top Performances: IJA Virtual World Joggling Championships 2026
Event	Props	Division	Athlete(s)	Time	DR	ATR	Comments
3-ball 10000 meters	3	MM	Daniel Raum	45:51.566	#2	#4	
3-ball 10000 meters	3	MO	Samuel Dean	37:29.50	#2	#2	
Sprint Combo (3-ball + 4-ball 100 meters)	3	MM	Sterling Franklin	29.92	#1	#1	Inaugural IJA World Record; Christoph Mitasch [S], Daniel Raum [B]
Sprint Combo (3-ball + 4-ball 100 meters)	3	MO	Scott Jenkins	30.44	#1	#2	Inaugural Division Record; Samuel Dean [S], Craig Muhlenkamp [B]
3-ball 400 meters	3	MM	Sterling Franklin	1:05.92	#2		Daniel Raum [S], Christoph Mitasch [B]
3-ball 400 meters	3	MO	Scott Jenkins	1:01.60	#5	#7	Samuel Dean [S], Andy Widmann [B]
3-ball 400 meters	3	WO	Kaylyn Clerc	4:17.20			
3-ball 5000 meters	3	MM	Christoph Mitasch	20:29.07	#3		Daniel Raum [S]
3-ball Mile	3	MM	Daniel Raum	6:03.83	#2		Christoph Mitasch [S]
3-ball Mile	3	MO	Samuel Dean	5:25.60	#9	#10	Craig Muhlenkamp [S]
3-ball Mile Backwards	3	MM	Daniel Raum	12:40.966	#1	#1	Inaugural IJA World Record
4-ball Mile	4	MM	Sterling Franklin	8:29.72	#1	#2	Inaugural Division Record; Christoph Mitasch [S]
4-ball Mile	4	MO	Samuel Dean	7:22.67	#1	#1	Inaugural IJA World Record
Skill Combo (5-ball + 6-ball + 7-ball 100 meters)	5	MM	Sterling Franklin	13:37.66	#1	#1	Inaugural IJA World Record
5-ball 400 meters	5	MM	Sterling Franklin	5:10.26	#4		
5-ball 400 meters	5	MO	Scott Jenkins	2:21.77	#6	#8	
5-ball Mile	5	MM	Sterling Franklin	24:17.10	#1	#3	New Division Record
7-ball 100 meters	7	MM	Chris Fowler	49.70	#1	#2	New Division Record

Exhibition Performances: IJA Virtual World Joggling Championships 2026
Event	Props	Division	Athlete(s)	Time	DR	ATR	Comments
3-ball 400 meters Backwards	3	MM	Daniel Raum	2:13.300	#2	#2	
3-Shot Put (16 lb) 60 meters	3	MM	Chris Fowler	15.92	#1	#1	Inaugural IJA World Record
3-Shot Put (5 kg) 100 meters	3	MM	Chris Fowler	19.98	#2	#2	

Gold Medalists and Top Performances: IJA World Joggling Championships Distance Event 2026
Event	Props	Division	Athlete(s)	Time	DR	ATR	Comments
3-ball 3 Mile	3	B17	Connor Levitt	28:23.11	#1	#5	New Division Record
3-ball 3 Mile	3	M 40-49	Sterling Franklin	20:43.29	#1	#2	New Division Record
3-ball 3 Mile	3	M 50-59	Nick Frazier	44:23.42	#2	#8	
3-ball 3 Mile	3	M 20-29	Erik Breuer	18:45.91	#1	#1	Inaugural IJA World Record
3-ball 3 Mile	3	WNB 30-39	Ingrid Vukusic	25:06.65	#1	#3	New Division Record
3-ball 3 Mile	3	WNB 30-39	Marla Edgecomb	28:04.84	#2	#4	
3-ball 3 Mile	3	WNB 20-29	Nora Phillips	34:51.42	#3	#6	Lacy Gragg [S]
3-ball 5 Mile	3	B17	Aaron Heilig	43:04.55	#1	#1	Inaugural IJA World Record
3-ball 5 Mile	3	M 50-59	Barak Hirschowitz	44:25.41	#1	#2	New Division Record
3-ball 7 Mile	3	M 20-29	Sam Dean	39:19.81	#1	#1	Inaugural IJA World Record
3-ball 7 Mile	3	WNB 30-39	Meggie Exner	1:02:58.80	#1	#2	New Division Record

Divisions: B12 - Boys 12-and-Under, G12 - Girls 12-and-Under, B17 - Boys 13-to-17, G17 - Girls 13-to-17, MO - Men's Open, WO - Women's Open, MM - Men's Masters, WM - Women's Masters

=== 2025 IJA World Joggling Championships ===
Part of the International Jugglers' Association 78th Annual Festival - Location: Evansville, IN

Deadlines, dates, and locations - Virtual: 7/15, 5K/10K/15K Road Race: 7/16 @ Pigeon Creek Greenway Passage, Track Meet: 7/19 @ Reitz Memorial High School

Note: The first annual European Joggling Championships were also held this year as part of EJC 2025 in Arnhem, the Netherlands.

Gold medalists and top performances: IJA Virtual World Joggling Championships 2025
Event	Props	Division	Athlete(s)	Time	DR	ATR	Comments
3-ball 1500 meters	3	MM	Daniel Raum	5:35.00	#1	#7	Giduz 1500; New Division Record; Christoph Mitasch [S]
3-ball 1500 meters	3	MO	Samuel Dean	4:46.03	#2	#2	Craig Muhlenkamp [S]
3-ball 200 meters	3	MM	Daniel Raum	35.03	#8		Thijs Niesten [S]
3-ball 200 meters	3	MO	Andrew Widmann	34.07			Craig Muhlenkamp [S]
3-ball 200 meters backwards	3	MM	Daniel Raum	56.76	#1	#1	New IJA World Record
3-ball 60 meters	3	MM	Sterling Franklin	8.68	#1	#2	New Division Record
3-ball 60 meters	3	MO	Craig Muhlenkamp	9.33	#4	#5	
3-ball 60 meters backwards	3	MM	Daniel Raum	16.23	#1	#1	New IJA World Record
3-ball 800 meters	3	MM	Daniel Raum	2:45.33	#6		Thijs Niesten [S]
3-ball 800 meters	3	MO	Samuel Dean	2:18.20	#3	#3	Craig Muhlenkamp [S], Andrew Widmann [B]
3-ball 800 meters backwards	3	MM	Daniel Raum	4:33.53	#1	#1	New IJA World Record
3-ball Half Marathon	3	MM	Daniel Raum	1:36:00.60	#1	#2	New Division Record; Christoph Mitasch [S], Sterling Franklin [B]
3-ball Half Marathon	3	MO	Samuel Dean	1:20:42.06	#1	#1	New IJA World Record; Craig Muhlenkamp [S]
3-Baseball Bat 100 meters	3	MM	Chris Fowler	19.00	#1	#1	New IJA World Record
4-ball 200 meters	4	MM	Sterling Franklin	33.80	#2	#2	
4-ball 60 meters	4	MM	Sterling Franklin	9.64	#1	#2	New Division Record
5-ball 60 meters	5	MM	Sterling Franklin	25.78	#3		
6-ball 60 meters	6	MM	Sterling Franklin	57.46	#1	#1	New IJA World Record

Gold medalists and top performances: IJA World Joggling Championships Road Race 2025
Event	Props	Division	Athlete(s)	Time	DR	ATR	Comments
3-ball 10000 meters	3	B 13-19	Easton Smith	43:41.00	#1	#1	New IJA Road Race Record
3-ball 10000 meters	3	M 40-49	Jeff Lutkus	1:02:58.00	#1	#3	New Division Record
3-ball 10000 meters	3	M 30-39	Christian Kloc	58:11.00	#1	#2	New Division Record
3-ball 15000 meters	3	M 20-29	Thomas Whitaker	1:32:51.00	#1	#3	New Division Record
3-ball 15000 meters	3	W 40-49	Katie Burgess	1:28:05.00	#1	#1	New IJA Road Race Record
3-ball 15000 meters	3	W 30-39	Meggie Exner	1:28:06.00	#1	#2	New Division Record
3-ball 5000 meters	3	B 13-19	Aaron Heilig	26:11.00	#5		
3-ball 5000 meters	3	M 40-49	Sterling Franklin	24:22.00	#6		
3-ball 5000 meters	3	M 60-69	Jean-Guy Beaudry	30:28.00			
3-ball 5000 meters	3	M 30-39	Nathan Nard	19:49.15			Mike Moore [S], Nick Leonardi [B]
3-ball 5000 meters	3	W 20-29	Ingrid Vukusic	27:41.00	#5		

Gold medalists and top performances: IJA World Joggling Championships 2025
Event	Props	Division	Athlete(s)	Time	DR	ATR	Comments
3-ball 100 meters	3	B17	Aaron Heilig	18.69			Arnav Rathi [S]
3-ball 100 meters	3	MM	Torrey Hamilton	18.31			Jean-Guy Beaudry [S], Sterling Franklin [B]
3-ball 100 meters	3	MO	Mike Moore	15.64			Nathan Nard [S], James Francis [B]
3-ball 100 meters	3	WM	Kelly Macklin	41.16	#10		
3-ball 100 meters	3	WO	Kayla Malmgren	17.98	#8		Ingrid Vukusic [S], Zoe Prawda [B]
3-ball 3200 meter relay (4x800)	3	MO	Men's Open (Mark Fiore, Jacob Cowan, Nathan Nard, Samuel Dean)	10:29.75	#1	#1	New IJA World Record
3-ball 3200 meter relay (4x800)	3	MX	Boys & Geezers (Aaron Heilig, Arnav Rathi, Jean-Guy Beaudry, Sterling Franklin)	14:16.12	#1	#2	New Division Record
3-ball 3200 meter relay (4x800)	3	WX	Women's Mixed (Kayla Malmgren, Zoe Prawda, Ingrid Vukusic, Kelly Macklin)	22:00.25	#1	#3	New Division Record
3-ball 400 meter relay (4x100)	3	MO	Men's Open (Mark Fiore, Jacob Cowan, Nathan Nard, Samuel Dean)	1:19.62			
3-ball 400 meter relay (4x100)	3	MX	Boys & Geezers (Aaron Heilig, Jean-Guy Beaudry, Tim Heilig, Sterling Franklin)	1:31.80	#2		
3-ball 400 meter relay (4x100)	3	WX	Women's Mixed (Kayla Malmgren, Zoe Prawda, Ingrid Vukusic, Kelly Macklin)	1:47.85	#1		New Division Record
3-ball 400 meters	3	B17	Arnav Rathi	1:22.41			Aaron Heilig [S]
3-ball 400 meters	3	MM	Sterling Franklin	1:10.15	#3		Torrey Hamilton [S], Jean-Guy Beaudry [B]
3-ball 400 meters	3	MO	Samuel Dean	1:03.89			Nathan Nard [S], Jacob Cowan [B]
3-ball 400 meters	3	WO	Ingrid Vukusic	1:32.21			Kayla Malmgren [S], Zoe Prawda [B]
3-ball 50 meters	3	WM	Miz Tilly	28.00	#1	#1	Miz Tilly 50m Spectacular
3-ball Mile	3	B17	Arnav Rathi	7:06.67	#6		Aaron Heilig [S]
3-ball Mile	3	MM	Sterling Franklin	6:35.25	#4		Torrey Hamilton [S], Jean-Guy Beaudry [B]
3-ball Mile	3	MO	Samuel Dean	4:57.01	#3	#3	Nathan Nard [S], Jacob Cowan [B]
3-ball Mile	3	WO	Ingrid Vukusic	8:10.89	#7		Zoe Prawda [S]
4-ball 100 meters	4	B17	Aaron Heilig	21.57	#1	#10	New Division Record; Arnav Rathi [S]
4-ball 100 meters	4	MM	Sterling Franklin	17.50	#2	#5	Justin Sheldon [S], Jonathan Root [B]
4-ball 100 meters	4	MO	Mark Fiore	14.71	#2	#2	Mike Moore [S], Tony Gonzalez [B]
4-ball 100 meters	4	WO	Kayla Malmgren	31.92	#1		New Division Record; Ingrid Vukusic [S], Zoe Prawda [B]
5-ball 100 meters	5	B17	Aaron Heilig	1:33.27			Arnav Rathi [S]
5-ball 100 meters	5	MM	Sterling Franklin	1:03.07	#9		Justin Sheldon [S], Jean-Guy Beaudry [B]
5-ball 100 meters	5	MO	Mark Fiore	22.70			Mike Moore [S], Jacob Cowan [B]
5-ball 100 meters	5	WO	Kayla Malmgren	50.36	#2		Zoe Prawda [S]
5-ball 400 meters	5	B17	Aaron Heilig	5:53.37			Arnav Rathi [S]
5-ball 400 meters	5	MM	Sterling Franklin	4:25.11	#4		
5-ball 400 meters	5	MO	Mark Fiore	1:33.11	#2	#2	Mike Moore [S], Jacob Cowan [B]
5-ball 400 meters	5	WO	Kayla Malmgren	5:22.36	#1		New Division Record

Divisions: B12 - Boys 12-and-Under, G12 - Girls 12-and-Under, B17 - Boys 13-to-17, G17 - Girls 13-to-17, MO - Men's Open, WO - Women's Open, MM - Men's Masters, WM - Women's Masters

=== 2024 World Joggling Championships ===
The 2024 Championships included both In-Person and Virtual Championships again, the Virtual Championships stretching from Fall 2023 through June 2024, and the In-Person Championship Meet taking place in Green Bay, Wisconsin on July 11, as part of the IJA 77th Annual Festival. Additionally, a 5K Road Race was run along the Fox River Trail in Green Bay on July 13.

International Jugglers' Association 77th Annual Festival

Gold medalists and top performances: IJA World Joggling Championships 2024
Event	Props	Division	Athlete(s)	Time	DR	ATR	Comments
3-ball 1500 meters	3	B17	Aaron Heilig	9:41.04	#1		Giduz 1500; New Division Record
3-ball 1500 meters	3	MM	Sterling Franklin	5:38.95	#1	#7	Giduz 1500; New Division Record; Erik Raivo [S], Barak Hirschowitz [B]
3-ball 1500 meters	3	MO	Sam Dean	4:40.23	#1	#1	Giduz 1500; New IJA World Record; Jonathan Abbott [S], Nathan Nard [B]
3-ball 1500 meters	3	WO	Zoe Prawda	11:02.61	#1		Giduz 1500; New Division Record
3-ball 200 meters	3	B17	Aaron Heilig	49.87			
3-ball 200 meters	3	MM	Sterling Franklin	30.38	#2		Erik Raivo [S], Jack Hirschowitz [B]
3-ball 200 meters	3	MO	Mark Fiore	28.46	#5	#6	Sam Dean [S], Jacob Heimer [B]
3-ball 200 meters	3	WO	Zoe Prawda	50.59			
3-ball 60 meters	3	B17	Aaron Heilig	15.57	#10		
3-ball 60 meters	3	MM	Sterling Franklin	8.78	#1	#2	New Division Record; Justin Sheldon [S], Erik Raivo [B]
3-ball 60 meters	3	MO	Mark Fiore	8.41	#2	#2	Draco Tong [S], Jacob Heimer [B]
3-ball 60 meters	3	WM	Heather Marriott	13.21	#2		Laura Shub [S]
3-ball 60 meters	3	WO	Delaney Bayles	12.45	#4		Zoe Prawda [S], Kaylin Meyers [B]
3-ball 800 meter relay (4x200)	3	CO	Team 12345 (Jonathan Abbott, Erik Raivo, Aaron Heilig, Zoe Prawda)	2:56.41	#1	#9	New Division Record
3-ball 800 meter relay (4x200)	3	MM	Team Aged Cheddar (Mikey Free, Barak Hirschowitz, Jack Hirschowitz, Sterling Franklin)	3:02.73	#3		
3-ball 800 meter relay (4x200)	3	MO	Team Exerbags (Jacob Heimer, Nathan Nard, Sam Dean, Mark Fiore)	2:07.32	#1	#1	New IJA World Record
3-ball 800 meters	3	B17	Aaron Heilig	4:09.67			
3-ball 800 meters	3	MM	Sterling Franklin	2:37.45	#3		Erik Raivo [S], Torrey Hamilton [B]
3-ball 800 meters	3	MO	Sam Dean	2:19.20	#4	#4	Jonathan Abbott [S], Nathan Nard [B]
3-ball 800 meters	3	WM	Heather Marriott	4:03.33	#2		
3-ball 800 meters	3	WO	Zoe Prawda	4:48.03			
3-basketball 100 meter Drubbling	3	B17	Aaron Heilig	2:43	#1	#5	McLincha 100 New Division Record
3-basketball 100 meter Drubbling	3	MM	Erik Raivo	45.87	#1	#1	McLincha 100; New IJA World Record; Sterling Franklin [S]
3-basketball 100 meter Drubbling	3	MO	Draco Tong	1:16.17	#1	#2	McLincha 100; New Division Record
3-basketball 100 meter Drubbling	3	WO	Zoe Prawda	2:25.29	#1	#4	McLincha 100; New Division Record
4-ball 60 meters	4	B17	Aaron Heilig	29.77	#1	#7	New Division Record
4-ball 60 meters	4	MM	Sterling Franklin	14.49	#1	#2	New Division Record; Erik Raivo [S], Justin Sheldon [B]
4-ball 60 meters	4	MO	Mark Fiore	8.74	#1	#1	New IJA World Record; Kanoa Lindiwe [S], Draco Tong [B]
4-ball 60 meters	4	WO	Zoe Prawda	32.48	#1	#8	New Division Record
5-ball 200 meters	5	B17	Aaron Heilig	4:51.27	#4		
5-ball 200 meters	5	MM	Sterling Franklin	2:03.30	#4		Erik Raivo [S], Justin Sheldon [B]
5-ball 200 meters	5	MO	Mark Fiore	1:24.63	#4	#7	Kanoa Lindiwe [S], Draco Tong [B]
5-ball 200 meters	5	WO	Delaney Bayles	1:53.49	#1		New Division Record
5-ball 60 meters	5	B17	Aaron Heilig	1:03.78	#5		
5-ball 60 meters	5	MM	Justin Sheldon	31.80	#5		Erik Raivo [S], Sterling Franklin [B]
5-ball 60 meters	5	MO	Kanoa Lindiwe	29.15	#6		Mark Fiore [S], Draco Tong [B]
5-ball 60 meters	5	WO	Delaney Bayles	32.89	#2		Zoe Prawda [S]

Gold medalists and top performances: IJA World Joggling Championships Road Race 2024 (Fox River Trail 5K)
Event	Props	Division	Athlete(s)	Time	DR	ATR	Comments
3-ball 5000 meters	3	MO	Draco Tong	29:23.00			
3-ball 5000 meters	3	MM	Sterling Franklin	20:04.00	#1		New Men's Masters Record; Torrey Hamilton [S], Erik Raivo [B]
3-ball 5000 meters	3	M 50-59	Barak Hirschowitz	24:57.00			
3-ball 5000 meters	3	M 70-79	Jack Hirschowitz	29:58.00			
3-ball 5000 meters	3	WO	Meggie Mariah	25:56.00	#5		
3-ball 5000 meters	3	WM	Katie Burgess	27:28.00	#3		

Gold medalists and top performances: IJA Virtual World Joggling Championships 2024
Event	Props	Division	Athlete(s)	Time	DR	ATR	Comments
3-ball 100 meters	3	MM	Sterling Franklin	13.90	#1		New Division Record; Daniel Raum [S]
3-ball 100 meters	3	MO	Samuel Dean	15.90			
3-ball 100 meters	3	WO	Kaylyn Schull	23.77			
3-ball 100 meters Backwards	3	MM	Daniel Raum	26.44	#2	#6	
3-ball 10000 meters	3	MM	Daniel Raum	42:28.96	#1	#3	New Division Record
3-ball 10000 meters	3	MO	Samuel Dean	38:01.90	#2	#2	
3-ball 400 meters	3	MM	Sterling Franklin	1:03.88	#1		New Division Record; Daniel Raum [S]
3-ball 400 meters	3	MO	Samuel Dean	1:10.10			
3-ball 400 meters	3	WO	Kaylyn Schull	1:54.34			
3-ball 400 meters Backwards	3	MM	Daniel Raum	2:01.64	#1	#1	New IJA World Record
3-ball 5000 meters	3	MM	Christoph Mitasch	20:45.60	#2		Daniel Raum [S]
3-ball Mile	3	MM	Daniel Raum	5:51.70	#1		New Division Record
3-ball Mile	3	MO	Samuel Dean	5:02.31	#3	#3	
3-ball Mile	3	WO	Kaylyn Schull	9:35.00			
4-ball 100 meters	4	MM	Sterling Franklin	14.84	#1	#2	New Division Record
4-ball 100 meters	4	WO	Kaylyn Schull	1:48.57	#2		
4-ball 200 meters	4	MM	Sterling Franklin	32.70	#1	#1	New IJA World Record
4-ball 400 meters	4	MM	Sterling Franklin	1:23.56	#1	#1	New IJA World Record
6-ball 100 meters	6	MM	Sterling Franklin	1:26.88	#1	#1	New IJA World Record

Divisions: B17 - Boys 13-to-17, G17 - Girls 13-to-17, MO - Men's Open, CO - Coed Open, WO - Women's Open, MM - Men's Masters, WM - Women's Masters

=== 2023 World Joggling Championships ===
2023 marked the first year that IJA held both in-person as well as virtual championships. The In-Person Championship Meet took place at Leighton Stadium in South Bend, Indiana, USA on July 22, as part of the IJA Annual Festival, and the Virtual Championships had a submission deadline on August 22.

International Jugglers' Association 76th Annual Festival

Gold medalists and top performances: IJA World Joggling Championships 2023 (In-Person Meet)
Event	Props	Division	Athlete(s)	Time	DR	ATR	Comments
3-ball 100 meters	3	B12	Caleb Black	18.14	#4		
3-ball 100 meters	3	B17	Torsten Hornemann	21.16			James Auriemma [S]
3-ball 100 meters	3	G17	Sarah Kresser	38.75			
3-ball 100 meters	3	MM	Sterling Franklin	14.37	#1		New Division Record; Aaron Rosenberg [S], Jack Hirschowitz [B]
3-ball 100 meters	3	MO	Jared Janssen	14.41			Draco Tong [S], Jacob Heimer [B]
3-ball 100 meters	3	WM	Heather Marriott	21.09	#3		JoAnn Ireland [S], Becky Kresser [B]
3-ball 100 meters	3	WO	Kaylin Meyers	18.76			Kaylyn Schull [S]
3-ball 1600 meter relay (4x400)	3	MM	James Auriemma, Barak Hirschowitz, Jack Hirschowitz, Sterling Franklin	6:19.28	#4		
3-ball 1600 meter relay (4x400)	3	MO	Jacob Heimer, Torsten Hornemann, Harry Rosenberg, Nathan Nard	5:27.67			
3-ball 1600 meter relay (4x400)	3	WO	Kaylyn Schull, Kaylin Meyers, Summer Cooper, JoAnn Ireland	7:08.34	#5		
3-ball 400 meter relay (4x100)	3	MO	Caleb Black, Rain Pierce, Mark Fiore, Sterling Franklin	1:19.04			
3-ball 400 meter relay (4x100)	3	WO	Summer Cooper, Kaylyn Schull, Kaylin Meyers, Heather Marriott	1:23.33	#2		
3-ball 400 meters	3	B12	Caleb Black	1:38.88	#5		
3-ball 400 meters	3	B17	Torsten Hornemann	1:16.74			James Auriemma [S]
3-ball 400 meters	3	G17	Sarah Kresser	2:43.70			
3-ball 400 meters	3	MM	Sterling Franklin	1:12.72	#4		Aaron Rosenberg [S], Barak Hirschowitz [B]
3-ball 400 meters	3	MO	Nathan Nard, Jared Janssen	1:11.38			Jacob Heimer [S], Draco Tong [B]
3-ball 400 meters	3	WM	Heather Marriott	1:43.05	#3		JoAnn Ireland [S]
3-ball 400 meters	3	WO	Summer Cooper	1:33.85			Kaylyn Schull [S], Kaylin Meyers [B]
3-ball 40-yard dash	3	B12	Caleb Black	6.93	#1	#3	New Division Record
3-ball 40-yard dash	3	MM	Sterling Franklin	5.04	#1	#1	New IJA World Record
3-ball 40-yard dash	3	MO	Mark Fiore	5.73	#1	#2	New Division Record
3-ball 40-yard dash	3	WO	Kaylin Meyers	7.23	#1	#4	New Division Record
3-ball 800 meters	3	B12	Caleb Black	4:50.98			
3-ball 800 meters	3	B17	Torsten Hornemann	3:00.24			James Auriemma [S]
3-ball 800 meters	3	MM	Sterling Franklin	2:35.22	#3	#10	Barak Hirschowitz [S], Jack Hirschowitz [B]
3-ball 800 meters	3	MO	Nathan Nard	2:38.18			Mark Fiore [S], Jacob Heimer [B]
3-ball 800 meters	3	WM	Heather Marriott	3:49.35	#1		New Division Record; JoAnn Ireland [S]
3-ball 800 meters	3	WO	Summer Cooper	3:20.96	#5		Kaylyn Schull [S]
4-ball 100 meters	4	B12	Caleb Black	19.80	#1	#6	New Division Record
4-ball 100 meters	4	B17	James Auriemma	28.03	#1	#10	New Division Record; Torsten Hornemann [S]
4-ball 100 meters	4	MM	Sterling Franklin	18.46	#2	#5	
4-ball 100 meters	4	MO	Mark Fiore	13.97	#1	#1	New IJA World Record; Jared Janssen [S], Draco Tong [B]
4-ball 100 meters	4	WM	JoAnn Ireland	30.99	#1		New Division Record; Heather Marriott [S], Becky Kresser [B]
4-ball 100 meters	4	WO	Kaylin Meyers	1:20.41	#1		New Division Record; Kaylyn Schull [S]
5-ball 100 meters	5	B12	Caleb Black	1:01.45	#9		
5-ball 100 meters	5	MM	Sterling Franklin	44.99	#6		
5-ball 100 meters	5	MO	Mark Fiore	14.63	#2	#2	New IJA In-Event Record; Jared Janssen [S], Draco Tong [B]
5-ball 100 meters	5	WM	Heather Marriott	1:01.39	#1		New Division Record; JoAnn Ireland [S]

Gold medalists and top performances: IJA Virtual World Joggling Championships 2023
Event	Props	Division	Athlete(s)	Time	DR	ATR	Comments
3-ball 1000 meters	3	B17	Brady Xue	3:46.73	#1	#7	New Division Record
3-ball 1000 meters	3	MM	Sterling Franklin	3:16.50	#1	#2	New Division Record; Daniel Raum [S], Christoph Mitasch [B]
3-ball 1000 meters	3	MO	Samuel Dean	2:59.33	#1	#1	New IJA World Record
3-ball 1000 meters	3	WM	JoAnn Ireland	7:23.05	#3		
3-ball 1000 meters	3	WO	Kaylyn Schull	5:36.30	#2		
3-ball 1600 meters	3	B17	Brady Xue	5:38.93	#3	#10	
3-ball 1600 meters	3	MM	Sterling Franklin	5:31.48	#1	#6	New Division Record; Daniel Raum [S], Christoph Mitasch [B]
3-ball 1600 meters	3	MO	Caleb Williams	4:35.33	#1	#1	New IJA World Record; Samuel Dean [S], Andy Widmann [B]
3-ball 1600 meters	3	WM	JoAnn Ireland	12:59.10	#4		
3-ball 1600 meters	3	WO	Kaylyn Schull	9:11.84			
3-ball 200 meters	3	B17	Brady Xue	35.33			
3-ball 200 meters	3	MM	Sterling Franklin	29.44	#1	#9	New Division Record; Daniel Raum [S], Christoph Mitasch [B]
3-ball 200 meters	3	MO	Samuel Dean	30.87			Andy Widmann [S]
3-ball 200 meters	3	WM	JoAnn Ireland	52.10	#3		
3-ball 500 meters	3	B17	Brady Xue	1:38.90	#1	#3	New Division Record
3-ball 500 meters	3	MM	Sterling Franklin	1:25.80	#1	#2	New Division Record; Daniel Raum [S], Christoph Mitasch [B]
3-ball 500 meters	3	MO	Samuel Dean	1:23.57	#1	#1	New IJA World Record; Andy Widmann [S]
3-ball 500 meters	3	WM	JoAnn Ireland	3:05.65	#1	#8	New Division Record
3-ball 500 meters	3	WO	Kaylyn Schull	2:29.37	#1	#7	New Division Record
3-ball 5000 meters	3	B17	Brady Xue	20:25.00	#3		
3-ball 5000 meters	3	MM	Daniel Raum	20:18.44	#1		New Division Record; Christoph Mitasch [S], Sterling Franklin [B]
3-ball 5000 meters	3	MO	Samuel Dean	18:02.83	#6	#6	
3-ball 5000 meters	3	WM	JoAnn Ireland	39:23.37	#3		

Ranking extra event performances (non-medaling)
Event	Props	Division	Athlete(s)	Time	DR	ATR	Comments
3-ball mile	3	MO	Caleb Williams	4:36.78	#1	#1	New IJA World Record
4-ball 200 meters	4	MM	Sterling Franklin	33.94	#1	#2	New Division Record
5-ball 200 meters	5	MM	Sterling Franklin	1:39.36	#3		
7-ball 100 meters	7	MO	Chris Fowler	45.24	#2	#2	

Divisions: B12 – Boys 12-and-Under, G12 – Girls 12-and-Under, B17 – Boys 13-to-17, G17 – Girls 13-to-17, MO – Men's Open, WO – Women's Open, MM – Men's Masters, WM – Women's Masters

=== 2022 World Joggling Championships ===
In 2022 only Virtual Champinship was held, while In-Person World Championships were delayed for 2023.

International Jugglers' Association 75th Festival

Full Results from Block A and Block B:

Men's gold medalists and top performances
Event	Props	Division	Athlete(s)	Time	DR	ATR	Comments
100 meter 3-ball	3	B17	James Auriemma	19.13			
100 meter 3-ball	3	MO	Sterling Franklin	14.22			Christoph Mitasch [S]
100 meter 3-ball	3	MM	Michal Kapral	15.83			Len Ferman [S]
200 meter 3-ball	3	B12	Quest Crothers	37.67	#1		New Division Record
200 meter 3-ball	3	MO	Sterling Franklin	29.96	#10		Giovanni Gaole [S-Tie], Daniel Raum [S-Tie]
200 meter 3-ball	3	MM	Michal Kapral	31.81	#2		
400 meter 3-ball	3	B17	James Auriemma	1:26.00			
400 meter 3-ball	3	MO	Sterling Franklin	1:06.26			Christoph Mitasch [S], Daniel Raum [B]
800 meter 3-ball	3	B12	Quest Crothers	3:20.30	#1		New Division Record
800 meter 3-ball	3	B17	Brady Xue	2:50.62	#10		James Auriemma [S]
800 meter 3-ball	3	MO	Sterling Franklin	2:34.00	#10		Daniel Raum [S], Christoph Mitasch [B]
800 meter 3-ball	3	MM	Michal Kapral	2:31.30	#3		
1600m 3-ball	3	MO	Sterling Franklin	5:41.48			Daniel Raum [S], Christoph Mitasch [B]
1600m 3-ball	3	MM	Koutaro Kawano	6:38.60			
10K 3-ball	3	MO	Michael Lucien-Bergeron	34:47.00	#1	#1	New IJA World Record
100 meter 4-ball	4	B17	James Auriemma	33.20	#1	#10	New Division Record
100 meter 4-ball	4	MO	Sterling Franklin	15.10	#1	#1	New IJA World Record; Christoph Mitasch [S], Giovanni Gaole [B]
100 meter 4-ball	4	MM	Michal Kapral	16.25	#1	#4	New Division Record
400 meter 4-ball	4	MO	Sterling Franklin	1:31.20	#1	#1	New IJA World Record; Christoph Mitasch [S, #2 ATR]
400 meter 4-ball	4	MM	Michal Kapral	1:54.30	#1	#4	New Division Record
100 meter 5-ball	5	MO	Christoph Mitasch	34.23			Sterling Franklin [S]
100 meter 5-ball	5	MM	Michal Kapral	23.17	#3		
200 meter 5-ball	5	MO	Christoph Mitasch	1:16.83	#1	#3	New Division Record; Sterling Franklin [S, #3 DR]
100 meter 7-ball	7	MO	Chris Fowler	41.83	#1	#1	New IJA World Record; Giovanni Gaole [S, #4 DR], Sterling Franklin [B]
Backwards 100 meter 3-ball	BW 3	MO	Daniel Raum	26.28	#2	#5	Sterling Franklin [S, #3 DR], Chris Fowler [B, #4 DR]
Backwards 100 meter 3-ball	BW 3	MM	Michal Kapral	23.20	#1	#3	New Division Record

Divisions: B12 – Boys 12-and-Under, B17 – Boys 13-to-17, MO – Men's Open, MM – Men's Masters

Women's gold medalists and top performances
Event	Props	Division	Athlete(s)	Time	DR	ATR	Comments
100 meter 3-ball	3	WO	Logan Pearce	19.43			Kaylin Meyers [S]
100 meter 3-ball	3	WM	JoAnn Ireland	22.17	#5		
200 meter 3-ball	3	WO	Skye Jerpbak	42.00	#6		Logan Pearce [S, #8 DR], Kaylyn Schull [B]
400 meter 3-ball	3	WO	Kaylyn Schull	2:53.35			
400 meter 3-ball	3	WM	JoAnn Ireland	2:24.37			
800 meter 3-ball	3	WO	Kaylyn Schull	4:46.57			
1600m 3-ball	3	WO	Kaylyn Schull	10:56.29			
1600m 3-ball	3	WM	JoAnn Ireland	11:59.00	#6		
400 meter 4-ball	4	WM	JoAnn Ireland	3:33.00	#1	#5	New Division Record
100 meter 5-ball	5	WM	JoAnn Ireland	1:27.43	#4		
Backwards 100 meter 3-ball	BW 3	WO	Skye Jerpbak	25.85	#1	#4	New Division Record; Logan Pearce [S]

Divisions: G17 – Girls 17-and-Under, WO – Women's Open, WM – Women's Masters

Ranking extra events (non-medaling)
Event	Props	Division	Athlete(s)	Time	DR	ATR	Comments
600 meter 3-ball	3	MO	Daniel Raum	1:55.32	#5	#5	
800 meter 4-ball	4	MO	Sterling Franklin	3:39.98	#1	#1	IJA Inaugural Record
100 meter 6-ball	6	MO	Sterling Franklin	1:28.65	#1	#1	IJA Inaugural Record
Backwards 100 meter 5-ball	BW 5	MO	Chris Fowler	53.60	#2	#2	Sterling Franklin [#3 ATR]

=== 2021 World Joggling Championships ===
In 2021, only Virtual Championship was held due to the ongoing COVID-19 pandemic, starting on July 15.

International Jugglers' Association Festival (Online/Virtual)

Men's gold medalists and top performances
Event	Props	Division	Athlete(s)	Time	DR	ATR	Comments
100 meter 3-ball	3	B12	Valentin Bolognini	21.00			
100 meter 3-ball	3	MO	Sterling Franklin	14.10			Stephan Cipra [S], Matthew Feldman [B]
200 meter 3-ball	3	B17	David Pavlove Cunsolo	35.37			
200 meter 3-ball	3	MO	Sterling Franklin	29.14	#8	#8	Stephan Cipra [S], Matthew Feldman [B]
200 meter 3-ball	3	MM	Len Ferman	35.10			
400 meter 3-ball	3	B17	James Auriemma	1:32.70			
400 meter 3-ball	3	MO	Sterling Franklin	63.86			Stephan Cipra [S], Matthew Feldman [B]
600 meter 3-ball	3	MO	Sterling Franklin	1:42.96	#1	#1	New World Record
800 meter 3-ball	3	B17	James Auriemma	4:05.20			
800 meter 3-ball	3	MO	Caleb Williams	2:10.95	#1	#1	Sterling Franklin [S, #7 ATR], Stephan Cipra [B]
1600m 3-ball	3	MO	Sterling Franklin	5:25.60			Daniel Raum [S], Christoph Mitasch [B]
1600m 3-ball	3	MM	Koutaro Kawano	6:17.00			
3200m 3-ball	3	B17	Nicholas Boffa	12:44.70	#1	#3	
3200m 3-ball	3	MO	John Baker	11:33.17	#1	#1	IJA Inaugural Record; Christoph Mitasch [S, #2 ATR], Sterling Franklin [B #4, ATR, Tie], Matthew Feldman [B, #4 ATR, Tie]
3200m 3-ball	3	MM	Koutaro Kawano	13:57.00	#1	#6	
100 meter 4-ball	4	B12	Valentin Bolognini	31.40	#1	#5	
100 meter 4-ball	4	MO	Stephan Cipra	15.44	#1	#1	New World Record; Christoph Mitasch [S, #3 ATR], Chris Fowler [B, #4 ATR]
200 meter 4-ball	4	B12	Valentin Bolognini	1:49.50	#1	#5	
200 meter 4-ball	4	B17	David Pavlove Cunsolo	1:49.50	#1	#4	
200 meter 4-ball	4	MO	Stephan Cipra	33.50	#1	#1	New World Record; Sterling Franklin [S, #2 ATR], Matthew Feldman [B, #3 ATR]
100 meter 5-ball	5	MO	Mark Fiore	14.37			New IJA Record; Matthew Feldman [S, #2 ATR], Stephan Cipra [B, #4 ATR], Joel Hilchey [#8 ATR]
200 meter 5-ball	5	B17	David Pavlove Cunsolo	1:05.13	#1	#3	
200 meter 5-ball	5	MO	Matthew Feldman	37.67	#1	#1	New World Record; Stephan Cipra [S, #2 ATR], Christoph Mitasch [B, #4 ATR]
800 meter 5-ball	5	B17	David Pavlove Cunsolo	7:55.43	#1	#1	IJA Inaugural Record
100 meter 7-ball	7	MO	Chris Fowler	52.71	#1	#1	New IJA Record
200 meter 7-ball	7	B17	David Pavlove Cunsolo	3:33.70	#1	#1	IJA Inaugural Record

Divisions: B12 – Boys 12-and-Under, B17 – Boys 13-to-17, MO – Men's Open, MM – Men's Masters

Women's gold medalists and top performances
Event	Props	Division	Athlete(s)	Time	DR	ATR	Comments
100 meter 3-ball	3	WM	JoAnn Ireland	21.90	#5		
200 meter 3-ball	3	WO	Logan Pearce	46.70			Kaylyn Schull [S]
400 meter 3-ball	3	WM	JoAnn Ireland	2:21.50			
800 meter 3-ball	3	WO	Kaylyn Schull	4:27.48			
800 meter 3-ball	3	WM	JoAnn Ireland	4:58.88	#4		
1600 meter 3-ball	3	WM	JoAnn Ireland	11:02.00	#9		
3200 meter 3-ball	3	WM	JoAnn Ireland	23:52.65	#1	#1	IJA Inaugural Record
100 meter 5-ball	5	WM	JoAnn Ireland	1:08.03	#2		

Divisions: G17 – Girls 17-and-Under, WO – Women's Open, WM – Women's Masters

Time attack division results
Event	Props	Division	Athlete(s)	Time	DR	ATR	Comments
200 meter 3-ball	3	WM	JoAnn Ireland	Gold			
3200 meter 3-ball	3	MO	Daniel Raum	Silver			

Time Attack Division: Entries were redone due to footage discrepancies and capped at initial time submission

=== 2020 World Joggling Championships ===
In 2020, only Virtual Championship was held due to the ongoing COVID-19 pandemic, starting on July 18.

International Jugglers' Association 74th Festival (Online/Virtual)

Men's gold Medalists and top performances
Event	Props	Division	Athlete(s)	Time	DR	ATR	Comments
100 meter 3-ball	3	B12	Joshua Black	19.42			Caleb Black [S]
100 meter 3-ball	3	B17	David Pavlove Cunsolo	16.50			
100 meter 3-ball	3	MO	Sterling Franklin	13.96			Craig Muhlenkamp [S], Christoph Mitasch [B]
100 meter 3-Shot Put	3	MO	Chris Fowler	15.96	#1	#1	New World Record, Requirement: Shot Puts 5 kg/11 lb each
200 meter 3-ball	3	MO	Sterling Franklin	29.12	#6	#8	
400 meter 3-ball	3	B12	Joshua Black	2:05			Caleb Black [S]
400 meter 3-ball	3	MO	Sterling Franklin	62.40	#5	#7	Craig Muhlenkamp [S], Christoph Mitasch [B]
400 meter 3-ball	3	MM	Len Ferman	1:17			
600 meter 3-ball	3	MO	Sterling Franklin	1:44.90	#1	#1	New World Record
800 meter 3-ball	3	B12	Caleb Black	8:45			
800 meter 3-ball	3	MO	Henry Wellenstein	2:19.14	#2	#2	Sterling Franklin [S, #4 ATR], Craig Muhlenkamp [B, Tie], Christoph Mitasch [B, Tie] (Note: Honorable mention: Aaron Scott recorded 2:35.41 in a verifiable fun-run video submission, ranking third among competitive performances.)
1 Mile 3-ball	3	B12	Caleb Black	19:47			
1 Mile 3-ball	3	MO	Sterling Franklin	5:29.97	#8	#8	Full Mile time reported; ranks based on conversion down to 1600m; Craig Muhlenkamp [S]
3K 3-ball	3	MO	Sterling Franklin	11:10.9	#1	#1	IJA Inaugural Record
5K 3-ball	3	MO	Michael-Lucien Bergeron	16:49.67	#1	#1	New World Record, Sterling Franklin [S], Christoph Mitasch [B]
100 meter 4-ball	4	MO	Sterling Franklin	15.78	#1	#1	IJA Inaugural Record
200 meter 4-ball	4	MO	Sterling Franklin	40.47	#1	#1	IJA Inaugural Record
400 meter 4-ball	4	MO	Sterling Franklin	1:49.36	#1	#1	IJA Inaugural Record
100 meter 5-ball	5	B12	Joshua Black	2:11			Caleb Black [S]
100 meter 5-ball	5	B17	David Pavlove Cunsolo	30.20			
100 meter 5-ball	5	MO	Sterling Franklin	55.57			
200 meter 5-ball	5	MO	Sterling Franklin	2:42.20	#2	#8	
400 meter 5-ball	5	B12	Joshua Black	6:31			Caleb Black [S]
400 meter 5-ball	5	B17	David Pavlove Cunsolo	3:03.73	#7		
400 meter 5-ball	5	MO	Sterling Franklin	5:29.76			
100 meter 7-ball	7	B17	David Pavlove Cunsolo	1:37.37	#10		
100 meter 7-ball	7	MO	Sterling Franklin	14:13			

Physical medals awarded in following divisions: 3b100/400/800/Mile/5K, 5b100/400, 7b100; Individual Ranks used to eliminate multiple per-person ranking

Divisions: B12 – Boys 12-and-Under, B17 – Boys 13-to-17, MO – Men's Open, MM – Men's Masters

Women's gold medalists and top performances
Event	Props	Division	Athlete(s)	Time	DR	ATR	Comments
100 meter 3-ball	3	G17	Marla Edgecomb	21.45			
100 meter 3-ball	3	WM	JoAnn Ireland	21.24	#4		Jill Edgecomb [S, #10 DR]
400 meter 3-ball	3	G17	Marla Edgecomb	2:00.72			
400 meter 3-ball	3	WM	JoAnn Ireland	2:02.71	#9		Jill Edgecomb [S]
800 meter 3-ball	3	G17	Marla Edgecomb	5:02.70			
800 meter 3-ball	3	WM	JoAnn Ireland	5:28.43	#4		Jill Edgecomb [S, #6 DR]
1 Mile 3-ball	3	G17	Marla Edgecomb	10:45.43			
100 meter 5-ball	5	WM	JoAnn Ireland	1:12.54	#2		Jill Edgecomb [S, #3 DR]
400 meter 5-ball	5	WM	JoAnn Ireland	6:59.52	#2		

Divisions: G17 – Girls 17-and-Under, WO – Women's Open, WM – Women's Masters

=== 2019 World Joggling Championships ===
Purdue University Track – Fort Wayne, Indiana, USA (June 29, 2019)

International Jugglers' Association 72nd Annual Festival

Men's gold medalists
Event	Props	Division	Athlete(s)	Time	DR	ATR	Comments
1000 meter 3-ball	3	B12	Izaak Jolin	4:41.56	#1		Caleb Black [S, #2 DR]
1000 meter 3-ball	3	B17	Adam Hellman	3:51.21	#1	#4	Owen Gerba [S, #2 DR], David Pavlove Cunsolo [B, #3 DR]
1000 meter 3-ball	3	MO	Sterling Franklin	3:12.59	#2	#2	Aaron Scott [S, #3 ATR], Jacob Heimer [B, #5 ATR]
1000 meter 3-ball	3	MM	Mark Jolin	5:21.69	#1		Daniel James [S, #2 DR], Barry Goldmeier [B, #3 DR]
60 meter 3-ball	3	B12	Izaak Jolin	10.52	#1		Joshua Black [S], Caleb Black [B]
60 meter 3-ball	3	B17	Bennett Santora	8.78	#1	#4	David Pavlove Cunsolo [S], Owen Gerba [B]
60 meter 3-ball	3	MO	Mark Fiore	8.28	#1	#1	Sterling Franklin [S, #2 ATR] (Note: Both Mark Fiore and Sterling Franklin broke Jamie Whoolery's 60-meter world record from 2001 at this track meet.), Mike Moore [B, #6 ATR]
60 meter 3-ball	3	MM	Nicolas Souren	9.48	#1	#5	Mark Jolin [S], Len Ferman [B]
60 meter 5-ball	5	B17	Bennett Santora	11.25	#1	#2	Kyle Albrecht [S, #3 ATR], David Pavlove Cunsolo [B, #6 ATR]
60 meter 5-ball	5	MO	Mark Fiore	8.94	#1	#1	New World Record, Mike Moore [S, #5 DR], Sterling Franklin [B, #6 DR]
60 meter 5-ball	5	MM	Nicolas Souren	19.01	#1		Len Ferman [S, #2 DR], Barry Goldmeier [B, #6 DR]
60 meter 7-ball	7	B17	Kyle Albrecht	36.91	#1	#1	Bennett Santora [S, #2 ATR]
60 meter 7-ball	7	MO	Mark Fiore	57.51	#1	#3	Mike Moore [S, #4 ATR]
800 meter WR Attempt	3	MO	Eric Walter	2:12.94	#1	#1	New World Record (Note: Timer results for Eric Walter's 800-meter world-record attempt were 2:13.00, 2:12.82, and 2:13.01. The average time of 2:12.94 registered as a new Guinness World Record.)
200 meter 3-ball	3	B12	Izaak Jolin	40.84	#4		Joshua Black [S, #7 DR], Caleb Black [B, #10 DR]
200 meter 3-ball	3	B17	Kyle Albrecht	33.21			Owen Gerba [S], Bennett Santora [B]
200 meter 3-ball	3	MO	Mark Fiore	29.38	#7	#9	Sterling Franklin [S], Mike Moore [B]
200 meter 3-ball	3	MM	Len Ferman	33.81	#9		Nicolas Souren [S, #10 DR], Mark Jolin [B]
200 meter 5-ball	5	B17	Kyle Albrecht	1:01.09	#1	#1	New World Record, Bennett Santora [S, #2 ATR], David Pavlove Cunsolo [B, #3 ATR]
200 meter 5-ball	5	MO	Mike Moore	1:28.03	#1	#4	Sterling Franklin [S, #8 ATR]
200 meter 5-ball	5	MM	Barry Goldmeier	1:28.41	#1	#5	Len Ferman [S, #6 ATR], Nicolas Souren [B, #7 ATR]
600 meter 3-ball	3	B12	Izaak Jolin	2:30.27	#1		Joshua Black [S]
600 meter 3-ball	3	B17	Adam Hellman	2:01.91	#1	#5	David Pavlove Cunsolo [S, #9 ATR], Owen Gerba [B, #10 ATR]
600 meter 3-ball	3	MO	Sterling Franklin	1:48.97	#1	#1	New World Record, Aaron Scott [S, #2 ATR], Eric Walter [B, #3 ATR]
600 meter 3-ball	3	MM	Len Ferman	1:59.63	#1	#4	Nicolas Souren [S, #7 ATR], Mark Jolin [B]
4 x 200 meter 3-ball	3	B12	Team Maria & Katie (Caleb Black, Joshua Black, Shane Kaseman, Izaak Jolin)	4:36.35	#1		
4 x 200 meter 3-ball	3	B17	Team David (Adam Hellman, David Pavlove Cunsolo, Owen Gerba, Josh Dibbin)	2:57.59	#2	#7	
4 x 200 meter 3-ball	3	MO	The Best of the Midwest (Nicolas Souren, Craig Muhlenkamp, Mark Fiore, Sterling Franklin)	2:18.94	#2	#2	Frankenstein's Jogglers [S, #4 ATR], The Quart of Guinness [B, #6 ATR]
4 x 200 meter 3-ball (Note: An additional 1600-meter run was held after the main eight events and timed by meet organizer Aaron Scott: Aaron Scott, 5:24; Sterling Franklin, 5:39.)	3	MM	The Drubblers (Barry Goldmeier, Riley McLincha)	6:41.84	#3		

Divisions: B12 – Boys 12-and-Under, B17 – Boys 13-to-17, MO – Men's Open, MM – Men's Masters

Women's gold medalists
Event	Props	Division	Athlete(s)	Time	DR	ATR	Comments
1000 meter 3-ball	3	WO	Gabrielle Foran	3:29.07	#1	#1	New World Record, Joanne Ireland [S, #3 ATR]
1000 meter 3-ball	3	WM	Heather Marriott	5:25.93	#1	#2	Becky Kresser [S, #4 ATR], Laura Kaseman [B, #5 ATR]
60 meter 3-ball	3	G12	Sarah Kresser	34.47	#1		
60 meter 3-ball	3	WO	Gabrielle Foran	10.81	#1	#4	JoAnn Ireland [S, #8 ATR]
60 meter 3-ball	3	WM	Heather Marriott	12.2	#2	#6	Laura Kaseman [S, #7 ATR], Becky Kresser [B, #8 ATR]
60 meter 5-ball	5	WO	Joann Ireland	1:00.10	#2	#3	Gabrielle Foran [S, #4 ATR]
60 meter 5-ball	5	WM	Heather Marriott	29.04	#1	#2	Laura Kaseman [S, #5 ATR], Becky Kresser [B, #6 ATR]
200 meter 3-ball	3	G12	Sarah Kresser	1:37.87	#7		
200 meter 3-ball	3	WO	Gabrielle Foran	35.76	#3	#4	JoAnn Ireland [S]
200 meter 3-ball	3	WM	Heather Marriott	46.09	#1		Becky Kresser [S, #2 DR], Laura Kaseman [B, #3 DR]
200 meter 5-ball	5	WO	JoAnn Ireland	3:23.63	#1	#1	New World Record, Gabrielle Foran [S, #2 ATR]
600 meter 3-ball	3	G12	Sarah Kresser	5:36.65	#1	#3	
600 meter 3-ball	3	WO	Gabrielle Foran	2:00.38	#1	#1	New World Record, JoAnn Ireland [S, #3 ATR]
600 meter 3-ball	3	WM	Heather Marriott	2:59.91	#1	#2	Becky Kresser [S, #4 ATR]
4 x 200 meter 3-ball	3	WM	The Fast Lane (Sarah Kresser, Becky Kresser, Heather Marriott, Laura Kaseman)	4:20.53	#1		

Divisions: WO – Women's Open, WM – Women's Masters, Mixed – Men and Women (Relay)

=== 2018 World Joggling Championships ===
Springfield College Track – Springfield, Massachusetts, USA (July 21, 2018)

International Jugglers' Association 71st Annual Festival

Men's gold medalists
Event	Props	Division	Athlete(s)	Time	DR	ATR	Comments
1600 meter 3-ball	3	B12	Izaak Jolin	9:01	#4		Vincent Kaseman [S, #9 DR], Joshua Black [B, #10 DR]
1600 meter 3-ball	3	B17	Martin Hiti	7:27			Isaac Cantor [S], David Pavlove Cunsolo [B]
1600 meter 3-ball	3	MO	Bryan Harris	6:15			Ben Fry [S], Garrett Borawski [B]
1600 meter 3-ball	3	MM	Paul Arneberg	6:38	#7		Tony Malikowski [S, #10 DR], Jack Hirschowitz [B]
100 meter 3-ball	3	B12	Izaak Jolin	19.78	#7		Vincent Kaseman [S], Joshua Black [B]
100 meter 3-ball	3	B17	Jared Ashton	14.20	#8		Kyle Albrecht [S], Martin Hiti [B]
100 meter 3-ball	3	MO	Bryan Harris	14.00			Ben Fry [S], Garrett Borawski [B]
100 meter 3-ball	3	MM	Len Ferman	20.31			Tony Malikowski [S], Jack Hirshowitz [B]
100 meter 5-ball	5	B12	Vincent Kaseman	1:10.90			
100 meter 5-ball	5	B17	Bennett Santora	27.93	#9		Kyle Albrecht [S], Isaac Cantor [B]
100 meter 5-ball	5	MO	Mike Moore	29.75			Matt Feldman [S] (Note: Matt Feldman ran the 100-meter five-ball event again as a world-record attempt. His exhibition time of 14.10 ranked second all-time.), Garrett Borawski [B]
100 meter 5-ball	5	MM	Len Ferman	58.06			Barry Goldmeier [S]
400 meter 3-ball	3	B12	Izaak Jolin	1:42.72	#8		Joshua Black [S], Vincent Kaseman [B]
400 meter 3-ball	3	B17	Kyle Albrecht	1:15.45			Martin Hiti [S], David Pavlove Cunsolo [B]
400 meter 3-ball	3	MO	Matt Feldman	1:06.65			Bryan Harris [S], Ben Fry [B]
400 meter 3-ball	3	MM	Tony Malikowski	1:17.69			Paul Arneberg [S, within .02 seconds], Jack Hirschowitz [B]
100 meter 7-ball	7	B17	Kyle Albrecht	2:04.34			Bennett Santora [S]
100 meter 7-ball	7	MO	Mike Moore	1:37.91	#6		
100 meter 7-ball	7	MM	Barry Goldmeier	4:00.00	#3		Timer stopped
400 meter 5-ball	5	B12	Vincent Kaseman	7:19.28	#4		
400 meter 5-ball	5	B17	Kyle Albrecht	2:31.77	#6		Bennett Santora [S, #7 DR], David Pavlove Cunsolo [B, #8 DR]
400 meter 5-ball	5	MO	Matt Feldman	1:22.13	#1	#1 [WR]	New World Record, Mike Moore [S, #5 DR], Garrett Borawski [B]
400 meter 5-ball	5	MM	Barry Goldmeier	4:04.27	#3		Len Ferman [S, #4 DR]
800 meter 3-ball	3	B12	Joshua Black	5:31.33			Vincent Kaseman [S], Caleb Black [B]
800 meter 3-ball	3	B17	Martin Hiti	3:39.33			Anthony Zeszut [S], David Pavlove Cunsolo [B]
800 meter 3-ball	3	MO	Matt Feldman	2:37.51	#7		Ely Doan [S], Peter Holmquist [B]
800 meter 3-ball	3	MM	Len Ferman	2:47.73	#9		Paul Arneberg [S], Tony Malikowski [B]
4 x 100 meter 3-ball	3	B12	Vincent Kaseman, Joshua Black, Caleb Black, Izaak Jolin	2:57.82			
4 x 100 meter 3-ball	3	B17	Anthony Zeszut, David Pavlove Cunsolo, Martin Hiti, Bennett Santora	1:15.50			
4 x 100 meter 3-ball	3	MO	Garrett Borawski, Ben Fry, Peter Holmquist, Bryan Harris	1:06.22	#7	#7	Ashton/Cantor/Roepe/Feldman [S]
4 x 100 meter 3-ball	3	MM	Tony Malikowski, Jack Hirschowitz, Barry Goldmeier, Len Ferman	1:19.79			

Divisions: B12 – Boys 12-and-Under, B17 – Boys 13-to-17, MO – Men's Open, MM – Men's Masters

Women's gold medalists
Event	Props	Division	Athlete(s)	Time	DR	ATR	Comments
1600 meter 3-ball	3	WO	Gabrielle Foran	5:45	#1	#1 [WR]	New World Record, Katie Bergess [S], JoAnn Ireland [B]
1600 meter 3-ball	3	WM	Becky Kresser	10:57	#5		
100 meter 3-ball	3	WO	Gabrielle Foran	18.50			Katie Burgess [S], JoAnn Ireland [B]
100 meter 3-ball	3	WM	Becky Kresser	24.03	#5		
100 meter 5-ball	5	WO	JoAnn Ireland	1:34.87	#6		Gabrielle Foran [S]
100 meter 5-ball	5	WM	Becky Kresser	3:48.63	#2		
400 meter 3-ball	3	WO	Gabrielle Foran	1:14.82	#2	#2	Katie Burgess [S], JoAnn Ireland [B]
400 meter 3-ball	3	WM	Becky Kresser	2:06.37	#9		
400 meter 5-ball	5	WO	JoAnn Ireland	6:37.97	#7	#7	
800 meter 3-ball	3	WO	Gabrielle Foran	2:38.31	#1	#1 [WR]	New World Record, Katie Burgess [S, #7 DR], JoAnn Ireland [B]
800 meter 3-ball	3	WM	Becky Kresser	5:34.07	#4		
4 x 100 meter 3-ball	3	Mixed	Katie Burgess, JoAnn Ireland, Becky Kresser, Gabrielle Foran	1:29.21			

Divisions: WO – Women's Open, WM – Women's Masters, Mixed – Men and Women (Relay)

=== 2017 World Joggling Championships ===
Coe College Track – Cedar Rapids, Iowa, USA and Certified 5K Course in Lisbon, Iowa, USA (July 22, 2017)

International Jugglers' Association 70th Annual Festival

Men's gold Medalists
Event	Props	Division	Athlete(s)	Time	DR	ATR	Comments
5K 3-ball	3	B12	Carter Randall	30:19.22	#1		New Division Record, David Pavlove Cunsolo [S, #2 DR]
5K 3-ball	3	B17	Jared Ashton	27:51.92	#7		
5K 3-ball	3	MO	Jacob Heimer	19:16.60	#9	#9	Bob Evans [S], Erik Rain [B]
5K 3-ball	3	MM	Paul Arneberg	22:37.74	#2		Shahar Cohen [S, #5 DR], Tony Malikowski [B #7 DR]
100 meter 3-ball	3	B12	Isaac Cantor	18.99	#3		David Pavlove Cunsolo [S, #6 DR], Carter Randall [B]
100 meter 3-ball	3	B17	Peter Holmquist	16.38			Bennett Santora [S], Martin Hiti [B]
100 meter 3-ball	3	MO	Mark Fiore	14.28			Mike Moore [S]
100 meter 3-ball	3	MM	Paul Arneberg	17.00			Raphael Harris [S], Jack Hirschowitz [B]
100 meter 5-ball	5	B12	Isaac Cantor	51.97	#5		Michael Yoon [S, #7 DR], Carter Randall [B, #9 DR]
100 meter 5-ball	5	B17	Benett Santora	30.85			Kyle Albrecht [S], Patrick Russell [B]
100 meter 5-ball	5	MO	Mark Fiore	39.07			Mike Moore [S]
100 meter 5-ball	5	MM	Raphael Harris	3:40.85			
400 meter 3-ball	3	B12	Isaac Cantor	1:24.31	#1		New Division Record, Carter Randall [S, #3 DR], David Pavlove Cunsolo [B, #10 DR]
400 meter 3-ball	3	B17	Peter Holmquist	1:20.53			Kyle Albrecht [S], Bennett Santora [B]
400 meter 3-ball	3	MO	Mark Fiore	1:04.44			Mike Moore [S], Jacob Heimer [B]
400 meter 3-ball	3	MM	Paul Arneberg	1:17.37			Tony Malikowski [S], Jason Noyes [B]
100 meter 7-ball	7	B17	Bennett Santora	2:30.06			Kyle Albrecht [S]
100 meter 7-ball	7	MO	Mike Moore	2:47.03	#8		
400 meter 5-ball	5	B12	Carter Randall	7:27.56	#4		
400 meter 5-ball	5	B17	Bennett Santora	5:54.41	#8		
400 meter 5-ball	5	MO	Mike Moore	3:07.78	#6		
400 meter 5-ball	5	MM	Raphael Harris	13:06.25	#3		
800 meter 3-ball	3	B12	David Pavlove Cunsolo	4:02.19	#3		Carter Randall [S, #4 DR]
800 meter 3-ball	3	B17	Peter Holmquist	3:28.57			Gerry Daher [S], Martin Hiti [B]
800 meter 3-ball	3	MO	Jacob Heimer	3:02.63			Craig Wise [S, Prop: Clubs], Mike Moore [B]
800 meter 3-ball	3	MM	Paul Arneberg	3:01.56			Tony Malikowski [S], Jason Noyes [B]
4 x 100 meter 3-ball	3	B17	St. Ignatius (Anthony Zeszut, Gerry Daher, Nick Pisanelli, Martin Hiti)	1:18.69			Pokémon Go [S], Jared's Jeans [B]
4 x 100 meter 3-ball	3	Mixed	Are you saying Bolt? (Mike Moore, Mark Fiore, Gabrielle Foran, Jacob Heimer)	1:10.31			Running for Board [S]
4 x 100 meter 3-ball	3	MM	Greater than 50 (Kirt Albrecht, Tony Malikowski, Jack Hirschowitz, Mike Patsch)	1:42.87			

Divisions: B12 – Boys 12-and-Under, B17 – Boys 13-to-17, MO – Men's Open, MM – Men's Masters, Mixed – Mixed Men and Women (Relay)

Women's gold medalists
Event	Props	Division	Athlete(s)	Time	DR	ATR	Comments
5K 3-ball	3	WO	Gabrielle Foran	19:29.67	#1	#1 [WR]	New World Record, Katie Burgess [S, #4 ATR]
5K 3-ball	3	WM	Sarah Williams	45:37.06			Mary Geeves [S]
100 meter 3-ball	3	G12	Rebecca Moore	30.31	#5		
100 meter 3-ball	3	G17	Kayla Malmgren	17.84	#7		Laura Schroeder [S, #8 DR], Eva Hadjiyanis [B]
100 meter 3-ball	3	WO	Gabrielle Foran	18.27	#8		Schivella Schwab [S]
100 meter 5-ball	5	G17	Kayla Malmgren	1:15.12			Elizabeth Stockbridge [S]
100 meter 5-ball	5	WO	Gabrielle Foran	2:17.91			
400 meter 3-ball	3	G12	Rebecca Moore	1:28.47	#1		New Division Record
400 meter 3-ball	3	G17	Elizabeth Stockbridge	1:31.88	#2		Laura Schroeder [S, #3 DR], Kayla Malmgren [B]
400 meter 3-ball	3	WO	Gabrielle Foran	1:23.38	#4	#4	Shivelle Schwab [S]
400 meter 3-ball	3	WM	Mary Geeves	5:01.53			
800 meter 3-ball	3	G12	Rebecca Moore	3:50.18	#1		New Division Record
800 meter 3-ball	3	G17	Laura Schroeder	4:04.75	#6		
800 meter 3-ball	3	WO	Gabrielle Foran	2:45.83	#4	#4	
800 meter 3-ball	3	WM	Mary Geeves	12:11.22	#5		
4 x 100 meter 3-ball	3	G17	Steve and the hippos (Laura Schroeder, Eva Hadjiyanis, Elizabeth Stockbridge, Kayla Malmgren)	1:15.88	#1	#1 [WR]	New World Record

Divisions: G12 – Girls 12-and-Under, G17 – Girls 13-to-17, WO – Women's Open, WM – Women's Masters

=== 2016 World Joggling Championships ===
El Paso, Texas, USA (July 30, 2016)

International Jugglers' Association 69th Annual Festival

Men's gold medalists
Event	Props	Division	Athlete(s)	Time	DR	ATR	Comments
100 meter 3 ball	3	B12	Bennett Santora	20.53	#7		
100 meter 3 ball	3	B17	Adam Eckman	20.50			Matt Bagley [S], Anthony Zeszut [B]
100 meter 3 ball	3	MO	Christopher Van Hoomissen	14.34			Jeff Lutkus [S], Mike Moore [B]
100 meter 3 ball	3	MM	Nicolas Souren	14.97	#5		Neil Jordaan [S], Mike Patsch [B]
100 meter 5 ball	5	B12	Bennett Santora	28.88	#1		New Division Record
100 meter 5 ball	5	B17	Adam Eckman	1:15.19			Matt Bagley [S]
100 meter 5 ball	5	MO	Mike Moore	43.69			Christopher Van Hoomissen [S], Jeff Lutkus [B]
100 meter 5 ball	5	MM	Nicolas Souren	27.09	#3		Robert D'Amours [S]
100 meter 7 ball	7	B12	Bennett Santora	3:19.44	#1		New Division Record
100 meter 7 ball	7	MO	Mike Moore	3:09.15	#9		
100 meter 7 ball	7	MM	Nicolas Souren	2:53.00	#2		
400 meter 3 ball	3	B12	Bennett Santora	1:56.78			
400 meter 3 ball	3	B17	Adam Eckman	1:22.72			Matt Bagley [S], Anthony Zeszut [B]
400 meter 3 ball	3	MO	Mike Moore	1:12.75			Christopher Van Hoomissen [S], Jeff Lutkus [B]
400 meter 3 ball	3	MM	Nicolas Souren	1:16.19	#10		Neil Jordaan [S], Mike Patsch [B]
400 meter 5 ball	5	B12	Bennett Santora	4:55.78			
400 meter 5 ball	5	B17	Matt Bagley	5:00.03	#6		Adam Eckman [S, #7 DR]
400 meter 5 ball	5	MO	Mike Moore	3:31.47	#7		Christopher Van Hoomissen [S, #9 DR]
400 meter 5 ball	5	MM	Nicolas Souren	2:42.34	#2	#9	
800 meter 3 ball	3	B12	Bennett Santora	5:01.75	#1		New Division Record
800 meter 3 ball	3	B17	Adam Eckman	3:07.22			Matt Bagley [S], Anthony Zeszut [B]
800 meter 3 ball	3	MO	Jeff Lutkus	3:04.31			Mike Moore [S], Nathan Wakefield [B]
800 meter 3 ball	3	MM	Nicolas Souren	3:04.82			Neil Jordaan [S]
1 mile 3 ball	3	B17	Adam Eckman	7:04	#9		Matt Bagley [S], Anthony Zeszut [B]
1 mile 3 ball	3	MO	Jeff Lutkus	6:44			Mike Moore [S], Nathan Wakefield [B]
1 mile 3 ball	3	MM	Nicolas Souren	6:47	#7		Neil Jordaan [S]
4 x 100 meter 3 ball	3	B17	O.K. (Bennett Santora, Matt Bagley, Adam Eckman, Anthony Zeszut)	1:28.19			
4 x 100 meter 3 ball	3	MO	Drop Gballz (Mike Moore, Neil Jordaan, Jeff Lutkus, Nicolas Souren)	1:11.15			

Divisions: B12 – Boys 12-and-Under, B17 – Boys 13-to-17, MO – Men's Open, MM – Men's Masters

Women's gold medalists
Event	Props	Division	Athlete(s)	Time	DR	ATR	Comments
100 meter 3 ball	3	WO	Gabrielle Foran	20.12			
100 meter 3 ball	3	WM	Heather Mariott	19.31	#3		Teresa Rochester [S]
400 meter 3 ball	3	WO	Gabrielle Foran	1:13.85	#1	#1 [WR]	New World Record
400 meter 3 ball	3	WM	Heather Mariott	1:43.12	#5		Teresa Rochester [S]
800 meter 3 ball	3	WO	Gabrielle Foran	2:44.44	#2		
800 meter 3 ball	3	WM	Heather Mariott	4:02.84	#2		
1 mile 3 ball	3	WO	Gabrielle Foran	5:40	#1	#1 [WR]	New World Record
1 mile 3 ball	3	WM	Heather Mariott	8:39	#3		
4 x 100 meter 3 ball	3	Mixed	Masters of the Universe (Heather Mariott, Teresa Rochester, Gabrielle Foran, Mike Patsch)	2:13.78			

Divisions: WO – Women's Open, WM – Women's Masters, Mixed – Mixed Men and Women (Relay)

=== 2015 World Joggling Championships ===
Québec City, Québec, Canada (July 25, 2015)

International Jugglers' Association 68th Annual Festival

Overall top performances:

Men's Open Division
Distance	Prop number	Participant	Time
100 meter	3	Matan Presberg	13.16
100 meter	5	Nicholas Thomas	24.71
100 meter	7	Nicholas Thomas	1:02.47
400 meter	3	Michael Bergeron	1:01.91
400 meter	5	Ben Thompson	1:44.28 (IJA Road Race Record)
800 meter	3	Michael Bergeron	2:21.78
1600 meter	3	Michael Bergeron	5:13
4x100 meter relay	3	Team International (Eric Gunther, Daniel Raum, Ben Fry, Michael Bergeron)	1:04.02

Women's Open Division
Distance	Prop number	Participant	Time
100 meter	3	Gabrielle Foran	17.xx
400 meter	3	Gabrielle Foran	1:15.47 (IJA Road Race Record)
800 meter	3	Gabrielle Foran	2:39.66 (IJA Road Race Record)
1600 meter	3	Gabrielle Foran	5:25 (IJA Road Race Record)

Men's Masters Division
Distance	Prop number	Participant	Time
100 meter	3	Jean-Guy Beaudry	17.xx
100 meter	5	Jean-Guy Beaudry	1:14.81
400 meter	3	Jean-Guy Beaudry	1:28.72
800 meter	3	Jean-Guy Beaudry	3:39.06
1600 meter	3	Peter Hedberg	7:29 (Note: Adjusted to a 1600-meter equivalent; several heats of the 1600-meter event were run on a 1790-meter path.)

Women's Masters Division
Distance	Prop number	Participant	Time
100 meter	3	Alda Moettus	56.xx
100 meter	5	Jean-Guy Beaudry	1:14.81
800 meter	3	Mary Geeves	9:57.47
1600 meter	3	Jeri Kalvan	8:25
4x100 meter relay (Mixed G17/WM)	3	Keep Running (Riga Moettus, Alda Moettus, Mary Geeves, Laura Schroeder)	2:28.90

Boys 13-to-17 Division
Distance	Prop number	Participant	Time
100 meter	3	Christopher van Hoomisson	13.xx
100 meter	5	Jonah Botuinick-Greenhouse	28.31
100 meter	7	Jonah Botuinick-Greenhouse	1:43.37
400 meter	3	Cole Dunbar	1:10.09
400 meter	5	Daniel van Hoomissen	3:43.59
800 meter	3	Ryan Gerrity	3:06.97
1600 meter	3	Cole Dunbar	6:40
4x100 meter relay	3	Cole Dunbar, Max Schlech, Nick DeBoom, Chris van Hoomissen	1:09.19

Girls 13-to-17 Division
Distance	Prop number	Participant	Time
100 meter	3	Riga Moettus	19.xx
100 meter	5	Delaney Bayles	37.50
100 meter	7	Delaney Bayles	1:56.53
400 meter	3	Cole Dunbar	1:10.09
400 meter	5	Delaney Bayles	1:56.53
800 meter	3	Sarah Earl	3:20.87
1600 meter	3	Sarah Earl	7:06

Boys 12-and-Under Division
Distance	Prop number	Participant	Time
100 meter	3	Bennett Santora	21.xx
100 meter	5	Bennett Santora	50.78
100 meter	7	Bennett Santora	4:06.84
400 meter	3	Bennett Santora	2:01.00
400 meter	5	Bennett Santora	4:01.32
800 meter	3	Bennett Santora	4:24.00

=== 2014 World Joggling Championships ===
Purdue University – West Lafayette, Indiana (August 2, 2014)

International Jugglers' Association 67th Annual Festival

Overall top performances:

Men
Distance	Prop number	Participant	Time
100 meter	3	Jared Janssen	13.9
100 meter	5	Ben Thompson	20.1
100 meter	7	Nicholas Thomas	1:10.1
400 meter	3	Kylen McClintock	1:08.3
400 meter	5	Nicholas Thomas	2:04.2 (#1 all time championship performance)
800 meter	3	Len Ferman	2:26.4
1600 meter	3	Cooper Williams	5:45.4
4x100 meter relay	3	Nicholas Thomas, Ben Thompson, Jason Hollandsworth, Mark Fiore	1:02.4

Women
Distance	Prop number	Participant	Time
100 meter	3	Gabrielle Foran	17.7
100 meter	5	Delaney Bayles	29.9 (#1 all time, New World Record)
100 meter	7	Delaney Bayles	1:52.7 (#1 all time, New World Record)
400 meter	3	Gabrielle Foran	1:16.6 (#1 all time, New World Record)
400 meter	5	Delaney Bayles	2:33.3 (#1 all time, New World Record)
800 meter	3	Gabrielle Foran	2:41.9 (#1 all time, New World Record)
1600 meter	3	Gabrielle Foran	5:51.6 (#1 all time, New World Record)
4x100 meter relay	3	Gabrielle Foran, Heather Marriott, Delaney Bayles, Chloe Hirshowitz	1:26.0

=== 2013 World Joggling Championships ===
Bowling Green State University – Bowling Green, Ohio (July 20, 2013)

International Jugglers' Association 66th Annual Festival

Overall top performances:

Men
Distance	Prop number	Participant	Time
100 meter	3	Jared Janssen	14.6
100 meter	5	Thomas Dietz	21.5
100 meter	7	Thomas Dietz	0:53.6 (#1 all time, New World Record)
400 meter	3	Eric Walter	0:55.8 (#1 all time, New World Record)
400 meter	5	Mark Fiore	2:09.6 (#1 all time age group performance)
800 meter	3	Eric Walter	2:20 (#2 all time age group performance)
1600 meter	3	Nathan Lane	5:26 (#1 all time age group performance)
4x100 meter relay	3	Peter Prokop, Scott Geyman, Jared Janssen, Nathan Lane	1:04.7

Women
Distance	Prop number	Participant	Time
100 meter	3	Sydney Paugh, Anna Voelker (Tie)	17.8
100 meter	5	Delaney Bayles	48.0
400 meter	3	Gabrielle Foran	1:23.8 (#2 all time age group performance)
800 meter	3	Gabrielle Foran	2:51.2 (#2 all time age group performance)
1600 meter	3	Gabrielle Foran	5:58 (#1 all time, New World Record)
4x100 meter relay	3	Riga Moettus, Laura Schroeder, Elise Johnson, Erica Liddle	1:30.4

Qualifiers: 100m 7-ball: Must be able to juggle 7 consistently, 400m 5-ball: Must finish 100m 5-ball event in under 90 seconds to qualify.

=== 2012 World Joggling Championships ===
Winston-Salem, North Carolina (July 21, 2012)

International Jugglers' Association 65th Annual Festival

Overall top performances:

Men
Distance	Prop number	Participant	Time
100 meter	3	Albert Lucas	14.1
100 meter	5	Albert Lucas	16.8 (#2 all time championships performance)
100 meter	7	Jack Denger	1:29.9 (#9 all time championships performance)
400 meter	3	Chris Lovdal	1:03.8
400 meter	5	Jack Denger	2:25.4 (#1 all time championships performance)
800 meter	3	Len Ferman	2:33 (#9 all time championships performance)
1600 meter	3	Dylan Waickman	6:22
4x100 meter relay	3	Team Exerball (Albert Lucas, Nicolas Souren, Jason Matkowski, Chris Lovdal)	58.0

Women
Distance	Prop number	Participant	Time
100	3	Sydney Paugh	16.4 (#4 all time championships performance)
100	5	Riga Moettus	1:14.1 (#9 all time championships performance)
400	3	Maggie Armstrong	1:34.3
400	5	Riga Moettus	5:23.8 (#1 all time championships performance)
800	3	Maggie Armstrong	3:44 (#6 all time championships performance)
1600	3	Alayna Bowlin	9:24
4x100 meter relay	3	Happiness Club (Elise Johnson, Riga Moettus, Laura Schroeder, Alayna Bowlin)	1:35.6

=== 2011 World Joggling Championships ===
Rochester, Minnesota. Conditions: 96 degrees, sunny, strong headwind on homestretch.

International Jugglers' Association 64th Annual Festival

MEN
Distance	Prop number	Participant	Time
100 meter	3 ball	Chris Lovdal	14.28
100 meter	5 ball	Jack Denger	27.15
100 meter	7 ball	Jack Denger	1:02.75 (#2 all time)
200 meter	3 ball	Eric Walter	26.81 (#2 all time)
400 meter	3 ball	Eric Walter	57.66 (IJA CHAMPIONSHIP RECORD – first person to break 1 minute at IJA)
800 meter	3 ball	Eric Walter	2:13.24 (IJA CHAMPIONSHIP RECORD – first person to break 2:20 at IJA) – IJA WORLD RECORD
1600 meter	3 ball	Billy Watson	5:42.00
5k	3 ball	Charles Schweitzer	17:57.36 (#4 all time)
4 x 100 Relay	3 ball	Chris Lovdal, Eric Walter, Tyler Wishau, Charles Schweitzer	55.82 – IJA CHAMPIONSHIP RECORD / IJA WORLD RECORD
4 x 400 Relay	3 ball	Billy Watson, Jack Levy, Joey Spicola, Joe Gould	5:50.96

WOMEN
Distance	Prop number	Participant	Time
100 meter	3 ball	Trish Evans	16.29 (#3 all time)
100 meter	5 ball	Taylor Glenn	1:12 (#5 all time)
100 meter	7 ball	Taylor Glenn	5:21.13 (#2 all time)
200 meter	3 ball	Trish Evans	31.83 (IJA CHAMPIONSHIP RECORD / IJA WORLD RECORD)
400 meter	3 ball	Maggie Armstrong	1:36.31
800 meter	3 ball	Trish Evans	2:44.73 (IJA CHAMPIONSHIP RECORD / IJA WORLD RECORD)
1600 meter	3 ball	Sydney Paugh	10:18.29
5k	3 ball	Trish Evans	21:46.28 (IJA CHAMPIONSHIP RECORD / IJA WORLD RECORD)
4 x 100 Relay	3 ball	Grace Boatman, Maggie Armstrong, Sydney Paugh, Hannah Bowlin	1:17.98 (IJA championship record, IJA World record)
4 x 400 Relay	3 ball	Grace Boatman, Maggie Armstrong, Sydney Paugh, Hannah Bowlin	8:01.77 (IJA championship record, IJA World record)

=== 2010 World Joggling Championships ===
Results from the 2010 World Joggling Championships (July 27 in Sparks, Nevada).

International Jugglers' Association 63rd Annual Festival

2010 MEN's RESULTS
Prop number	Distance	Participant	Time
7 ball	100 meters	Lauge Benjaminsen	58.4
5 ball	100 meters	Lauge Benjaminsen	24.0
3 ball	100 meters	Chris Lovdal & Tyler Wishau (tie)	13.9
3 ball	200 meters	Sean Carney	29.5
3 ball	400 meters	Chris Lovdal	1:07.9
3 ball	800 meters	Tyler Wishau	2:23.6
3 ball	1600 meters	Billy Watson	5:27
3 ball	5000 meters	Tyler Wishau	19:41

2010 WOMEN'S RESULTS
Prop number	Distance	Participant	Time
7 ball	100 metres	Meagan Nouis	3:05.8
5 ball	100 meters	Mara Moettus	1:38
3 ball	100 meters	Heather Marriott	20.1
3 ball	200 meters	Heather Marriott	42.1
3 ball	400 meters	Heather Marriott	1:38.3
3 ball	800 meters	Heather Marriott	3:39.3

'"IJA World Ball Juggler"' 3 ball 50 meters Jason Cunningham, 2:46.1

=== 2009 World Joggling Championships ===
International Jugglers' Association 62nd Annual Festival

Gold medalists, Men's Open
Prop number	Distance	Participant	Time
7 Ball	100 Meter	David Ferman	1:06
5 Ball	100 Meter	David Ferman	22.6
3 Ball	100 Meter	David Ferman	13.9
3 Ball	200 Meter	David Ferman	27.9
3 Ball	400 Meter	David Ferman	63.2
3 Ball	800 Meter	Tyler Wishau	2:21
3 Ball	1600 Meter	Tyler Wishau	5:33
3 Ball	5k	Tyler Wishau	18:47

Gold medalists, Women's Open
Prop number	Distance	Participant	Time
5 Ball	100 Meter	Taylor Glenn	1:07.5
3 Ball	100 Meter	TIE: Taylor Glenn and Hanna Stoehr	18.85
3 Ball	200 Meter	Sofia Meyer	44.75
3 Ball	400 Meter	Heather Marriott	1:30.6
3 Ball	800 Meter	Heather Marriott	3:47
3 Ball	1600 Meter	Heather Marriott	8:33

=== 2008 World Joggling Championships ===
International Jugglers' Association 61st Annual Festival

2008 IJA World Joggling Championship gold medalists Men's Open
Prop number	Distance	Participant	Time
5 Ball	100 Meter	Andrew Ruiz	31.6
3 Ball	100 Meter	Jeremy Stanley	14.1
3 Ball	200 Meter	Benjamin Thompson	29.9
3 Ball	400 Meter	Perry Romanowski	1:06
3 Ball	800 Meter	Lenny Ferman	2:23
3 Ball	1600 Meter	Lenny Ferman	5:40
3 Ball	5k	Perry Romanowski	21:50

=== Other ===
Additional races and exhibitions have been organized in recent years by Albert Lucas for the International Sport Juggling Federation, including an exhibition race at the 2001 Prefontaine Classic in Eugene, Oregon. Lucas has joggled marathons, and has joggled in races over hurdle courses.

=== World Records ===
Men
Distance (meters)	Prop number	Participant	Time	Year
60	3	Mark Fiore	8.28	2019
100	3	Owen Morse	11.68	1989
100	4	Mark Fiore	13.97	2023
100	5	Matthew Feldman	13.3	2018
100	6	Sterling Franklin	1:26.88	2024
100	7	Chris Fowler	41.83	2022
200	3	Chris Essick	26.1	2001
200	4	Sterling Franklin	32.70	2024
200	5	Matthew Feldman	37.67	2021
400	3	Eric Walter	55.8	2013
400	4	Sterling Franklin	1:23.56	2024
400	5	Matthew Feldman	1:10	2011
600	3	Sterling Franklin	1:42.96	2021
800	3	Caleb Williams	2:10.95	2021
800	4	Sterling Franklin	3:39.98	2022
1000	3	Eric Walter	2:47	2013
1600	3	Caleb Williams	4:35.33	2023
1600	5	Matthew Feldman	6:34	2012
3K	3	Sterling Franklin	11:10.9	2020
3200	3	John Baker	11:33.17	2021
5K	3	Michael-Lucien Bergeron	16:50	2020
5K	5	Matthew Feldman	27:06	2011
10K	3	Michael Lucien-Bergeron	34:47.00	2022
10K	4	Michal Kapral	55:48	2019
Half Marathon	3	Michal Kapral	1:20:40	2014
Marathon	3	Michal Kapral	2:50:12	2007
50K	3	Daniel Raum	4:55:24	2012
50 miles	3	Rick Kwiatkowski	7:53:56	2018
4 x 100	3	Chris Lovdal, Eric Walter, Tyler Wishau, Charles Schweitzer	55.8	2011
4 x 200	3	Team Exerball (Barry Goldmeier, Jamie Whoolery, Chris Essick, Sam Hartford, USA)	2:10.5	2002
4 x 400	3	Team Exerball (Albert Lucas, Owen Morse, Jon Wee, Tuey Wilson)	3:57	1990

Women
Distance (meters)	Prop number	Participant	Time	Year
60	3	Lana Bolin	9.98	2001
100	3	Lana Bolin	15.0	2000
100	5	Delaney Bayles	29.9	2014
100	7	Delaney Bayles	1:52	2014
200	3	Trish Evans	31.8	2011
400	3	Gabrielle Foran	1:14	2016
400	5	Delaney Bayles	2:33	2014
600	3	Gabrielle Foran	2:00	2019
800	3	Gabrielle Foran	2:40	2015
1600	3	Gabrielle Foran	5:40	2015
5k	3	Gabrielle Foran	18:12	2015
10k	3	Gabrielle Foran	40:06	2016
Half Marathon	3	Dana Guglielmo	1:35:15	2013
4 x 100	3	Steve and the Hippos (L. Schroeder, E. Hadjiyanis, E.Stockbridge, K.Malmgren)	1:15	2017
4 x 400	3	Jugheads (Lana Bolin, Kelsey Deutsch, Hayley Fix, Erika Randall, USA)	5:39	2000

International media footage has featured the battle for the marathon record between Canadian Michal Kapral and American Zach Warren. The history of the record includes:

Time	Date	Location	Participant
2:50:12	September 2007	Toronto	Michal Kapral (Canada)
2:52:15	November 2006	Philadelphia	Zach Warren (USA)
2:57:39	September 2006	Toronto	Michal Kapral (Canada)
2:58:23	April 2006	Boston	Zach Warren (USA)
3:06:45	April, 2006	Boston	Michal Kapral (Canada)
3:07:5	November 2005	Philadelphia, PA	Zach Warren (USA)
3:07:46	September, 2005	Toronto, Canada	Michal Kapral (Canada)
3:20:49	August, 2000	Karlsruhe, Germany	Paul-Erik Lillholm (Norway)
3:22	1988	Salmon River, Idaho	Ashrita Furman (USA)
4:04	1987	Los Angeles, CA	Albert Lucas (USA)

At one point, Albert Lucas simultaneously held the record for "Most Objects Juggled" and "Fastest Marathon While Juggling".
