= Anthony J. Marsella =

American psychiatrist

- Born: September 12, 1940; Cleveland, Ohio, U.S.
- Died: November 10, 2024 (aged 84); Atlanta, Georgia, U.S.
- Education: Pennsylvania State University
- Occupations: Psychiatrist, Writer, Academic
- Children: 2

Anthony J. Marsella (1940-2024) was an American author and academic who was professor emeritus of psychology at the University of Hawaiʻi at Mānoa. He was a pioneer in the study of cultural determinants of psychopathology and therapies, and a leader in cross-cultural psychology and global and international psychology. Many of his writings are considered essential reading for students and scholars in psychology, psychiatry, and the social sciences. During his career he challenged the ethnocentricity and inherent cultural and racial biases of Western psychology and psychiatry.

== Early life ==
Anthony Joseph Marsella was born on September 12, 1940 into an immigrant Sicilian-American family in Cleveland, Ohio. His academic and extracurricular record resulted in his selection as 'Teenager of the Year' in Cleveland, which came with an appearance on The Ed Sullivan Show.

== Academic career ==
Marsella studied at Baldwin Wallace College in Berea, Ohio where he received his B.A. degree with Honors in Psychology in 1962. During his undergraduate years, he was a volunteer at local mental hospitals where he interacted with severely disturbed clients, stimulating a lifelong interest in schizophrenia, mood disorders, and trauma, that subsequently became the topic of his doctoral dissertation in clinical psychology at Pennsylvania State University in 1968. In the course of his doctoral work, he minored in cultural anthropology and philosophy of science.

After completing an internship at Worcester State Hospital, Worcester, Massachusetts, Marsella received an appointment as a Fulbright Research Scholar to Ateneo de Manila University, Quezon City, Philippines, where he taught and conducted research on social stress and psychopathology in urban Manila. Marsella subsequently served as field research director for a large-scale psychiatric epidemiological survey in the jungles of Sarawak, Borneo designed to determine rates of mental illness among Chinese, Malay, and Iban (an indigenous tribal group) populations.

Following a post-doctoral year as a Culture and Mental Health Fellow at the East-West Center/SSRI in Honolulu, Marsella was appointed to the faculty of the Department of Psychology at the University of Hawaiʻi at Mānoa, a position he held until he retired in 2003. Having taught at the University of Hawaiʻi since 1970, between the years 1985-1989, he served as Vice President for Academic Affairs at the University of Hawaiʻi. He was most Emeritus Professor of Psychology, and Past Director of the World Health Organization Psychiatric Research Center in Honolulu, Past Director of the Clinical Studies Program, and Past Director of the Disaster Management and Humanitarian Assistance Program at the University of Hawai`i.

Marsella published over twenty edited and authored books, and more than 300 book chapters, journal articles, technical reports, book reviews, and popular national and international press/media service articles. He was awarded numerous research and training grants and contracts in the areas of cross-cultural psychopathology and psychotherapy, PTSD, social stress and coping, schizophrenia, disasters, and the global challenges of our times. He served on many journal editorial boards, and scientific and professional advisory committees.

Marsella received the Medal of Highest Honor from Sōka University in Tokyo, Japan, for his contributions to the academy and to the promotion of international peace. In 1996, the American Psychological Association selected Dr. Marsella for the Distinguished Contributions to the International Advancement of Psychology Award. He was listed in Who's Who in America in 1996. In November, 1999, he was awarded an honorary doctorate degree – Doctoris Honoris Causa by the University of Copenhagen, Denmark.

In 2003, Psychologists for Social Responsibility (PsySR) created the annual Anthony J. Marsella Prize for Peace and Social Justice in honor of his work. Marsella was named as 2004's International Psychologist of the year. Also that year, the book he co-edited with Fathali M. Moghaddam entitled Understanding Terrorism: Psychological Roots, Consequences, and Interventions was selected as a "Outstanding Academic Title" by CHOICE (Current Reviews for Academic Libraries) of the American Library Association.

== Post-retirement ==
After retiring from the University of Hawaiʻi at Mānoa after 35 years, Marsella made his home in Atlanta, Georgia, where he lived for two decades.

In a 2008 essay, Identity: Beyond Self, Culture, Nation, and Humanity to "Lifeism" he advocated for Lifeism, identification with life, as our most essential and most authentic identity. In 2011 he published an article entitled “Nonkilling psychology and lifeism”.

Marsella died peacefully on November 10, 2024 after a long period of illness, at his home, survived by his wife of 50 years, Joy who retired as an English professor from at University of Hawaiʻi at Mānoa, two daughters, and four grandchildren.

== Publications ==
=== Singly authored books ===
- Marsella, Anthony J. (2016) Gatherings: A Collection of Writing Genre USA: Mountain Arbor Press
- Marsella, Anthony J. (2016) In Pursuit of "Schizophrenia": Reflections on “Imprecision” in Scientific and Professional Thought and Practice USA: Mountain Arbor Press
- Marsella, Anthony J. (2016) Poems Across Time and Place: A Journey of Heart and Mind USA: Mountain Arbor Press
- Marsella, Anthony J. (2016) The Alphabet of the South USA: Mountain Arbor Press
- Marsella, Anthony J. (2016) War, Peace, Justice: An Unfinished Tapestry... USA: Mountain Arbor Press
- Marsella, Anthony J. (2023) God as Neighbor: Imagine the conversations! USA: Readersmagnet LLC

=== Edited and coedited volumes and anthologies ===
- Marsella, Anthony J.; White, Geoffrey M., eds. (1982). Cultural Conceptions of Mental Health and Therapy (Culture, Illness and Healing). USA: D. Reidel Publishing Company.
- Marsella, Anthony J.; Corsini, Robert M. A.; Katz, Martin M., eds. (1983). Personality theories, research & assessment. USA: F.E. Peacock.
- Marsella, Anthony J.; Hirschfeld, Robert M. A.; Katz, Martin M., eds. (1987). The Measurement of Depression. USA: The Guilford Press.
- Marsella, Anthony J.; Moghaddam, Fathali M., eds. (2003). Understanding Terrorism: Psychosocial Roots, Consequences, and Interventions: Psychosocial Roots, Consequences and Interventions. USA: American Psychological Association.
- Marsella, Anthony J.; Aukahi Austin, Ayda; Grant, Bruce, eds. (2006). Social Change and Psychosocial Adaptation in the Pacific Islands: Cultures in Transition (International and Cultural Psychology). USA: Springer.
- Marsella, Anthony J.; White, James D., eds. (2007). Fear of Persecution: Global Human Rights, International Law, and Human Well-being. USA: Lexington Books.
- Marsella, Anthony J.; Johnson, Jeanette L.; Watson, Patricia; Gryczynski, Jan, eds. (2013). Ethnocultural Perspectives on Disaster and Trauma: Foundations, Issues, and Applications. USA: Springer.
- Marsella, Anthony J., ed. (2013). Cross-Cultural Counseling and Psychotherapy. USA: Pergamon.
- Marsella, Anthony J.; Friedman, Matthew J.; Gerrity, Ellen T.; Scurfield, Raymond M., eds. (2019). Ethnocultural Aspects of Posttraumatic Stress Disorder: Issues, Research, and Clinical Applications. USA: American Psychological Association.
