= Michal Kapral =

Canadian joggler

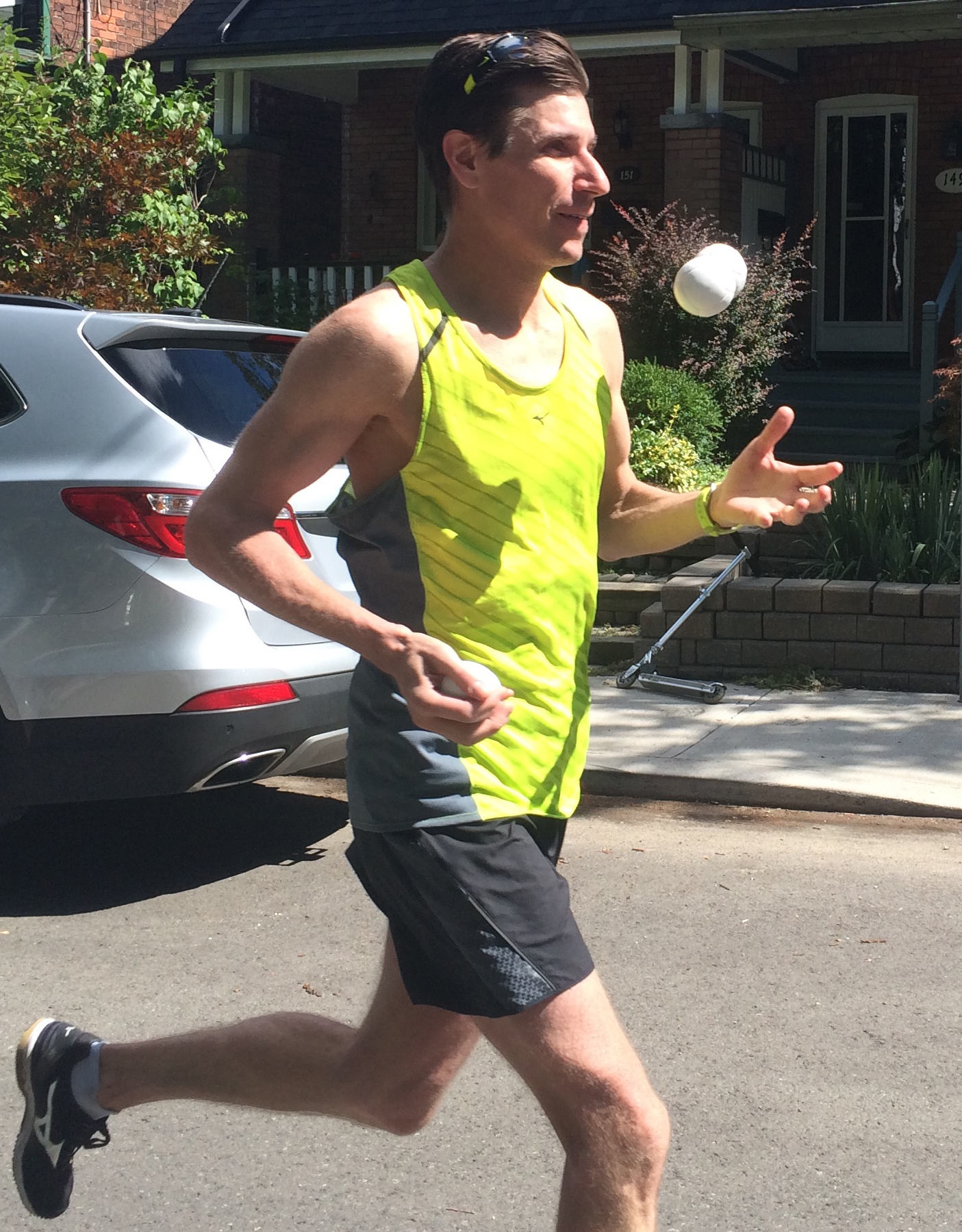
- Born: 1972 (age 53–54); Toronto, Ontario
- Occupation: Joggler
- Years active: 1999–present
- Spouse: Dianne Kapral
- Children: 2
- Website: Official website

Michal Kapral (born 1972) is a Canadian joggler based in Toronto, Ontario. He owns the world records for running the fastest marathon and half-marathon while juggling, for the fastest 10-kilometer run while juggling without a drop, and formerly held the world record for fastest marathon while pushing a stroller.

== Career ==
=== Joggling ===
Joggling was conceived by Bill Giduz in 1975. The first official joggling event took place at the 1981 International Jugglers' Association festival in North Dakota. The sport has two primary rules: a runner must juggle at least three objects every step of the way, and if the object drops, the runner must pick it up and continue running from the point where the drop occurred. Kapral first learned of joggling at the age of 11, when he saw the world record listed in The Guinness Book of World Records, and started running after graduating from college. He completed his first marathon in 1999, and in 2002 won the Toronto Marathon with a time of 2:30:40, his best overall marathon time. Earlier that year, he was the top Canadian finisher at the Boston Marathon.

In 2004, at the Toronto Waterfront Marathon, Kapral set the world record for fastest marathon while pushing a baby (his daughter Annika) in a stroller with a time of 2:49:43, besting the previous record by over an hour. After the race, he stated that the next year he would run the marathon while juggling. He quickly became proficient at juggling. In September 2005, he joggled his first marathon as a charity stunt for Toronto's SickKids Hospital, initially planning to do it just the one time. He wound up setting the marathon joggling record with a time of 3:07:41, thirteen minutes faster than the previous mark, leading him to pursue the sport further.

Two months later, Kapral's marathon joggling record was broken by Zach Warren. Shortly after that, they faced off at the 2006 Boston Marathon, which was the first time two jogglers had ever participated in the same marathon. Kapral would go on to regain, lose and regain the world record, setting the current marathon joggling world record with a time of 2:50:12 in 2007, while also chewing gum throughout the race. After experimenting with balls and beanbags in his first joggling marathons, beginning with his record-setting run he joggled using handmade beanbags filled with millet. Kapral set the Guinness world record for the fastest 10-kilometer joggling run without a drop at the Longboat Toronto Island Run in September 2006. In 2014, Kapral set the world record for fastest joggling half-marathon at the Toronto Waterfront Marathon, with a time of 1:20:40, dropping just one ball.

At the 2015 New York City Marathon, organizers prevented Kapral from joggling by deeming beanbags a prohibited item for security reasons. In August 2016, Kapral ran a beer mile (drinking four beers while running a mile) while also juggling, completing the task in eight minutes and 49 seconds. The world record for running the beer mile (without juggling) is held by Corey Bellemore, with a time of 4:34:35 at the 2016 Beer Mile World Classic in London. In October 2016, Kapral ran the Chicago Marathon while juggling, managing to do so without dropping any balls, and finishing with a time of 2 hours and 55 minutes. It was his eighth joggling marathon and first time completing one without a single drop.

Kapral, who competed in the 3,000-meter steeplechase in high school, stated in 2016 that he plans to start training to complete a steeplechase while juggling.

=== Film and television ===
The 2011 documentary Breaking and Entering, directed by Benjamin Fingerhut, profiles various people obsessed with getting their names in the Guinness Book of World Records. Among other stories, the film chronicles the rivalry of marathon jogglers Kapral and Zach Warren.

In 2015, Kapral was featured in a Fairfield Inn television commercial.

=== Writing and editing ===
Kapral works as a writer and editor at a healthcare group in Toronto. He was formerly an editor for Captivate Network, which operates electronic news boards found in elevators, and was formerly the editor of Canadian Running magazine.

== Personal life ==
Kapral and his wife Dianne have two daughters, Annika and Lauryn.
