= Afghan Mobile Mini Children's Circus =

Afghan traveling educational entertainment group

Mobile Mini Children's Circus (MMCC) is an organization founded in 2002 by Danish instructor David Mason to teach about cooperation and creativity to children who were affected by war. It operates in Afghanistan with its local partner, Afghan Educational Children's Circus. Originally headquartered at the Children's Culture House in Kabul, MMCC expanded its approach by implementing "Funtainers" a semi-permanent spaces, which were made by modifying shipping containers at the beginning of 2008. Following the 2021 Fall of Kabul, the organization used a decentralized approach where they put the program based on the needs of the participant around their centres rather than making them attend the lessons in the headquarter and also implemented few adaptations to its activities as a way to face the restriction of education for females over 12 years old.

== History and activity ==
Mobile Mini-Circus for Children was founded by David Mason in 2002 as an organization to teach cooperation and creativity to children traumatized by war. Mason founded the organization with his own money and got his first donation of $1,000 in 2002, the year after the overthrow of the Taliban in 2001.

During the summer of 2006, a group of 13 MMCC child artists visited Japan to perform and to do crowdfunding by selling photo calendar. In 2013, they held a parade with 100 kids juggling as a pre-event before the eighth annual national juggling championship.At the same year, the organization worked with its local organization, called the Afghan Educational Children's Circus, and attracted 2.7 million people. In 2026, they ran 40 active Social Circus teams in 17 provinces in Afghanistan.

== Operation ==
In its operation, the organization worked from its headquarter in an urban centre in Kabul called the Children’s Culture House where students attended their lessons. But, following the Fall of Kabul, the organization ran the program with a decentralized approach in a few places where they built a few regional centres or semi-permanent centres called Funtainer where the participants could make the program to suit their needs. Following the fall of Kabul, the situation restricted the student's participation because the regime forbade education for female over the age of 12 and affected the lesson in the circus’ programs. There is few place that teach girls from age 8-14, separate girls in separate locations with female trainers, and limit girls to certain activities. There is a case where girls attend the circus activities, but they are arrested, which made their family scared to let them attend the lesson. Funtainer was started in 2008 by modifying shipping containers into a multifunctional performance and rehearsal space which has a colourful setting.
