= Fathali M. Moghaddam =

Iranian-born psychologist

- Education: University of Liverpool; University of Surrey
- Known for: Research on social psychology, cultural psychology and psychology of conflict
- Scientific career
- Fields: Psychology
- Workplaces: Georgetown University; McGill University; United Nations
- Thesis: Social categorisation and intergroup behaviour (1978)

Fathali M. Moghaddam is an Iranian-born psychologist, author, professor of psychology at Georgetown University and director of the Interdisciplinary Program in Cognitive Science (ICOS), Department of Government, Georgetown University.

== Theory and books ==
Moghaddam has proposed that there are two types of behavior: a first that is causally determined and a second that is normatively regulated. The mistake of traditional psychology, and social sciences more broadly, is to try to explain all behavior by applying causal models. He has attempted to demonstrate how causal and normative accounts can combine to create a more complete science of behavior. Second, through concepts such as the embryonic fallacy and interobjectivity, Moghaddam gives priority to collective over individual processes, and argues that personal worldview and identity emerge from collective worldview and identity. This sets him apart from traditional research, which he argued is individualistic and reductionist. Third, Moghaddam has criticized traditional psychology as reflecting the international power structure, with the United States as the only superpower of psychology stamping the discipline with its individualistic, 'self help' ideology. He has criticized what he claims is a 'wholesale' exportation of American psychology to the rest of the world, and argued for the need for an appropriate psychology for the non western world. His concept of double reification describes the process of Western culture being exported to the modern sector of non-Western societies, then being 'discovered' by cross-cultural researchers and reported as a 'universal.'

Moghaddam's work on dictatorship is featured in the TV series, "How to Become a Tyrant," which premiered on Netflix in July, 2021.

== Explaining terrorism ==
Since 9/11, Moghaddam has applied his 'collectivist/normative' approach to explaining radicalization and terrorism in the context of accelerating fractured globalization. His staircase model of terrorism is a concrete outcome of this approach. His solution to radicalization is a new policy to managing intergroup relations, based on his alternative policy of omniculturalism, which focused on human commonalities and rejects both assimilation and multiculturalism. He has also worked to establish an empirical basis for universal human rights, and to explain the rise and fall of dictatorships through his springboard model. His claim is that in terms of personality characteristics, there are potential dictators in all human groups. The key is to understand the conditions that give rise to the springboard, which enables a potential dictator to spring to power.

Although Moghaddam was initially trained as an experimental researcher using the minimal group paradigm (Henri Tajfel was his PhD thesis examiner), he has also used qualitative methods, collaborating with Rom Harré on positioning theory and exploring the role of language in conflicts. His interest in diverse methods have extended to cross-disciplinary interest in psychology and literature. Since 2013 he is the editor of Peace and Conflict: Journal of Peace Psychology.

Since 2010 he has introduced and focused his research on two new concepts. The first is political plasticity, how fast and how much cognition and action in the political domain can change. Limits on political plasticity underlie the failure of political revolutions to create open societies and slow the pace of change toward democracy.

The second new concept is mutual radicalization, the processes through which groups and nations radicalize and push one another to extremes. Drawing from well‑established psychological principles, in his book 'Mutual Radicalization' Moghaddam presents a dynamic, cyclical three‑stage model of mutual radicalization that explains how groups gather under extremist ideologies, establish rigid norms under authoritarian leadership, and develop antagonistic worldviews that exaggerate the threats posed by each other. This process leads to intensifying aggressive actions that can even reach the point of mutual destruction. Moghaddam applies his model to 10 real‑world case studies of mutual radicalization that focus on three main areas: the conflict between Islamist radicals and extreme nationalists in the West; nations that are mired in long-standing hostilities, including North Korea and South Korea; and the increasingly toxic atmosphere in American politics. He offers practical solutions for achieving deradicalization and highlights historical successes, such as German reunification.

== Psychology in Literature ==
In 2021, Moghaddam published a book exploring psychology in Shakespearean plays (Moghaddam, 2021), having published on psychology theory in literature at least once before.

== Bibliography ==
- Moghaddam, F. M. (2027). Theories of intergroup relations: Psychological perspectives in global context. Cambridge University Press.
- Sternberg,R. J., Power, S., & Moghaddam, F. M. (Eds.) (2027). The psychology of serious everyday world problems. Cambridge University Press.
- Moghaddam, F. M., Hendricks, M., & Salas Schweikart, R (2026). The new immigration challenge: A psychological exploration toward solutions. Cambridge University Press.
- Moghaddam, F.M. (2025). Collective irrationality. Springer Nature.
- Moghaddam, F. M. (2024). The psychology of multiculturalism, assimilation, and omniculturalism. Springer Nature.
- Moghaddam, F. M. (2024). The psychology of revolution. New York: Cambridge University Press.
- Moghaddam, F. M. (2023). Political plasticity - the future of democracy and dictatorship. New York: Cambridge University Press.
- Moghaddam, F. M. (2022). How psychologists failed: We neglected the poor and minorities, favored the rich and privileged, and got science wrong. New York: Cambridge University Press.
- Moghaddam, F. M. (2021). Shakespeare and the experimental psychologist. New York: Cambridge University Press.
- Moghaddam, F. M. (2019). Threat to democracy: The appeal of authoritarianism in an age of uncertainty. Washington, D.C.: American Psychological Association Press.
- Moghaddam, F. M. (2018). Mutual radicalization: How groups and nations push one another to extremes. Washington, D.C.: American Psychological Association Press.
- Wagoner, B., Moghaddam, F. M., Valsiner, J. (2018, March) (Eds.).The psychology of radical social change: From rage to revolution. Cambridge, UK.: Cambridge University Press.
- Moghaddam, F. M. (2017). (Ed.). The Sage encyclopedia of political behavior. Vols 1 & 2. London & Thousand Oaks, CA.: Sage.
- Moghaddam, F. M. (2016). The psychology of democracy. Washington, D.C.: American Psychological Association Press.
- Harré, R., & Moghaddam, F. M. (2016) (Eds.). Questioning causality: Scientific explorations of cause and consequence across social contexts. Santa Barbara, CA.: Praeger.
- Harré, R., & Moghaddam, F. M. (Eds.) (2013). The psychology of friendship and enmity: Relationships in love, work, politics, and war. Vol.1: Intrapersonal and interpersonal processes. Praeger: Santa Barbara, CA.
- Harré, R., & Moghaddam, F. M. (Eds.) (2013). The psychology of friendship and enmity: Relationships in love, work, politics, and war. Vol.2: Group and intergroup understanding. Praeger: Santa Barbara, CA.
- Moghaddam, F.M. (2013) The Psychology of Dictatorship. Washington, DC: American Psychological Association (APA).
- Moghaddam, F.M. (2011) терроризм с точки зрения террористob «что они переживают и думают и почему обращаются к насилию [From the Terrorists' Point of View: What They Experience and Why They Come to Destroy]. Westport, CT: Praeger Security International.
- Moghaddam, F. M. (2010) The New Global Insecurity. Westport, CT: Praeger Security International.
- Taylor, D.M. & Moghaddam, F.M. (2010).集団間関係の社会心理学―北米と欧州における理論の系譜と発展 [Theories of Intergroup Relations: International Social Psychological Perspectives]. (2nd Ed.) Westport, CT: Praeger Press. (Original work published 1994.)
- Moghaddam, F. M. (2008). Multiculturalism and Intergroup Relations: Implications for Democracy in Global Context. Washington, DC: American Psychological Association Press.
- Moghaddam, F. M. (2008). How Globalization Spurs Terrorism: The Lopsided Benefits of 'One World' and Why That Fuels Violence. Westport, CT: Praeger Security International.
- Moghaddam, F. M. (2006). From the Terrorists' Point of View: What They Experience and Why They Come to Destroy. Westport, CT: Praeger Security International.
- Lee, Y. T., McCauley, C., Moghaddam, F. M., & Worchel, S. (Eds.) (2004). The Psychology of Ethnic and Cultural Conflict. Westport, CT: Greenwood.
- Moghaddam, F. M., & Marsella, A. J. (2004). Understanding Terrorism: Psychosocial Roots, Consequences, and Interventions (1st ed.). Washington, DC: American Psychological Association.
- Moghaddam, F. M., Taylor, D. M.(1994). Theories of Intergroup Relations: International Social Psychological Perspectives. Second Edition. New York: Praeger. Hardcover & Softcover.
- Moghaddam, F. M., Taylor, D. M.(1987). Theories of Intergroup Relations: International Social Psychological Perspectives. New York: Praeger. Hardcover & Softcover.
- Finkel, N. J., & Moghaddam, F. M. (2005). The Psychology of Rights and Duties: Empirical Contributions and Normative Commentaries. Washington, DC: American Psychological Association.
- Moghaddam, F. M & Harre, R. (2010). Words of Conflict, Words of War: How the Language We Use in Political Processes Sparks Fighting.
- Moghaddam, F. M., Harre, R., & Lee, N. (2007). Global Conflict Resolution through Positioning Analysis. New York, NY: Springer.
- Harre, R., & Moghaddam, F. M. (2003). The Self and Others: Positioning Individuals and Groups in Personal, Political, and Cultural Contexts. Westport, CT.: Praeger.
- Harre, R., & Moghaddam, F. M. Psychology for the Third Millennium: Integrating Cultural and Neuroscience Perspectives. Sage.
- Moghaddam, F. M. (2005). Great Ideas in Psychology: A Cultural and Historical Introduction. Oxford England: Oneworld.
- Moghaddam, F. M. (2002). Psicologia sociale. Bologna: Zanichelli.
- Moghaddam, F. M. (2002). The Individual and Society: A Cultural Integration. New York, NY: Worth Publishers.
- Moghaddam, F. M. (1998). Social Psychology: Exploring Universals across Cultures. New York, NY: W.H. Freeman
- Moghaddam, F. M., & Studer, C. (1998). Illusions of Control: Striving for Control in Our Personal and Professional Lives. Westport, CT: Praeger.
- Moghaddam, F. M. (1997). The Specialized Society: The Plight of the Individual in an Age of Individualism. Westport, CT: Praeger.
- Moghaddam, F. M., Taylor, D. M., & Wright, S. C. (1993). Social Psychology in Cross-Cultural Perspective. New York, NY: W.H. Freeman.
