= Juggling world records =

World records for varieties of juggling

Juggling world records comprise the best performances in the fields of endurance and numbers juggling.

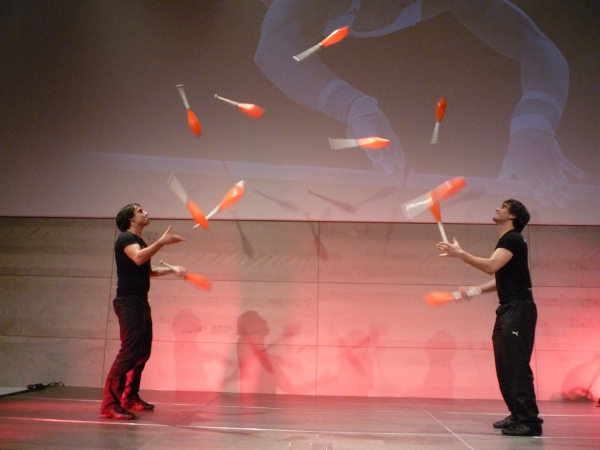
Manuel and Christoph Mitasch, world record-holding club passers.

== Criteria ==
For ratification as a world record, the claimed record

- must be proved by video evidence, either available to the general public or
- must be validated by organizations such as Guinness World Records

Up until 2012 any record must have been proved by either of the two methods above or by video evidence, available to the members of the former Juggling Information Service Committee on Numbers Juggling (JISCON). JISCON is no longer active.

Records begin where each object being juggled has been thrown and successfully caught at least once (e.g. 11 catches of 12 balls is not listed). This is known as a 'flash'. Where each object is thrown and caught more than once the term used is a 'qualify'.

=== Notes on defining the props ===
- Balls, which include beanbags, must be roughly spherical objects.
- Clubs, which include sticks and batons, must be long, roughly cylindrical objects.
- Rings, which include plates and hoops, must be flat, roughly circular objects.
- Bouncing balls must be bounced off a solid, flat, horizontal surface with just one bounce per ball between each throw and catch.

== Solo juggling records ==
Props must be thrown individually from each hand, and counting of catches commences once all props bar one have been thrown. Multiplexing (throwing more than one prop at a time from the same hand) is not allowed. Catches are counted only for throws made while no props have been dropped. According to JISCON definition, a drop is "a failure to catch an object that, as a result, hits the ground or any foreign object. A drop is considered to have happened at the moment the object should have been caught or touched, not when it hits the ground."

=== Balls ===
Equipment	Record	Juggler	Nationality	Year	Ref(s)
14 beanbags	14 catches	Alex Barron	United Kingdom	2017	(Video on YouTube)
13 beanbags	15 catches	Alex Barron	United Kingdom	2013	(Video on YouTube)
13 beanbags	15 catches	Erik Toll	Sweden	2024	(Video on YouTube)
12 beanbags	24 catches	Tom Whitfield	United Kingdom	2025	(Video on YouTube)
11 beanbags	34 catches	Tom Whitfield	United Kingdom	2022	(Video on YouTube)
10 beanbags	51 catches	Tom Whitfield	United Kingdom	2024	(Video on YouTube)
9 balls	55 s	Anthony Gatto	United States	2006	(Video on YouTube)
8 balls	1 min 18 s	Enzo Nicolás Agüero	Argentina	2023	(Video on YouTube)
7 balls	16 min 25 s	Adolfo Esteban Cardenas	Chile	2019	(Video on YouTube)
6 balls	30 min 46 s	Maximilian Kuschmierz	Germany	2023	(Video on YouTube)
5 balls	3 h 44 min 46 s	Bence Ónodi	Hungary	2022	(Video on YouTube)
4 balls	3 h 18 min	Nick Thomas	United States	2026	(Video on YouTube)
3 balls	13 h 10 min	David Rush	United States	2023	Verified by GWR

=== Clubs ===
Equipment	Record	Juggler	Nationality	Year	Ref(s)
9 clubs	13 catches	Eivind Dragsjø	Norway	2026	(Video on Instagram)
8 clubs	20 catches	Moritz Rosner	Germany	2025	(Video on YouTube)
7 clubs	4 min 24 s	Anthony Gatto	United States	2005	(Video on YouTube)
6 clubs	7 min 38 s	Anthony Gatto	United States	2005	(Video on YouTube)
5 clubs	53 min 21 s	Thomas Dietz	Germany	2005	Verified by JISCON
4 clubs	2 h 7 min 17 s	Caio Stevanovich	Brazil	2023	(Video on YouTube)
3 clubs	6 h 11 m 27 s	Andrey Romanenko	Belarus	2025	(Video on YouTube)

=== Rings ===
Equipment	Record	Juggler	Nationality	Year	Ref(s)
13 rings	13 catches	Albert Lucas	United States	2002	(Video on YouTube)
13 rings	13 catches	Danil Lysenko	Ukraine	2024	(Video on YouTube)
12 rings	16 catches	Willy Colombaioni	Italy	2016	(Video on YouTube), (Video on YouTube)
11 rings	21 catches	Danil Lysenko	Ukraine	2020	(Video on YouTube)
10 rings	47 catches	Anthony Gatto	United States	2005	(Video on YouTube)
9 rings	50 s	Anthony Gatto	United States	2005	(Video on YouTube),
8 rings	1 min 17 s	Anthony Gatto	United States	1989	(Video on YouTube),
7 rings	15 min 6 s	Anthony Gatto	United States	2011	(Video on YouTube
6 rings	6 min 55 s	Eivind Dragsjø	Norway	2024	(Video on YouTube)
5 rings	58 min 22 s	Caio Stevanovich	Brazil	2022	(Video on YouTube)
4 rings	1 h 40 min 5 s	Maximilian Kuschmierz	Germany	2022	(Video on YouTube)
3 rings	3 h 10 min 45 s	Maximilian Kuschmierz	Germany	2022	(Video on YouTube)

=== Bouncing ===
Force Bounce

Equipment	Record	Juggler	Nationality	Year	Ref(s)
12 bounce balls	12 catches	Alan Šulc	Czech Republic	2008	(Video on YouTube),
10 bounce balls	10 catches	Alan Šulc	Czech Republic	2008	(Video on YouTube),
10 bounce balls	10 catches	Henrik Veres	Hungary	2013	(Video on YouTube)
10 bounce balls	10 catches	Tony Garcia	Spain	2014	(Video on YouTube)
10 bounce balls	10 catches	David Enoch Sosman	Denmark France	2021	(Video on TikTok)
9 bounce balls	98 catches	Alan Šulc	Czech Republic	2016	(Video on YouTube)
8 bounce balls	4 min 12 s	Alan Šulc	Czech Republic	2011	(Video on YouTube),
7 bounce balls	7 min	Konstantin Kulyak	Russia	2021	(Video on YouTube)
6 bounce balls	5 min 48 s	David Nayer	United States	2016	(Video on YouTube)
5 bounce balls	59 min 30 s	David Nayer	United States	2015	(Video on YouTube)

Lift Bounce

Equipment	Record	Juggler	Nationality	Year	Ref(s)
11 bounce balls	12 catches	Eden Zak	Israel	2014	(Video on YouTube)
10 bounce balls	51 catches	Mathias Ramfelt	Norway	2017	(Video on Vimeo)
9 bounce balls	40 s	Mathias Ramfelt	Norway	2017	(Video on Vimeo)
8 bounce balls	1 min 14 s	Tyron Colombaioni	Italy	2016	(Video on Facebook)
7 bounce balls	11 min 20 s	Tyron Colombaioni	Italy	2016	(Video on YouTube)
6 bounce balls	6 min 43 s	Philippe Dupuis	Canada	2016	(Video on YouTube)
5 bounce balls	56 min 09 s	Liam Ryan-O'Flaherty	United States	2019	(Video on YouTube)
4 bounce balls	2 hour 0 min 01 s	Bill Coad	United States	2019	(Video on YouTube)
3 bounce balls	3 hours 45 min 13 s	Bill Coad	United States	2019	(Video on YouTube)

== Passing records ==
When passing, only the props thrown between two separate jugglers are counted. In some patterns (ultimates or one-count) all the throws are caught by the opposite juggler but in other patterns each juggler makes some throws to themselves. The reason for excluding self throws is that two jugglers could make a single pass to their partner and then go on to juggle solo patterns for as long as they wanted therefore undermining the record for 'passing'.

=== Balls ===
Equipment	Record	Juggler	Nationality	Year	Ref(s)
22 balls	22 passes	Tom Whitfield & Dan Wood; Tom Whitfield & Dave Leahy	United Kingdom	2018; 2019	(Video on YouTube) (Video on YouTube)
21 balls	21 passes	Dave Leahy; Dan Wood	United Kingdom	2014	(Video on YouTube)
20 balls	27 passes	Tom Whitfield; Dan Wood	United Kingdom	2019	(Video on YouTube)
19 balls	25 passes	Tom Whitfield; Dan Wood	United Kingdom	2019	(Video on YouTube)
18 balls	29 passes	Tom Whitfield; Dave Leahy	United Kingdom	2019	(Video on YouTube)
17 balls	39 passes	Tom Whitfield; Dave Leahy	United Kingdom	2019	(Video on YouTube)
16 balls	47 passes	Peter Kaseman; Doug Sayers	United States	2015	(Video on YouTube)
15 balls	91 passes	Peter Kaseman; Doug Sayers	United States	2012	(Video on YouTube)
14 balls	22 seconds (195 passes)	Peter Kaseman; Doug Sayers	United States	2012	(Video on YouTube), (Note: In 2012, Chris Hodge and Andrew Hodge set the 14 ball passing record for a 2-count pattern. The 199 catches mentioned in that video include self-throws (an alternate counting method used by the IJA).)
13 balls	54 seconds (475 passes)	Ori Roth; Ofek Snir	Israel	2016	(Video on YouTube)
12 balls	1 min 38 s (475 passes)	Daniel Ledel; Luca Pferdmenges	Austria; Germany	2017	(Video on YouTube)
11 balls	5 min 5 s (1506 passes)	Daniel Ledel; Luca Pferdmenges	Austria; Germany	2018	(Video on YouTube)

=== Clubs ===
Equipment	Record	Juggler	Nationality	Year	Ref(s)
15 clubs	15 passes	Kaito Tanioka; Kento Tanioka	Japan	2021	(Video on Instagram)
14 clubs	32 passes	Dominik Harant; Manuel Mitasch	Austria	2020	(Video on YouTube)
13 clubs	31 s (102 passes)	Dominik Harant; Manuel Mitasch	Austria	2022	(Video on YouTube)
12 clubs	28 s (101 passes)	Daniel Ledel; Manuel Mitasch	Austria	2016	(Video on YouTube)
11 clubs	1 min 17 s (246 passes)	Julius Preu; Daniel Ledel	Germany; Austria	2022	(Video on YouTube)
10 clubs	4 min 00 s (808 passes)	Dominik Harant; Daniel Ledel	Austria	2017	(Video on YouTube)
9 clubs	7 min 1 s (1392 passes)	Christoph Mitasch; Manuel Mitasch	Austria	2007	(Video on YouTube)

=== Rings ===
Equipment	Record	Juggler	Nationality	Year	Ref(s)
18 rings	19 passes	Dominik Harant; Manuel Mitasch	Austria	2015	(Video on YouTube).
17 rings	21 passes	Dominik Harant; Manuel Mitasch	Austria	2020	(Video on YouTube)
16 rings	32 passes	Dominik Harant; Manuel Mitasch	Austria	2020	(Video on YouTube)
15 rings	52 passes	Thomas Dietz; Dominik Harant	Germany; Austria	2018	(Video on Instagram)
14 rings	59 passes	Dominik Harant; Manuel Mitasch	Austria	2013	(Video on YouTube)
13 rings	23 seconds (171 passes)	Thomas Dietz; Dominik Harant	Germany; Austria	2015	(Video on YouTube)
12 rings	1 min 22 seconds (300 passes)	Dominik Harant; Manuel Mitasch	Austria	2020	(Video on YouTube)
11 rings	2 min 44 s (1201 passes)	Thomas Dietz; Dominik Harant	Germany; Austria	2015	(Video on YouTube)
