= Pferdmenges =

Pferdmenges is a surname. Notable people with the surname include:

- Luca Pferdmenges (born 2001), German juggler
- Robert Pferdmenges (1880–1962), German banker and politician
