= Berousek family =

Czech circus performer family

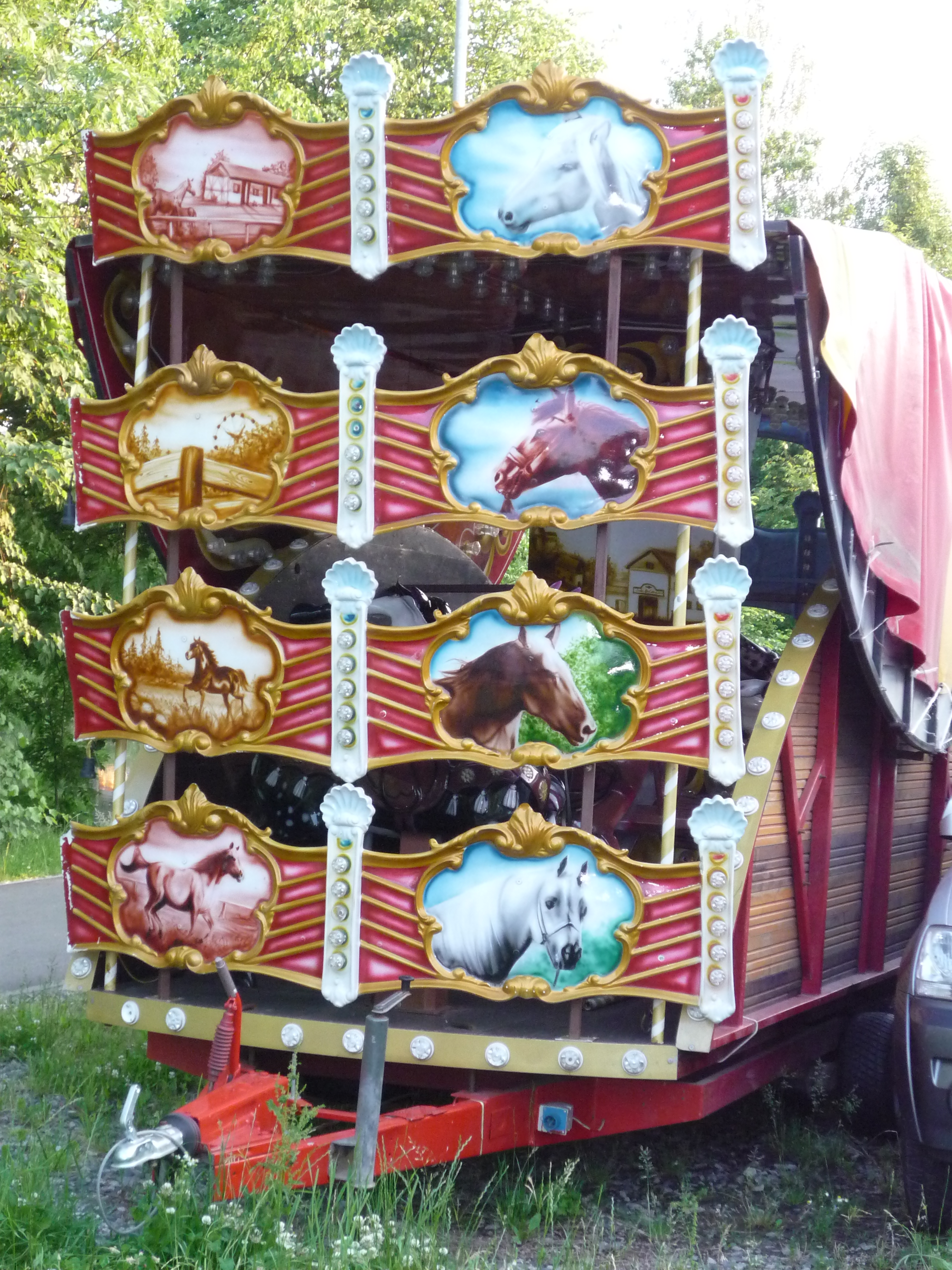
Cirkus Berousek horse stall in Havlíčkův Brod

The Berousek family is a Czech family, originally from Vilémov, with members who have been circus performers for two centuries. Skills include comedy, puppetry, acrobatics, equestrianism, bear training, tight rope walking, and juggling.

Berousek's dynasty dates back to 1756 when the family appeared in Vilémov. The first performer from the family was Josef Berousek.

The Cirkus Berousek was founded around 1920 in Bohemia by fourth generation Hynek Ignac Berousek, then taken over by his son Antonin Berousek and renamed Circus Central, and then nationalized in 1951.

== Alan Šulc ==
Alan Šulc (born 1990 in Prague, Czech Republic) is a world record–holding juggler. He is best known for his bounce juggling and using Irish dancing steps in his juggling performance. He started juggling at the age of five and gave his first live performance at eight years old.

Šulc holds the following awards:

- Gold medal at the European Youth Circus Festival in 2002.
- Bronze Clown at the 28th International Circus Festival of Monte-Carlo in 2004.
- Gold medal at the 9th International Circus Festival of Warsaw in 2004.

Šulc holds the following world records in solo force bounce juggling:

- 12 bounce balls for 12 catches in 2008.
- 10 bounce balls for 10 catches in 2008.
- 9 bounce balls for 62 catches in 2008.
- 8 bounce balls for 4 min 12 sec in 2011.

== Bobby Berosini ==
Bohumil Berousek, known professionally as Bobby Berosini is a Czech-born American entertainer best known for his long-running show involving live orangutans.

Berosini emigrated from Czechoslovakia in 1964, and eventually made his way to Las Vegas. He was a fixture at the Stardust Resort & Casino starting in the mid-1970s, and his act was featured in Going Ape!, a 1981 comedy film starring Tony Danza and Danny DeVito. Earlier, in 1978, one of his orangutans, Manis, appeared as Clyde in Every Which Way but Loose with Clint Eastwood.

In 1989 a Stardust dancer secretly videotaped Berosini grabbing, slapping, punching and shaking his orangutans before going on stage with them. The dancer, Ottavio Gesmundo, sent the tapes to People for the Ethical Treatment of Animals, and the resulting outcry forced the Stardust to cancel Berosini's act for a few days. He returned to star in the "Lido de Paris" at the Stardust until it closed in 1991 and then starred in the resort's "Enter the Night" for several years. Although he later moved his act to Branson, Missouri, he has only made sporadic appearances in Las Vegas since then. The United States Fish and Wildlife Service later canceled Berosini's wildlife permit.

Berosini sued Gesmundo, PETA and another animal rights group, the Performing Animal Welfare Society, for defamation and invasion of privacy. In 1990, a jury found in favor of Berosini and awarded him $3.1 million in damages. However, the Nevada Supreme Court threw out the judgment in 1994, saying that the tape was an accurate portrayal of Berosini's behavior and fell within the realm of "protected opinion." It also ruled that Berosini had no expectation of privacy in the crowded backstage area.

This judgment was affirmed on a rehearing of the case a year later, and in 1996, a Nevada District Court judge ordered Berosini to pay a total of $417,000 in attorneys' fees to PETA and PAWS.

PETA subsequently alleged that Berosini had moved more than $2 million out of the country to avoid paying court costs. Berosini and his wife, Joan, claimed that the money was for a land investment in Central and South America. In February 2000, a federal magistrate ordered Berosini to return the money, finding that Berosini was deliberately hiding his assets. Berosini and PETA agreed to a settlement in which Berosini paid $340,000 in court costs and interest. However, two years later, Berosini was ordered to pay three law firms $250,000 for the time they spent trying to find the $2 million. Berosini contested this judgment four times on appeal and lost each time, and PETA claims that it is considering further legal action against Berosini for filing a frivolous appeal.

Berosini told Harper's Magazine in 1993 that he and his wife received numerous death threats against themselves and their orangutans in the middle of the night. He also said he had to shop at a different supermarket every day for several months due to threats that the orangutans' food would be poisoned.

== Mario Berousek ==
Mario Berousek (born 14 October 1974 in Prague, Czech Republic) is the fastest club juggler in the world and a world record holding juggler. His parents are Ferdinand Berousek and Sonja born Berousek, known as "Fredys". His wife Andrea, born Janecek, is a granddaughter of Bohumil Berousek, known as Berossini. Mario's brother is Robert Berousek. Mario and Andrea's children are: Sharon, Vanessa, Nicole, Priscilla, Mario-Ignacio Berousek. Berousek started juggling at the age of 9 and gave his first live performance at the age of 10.

Mario holds the following awards:

- Silver medal at the 20th Festival de Demain Paris in 1997
- Special Prize at the 23rd International Circus Festival in Monte Carlo in 1999

Mario held the following world records:

- 5 clubs 50 cm high, 240 catches in 1 minute in Hannover in 2000
- 3 clubs 20 cm high, 171 catches in 48 seconds in Hannover in 2000
- 5 clubs with the highest number of rotations whilst juggling for one minute (735 ×) at the Moulin Rouge, Paris in 2010
- 5 clubs with the highest number of juggling catches in 30 seconds (128) at the Moulin Rouge, Paris in 2010

TV and charity:

- On 14 July 2000 Berousek appeared as a special guest at a Joe Cocker concert in Bocholt.
- Twice a performer in Le plus grand cabaret du monde.
- Berousek appeared on a TV show RTL Kochprofis 2005.
- From 2009 till 2012 Berousek was juggling at the Moulin Rouge.
- Gala Event for Formula 1 in Sporting Club Monaco 2014.
- Charity - Berousek supported "Krebs kranke Kinder" (Children with cancer) in Hannover in November 2002. In Paris in June 2012 he supported Lee-Ann Watson - BAN South Africa at the clinic for children with HIV in South Africa. In February 2014 supported help raise funds for biological water purifier for the Hospital in Africa at the 3rd Social evening in the "Golden Prague", Vinoř.
