= JIS =

JIS may refer to:

== Standards ==
- Japanese Industrial Standards
  - JIS screw drive
  - JIS semiconductor designation
  - JIS encoding
  - Shift JIS

== Organisations ==
- Japanese international school
- Jabriya Indian School, Kuwait
- Jakarta International School, Indonesia
- Jamaica Information Service
- Jeddah International School, Saudi Arabia
- Jerudong International School, Brunei
- JIS University, India
- JIS College of Engineering, India

== Places ==
- Jakarta International Stadium, stadium in Jakarta
  - Jakarta International Stadium railway station, an adjacent railway station to the north
  - Jakarta International Stadium (Transjakarta), an adjacent Transjakarta bus station to the west

== Other uses ==
- Juggling Information Service, a website
- Just in sequence, an inventory strategy
- Journal of Integer Sequences
- Japanese Instrument of Surrender signed September 2, 1945
