= Anthony Gatto =

American juggler (born 1973)

- Born: Anthony Commarota; April 14, 1973 (age 53); Manhattan, New York
- Occupations: Juggler; entrepreneur

Anthony Gatto (born Anthony Commarota on April 14, 1973) is an American juggler who is widely considered the greatest technical juggler of all time. He began performing in Las Vegas at the age of ten. He holds several world records in juggling.

== Early years ==
Born in Manhattan and growing up in Ellicott City, Maryland, he learned to juggle at the age of 3, taught by his stepfather, Nick Gatto, a retired Vaudeville performer. By age 5, his skills had exceeded his father's. He was a juggling prodigy: world-class by the age of nine, when he won a gold medal at Circus Mondial in Paris.

He made his first television appearance at the age of 8 on the program That's Incredible! At the age of 13, he came in third place in the individual competition at the 39th annual convention of the International Jugglers Association. Anthony Gatto appeared on The Tonight Show in 1985. His family moved to Las Vegas when he was 14 in order to take advantage of the career opportunities located there.

== Adult career ==
In 1998, Gatto met his future wife Danielle, who became his assistant during his performances. A professional dancer, Danielle added circus-style skills to her résumé to accompany her husband on circus tours. Danielle and Anthony married in 1999 and they have two children.

Gatto performed in Midnight Fantasy when it premiered in 1999. As he performed largely without speaking, he quickly juggled hula hoops, swiftly thrown clubs, and balls aimed for baskets. Joe Delaney of the Las Vegas Sun said that the audience most liked the part of the show where Gatto juggled.

In 2000, he became the first and so far only juggler to win the prestigious Golden Clown award at the 24th International Circus Festival of Monte-Carlo. Between 2007 and 2009, Gatto's performance was a part of Cirque du Soleil's show Koozå. From 2010 to 2012, he was part of Cirque du Soleil's show La Nouba.

In 2010 he performed on season 7 of the Ellen Show.

In 2012, Anthony Gatto retired from performing in Cirque Du Soleil in order to run a concrete resurfacing business "Big Top Concrete Resurfacing LLC" under his birth name of Anthony Commarota. The business was founded by him in August 2012 and is located in Orlando, Florida.

== Skills ==
Gatto formerly shared the record for most rings juggled and caught at least once. He currently holds the following 7 juggling world records:

Rings

- 7 rings for 15 minutes 5 seconds in 2011.
- 8 rings for 1 minute 17 seconds in 1989.
- 9 rings for 235 catches in 2005.
- 10 rings for 47 catches in 2005.

Clubs

- 6 clubs for 7 minutes 38 seconds in 2005.
- 7 clubs for 4 minutes 24 seconds in 2005.

Balls

- 9 balls for 54 seconds in 2006.

== See also ==
- List of jugglers
