= Juggling Information Service =

Website

The Juggling Information Service or JIS is a website with the goal of being, "the primary informational resource on the subject of juggling." Launched in 1994, the free information service is a successor to the FTP juggling archive at Indiana University. The website is maintained by five people in various locations, primarily Barry Bakalor.

JIS runs pages dedicated to juggling festivals and conventions, a hall of fame, pictures, videos, news, jugglers' groups, websites, "as well as almost any other juggling need." JIS also has a Juggling Information Service Committee on Numbers Juggling (JISCON), the members of which maintain juggling records, proof of which must be available to the general public or to the members. JIS also makes available Juggler's World, the publication of the International Jugglers' Association.

JIS has been described providing, "friendly advice and information for jugglers at all levels."
