= Thom Wall =

American juggler

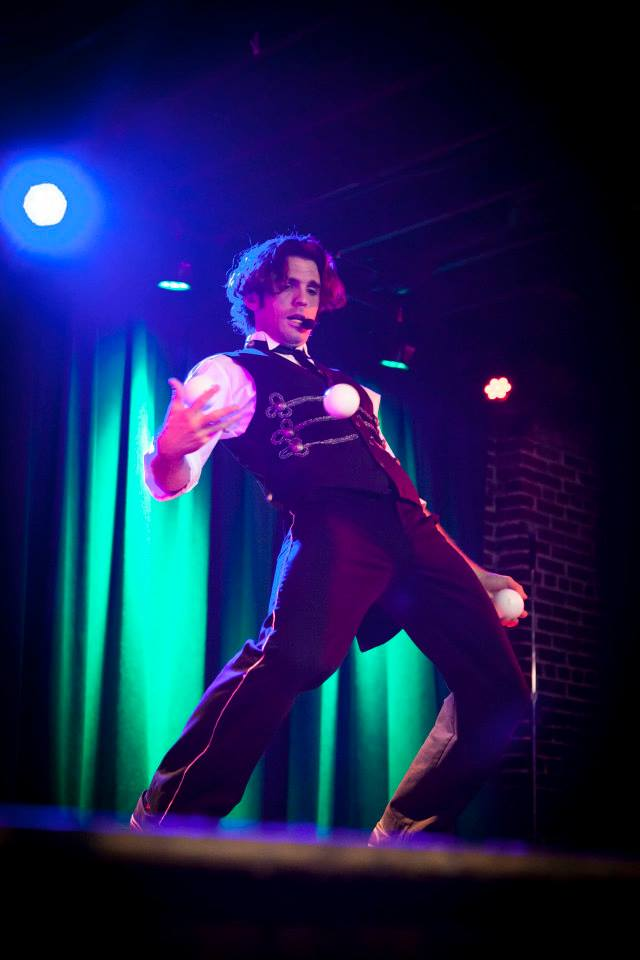
Thom Wall - Saint Louis Juggler - Performs at Blueberry Hill - The Duck Room - August 2013

Thom Wall (born February 9, 1987) is an American juggler and variety entertainer from Saint Louis, Missouri, US. NPR has called him "one of the world's most notable jugglers."

Wall is known for his avant-garde performance style, cultivated through training at the New England Center for Circus Arts, lessons with mime Karen Montanaro, and training with long-time friend Curtis Carlyle. In 2009, Wall competed at the World Juggling Federation's "Winter Blitz" event. No judge had seen any of his creative five-ball tricks performed before, so his routine was deemed unscoreable. In 2017, the Smithsonian Institution called Thom an "elite practitioner of the craft of juggling."

Thom is one of the last gentleman jugglers performing in the world today - a performance style where relatable objects are manipulated in clever ways. His work with mouthstick and balance have given him a notoriety in the circus world, often being referred to as "one of the world's top jugglers". In 2015, Dr. Salvador Calva Morales, chancellor of La Universidad Mesoamericana in Puebla, Mexico - home to Mexico's traditional circus school - was quoted as saying "...I dare say that [Thom] is the greatest balancer in the entire world." In 2017, Smithsonian Magazine referred to Thom as "...an elite practitioner of the craft of juggling." NPR has called Wall "...one of the world's most notable jugglers."

In November 2017, Thom married fellow circus performer Chloe Somers, who worked with Thom to revive and popularize the old circus discipline of "bottle walking" in the United States. The two separated in 2019, when Somers signed a contract with The Seven Fingers.

Thom left Cirque du Soleil's show Totem after its premiere at London's Royal Albert Hall in January, 2019, to pursue work on cruise ships. He was quoted as saying "My time here has been amazing, but 1,500 shows is... yeah, that's enough for me. Maybe I'll come back, but it's not in my plans for the immediate future." He worked for Cirque du Soleil as a headline act from 2014 through 2019. Wall now lives in Philadelphia, Pennsylvania, where he teaches Circus History and Career Planning at Circadium: School of Contemporary Circus.

In the fall of 2021, Wall joined Cirque Mechanics' revamp of their flagship show Birdhouse Factory.

In 2022, Thom returned to working as a headline entertainer for Royal Caribbean Cruise Lines.

== Career highlights ==
In 2014, Thom competed at the International Jugglers' Association (IJA) Senior Stage Championships with a traditional mouthstick juggling act. This act was awarded the bronze medal, making it the first time the discipline has been awarded a competition medal in the championships' 67-year history.

Thom was hired by Cirque du Soleil in April 2014 (to replace juggler, Greg Kennedy) in their touring show Totem. He worked for the company in a temporary position, performing shows in America, Canada and New Zealand before being replaced by Chris Chiappini in September 2014. Thom was then rehired by Cirque in February 2016 as a last-minute replacement for the Japan tour - this was possibly the fastest re-integration ever into a Cirque du Soleil show, as Thom was given eight hour's notice before catching a flight to Tokyo. After the Japanese tour ended in the summer of 2017, he signed a full- time contract with the company as their permanent juggling act. He performed with the show through their European tour in 2019 before moving on to work for Royal Caribbean International as a guest entertainer, performing his own show on cruise ships.

In 2013, Thom was the first person to ever juggle six knives.

In 2014, Thom and Benjamin Domask debuted their new creation "The Dinner and a Show Show" at the Kansas City Fringe Festival, where it received top honors.

In 2015, Thom joined the Celebration Barn Theater's new performance ensemble in their creation of "Traveling Light."

In 2017, Thom was the face of the American juggling tradition at the 50th annual Smithsonian Folklife Festival in Washington, D.C., where he hosted panel discussions and performed a daily lecture and demonstration of the history of juggling. The show he presented there, called On the Topic of Juggling has been referred to as "part stand up comedy, part TedX, and part juggling show."

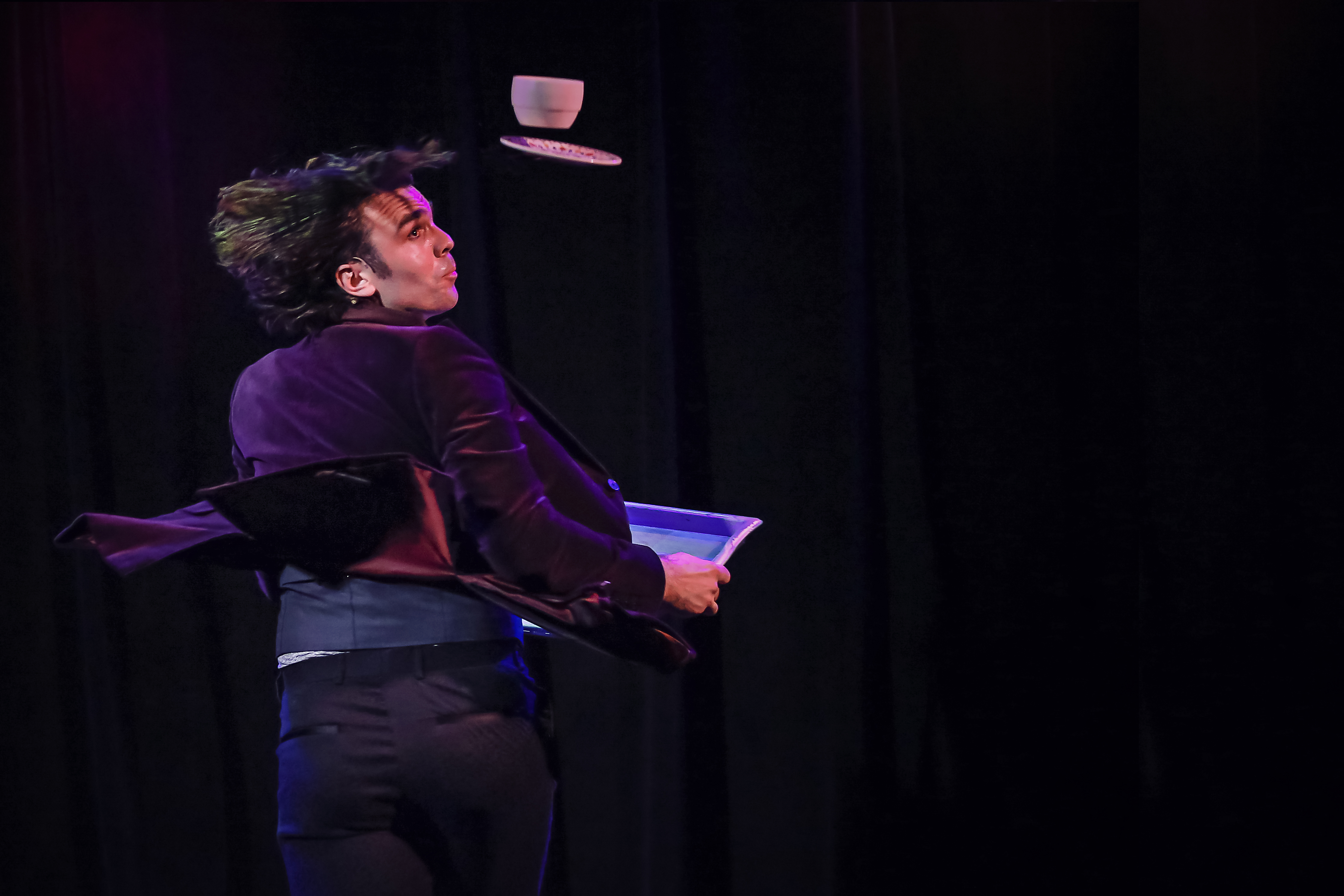
Thom Wall performs a "gentleman" juggling act.

Also in 2017, one of the glasses from Thom's mouthstick act was inducted into the Museum of Historical Juggling Props in Middletown, Ohio. Museum curator, David Cain, reflected on the induction of this gentleman juggler's props by saying "Thom is one of the brightest stars in the juggling world. He has a wide array of skills but what he is known for few people (jugglers) do."

In 2018, Drexel University named Thom one of their "40 under 40" - recognizing him as one of the university's most promising alumni thanks to his work in the circus arts and American nonprofit arts community.

In 2019, his book Juggling - From Antiquity to the Middle Ages was published, reaching #1 on Amazon's charts for Theater History & Criticism the day of release. Three months after the book's release, its eBook format was awarded "Best Nonfiction Book of 2019" by the Next Generation Indie Book Awards.

In 2021, Wall joined the Board of Directors of the Celebration Barn Theater, one of the premier physical comedy schools in the world.

In 2021, Wall was awarded the International Jugglers' Association's "Excellence in Education Award". Thom was the 18th honoree with this title in the organization's 74-year history, and the youngest to receive this lifetime achievement honor.

In 2022, Wall was named a "distinguished alumni" from his high school, Ladue Horton Watkins High School in St Louis, Missouri, for his work in the performing arts, alongside internationally renowned pianist Ingrid Jacoby.

In 2024, Wall was awarded the American Youth Circus Organization / American Circus Educators (AYCO/ACE) "Innovation in Education" award for "exponentially advancing circus education" through his publishing efforts.

== Juggling - From Antiquity to the Middle Ages ==
In 2019, Wall published the book Juggling - From Antiquity to the Middle Ages: the forgotten history of throwing and catching with the imprint Modern Vaudeville Press. This book "...is an attempt to catalogue this tangible history of juggling in human culture. It is the story of juggling, represented in art and writing from around the world, across time," filling a large gap in the literature surrounding circus arts, juggling, and theater. The book is a departure from his show and lecture at the Smithsonian Institution's annual Folklife Festival. The book is currently used as a course material in anthropology classes at a number of universities in the USA.

Circus Report magazine called the book "the most important literature review to exist in the community of juggling," a point which many other reviewers have echoed. Three months after the book's release, its eBook edition was awarded "Best Nonfiction Book of 2019" by the Next Generation Indie Book Awards.

The Spanish translation was released in October, 2020 in both electronic and physical formats.

== Juggling: What It Is and How to Do It ==
Wall's second literary endeavor, Juggling: What It Is and How to Do It - A not-so-brief guide to the world's most underrated pastime, was published on August 31, 2020, by Modern Vaudeville Press. This book is an in-depth guide to juggling fundamentals, and has been called "one of the top ten instruction books ever written." The book reached Amazon bestseller status before publication. It was also a finalist in the 2021 Next Generation Indie Book Awards "Novelty and Gift" category. The title is currently being used as a course text in occupational therapy programs across the USA.

== Education ==
Wall attended Washington University in St. Louis, where he earned a degree in Germanic Languages and Literatures under Herr Dr. Paul Michael Lützeler. He was drawn to Washington University due to its "robust language offerings" across a variety of linguistic families. In his time there, he studied Spanish, Portuguese, German, Arabic, ESL, and illustration and design. He speaks Spanish and Arabic and has taught workshops in both languages, and holds teaching credentials from Cambridge University.

He also holds a master's degree in Nonprofit Arts Administration from Drexel University. His thesis revolved around the branding of nonprofit circus organizations in the United States.

Thom was a member of the 2012 Professional Development Program at the New England Center for Circus arts, where he trained juggling and hoop diving.

== Community service ==
Wall served on the board of directors of the International Jugglers' Association between 2009 and 2013. During his tenure on the board of directors, he helped found the a new international competition format, helped implement eJuggle, the IJA's electronic magazine, and started the IJA's annual Video Tutorial Contest, which has brought hundreds of hours of high-quality, free-to-access juggling tutorials to the internet.

Wall is widely credited by members of the juggling community with helping turn the International Jugglers' Association around - when he was first elected to the board of directors, the organization was in the middle of a public relations crisis on the usenet forum Rec.Juggling. His work with online educational programs, global outreach, and benefits to new members through the new online magazine has brought the 70-year-old organization many new members, much new respect, and financial solvency.

His work with the International Jugglers' Association inspired him to pursue a master's degree in Nonprofit Arts Administration through Drexel University. In a 2012 interview, Thom's primary interests in arts administration were cited to be strategic planning, PR, and marketing.

In 2020, Wall was made an MLA Field Bibliographer, helping the organization cultivate its inaugural Circus Arts bibliography.

Wall has coached a number of notable jugglers throughout their careers, including Sam Malcolm, Benjamin Domask, and Tony Steinbach.

In 2021, Wall was awarded the "Excellence in Education" award by the International Jugglers' Association. The occasion was recognized by the state of Pennsylvania, with senators Bob Casey (D) and Patrick Toomey (R) raising the US flag over the Capitol Building to mark the honor on different days. Senator Bob Casey was recorded explaining his decision: "[We raised the flag] to honor Thomas Wall - an academic and circus performer who works to preserve American Performing Arts history. This [award] is a lifetime achievement." Wall was the 28th person to receive the accolade since the organization's inception in 1947.

When asked about his work with Modern Vaudeville Press, Wall states "I'm just grateful to preserve people's life's work." He also makes a point of donating books whenever he performs shows for schools and other community-driven organizations.

Wall has been a member of the board of directors of the Celebration Barn Theater since 2021.

== International Recognition ==
In 2014, Wall competed at the Zelta Karlis circus festival in Riga, Latvia. He was presented with the "People's Choice" special prize, given to the act found "...most pleasurable to the Latvian people."

In 2015, Wall was invited to perform at the 3rd annual Festival Universario de Circo, circus festival held at La Universidad Mesoamericana, which is home to the Mexico's traditional circus school, in Puebla, Mexico. At the culmination of the festival, he was presented with the Crotalus Scholaris Medal - the highest award the university offers. Chancellor Salvador Calva Morales stated that the award was to "indelibly recognize Thomas Wall's work as a juggler."

In 2017, Wall was invited to teach a fifteen-hour masterclass workshop at the Periplo International Circus Festival in Guadalajara, Mexico. He also debuted his new one-man show On the Topic of Juggling at the event.

In 2019, Wall was invited to the Zelka circus festival in Lublin, Poland to present On the Topic of Juggling at the country's national juggling festival.

In 2021, Wall was awarded the "Excellence in Education" award by the International Jugglers' Association.

In 2024, Wall was awarded the "Innovation in Education" award by the American Youth Circus Organization / American Circus Educators.

== Awards ==
- "Innovation in Education" - American Youth Circus Organization / American Circus Educators - 2024.
- "Distinguished Alumni" - Ladue Horton Watkins High School - 2022.
- "Excellence in Education" award - International Jugglers' Association
- Best Nonfiction Book of 2019 - Next Generation Indie Book Awards (ebook)
- Top 40 Jugglers of the Year 2019 (#26)
- 40 under 40 - Drexel University
- Top 40 Jugglers of the Year 2018 (#30)
- Top 40 Jugglers of the Year 2017 (#20)
- 1st place, three ring juggling world championships (International Jugglers' Association, 2017)
- 3rd place, three ball juggling world championships (International Jugglers' Association, 2017)
- Top 40 Jugglers of the Year 2016 (#30)
- Crotalus Scholaris Medal - Universidad Mesoamericana (Puebla, Mexico)
- Top 40 Jugglers of the Year 2015 (#31)
- People's Choice - Riga International Circus Festival (Riga, Latvia, 2015)
- Top 40 Jugglers of the Year 2014 (#22)
- Top 40 Jugglers of the Year 2013 (#27)
- 3rd place, World Juggling Championships (International Juggers' Association, 2014)
- Best of the Fringe, "the 'Dinner and a Show' Show" (Kansas City Fringe Festival 2014)
- Judy Finelli Award for "Most Inspirational Juggler of the Year" (Humboldt Circus, 2013)
- Top 40 Jugglers of the Year 2012 (#23)
- 2nd place, World Juggling Championships (International Jugglers' Association, 2012)
- Top 40 Jugglers of the Year 2011 (#31)
- 1st place, three ball juggling world championships (International Jugglers' Association, 2011)
- 2nd place, three-person team club passing with teammates Peter Kaseman and Doug Sayers (International Jugglers' Association, 2011)
- Top 40 Jugglers of the Year 2010 (#24)
- 1st place, three ball juggling world championships (International Jugglers' Association, 2010)
- Winner, eXtreme Juggling competition, four ball category (International Jugglers' Association, 2010)
- 1st place, three-person team club passing with teammates Peter Kaseman and Doug Sayers (International Jugglers' Association, 2010)
- 2nd place, three-person team club passing with teammates Peter Kaseman and Alan Thompson (International Jugglers' Association, 2009)
- 1st place, three-person team club passing with teammates Alan Thompson and Carey Wagoner (International Jugglers' Association, 2008)
