= Popovich Comedy Pet Theater =

Comedy show with both animal and human performers

The Popovich Comedy Pet Theater (also known as the Pet Travel Show Inc.) is a show combining animal and human performers. They perform comedy routines through a variety of skits that include clowns, acrobatics, juggling, and stunts under the direction of Gregory Popovich, the show’s creator.

== Acts and stunts ==
Acts include pet fire marshals, dog football, Dr. Doolittle, and funny geese. Stunts include cats and dogs walking tight ropes, balancing on metallic balls, jumping through hoops, jumping rope, using scooters and playing football.

Animals: Lisa (geese), Jennifer (geese), Gabriella (dog), Robbie (dog), Maia (dog), Taylor (cat), Mia (dog), Giselle (parrot), Mabel (dog), Kevin (dog), Jenna (cat), Lily (cat), Lauren (dog), Sofia (dog), Tessa (dog), Keemia (cat), Olivia (cat), Kurt (goat), Helgo (goat), Mr. Diamond (miniature horse), Evie (dog), Kelsie (cat), Jordan (cat), Emily (dog), Talia (dog), Lola (dog), Harper (cat), Elena (cat), Georgie (dog), Brittany (dog).

== Tour locations ==
This show has performed in various countries including France, Germany, the Netherlands, Belgium, Israel, Chile, Colombia, Mexico, Venezuela, and Canada. Additionally, the show was performed in US cities including New York, Los Angeles, San Francisco, Boston, Chicago, Memphis and Miami in addition to Las Vegas.

== See also ==
- Animal Show
- Comedy
- Dog Sports

== Other sources ==
- Edson, Lauren. "Popovich Combines Human and Animal Comedy on Stage." News, Sports and Weather for Boise, ID| Idaho Statesman & IdahoStatesman.com. N. p., n. d. Web. 30 Sept. 2013. http://www.idahostatesman.com/2012/12/14/2380565/theater-thats-gone-to-the-dogs.html
- “Popovich Comedy Pet Theater is a circus show that’s gone to the dogs...and cats.” The Huntsville Times. N. p. 15 Apr. 2013: Print.http://www.al.entertainment/index.sst/2013/04.comedy.pet.theater-Weekly.pet
- "So Much More than a Pet Show – Entertainment – Montgomery News." Montgomery Media. N.p., 11 Feb. 2013: Print.http://www.montgomerynews.com/articles/2013/02/11/entertainment/doc5111408640ad3147942056.txt?viewmode=fullstory>.
- NY Times: https://www.nytimes.com/2013/03/22/nyregion/popovich-comedy-pet-theater-coming-to-tribeca-arts-center.html?emc=eta1
- USA Today: http://usatoday30.usatoday.com/life/lifestyle/pets/2009-10-04-cat-trainer_N.htm
- LA Times: http://www.comedypet.com/oldwebsite/newimages/LA-Times-FullSz.jpg
- People Magazine: http://www.people.com/people/archive/article/0,,20129992,00.html
- LV Weekly: http://www.lasvegasweekly.com/as-we-see-it/weekly-qa/2013/aug/06/gregory-popovich-pet-retirement-and-how-train-cat/#/0
- Popovich and the Voice of the Fabled American West: Film Threat: https://www.filmthreat.com/reviews/79057/
- Austin Chronicle: https://www.austinchronicle.com/daily/screens/2014-10-27/austin-film-festival-popovich-and-the-voice-of-the-fabled-american-west/
- LV Weekly: https://www.lasvegasweekly.com/ae/film/2014/jun/04/thompson-brothers-popovich-film
