= Knife juggling =

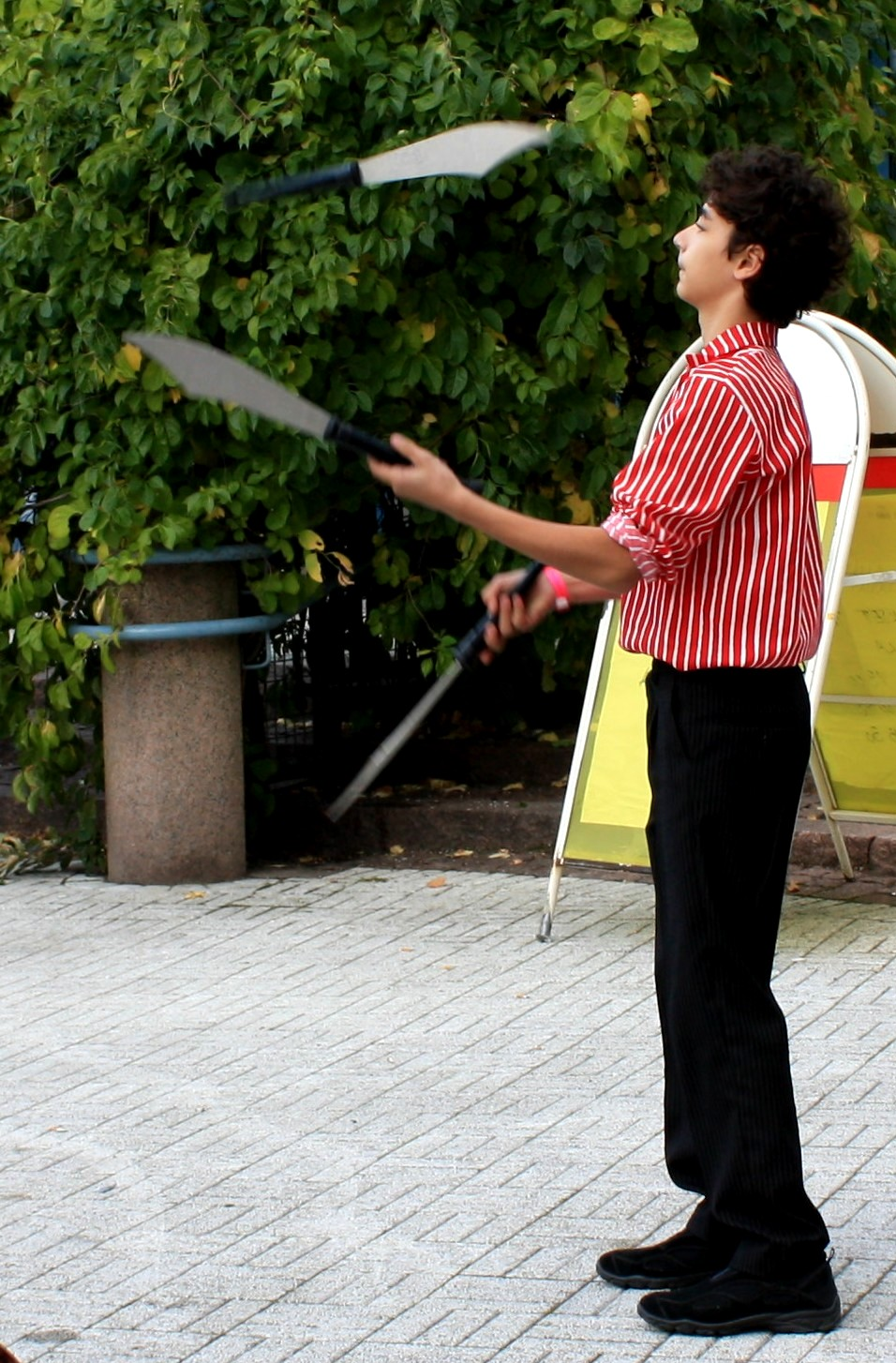
A knife juggler

Knife juggling is a variant of toss juggling using blunt knives as props which are thrown and caught. Although knives are sometimes juggled recreationally, it is generally a performance art. Knife juggling is typically seen performed by street entertainers as part of a routine, or at art or historical festivals.

The knives are thrown with vertical spin, lending them stability in the air, and are typically allowed to rotate once or twice before being caught. Knife juggling can be performed with any number of objects, but the vast majority of performers use three knives. Patterns used are usually basic and consist solely of a cascade, and sometimes involve simple juggling tricks such as an under the leg throw. This is due to the unwieldy nature and increased weight of knives and the increased level of danger when compared to such props as juggling clubs.

== Knives used ==
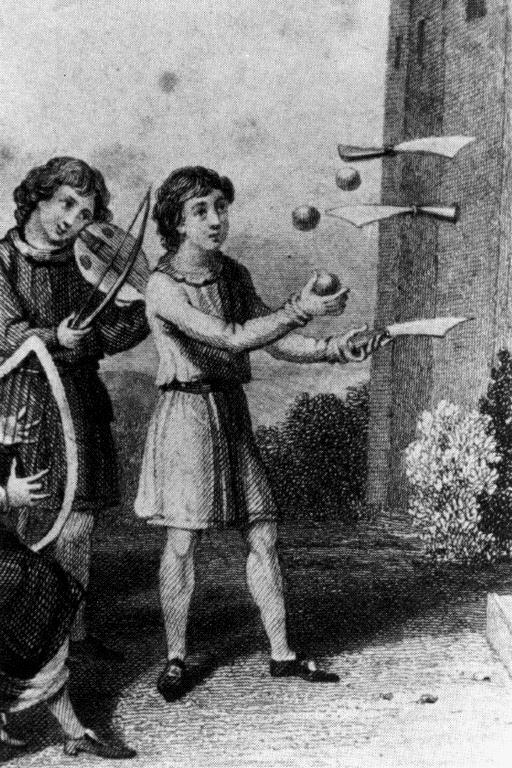
Juggling with balls and knives (circa 18th century)

Juggling is rarely performed with sharp knives, because there is little point in increasing the risk to performer for no aesthetic benefit. Specially balanced juggling knives are used, usually with a bevelled edge to appear sharp. Performing with genuine machetes is not generally advised because the spin and balance are unfavourable, and tricks beyond the basics become much more difficult. Various bladed implements can be juggled, but many have a dangerous and unpredictable spin as seen on an axe or chainsaw. Such items are generally avoided, although chainsaws provide a preferable spin to axes if needs must.

Juggling knives are constructed with a blade of steel or sheet aluminium several millimeters thick and a wooden or composite handle such as found on juggling clubs. The blades are often scimitar shaped with a bevelled 'cutting' edge, and the other edges are rolled to prevent injury. The other common blade shape is an elongated diamond with all edges and the point rolled or otherwise made safe. While this makes knife juggling much safer than popularly assumed, knives can still cause severe trauma injuries to the head and body when falling from a height. Because of this, the juggling of large lumps of metal should only be attempted by competent club jugglers who understand the risks.

== World records ==
The current world records for juggling both five (103 throws and catches) and six knives (six throws and six catches) are held by Thom Wall.
