= Juggling in ancient China =

A tombstone from the Han dynasty depicting a juggler with twelve balls (from the Shaanxi Suide County Museum)

Lanzi juggling seven swords, from a collection of Ming dynasty woodcuts

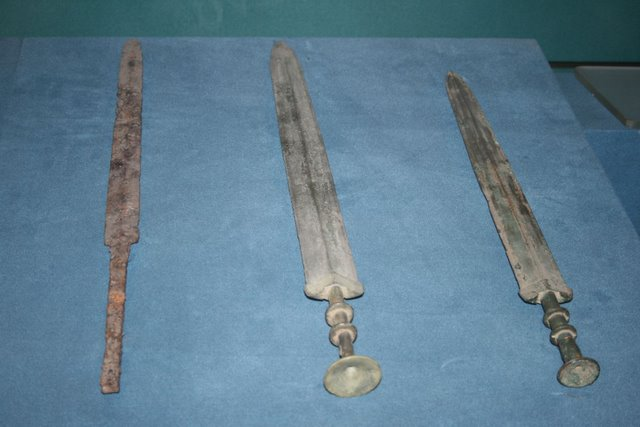
Iron and bronze swords typical of what Lanzi may have juggled

Although juggling in its western form involving props such as balls, rings, and clubs is rarely performed in modern China, at certain periods in Chinese history it was much more popular. In fact, some of the world's earliest known jugglers were Chinese warriors and entertainers who lived during the time of the Spring and Autumn period of Chinese history. References to these artists in ancient Chinese literature have preserved records of their incredible achievements. From such references, it appears that juggling was a well-regarded and highly developed form of ancient Chinese art.

== Xiong Yiliao ==
Xiong Yiliao (Chinese: 熊宜僚; pinyin: Xióng Yiliáo), was a famous Chu warrior who fought under King Zhuang of Chu (ruled 613–591 BC) during the Spring and Autumn period of Chinese history. Ancient Chinese annals state that he practiced nongwan (Chinese: 弄丸; pinyin: nòngwán, "throwing multiple objects up and down without dropping"), and he is often cited as one of the world's earliest known jugglers. During a battle in about 603 BC between the states of Chu (Chinese: 楚國; pinyin: Chǔguó) and Song (Chinese: 宋国; pinyin: Sòngguó), Xiong Yiliao stepped out between the armies and juggled nine balls, captivating the Song troops. The Chu army took this opportunity to launch a surprise attack and routed the Song army. As Xu Wugui (Chinese: 徐无鬼; pinyin: Xú Wúguǐ) recounts in Chapter 24 of the Zhuangzi (Chinese: 庄子; pinyin: Zhuāngzi), “Yiliao of Shinan juggled balls, and the conflict between the two states was ended.”

== Lanzi ==
Lanzi (Chinese: 蘭子; pinyin: Lánzi), another juggler from the Spring and Autumn period who is mentioned in the Chinese annals, lived during the reign of Duke Yuan of Song (Chinese: 宋元公; pinyin: Sòng Yuángōng, 531–517 BC). Roughly translated, Chapter 8 of the Liezi (Chinese: 列子; pinyin: Lièzi), an ancient collection of Daoist sayings, reads as follows:

In the State of Song there lived a man named Lanzi, who sought favor from Lord Yuan of Song for his skills. Lord Yuan of Song summoned him, and he performed on stilts that were twice as long as his body and attached to his legs. He walked and ran on them, and he also juggled seven swords, alternately throwing them and always keeping five swords in the air. Lord Yuan was amazed, and at once he granted Lanzi gold and silk. Later, Lanzi again returned to perform for Lord Yuan. Lord Yuan angrily said, "Before, I was astonished by your skill, and I was pleased to confer gold and silk. However I am displeased that you have again returned hoping for my reward." Lanzi was arrested and they planned to kill him, but after a month he was freed.

The passage states that Lanzi juggled the jian (Chinese: 劍; pinyin: jiàn), a straight, double-edged sword which was used during the Spring and Autumn period. According to Jian Zhao in The Early Warrior and the Birth of the Xia, Lanzi was a general term for itinerant entertainers in pre-Qin and Han times.

== Chinese yo-yo ==
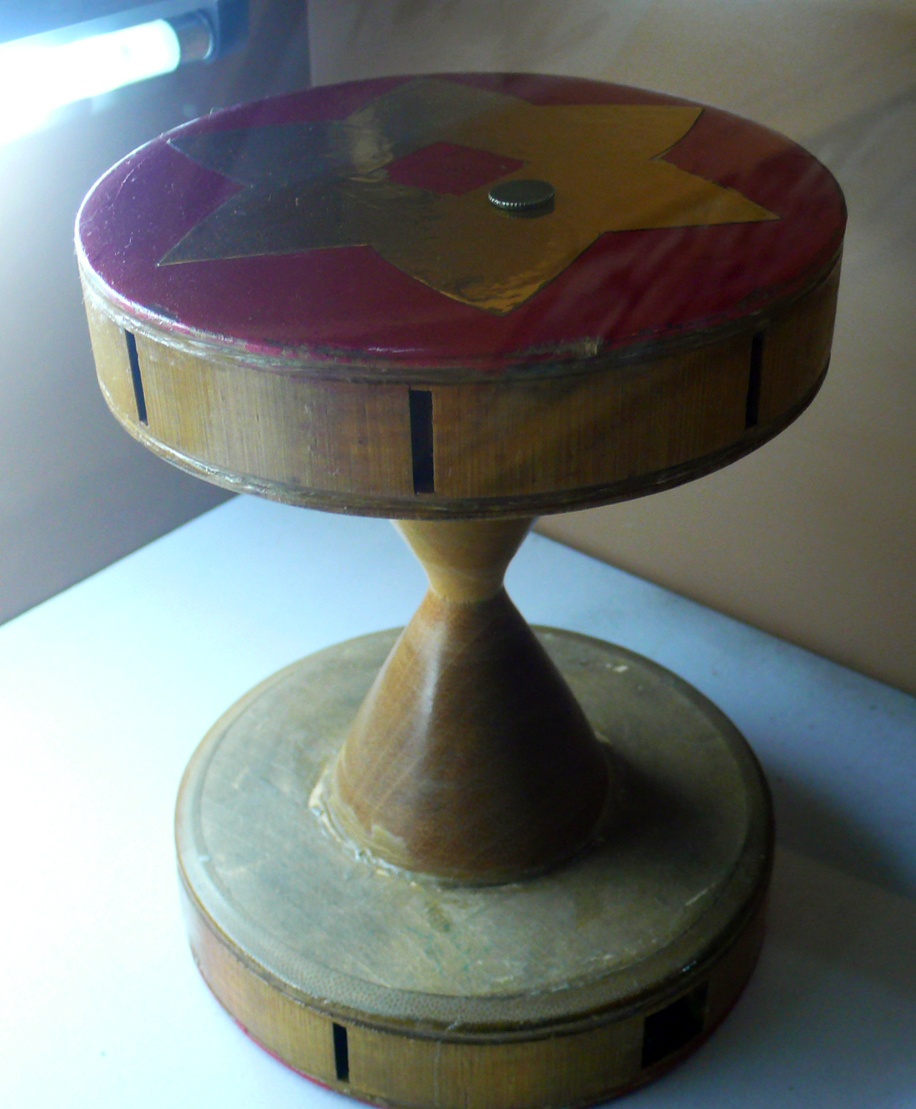
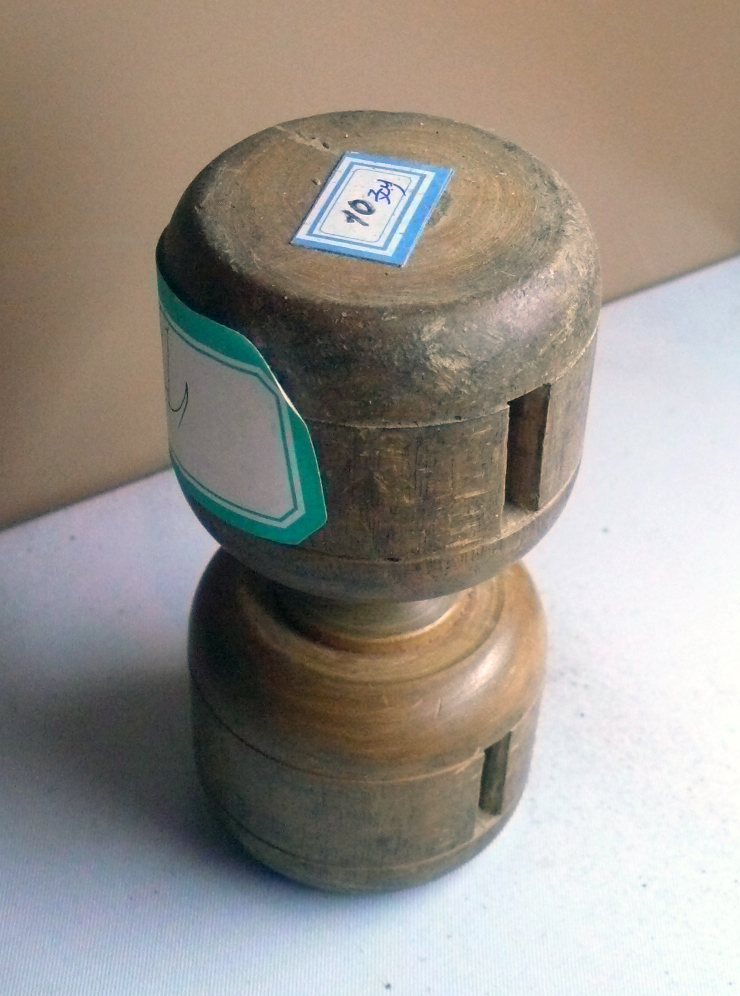
Chinese yo-yos

Diabolos evolved from the ancient Chinese yo-yo, which was originally standardized in the 12th century.

== See also ==
- zh:熊宜僚 Chinese Wikipedia: 熊宜僚
