= Passing (juggling) =

Juggling between two or more people

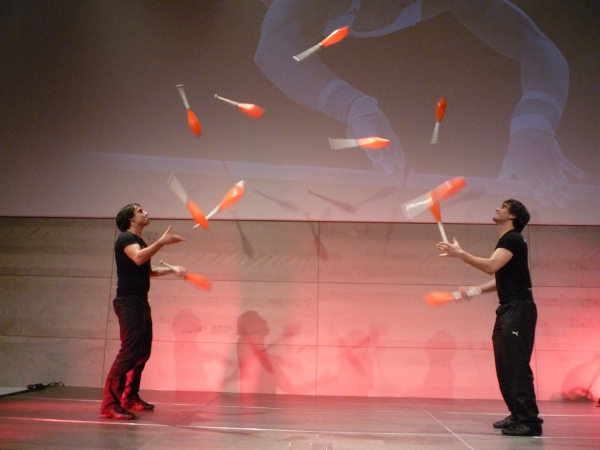
Manuel and Christoph Mitasch, world-record-holding club passers

Pass juggling may include more than two people.

Passing is the act of juggling between two or more people. It is most commonly seen as a subset of toss juggling.

== Passing ==
Passing can be performed with three or more juggling props but is most commonly performed with six objects such as balls, rings or clubs. "This is the basic part of team juggling and it requires two pretty smooth jugglers." Jugglers can perform passing one person standing behind the other, back to back, or side by side but the most usual stance is where the jugglers face each other.

== Props ==
Clubs are the prop of choice for passing because of the larger surface area available for catching (most often the handle), the variety of possible tricks that can be performed and the higher visibility of the props for an audience. Rings are sometimes chosen for numbers passing because of their light weight and reduced chance of collisions in the air during a passing pattern. Balls are not commonly used for passing with the exception of beginners and for bounce juggling passing.

== Technique ==
Passing technique varies depending on the prop being used and the position of the jugglers. The standard passing pattern, where the jugglers face each other and are each juggling three props requires a high degree of competence in the solo juggling of that prop. This standard pattern can be described as the props travelling in a rectangle or box shape. Throws across the short end of the box are self throws by each juggler and throws to the other person are parallel throws to the other person. Throws from one juggler to the other are by convention usually thrown from the right hand and caught by the other juggler with the left hand. The tempo of the throws to the other juggler are usually a two count: that is a juggler will throw one prop to themselves from their right hand and then the next prop in the right hand to the other juggler. This is sometimes called every others. The throwing and catching technique for each type of prop is specific to that type of prop.

Beginners usually start with ball passing but often move on to ring and then club passing. Club passing is the most popular because the props allow for a greater latitude in where they are caught, the range of tricks available are much greater than other props and the patterns available are more visual.

== Passing patterns ==
Four-count

Three-count

Two-count

One-count

A passing pattern is a sequence of throws and catches using a certain number of props which is repeated continuously. An example would be the standard 6 club passing pattern between two jugglers with the throws on a two count tempo. Passing patterns, however, vary in complexity from the simple: where only two jugglers pass three objects (usually three clubs which is called 'running three'), to many jugglers passing numerous clubs in complex patterns. Patterns differ from tricks which are instead a throw or catch which is different to the throws and catches within a pattern. An example would be where a single prop is thrown high to the other juggler at the correct time so that it the other juggler can catch it in the space available and the jugglers then return to the pattern they were juggling.

=== 6 clubs ===
<3333p|3333p> pattern ladder diagram with a rail per juggler

A basic variation in the pattern depends on how often the "self throw" is replaced with a pass. For practice, Besmehn recommends what may be called 'six-count': "Use four balls of one color and two of another color...every time an odd-colored ball reaches your right hand, pass it." Klutz recommends the same pattern: "It helps ... if one of you counts out loud every time a toss leaves your right hand[s] ... On a pre-arranged number, say three [six beats], instead of tossing across to your own left hand, throw your bag ... over to your friend's left hand." Siteswap: <333333p|333333p>

Four-count, or "Every others"
One of the most basic forms of passing is called four-count. In four-count, every fourth throw—that is, every second right-handed throw—is a passing throw. Siteswap: <3333p|3333p>
Three-count, or "Waltz"
In three-count, every third throw is a pass. "When you can pass every third ball consistently, try passing every other ball." This means that the passing throw alternates from the left hand to the right hand, with the same club being passed each time. Siteswap: <333p|333p>
Two-count, "Solids", or "Everies"
Every right-handed throw is a pass. This is a fast-paced pattern which can be maintained for a long period of time with practice. "The pattern goes pass, self throw, pass, self throw, pass, and so on." "Instead of just tossing across to your partner on every third [right hand] throw, toss every right hand bag across." Siteswap: <33p|33p>
One-count, or "ultimates", also referred to as a "thunder shower"
Every throw is a pass. Effectively, two separate juggling patterns are formed: One between the left hand of the first juggler, and the right hand of the second, and vice versa. This is a very quick pattern which is rarely maintained for long periods. It requires equal skill with both hands. Siteswap: <3p|3p>

Other popular patterns are;

Pass Pass Self
Literally where both people perform Pass, Pass, Self. Siteswap: <3p3p3|3p3p3>
Book Ends
Where both people perform Pass, Self, Pass, Self, Pass. The hand you are passing with should change hands after three passes with no selves in between. Siteswap: <3p33p33p|3p33p33p>
Jim's
Jim's patterns are a variant of passing where one juggler passes crosses (diagonally) whilst the other passes straights. This leads to interesting complexities such as hurries (where one hand will throw receive a pass and throw again whilst the other holds a club). Jim's can be applied to most if not all patterns, although the six club Pass Pass Self pattern leaves the person throwing straights never passing with the left hand.
Chocolate Bar
The Chocolate bar is a variant on the one-count passing pattern where you alternate between self-throws and passes. The pattern is two passes followed by two self-throws. It allows passers to get practice passing ultimates while at the same time getting the occasional break.

=== 7 clubs ===
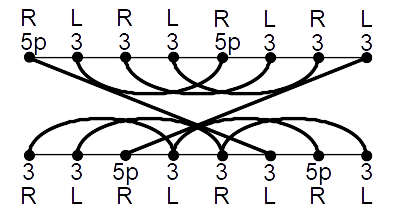
Simplest 4 count 7 prop pattern Siteswap: <5p333><335p3>

7 Singles
Similar to the 6 club two-count but with a change in rhythm and speed to accommodate the extra object. The second person (starting with three clubs) makes their first passing throw when their partners’ first club is halfway between the two jugglers. 7 club passing is therefore an offset or asynchronous passing pattern, unlike 6 club passing which is a synchronous passing pattern (both jugglers passing at the same time).
7 Doubles
Same rhythm as 7 singles but passes are made as doubles which reduces the speed of the juggling.
7 four-count
Similar to 6 club four-count but each pass is made as a triple and the passes are asynchronous.
Popcorn
Each person performs the same routine but the first person starts halfway through the second persons routine. Each perform Right hand crossing self triple, left hand single, Right hand double parallel pass, left hand single, right hand single. The first person (with four clubs) throws their tramline double pass and waits till the return one is halfway across before they throw their first double. The second person waits till the first persons double is halfway across before making their triple.

== Tricks ==
There are many tricks that can be performed over the pattern, including varying the throwing method (under the leg, behind the back, spinning the wrong way, not spinning at all) and the throwing height (which requires the other person to fill in while waiting to catch it). Club pass juggling may include tosses without a flip, "floaters", or tosses with a double or triple flip, "spinners". It is also possible to pass with more than two people, and with more than three clubs each.

== Starting ==
Two conventions are commonly used:

Slow start
Both jugglers begin with self-throws, as if they had just received an incoming pass. Thus for four-count, each juggler will make four self-throws and pass on the fifth.
Fast start
Both jugglers begin with a pass.

Slow start is generally preferred by beginners, but fast start is more popular amongst confirmed passers.

Asynchronous start
One jugglers throws a pass, the other juggler waits or throws self throws first.

This happens when 1 juggler has more objects at the start, for example when 2 jugglers pass 7 objects.

== Rhythms ==
There are three main types of rhythm. The first is the usual where each hand throws with equal time between each other. The second is sometimes referred to as a galloped rhythm, when the left hand only throws after a little after the right hand has thrown. The third is synchronous, when both hands throw at the same time.

== Collisions ==
A collision is when two or more clubs hit each other in the air. Usually they are unrecoverable. There are ways of avoiding collisions. For example, in 6 club Ultimates, both throwing from in to out can prevent the clubs from colliding. Other ways are to make one person throw wider than they would normally do.

== Records ==
As for solo juggling, world records for passing are kept. The rules generally require that two-count passing be used, and that the number of successful catches be four times the number of props, in order for a passing attempt to be successful. Current world records are as follows:

- 14 clubs for 16 passes caught by Dominik Harant and Manuel Mitasch in 2015. (Video on YouTube)
- 13 clubs for 30 passes caught by Manuel Mitasch and Dominik Harant in 2013. (Video on YouTube)
- 12 clubs for 77 passes caught by Daniel Ledel and Dominik Harant in 2012.
- 11 clubs for 237 passes caught by Manuel Mitasch and Christoph Mitasch in 2010.(Video on YouTube)
- 10 clubs for 682 passes caught by Daniel Ledel and Dominik Harant in 2011.
- 9 clubs for 1392 passes caught by Manuel Mitasch and Christoph Mitasch in 2007.(Video on YouTube)

Three-person club passing records with publicly available video evidence:

- 18 clubs for 18 passes caught by Manuel Mitasch, Daniel Ledel, and Dominik Harant in 2013 (Video on YouTube)
- 17 clubs for 106 passes caught by Manuel Mitasch, Daniel Ledel, and Dominik Harant in 2016 (Video on YouTube)
- 16 clubs for 151 passes caught by Manuel Mitasch, Daniel Ledel, and Dominik Harant in 2016 (Video on YouTube)
- 15 clubs for 180 passes caught by Manuel Mitasch, Daniel Ledel, and Dominik Harant in 2016 (Video on YouTube)
