= Luca Pferdmenges =

German Juggler

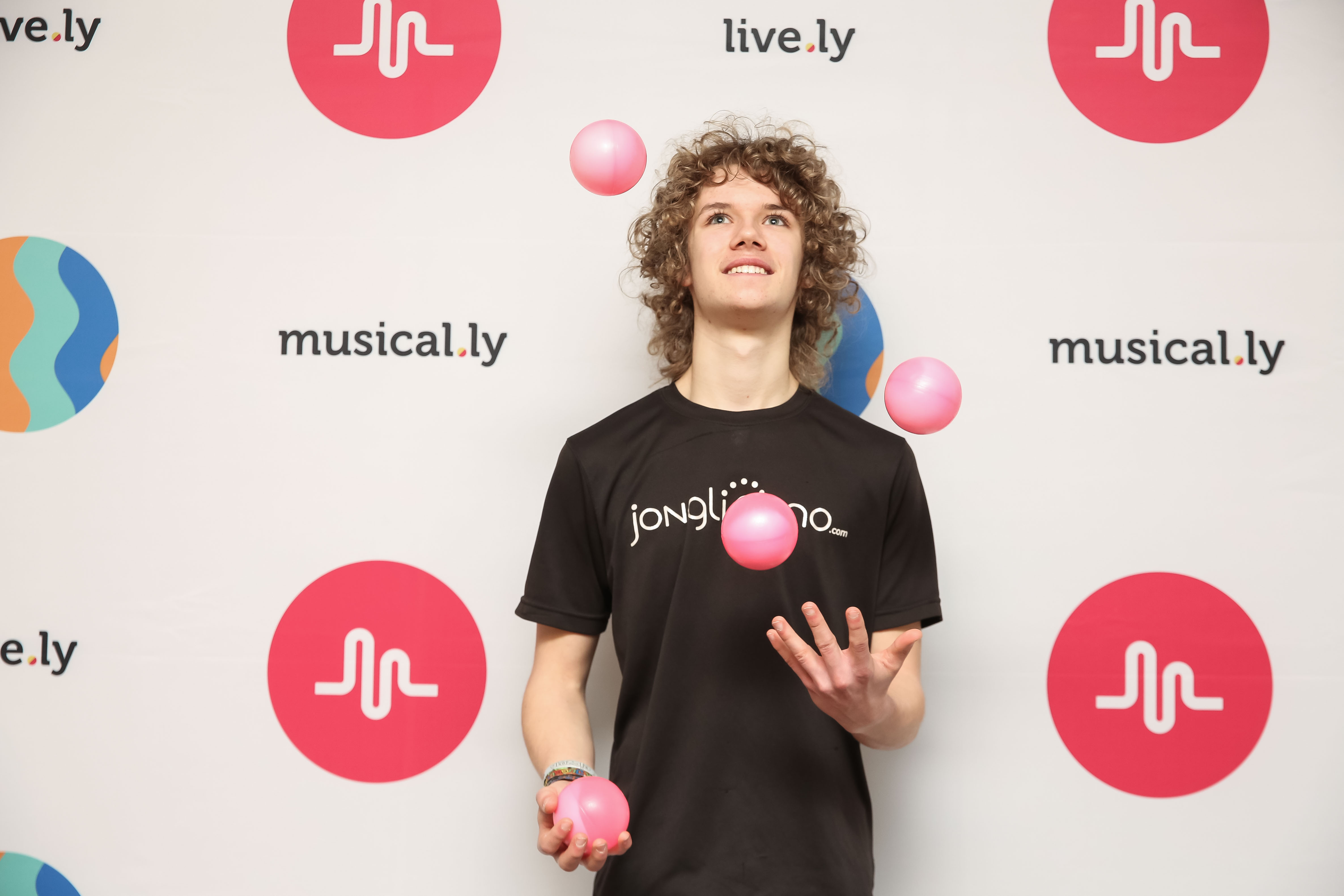
Pferdmenges at a musical.ly press day in Berlin, 2018

Luca Pferdmenges (born August 24, 2001, in Mönchengladbach) is a juggler and social media influencer from Germany. He became popular after reaching the finals of the German talent show Superkids. In 2022, he was featured on the Forbes 30 Under 30 list in the category "Sports & Games".

== Early life ==
Pferdmenges grew up in Mönchengladbach, Germany.

== Career ==
Pferdmenges was trying to become the youngest man to visit every country in the world. He speaks German, English, French, Spanish, and Hebrew. His German language book on Juggling, Jonglieren wie ein Profi, was coauthored with Joscha F. Westerkamp and was published in October 2022 by Meyer & Meyer. He also cowrote and self-published a book on travel, Billig Reisen, released the same month.

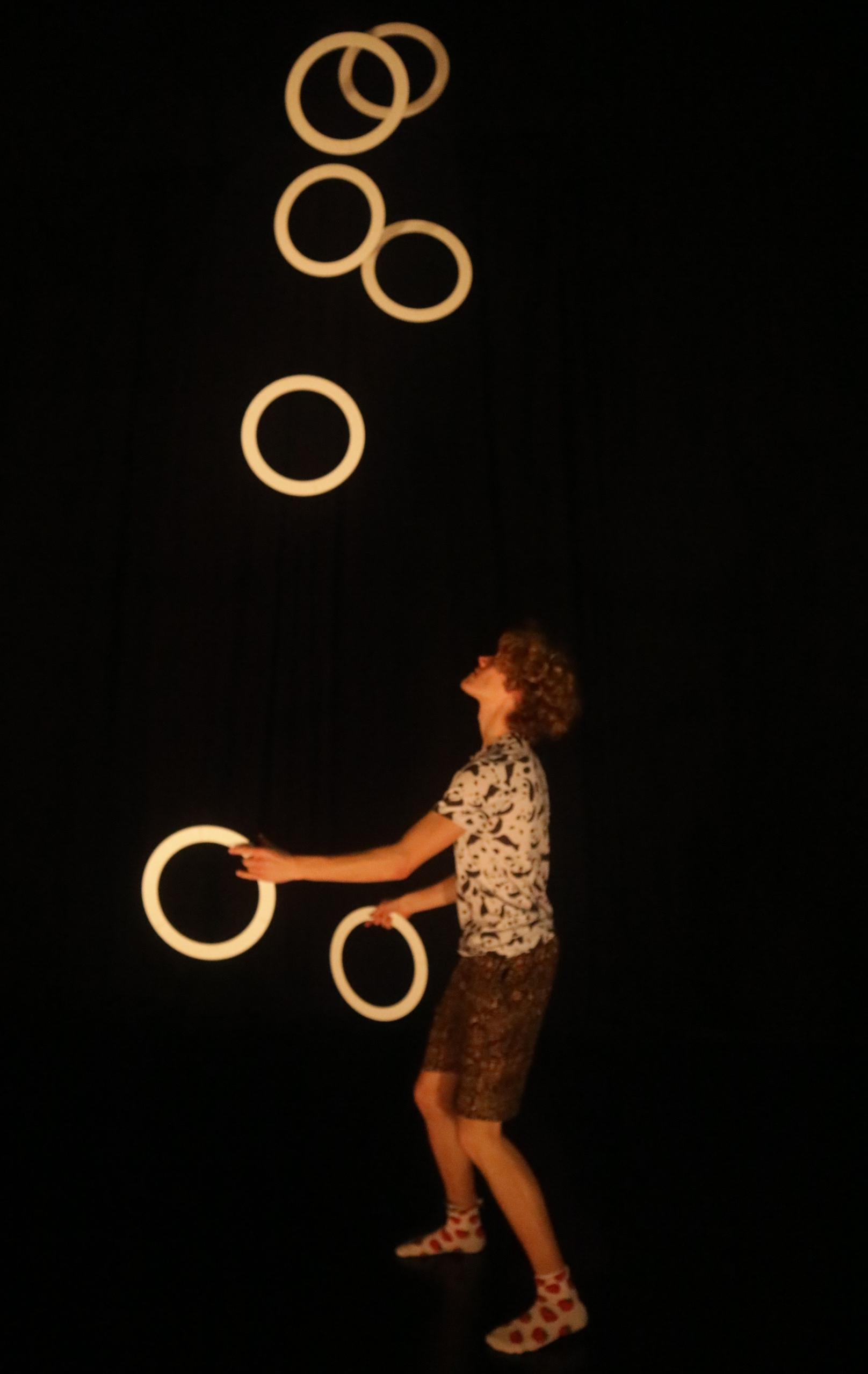
Luca Pferdmenges in 2020

Luca Pferdmenges frequently attends juggling festivals.

In July 2016, Pferdmenges appeared on the Sat.1 talent show Superkids and advanced to the finals of the show. He was chosen by Rheinische Post as a "Person of the Year" in Mönchengladbach for the 2021.

Pferdmenges participated in the "NK Jongleren" (Open Dutch Juggling Championships) in 2016 and 2017 and won various titles.

In January 2018, Luca Pferdmenges went on tour through Germany with Jonglissimo as part of the "Feuerwerk der Turnkunst – AURA" show.

In 2022, he was featured on the Forbes 30 Under 30 list in the category "Sports & Games", the first juggler to achieve this.

On April 24th, 2025, he accomplished his goal of traveling to every country in the world.

== Records ==
According to Guinness World Records, Pferdmenges holds a number of world records:

- Most balls passed by a duo whilst juggling – 16 balls (with Daniel Ledel)
- Most consecutive side by side juggling catches by a team of two – 901 catches (with Jan Daumin)
- Most 360 degree spins while juggling four objects in one minute – 29 spins
- Until 2022, most consecutive backcross juggling catches (three objects) – 1,249 catches

Pferdmenges was featured in the German edition of the Guinness World Records Book 2022 with two of his records.

He was elected to the list of the world's 40 famous jugglers, published by Luke Burrage, three times.
