= Christoph and Manuel Mitasch =

Austrian juggling team

The two brothers Christoph (born July 23, 1982, in Linz) and Manuel Mitasch (born June 5, 1986, in Linz) are a world class juggling team from Austria. They are performing under the stage name Jonglissimo.

Starting in 2004 they have broken various world records in club passing, including:

- 9 clubs - 1392 passes caught
- 10 clubs - 607 passes caught
- 11 clubs - 237 passes caught
- 12 clubs - 74 passes caught

In 2005 and 2007 they won the teams competition at the IJA Championships.

In January 2013 Christoph and Manuel participated together with Daniel Ledel and Dominik Harant as first Austrian team at Festival Mondial du Cirque de Demain in Paris. Jonglissimo was awarded two prizes at the international Young Stage Festival in Basel in May 2014.

In the fall of 2014, Jonglissimo made it into the live shows of the fourth season of The Great Chance.

In 2025, America's Got Talent —

== See also ==
- List of jugglers
