= List of schools in Malacca =

This is a list of schools in Malacca, Malaysia. It is categorised according to the variants of schools in Malaysia, and is arranged alphabetically.

== International School ==
These schools provide both the local and expatriate population with British Curriculum Education and are approved Cambridge International Examination Centres.

- Melaka International School
- Malacca Expatriate School
- Mahans International School 马汉国际学校
- UUM International School Melaka
- JT International School Melaka
- Planetarium International School Melaka
- Oakrich International School

== Private Schools ==
- Wesley Methodist school
- Sekolah Menengah Islam Al-Amin Bestari D'Merlimau

=== Chinese Independent High School ===
- Pay Fong High School 培风中学

== National Primary School - Sekolah Kebangsaan ==
- Jasin District
  - SK Air Baruk, Jasin (77000)
  - SK Asahan, Asahan (77100)
  - SK Batang Melaka, Batang Melaka (77500)
  - SK Bukit Senggeh, Selandar (77500)
  - SK Batu Gajah, Merlimau (77300)
  - SK Bukit Tembakau, Merlimau (77300)
  - SK Chabau, Asahan (77100)
  - SK Chenderah
  - SK Chinchin
  - SK Chohong
  - SK Datuk Haji Baginda
  - SK Jasin
  - SK Jalan Datuk Palembang
  - SK Jus
  - SK Kemendor
  - SK Kesang Tua
  - SK Masjid Baru
  - SK Merlimau
  - SK Merlimau 1
  - SK Merlimau 2
  - SK Nyalas
  - SK Parit Gantong
  - SK Parit Penghulu
  - SK Pulai
  - SK Sebatu
  - SK Selandar
  - SK Sempang
  - SK Seri Bemban
  - SK Seri Machap
  - SK Seri Mendapat
  - SK Serkam
  - SK Serkam Darat
  - SK Sungai Rambai
  - SK Sri Lanang
  - SK Tedong
  - SK Tehel
  - SK Terentang
- Melaka Tengah District
  - SK Alai
  - SK Ayer Keroh
  - SK Ayer Molek
  - SK Bachang
  - SK Bandar Hilir
  - SK Batu Berendam
  - SK Bendahara Seri Maharaja
  - SK Bertam Hulu
  - SK Bukit Baru
  - SK Bukit Beruang
  - SK Bukit China
  - SK Bukit Lintang
  - SK Bukit Rambai
  - SK Cheng
  - SK Convent of the Infant Jesus 1
  - SK Convent of the Infant Jesus 2
  - SK Dato' Haji Demang Hussin
  - SK Duyong
  - SK Jalan Datuk Palembang
  - SK Kampong Gelam
  - SK Klebang Besar
  - SK Kem Gerak Khas
  - SK Kerubong
  - SK Kubu
  - SK Lereh
  - SK Limbongan
  - SK Malim
  - SK Methodist ACS
  - SK Padang Temu
  - SK Pantai Kudor
  - SK Paya Dalam
  - SK Paya Rendan
  - SK Paya Rumput
  - SK Pendidikan Khas
  - SK Peringgit
  - SK Pernu
  - SK Sacred Heart
  - SK Semabok
  - SK Seri Bandar
  - SK Seri Duyong
  - SK St Francis
  - SK Sungai Udang
  - SK Taman Bukit Rambai
  - SK Tambak Paya
  - SK Tangga Batu
  - SK Telok Mas
  - SK Tengkera 1
  - SK Tengkera 2
  - SK Ujong Pasir
  - SK Perempuan Durian Daun
  - SK Perempuan Methodist 1
  - SK Perempuan Methodist 2
- Alor Gajah District
  - SK Air Jernih
  - SK Alor Gajah 1
  - SK Ayer Limau
  - SK Ayer Pa'abas
  - SK Belimbing Dalam
  - SK Berisu
  - SK Bukit Beringin
  - SK Cherana Puteh
  - SK Dato' Naning
  - SK Dato' Tambichik Karim
  - SK Durian Daun K
  - SK Durian Tunggal
  - SK Gangsa
  - SK Ganun
  - SK Hutan Percha
  - SK Jeram
  - SK Kampung Tengah
  - SK Kem Terendak 1
  - SK Kem Terendak 2
  - SK Kemuning
  - SK Kuala Linggi
  - SK Lendu
  - SK Lubok Redan
  - SK Masjid Tanah
  - SK Melaka Pindah
  - SK Melekek
  - SK Menggong
  - SK Othman Syawal
  - SK Padang Sebang
  - SK Parit Melana
  - SK Pegoh
  - SK Pengkalan Balak
  - SK Pulau Sebang
  - SK Ramuan China Besar
  - SK Ramuan China Kechil
  - SK Rantau Panjang
  - SK Rumbia
  - SK Simpang Empat
  - SK Sri Laksamana
  - SK Sungai Buloh
  - SK Sungai Jernih
  - SK Sungai Petai
  - SK Sungai Siput
  - SK Sungai Tuang
  - SK Tanjung Bidara
  - SK Tebong
  - SK Telok Berembang

== Religious Primary School ==
- SRA Telok Mas
- SRA (JAIM) Cheng

== Chinese Type Primary and Secondary School ==
=== Sekolah Menengah Jenis Kebangsaan (SMJK) ===
- SMJK Notre Dame Convent 圣母女子国民型华文中学
- SMJK Pulau Sebang 普罗士邦国民型华文中学
- SMJK Yok Bin 育民国民型华文中学
- SMJK Katholik 公教国民型华文中学
- SMJK Tinggi Cina Melaka 马六甲华文国民型高等中学

=== Chinese Primary School (SJKC) Sekolah Rendah Jenis Kebangsaan Cina ===
Jasin District

  - SJK (C) Chung Hwa
  - SJK (C) Parit Keliling
  - SJK (C) Kemendor
  - SJK (C) Merlimau
  - SJK (C) Jasin Lalang
  - SJK (C) On Lok
  - SJK (C) Chiao Chee
  - SJK (C) Kiow Nam
  - SJK (C) Kuang Hwa
  - SJK (C) Pay Chiao
  - SJK (C) Pay Chuin
  - SJK (C) Pay Hsien
  - SJK (C) Pay Min
  - SJK (C) Pay Yap
  - SJK (C) Pondok Batang
  - SJK (C) Shuh Yen
  - SJK (C) Simpang Bekoh
  - SJK (C) Toon Hwa
  - SJK (C) Yu Hsien

Melaka Tengah District

  - SJK (C) Sungai Udang
  - SJK (C) Pay Hwa
  - SJK (C) Ping Ming
  - SJK (C) Wen Hwa
  - SJK (C) Chung Kuo
  - SJK (C) Siang Lin
  - SJK (C) Pay Fong 1
  - SJK (C) Pay Fong 2
  - SJK (C) Pay Fong 3
  - SJK (C) Poh Lan
  - SJK (C) St Mary
  - SJK (C) Bachang
  - SJK (C) Bertam Ulu
  - SJK (C) Bukit Beruang
  - SJK (C) Notre Dame
  - SJK (C) Ayer Keroh
  - SJK (C) Pay Teck
  - SJK (C) Cheng
  - SJK (C) Ek Te
  - SJK (C) Katholik
  - SJK (C) Keh Seng
  - SJK (C) Kuang Yah
  - SJK (C) Lih Jen
  - SJK (C) Malim
  - SJK (C) Tiang Dua
  - SJK (C) Ting Hwa
  - SJK (C) Ying Chye
  - SJK (C) Yok Bin
  - SJK (C) Yu Hwa
  - SJK (C) Yu Ying

Alor Gajah District

  - SJK (C) Alor Gajah
  - SJK (C) Kiow Min
  - SJK (C) Lendu
  - SJK (C) Machap Baru
  - SJK (C) Machap Umboo
  - SJK (C) Masjid Tanah
  - SJK (C) Paya Mengkuang
  - SJK (C) Peng Min Gadek
  - SJK (C) Sann Yuh
  - SJK (C) Pay Chee
  - SJK (C) Sin Wah
  - SJK (C) Taboh Naning
  - SJK (C) Yok Sin
  - SJK (C) Chabau
  - SJK (C) Sin Min
  - SJK (C) Khiak Yew

== Tamil Primary School ==
=== Jasin District ===
  - SJK (T) Jasin
  - SJK (T) Ladang Bukit Asahan
  - SJK (T) Ladang Bukit Kajang
  - SJK (T) Ladang Diamond Jubilee
  - SJK (T) Ladang Jasin Lalang
  - SJK (T) Ladang Serkam
  - SJK (T) Merlimau
  - SJK (T) Batang Melaka

=== Melaka Tengah District ===
  - SJK (T) Bukit Lintang
  - SJK (T) Melaka Kubu
  - SJK (T) Paya Rumput

=== Alor Gajah District ===
  - SJK (T) Alor Gajah
  - SJK (T) Durian Tunggal
  - SJK (T) Kemuning
  - SJK (T) Ladang Gadek
  - SJK (T) Ladang Kemuning
  - SJK (T) Ladang Sungai Baru
  - SJK (T) Ladang Tebong
  - SJK (T) Pekan Tebong
  - SJK (T) Pulau Sebang
  - SJK (T) Rumbia

== National Secondary School - Sekolah Menengah Kebangsaan ==
=== Sekolah Berasrama Penuh (Kerajaan) ===
  - Sekolah Menengah Sains Muzaffar Syah
  - Sekolah Berasrama Penuh Integrasi Selandar
  - Maktab Rendah Sains MARA Tun Ghafar Baba
  - Maktab Rendah Sains MARA Alor Gajah
  - Maktab Rendah Sains MARA Terendak
  - Sekolah Menengah Sains Alor Gajah

=== Sekolah Menengah Teknik ===
  - Sekolah Menengah Teknik Bukit Piatu
  - Sekolah Menengah Teknik Datuk Seri Mohd Zin
  - Sekolah Menengah Teknik Jasin
  - Sekolah Menengah Teknik Melaka Tengah

=== Former missionary schools(1826-1976) - Sekolah Menengah Kebangsaan(1977-current) ===
- Malacca High School (SMK TINGGI MELAKA)
- St. David High School (SMK TINGGI ST DAVID)
- Methodist Girls' School (SMK PEREMPUAN METHODIST)
- Infant Jesus Convent, Malacca (SMK INFANT JESUS CONVENT)
- St. Francis Institution (SMK ST FRANCIS)
- Canossa Convent High School (SMK CANOSSA CONVENT)
- Methodist (ACS) High School (SMK METHODIST (ACS))

=== Secondary education: Sekolah Menengah Kebangsaan (SMK) ===
School code	School name	Postcode	Area	Coordinates
MEA0074	SMK Ade Putra	78300	Masjid Tanah	2.3277°N 102.0862°E
MEA2091	SMK Air Molek	75460	Melaka	2.1972°N 102.3297°E
MEA2100	SMK Ayer Keroh	75450	Ayer Keroh	2.2801°N 102.2825°E
MEA2093	SMK Bukit Baru	75450	Melaka	2.2405°N 102.2860°E
MEA2095	SMK Bukit Katil	75450	Melaka	2.2284°N 102.3090°E
MEA2099	SMK Bukit Rambai	75250	Melaka	2.2581°N 102.1730°E
MEB2098	SMK Canossa Convent (M)	75050	Melaka	2.1833°N 102.2680°E
MEB1064	SMK Dang Anum	77300	Merlimau	2.1572°N 102.4284°E
MEA1061	SMK Dato' Abdul Rahman Ya'kub	77300	Merlimau	2.1588°N 102.4292°E
MEE0075	SMK Dato' Dol Said	78000	Alor Gajah	2.3743°N 102.2086°E
MEA0072	SMK Dato' Haji Talib Karim	78000	Alor Gajah	2.3886°N 102.2125°E
MEB1063	SMK Datuk Bendahara	77000	Jasin	2.3080°N 102.4246°E
MEA0101	SMK Durian Tunggal	76100	Alor Gajah	2.3073°N 102.2778°E
MEB2091	SMK Gajah Berang	75200	Melaka	2.2029°N 102.2409°E
MEA0071	SMK Ghafar Baba	78300	Masjid Tanah	2.3475°N 102.1059°E
MEA0099	SMK Hang Kasturi	78300	Masjid Tanah	2.3462°N 102.1017°E
MEB2097	SMK Infant Jesus Convent	75000	Melaka	2.1896°N 102.2570°E
MEA1060	SMK Iskandar Shah	77000	Jasin	2.3175°N 102.4309°E
MEA2101	SMK Kampung Gelam	76400	Tanjung Kling	2.2340°N 102.1597°E
MEE0094	SMK Kem Terendak	76200	Kem Terendak	2.2849°N 102.1070°E
MEA2092	SMK Klebang Besar	75200	Melaka	2.2248°N 102.1890°E
MEA0095	SMK Lubok China	78100	Lubok China	2.4479°N 102.0706°E
MEA2096	SMK Malim	75250	Melaka	2.2516°N 102.2245°E
MEB2094	SMK Methodist (ACS) Melaka (M)	75200	Melaka	2.2049°N 102.2368°E
MEA2087	SMK Munshi Abdullah	75350	Melaka	2.2548°N 102.2554°E
MEA0075	SMK Naning	78000	Alor Gajah	2.4261°N 102.1921°E
MEA1079	SMK Nyalas	77100	Asahan	2.4321°N 102.4665°E
MEA2097	SMK Padang Temu	75050	Melaka	2.1876°N 102.2848°E
MEA2103	SMK Paya Rumput	76450	Melaka	2.2944°N 102.2126°E
MEB2095	SMK Perempuan Methodist	75200	Melaka	2.2051°N 102.2343°E
MEA2102	SMK Pernu	75460	Melaka	2.1727°N 102.3377°E
MEA0073	SMK Rahmat	78200	Kuala Sungai Baru	2.3663°N 102.0521°E
MEA1077	SMK Selandar	77500	Selandar	2.3881°N 102.3760°E
MEA1080	SMK Seri Bemban	77200	Bemban	2.2723°N 102.3790°E
MEB2145	SMK Seri Kota	75050	Melaka	2.1981°N 102.2634°E
MEB0077	SMK Seri Pengkalan	78000	Alor Gajah	2.3708°N 102.2238°E
MEA2089	SMK Seri Tanjung	76400	Tanjung Kling	2.2437°N 102.1563°E
MEA1076	SMK Simpang Bekoh	77100	Jasin	2.3599°N 102.5100°E
MEA1072	SMK Sri Mahkota	77300	Merlimau	2.1468°N 102.3657°E
MEB2096	SMK St Francis	75000	Melaka	2.1912°N 102.2529°E
MEB0079	SMK Sultan Alauddin	78300	Masjid Tanah	2.3473°N 102.1023°E
MEE0074	SMK Sultan Mansor Shah	73000	Tampin Pos	2.4680°N 102.2266°E
MEA1078	SMK Sungai Rambai	77400	Merlimau	2.1297°N 102.4920°E
MEA0100	SMK Sungai Udang	76300	Sungai Udang	2.2937°N 102.1350°E
MEB1065	SMK Tan Sri Haji Abdul Aziz Tapa	77000	Jasin	2.3016°N 102.4237°E
MEA0102	SMK Tebong	76460	Alor Gajah	2.4681°N 102.3429°E
MEA2098	SMK Telok Mas	75460	Telok Mas	2.1698°N 102.3200°E
MEB2090	SMK Tinggi Melaka	75000	Melaka	2.1918°N 102.2547°E
MEB2092	SMK Tinggi Perempuan	75400	Melaka	2.2078°N 102.2573°E
MEB2093	SMK Tinggi St David	75150	Melaka	2.2211°N 102.2760°E
MEA2094	SMK Tun Haji Abd Malek	75250	Melaka	2.2664°N 102.2130°E
MEA2088	SMK Tun Mutahir	75350	Melaka	2.2557°N 102.2569°E
MEA1081	SMK Tun Syed Zahiruddin	77300	Merlimau	2.1278°N 102.4450°E
MEA2086	SMK Tun Tijah	75400	Melaka	2.2098°N 102.2580°E
MEB2102	SMK Tun Tuah	75200	Melaka	2.2120°N 102.2365°E

- Sekolah Menengah Kebangsaan Agama
  - Sekolah Menengah Kebangsaan Agama Sultan Muhammad
  - Sekolah Menengah Kebangsaan Agama Sharifah Rodziah
- Sekolah Menengah Tahfiz Al-Quran
  - Sekolah Menengah Tahfiz Al-Quran Chenderah
  - Sekolah Menengah Tahfiz Al-Quran Padang Temu
- Sekolah Menengah Agama
  - Sekolah Menengah Agama Al-Ehya Al-Karim
  - Sekolah Menengah Agama Al-Ahmadi
- Sekolah Menengah Arab
  - Sekolah Menengah Arab As-Syakirin
  - Sekolah Menengah Arab Darul Falah
  - Sekolah Menengah Arab Al-Asyraf
  - Sekolah Menengah Arab Assaiyidah Khadijah

=== Boarding School ===
- Kolej Yayasan Saad
