= MIS =

MIS or mis may refer to:

== Science and technology ==
- Mammography information system, a type of software that manages clinical data related to breast imaging
- Management information system
- Marine isotope stage, stages of the Earth's climate
- Maximal independent set, in graph theory
- Metal-insulator-semiconductor, e.g., in MIS capacitor
- Minimally invasive surgery, surgical techniques with limited incision sizes
- Müllerian inhibiting substance or Anti-Müllerian hormone, a developmental glycoprotein
- Multi Interface Shoe, a Sony camera hotshoe
- Multisystem inflammatory syndrome, a class of medical conditions
- Mass-inflation singularity, a type of weak null singularity inside black holes

== Organizations ==
- Maritime Internet Services Inc.
- Military Intelligence Service (United States), WWII Japanese translation unit
- Movement for the Independence of Sicily

=== Schools ===
- The Mother's International School, New Delhi, India
- Manado Independent School, Indonesia
- Melaka International School, Malaysia
- Myanmar International School, Myanmar
- Munich International School, Germany

== Racetracks ==
- Madison International Speedway, Wisconsin, US
- Michigan International Speedway, Michigan, US

== Other uses ==
- Master of International Studies
- Mexican Institute of Sound, a musical group in Mexico City
- Minimum Income Standard
- Teddy Bear (1981 film), a 1981 Polish film directed by Stanisław Bareja, Polish title Miś
- mis, ISO 639-2 and ISO 639-3 three-letter language code for uncoded languages
- Misima Island Airport (IATA code)
