= Fused quartz =

Glass consisting of pure silica

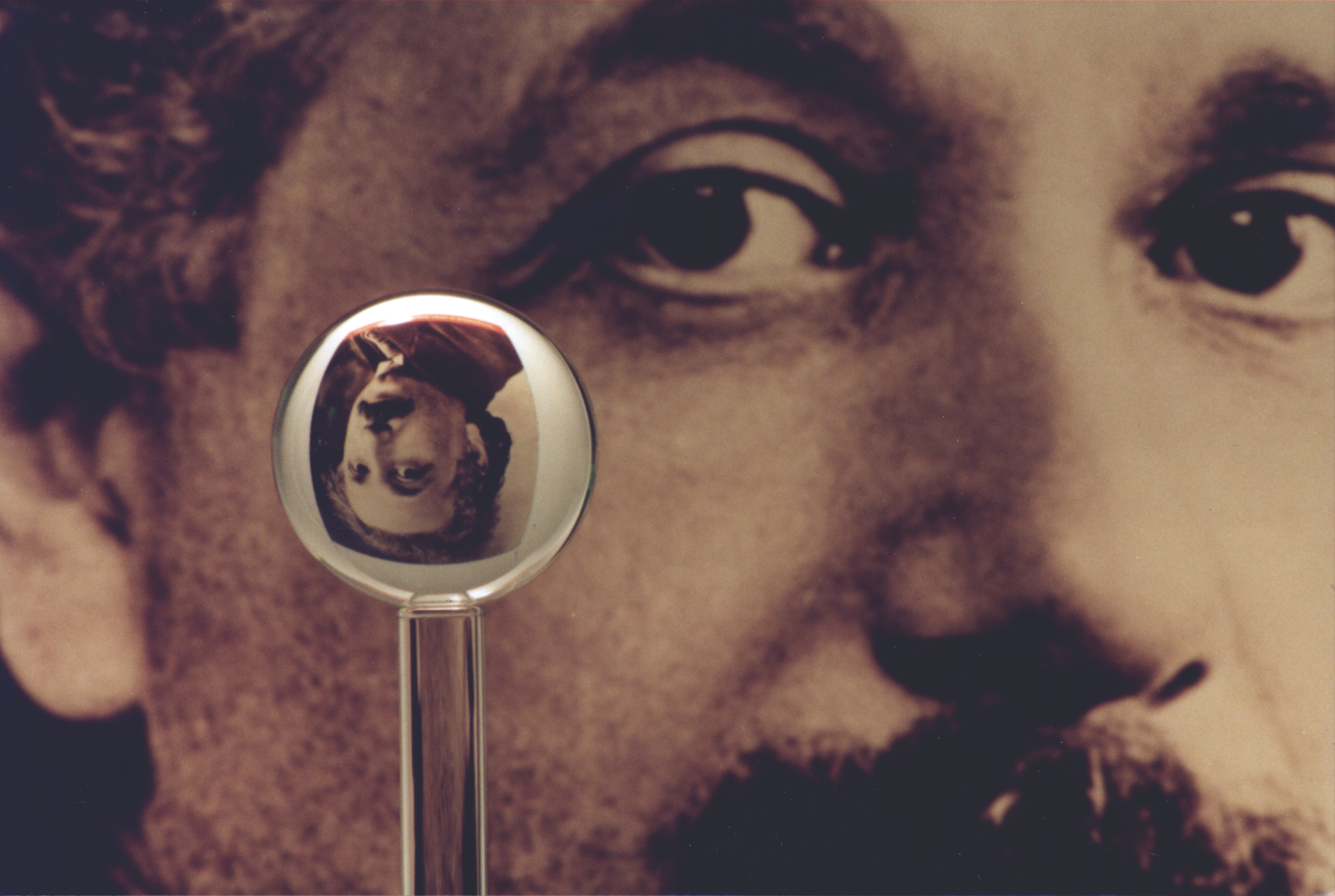
This fused quartz sphere was manufactured for use in a gyroscope in the Gravity Probe B experiment. It is one of the most accurate spheres ever manufactured, deviating from a perfect sphere by no more than 40 atoms of thickness.

Fused quartz, fused silica or quartz glass is a glass consisting of almost pure silica (silicon dioxide, SiO_{2}) in amorphous (non-crystalline) form. This differs from all other commercial glasses, such as soda–lime glass, lead glass, or borosilicate glass, in which other ingredients are added which change the glasses' optical and physical properties, such as lowering the melt temperature, the spectral transmission range, or the mechanical strength. Fused quartz, therefore, has high working and melting temperatures, making it difficult to form and less desirable for most common applications, but is much stronger, more chemically resistant, and exhibits lower thermal expansion, making it more suitable for many specialized uses such as lighting and scientific applications.

The terms fused quartz and fused silica are used interchangeably but can refer to different manufacturing techniques, resulting in different trace impurities. However fused quartz, being in the glassy state, has quite different physical properties compared to crystalline quartz despite being made of the same substance. However, fused silica is entirely synthetic. Due to its physical properties it finds specialty uses in semiconductor fabrication and laboratory equipment, for instance.

Compared to other common glasses, the optical transmission of pure silica extends well into the ultraviolet and infrared wavelengths, so is used to make lenses and other optics for these wavelengths. Depending on manufacturing processes, impurities will restrict the optical transmission, resulting in commercial grades of fused quartz optimized for use in the infrared, or in the ultraviolet. The low coefficient of thermal expansion of fused quartz makes it a useful material for precision mirror substrates or optical flats.

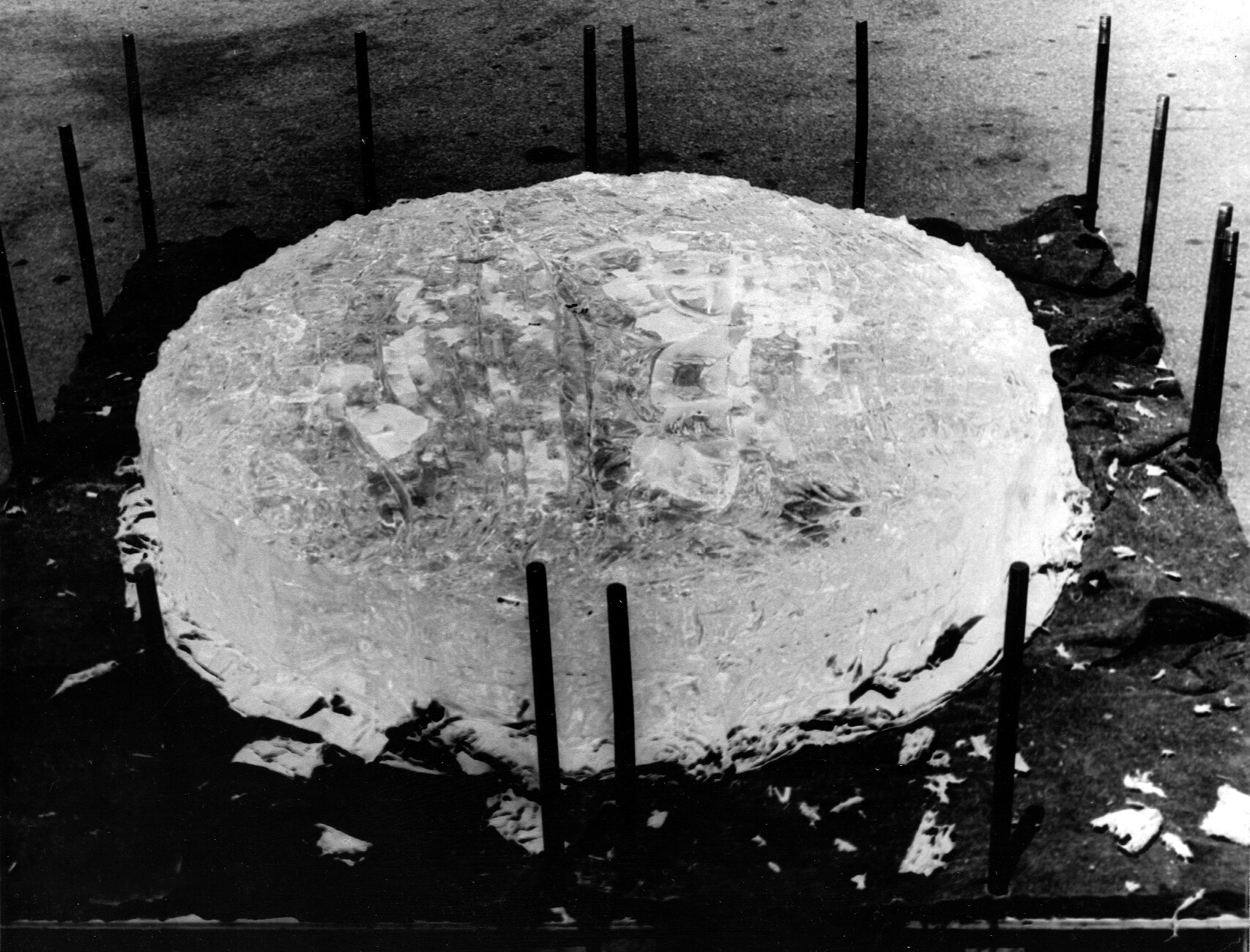
60 inches (150 cm) fused quartz mirror blank for the McMath–Pierce solar telescope in 1962

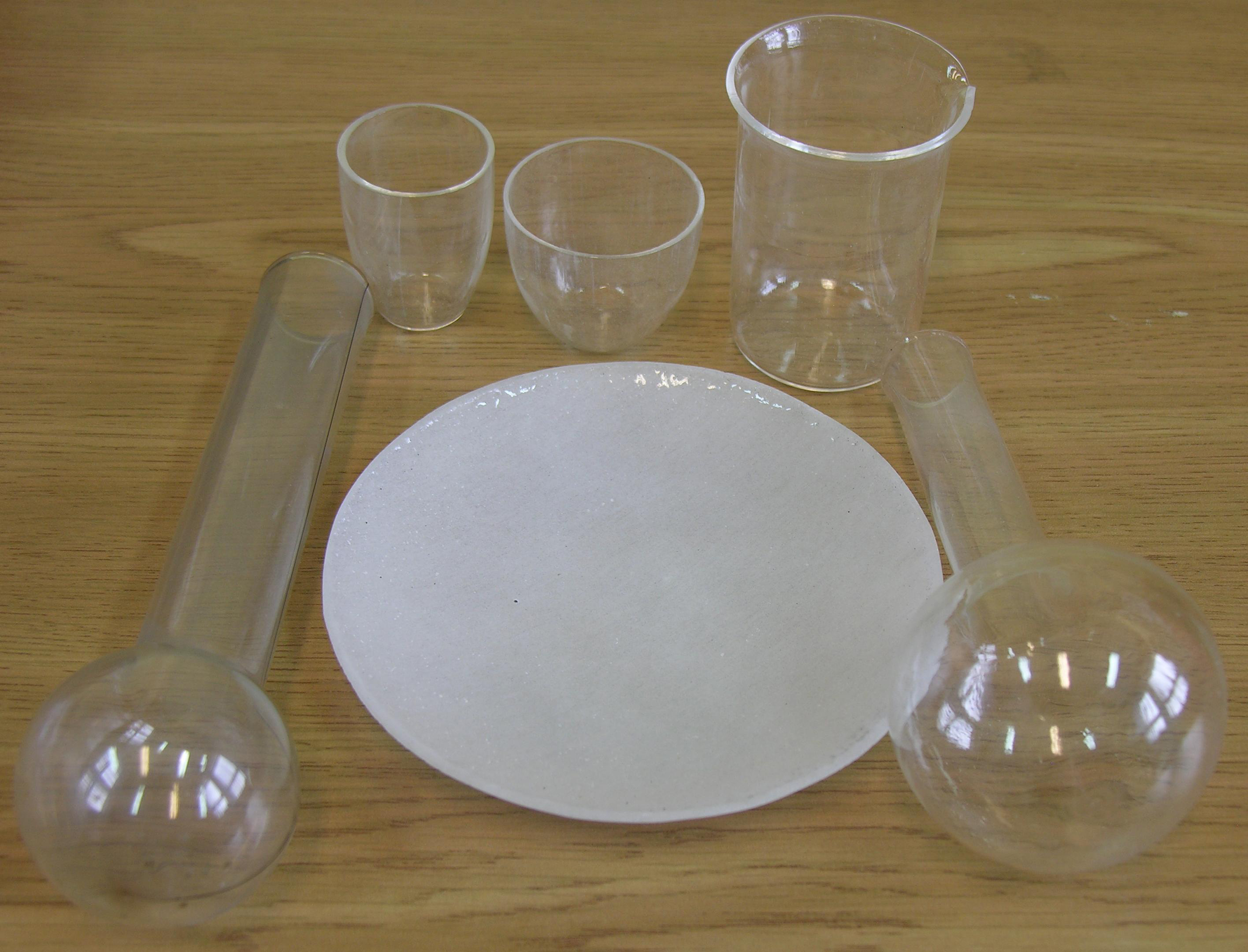
Fused quartz laboratory glassware

== Manufacture ==
Fused quartz is produced by fusing (melting) high-purity silica sand, which consists of quartz crystals. There are four basic types of commercial silica glass:

- Type I is produced by electrically melting natural quartz in a vacuum or an inert atmosphere.
- Type II is produced by fusing quartz crystal powder in a high-temperature flame.
- Type III is produced by burning SiCl_{4} in a hydrogen-oxygen flame.
- Type IV is produced by burning SiCl_{4} in a water vapor-free plasma flame.

Quartz contains only silicon and oxygen, although commercial quartz glass often contains impurities. Two dominant impurities are aluminium and titanium which affect the optical transmission at ultraviolet wavelengths. If water is present in the manufacturing process, hydroxyl (OH) groups may become embedded which reduces transmission in the infrared.

== Fusion ==
Melting is effected at approximately 2200 °C (4000 °F) using either an electrically heated furnace (electrically fused) or a gas/oxygen-fuelled furnace (flame-fused). Fused silica can be made from almost any silicon-rich chemical precursor, usually using a continuous process which involves flame oxidation of volatile silicon compounds to silicon dioxide, and thermal fusion of the resulting dust (although alternative processes are used). This results in a transparent glass with an ultra-high purity and improved optical transmission in the deep ultraviolet. One common method involves adding silicon tetrachloride to a hydrogen–oxygen flame.

== Product quality ==
Fused quartz is normally transparent. The material can, however, become translucent if small air bubbles are allowed to be trapped within. The water content (and therefore infrared transmission) of fused quartz is determined by the manufacturing process. Flame-fused material always has a higher water content due to the combination of the hydrocarbons and oxygen fueling the furnace, forming hydroxyl [OH] groups within the material. An IR grade material typically has an [OH] content below 10 ppm.

== Applications ==
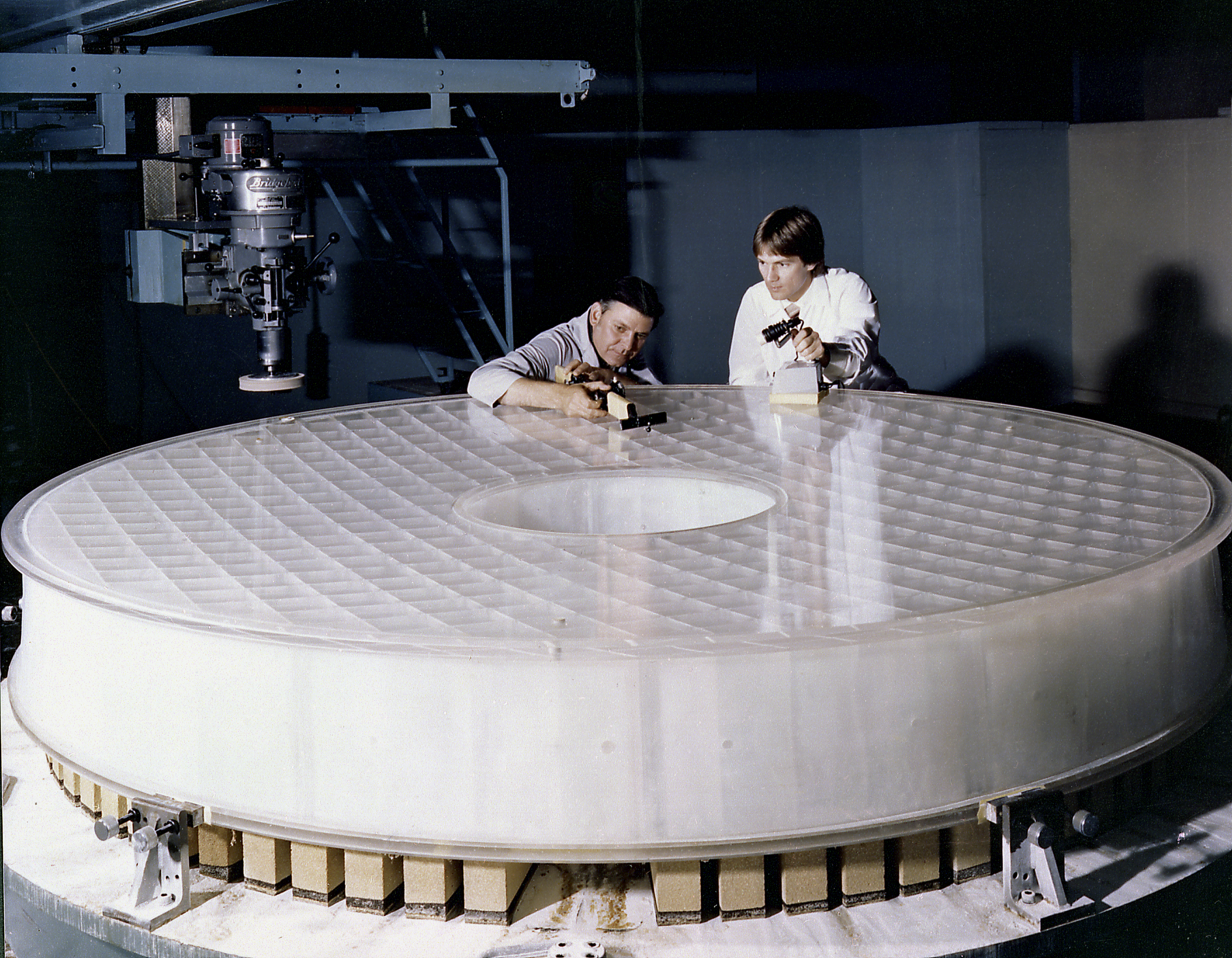
2.4 meter fused quartz mirror of the Hubble Space Telescope

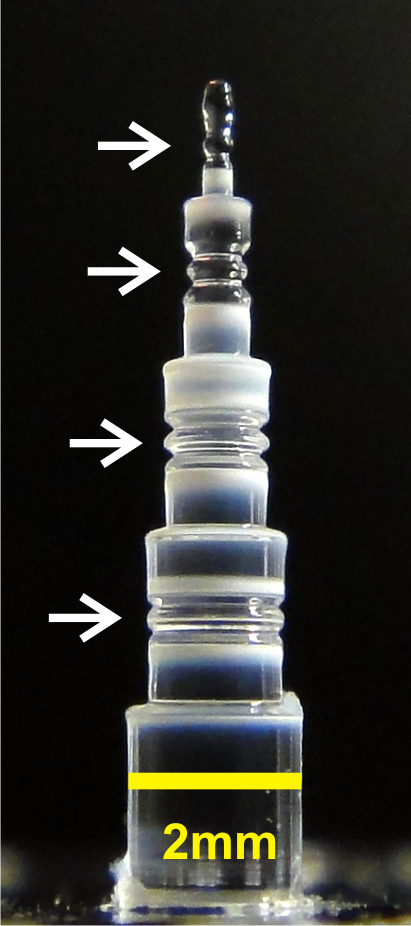
Fused quartz laser cavities for comb frequency generation

Many optical applications of fused quartz exploit its wide transparency range, which can extend well into the ultraviolet and into the near-mid infrared. Fused quartz is the key starting material for optical fiber, used for telecommunications.

Because of its strength and high melting point (compared to ordinary glass), fused quartz is used as an envelope for halogen lamps and high-intensity discharge lamps, which must operate at a high envelope temperature to achieve their combination of high brightness and long life. Some high-power vacuum tubes used silica envelopes whose good transmission at infrared wavelengths facilitated radiation cooling of their incandescent anodes.

Because of its physical strength, fused quartz was used in deep diving vessels such as the bathysphere and benthoscope and in the windows of crewed spacecraft, including the Space Shuttle and International Space Station. Fused quartz was used also in composite armour development.

In the semiconductor industry, its combination of strength, thermal stability, and UV transparency makes it an excellent substrate for projection masks for photolithography.

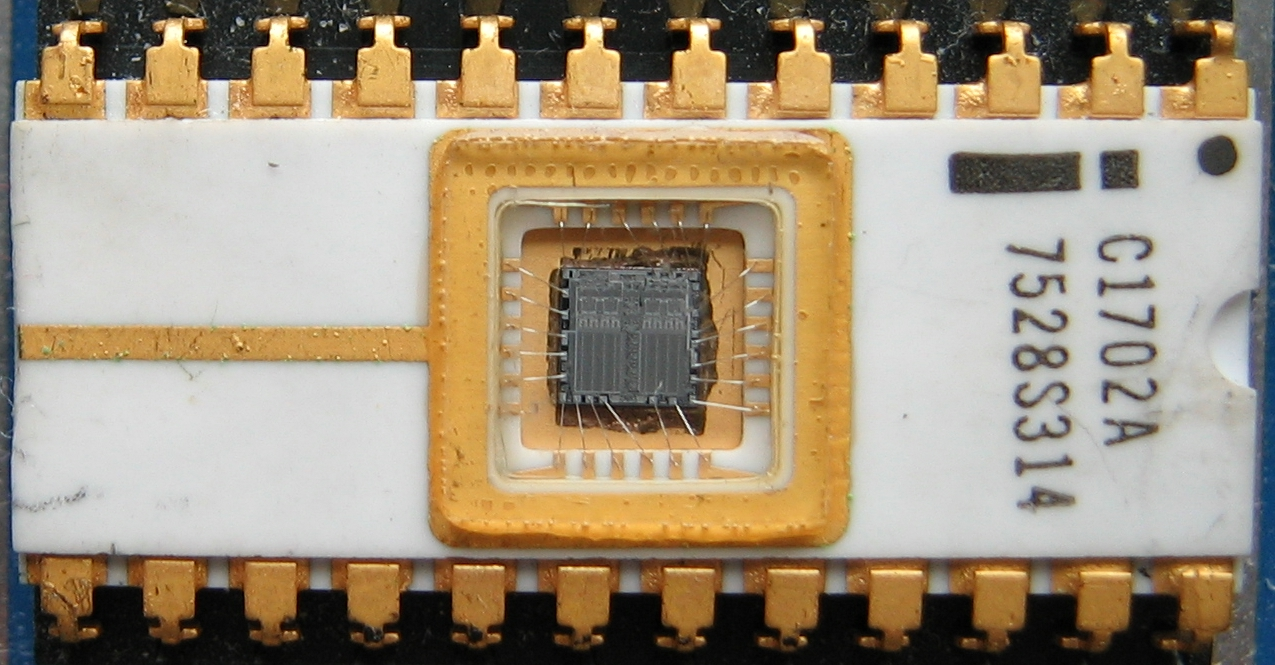
An EPROM with fused quartz window in the top of the package

Its UV transparency also finds use as windows on EPROMs (erasable programmable read-only memory), a type of non-volatile memory chip which is erased by exposure to strong ultraviolet light. EPROMs are recognizable by the transparent fused quartz (although some later models use UV-transparent resin) window which sits on top of the package, through which the silicon chip is visible, and which transmits UV light for erasing.

Due to the thermal stability and composition, it is used in 5D optical data storage and in semiconductor fabrication furnaces.

Fused quartz has nearly ideal properties for fabricating first surface mirrors such as those used in telescopes. The material behaves in a predictable way and allows the optical fabricator to put a very smooth polish onto the surface and produce the desired figure with fewer testing iterations. In some instances, a high-purity UV grade of fused quartz has been used to make several of the individual uncoated lens elements of special-purpose lenses including the Zeiss 105 mm f/4.3 UV Sonnar, a lens formerly made for the Hasselblad camera, and the Nikon UV-Nikkor 105 mm f/4.5 (presently sold as the Nikon PF10545MF-UV) lens. These lenses are used for UV photography, as the quartz glass can be transparent at much shorter wavelengths than lenses made with more common flint or crown glass formulas.

Fused quartz can be metallised and etched for use as a substrate for high-precision microwave circuits, the thermal stability making it a good choice for narrowband filters and similar demanding applications. The lower dielectric constant than alumina allows higher impedance tracks or thinner substrates, but the very low thermal conductivity limits usage in high-power circuits.

=== Refractory material applications ===
Fused quartz as an industrial raw material is used to make various refractory shapes such as crucibles, trays, shrouds, and rollers for many high-temperature thermal processes including steelmaking, investment casting, and glass manufacture. Refractory shapes made from fused quartz have excellent thermal shock resistance and are chemically inert to most elements and compounds, including virtually all acids, regardless of concentration, except hydrofluoric acid, which is very reactive even in fairly low concentrations. Translucent fused-quartz tubes are commonly used to sheathe electric elements in room heaters, industrial furnaces, and other similar applications.

Owing to its low mechanical damping at ordinary temperatures, it is used for high-Q resonators, in particular, for wine-glass resonator of hemispherical resonator gyro. For the same reason fused quartz is also the material used for modern glass instruments such as the glass harp and the verrophone, and is also used for new builds of the historical glass harmonica, giving these instruments a greater dynamic range and a clearer sound than with the historically used lead crystal.

Quartz glassware is occasionally used in chemistry laboratories when standard borosilicate glass cannot withstand high temperatures or when high UV transmission is required. The cost of production is significantly higher, limiting its use; it is usually found as a single basic element, such as a tube in a furnace, or as a flask, the elements in direct exposure to the heat.

== Properties of fused quartz ==
The extremely low coefficient of thermal expansion, about 5.5×10^{−7}/K (20–320 °C), accounts for its remarkable ability to undergo large, rapid temperature changes without cracking (see thermal shock).

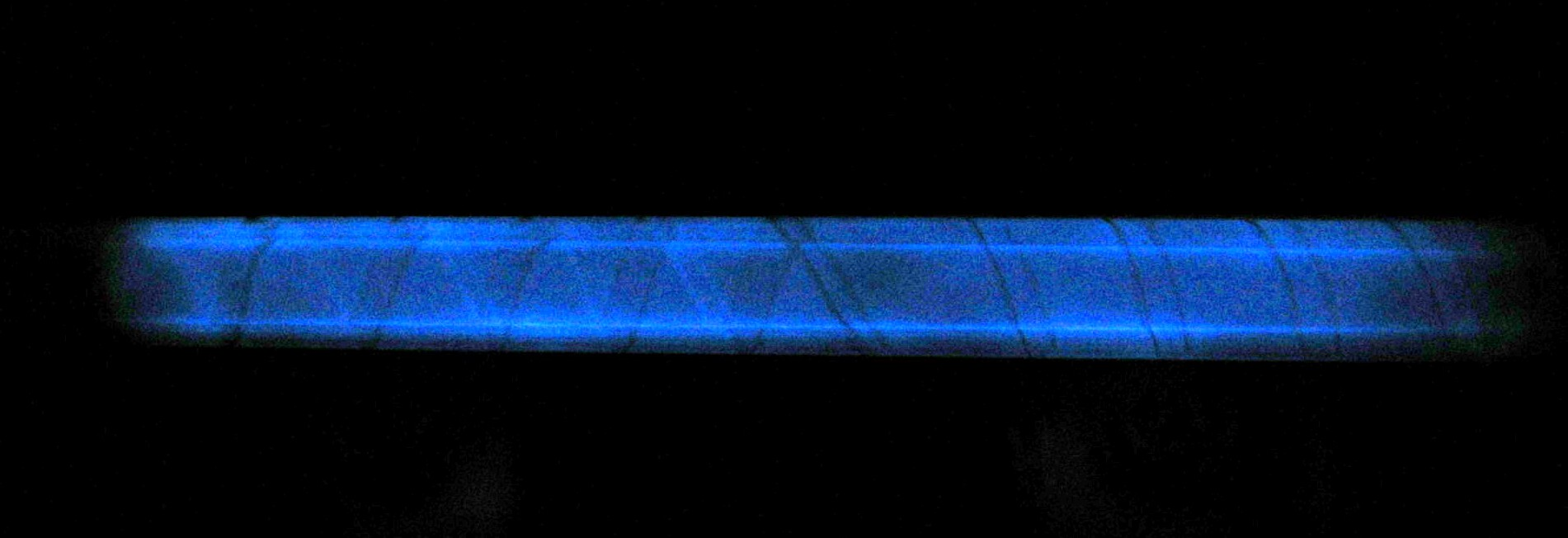
Phosphorescence in fused quartz from an extremely intense pulse of UV light in a flashtube, centered at 170 nm

Fused quartz is prone to phosphorescence and "solarisation" (purplish discoloration) under intense UV illumination, as is often seen in flashtubes. "UV grade" synthetic fused silica (sold under various tradenames including "HPFS", "Spectrosil", and "Suprasil") has a very low metallic impurity content making it transparent deeper into the ultraviolet. An optic with a thickness of 1 cm has a transmittance around 50% at a wavelength of 170 nm, which drops to only a few percent at 160 nm. However, its infrared transmission is limited by strong water absorptions at 2.2 μm and 2.7 μm.

"Infrared grade" fused quartz (tradenames "Infrasil", "Vitreosil IR", and others), which is electrically fused, has a greater presence of metallic impurities, limiting its UV transmittance wavelength to around 250 nm, but a much lower water content, leading to excellent infrared transmission up to 3.6 μm wavelength. All grades of transparent fused quartz/fused silica have nearly identical mechanical properties.

=== Refractive index ===
The optical dispersion of fused quartz can be approximated by the following Sellmeier equation:

$$\varepsilon=n^2=1+\frac{0.6961663\lambda^2}{\lambda^2-0.0684043^2}+\frac{0.4079426\lambda^2}{\lambda^2-0.1162414^2} + \frac{0.8974794\lambda^2}{\lambda^2-9.896161^2},$$

where the wavelength $\lambda$ is measured in micrometers. This equation is valid between 0.21 and 3.71 μm and at 20 °C. Its validity was confirmed for wavelengths up to 6.7 μm. Experimental data for the real (refractive index) and imaginary (absorption index) parts of the complex refractive index of fused quartz reported in the literature over the spectral range from 30 nm to 1000 μm have been reviewed by Kitamura et al. and are available online.

Its quite high Abbe Number of 67.8 makes it among the lowest dispersion glasses at visible wavelengths, as well as having an exceptionally low refractive index in the visible (n_{d} = 1.4585). Note that fused quartz has a very different and lower refractive index compared to crystalline quartz which is birefringent with refractive indices n_{o} = 1.5443 and n_{e} = 1.5534 at the same wavelength. Although these forms have the same chemical formula, their differing structures result in different optical and other physical properties.

=== List of physical properties ===
- Density: 2.203 g/cm^{3}
- Hardness: 5.3–6.5 (Mohs scale), 8.8 GPa
- Tensile strength: 48.3 MPa
- Compressive strength: > 1.1 GPa
- Bulk modulus: ~37 GPa
- Rigidity modulus: 31 GPa
- Young's modulus: 71.7 GPa
- Poisson's ratio: 0.17
- Lamé elastic constants: λ = 15.87 GPa, μ = 31.26 GPa
- Coefficient of thermal expansion: 5.5 × 10^{−7}/K (average 20–320 °C)
- Thermal conductivity: 1.3 W/(m·K)
- Specific heat capacity: 45.3 J/(mol·K)
- Softening point: ≈ 1665 °C
- Annealing point: ≈ 1140 °C
- Strain point: 1070 °C
- Electrical resistivity: > 10^{18} Ω·m
- Dielectric constant: 3.75 at 20 °C 1 MHz
- Dielectric loss factor: less than 0.0004 at 20 °C 1 MHz typically 6 × 10^{−5} at 10 GHz
- Dielectric strength: 250–400 kV/cm at 20 °C
- Magnetic susceptibility: −11.28 × 10^{−6} (SI, 22 °C)
- Hamaker constant: A = 6.5 × 10^{−20} J.
- Surface tension: 0.300 N/m at 1800–2400 °C
- Index of refraction: n_{d} = 1.4585 (at 587.6 nm)
- Change of refractive index with temperature: 1.28 × 10^{−5}/K (20–30 °C)
- Transmission range: Cutoff – 160 to 5000 nm, with a deep absorption band at 2730 nm. Best transmittance – 180 to 2700 nm.
- Stress-optic coefficients: p_{11} = 0.113, p_{12} = 0.252.
- Abbe number: Vd = 67.82

== See also ==
- Amorphous solid
- Borosilicate glass
- Data storage
- Optical fiber
- Quartz fiber
- Structure of liquids and glasses
- Vycor
