= Igor Grekhov =

Soviet and Russian physicist and electrical engineer (1934–2026)

- Игорь Грехов
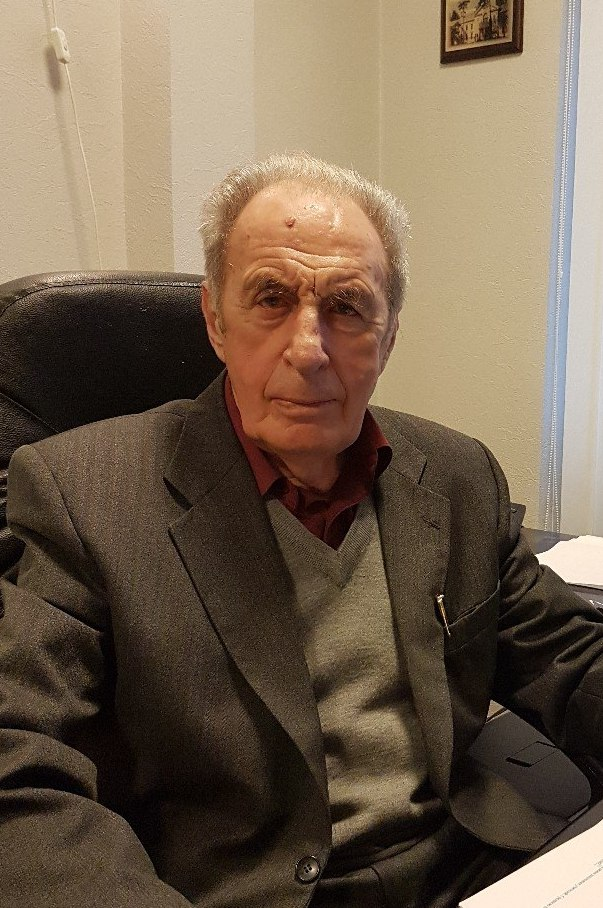
- Grekhov in 2017
- Born: 10 September 1934; Smolensk, Western Oblast, Russian SFSR, Soviet Union
- Died: 30 August 2026 (aged 91); Saint Petersburg, Russia
- Citizenship: Russia
- Education: Bauman MSTU
- Known for: Contribution to physics and engineering of power semiconductor devices
- Awards: Lenin Prize (1966); USSR State Prize (1987); State Prize of Russia (2002)
- Scientific career
- Fields: Power electronics
- Workplaces: Ioffe Institute
- Doctoral advisor: Vladimir Tuchkevich

External image
- Igor Grekhov (photo)

Igor Vsevolodovich Grekhov (Russian: Игорь Всеволодович Грехов; 10 September 1934 – 30 August 2026) was a Soviet and Russian physicist and electrical engineer, who was a full member of the Russian Academy of Sciences. He is known as one of the founders of the power semiconductor device industry in the Soviet Union. His contributions to the field of pulsed power devices and converter technique were recognized by the awarding of the Lenin Prize, the two State Prizes and several State orders of Russia. He headed the laboratory at the Ioffe Physical Technical Institute in St. Petersburg over several decades.

== Early life and professional career ==
Grekhov was born to a family of schoolteachers in Smolensk, but his childhood passed in the city of Simferopol, Crimea.

After finishing secondary school, Grekhov studied electrical engineering at the Bauman Moscow State Technical University. Then he spent several years (1958–1962) in industry, working as a research engineer and head of the laboratory at the "Electrovipryamitel" factory in Saransk (Mordovian ASSR, USSR).

In 1962, Grekhov joined the Ioffe Institute in Leningrad and was an employee of the Institute for more than half a century, sequentially occupying the positions of a junior, ordinary and senior scientist, a group head and a research-sector head. In 1967 and 1974, he earned, respectively, the Ph.D. and Doktor nauk degrees, both in the physics of semiconductors. In 1982–2019, Grekhov headed the Power electronics laboratory. In the period from 2004 to 2014, he also served as a head of the Solid-State Electronics Department of the Institute. Along with his research activity, he taught a course in Semiconductor devices as a professor of St. Petersburg Polytechnic University (1984–1994).

In 1991 Grekhov was elected to corresponding membership in the Academy of Sciences of the USSR and in 2008 up-ranked to full member in the Russian Academy of Sciences.

== Major achievements ==
Grekhov's research work always concentrated on the physics of solid-state devices, with a special point related to their application in power electronics. His interests covered all the steps from background theoretical studies through a trial sample fabrication up to coordination of mass production of power devices including converters. His pioneering contributions in 1960s and 1970s provided a technological breakthrough for the semiconductor industry and gave birth to its new branch – power semiconductor device engineering – in the Soviet Union.

The most important results are:

- Observation of an effect of a uniform switching of a silicon-based thyristor structure under excitation with YAG:Nd laser pulses, creation of the fast high-power switches (10 kV, 30 kA, 20 ns pulse rise time) relying on this effect;
- Discovery of impact ionization fronts in high-voltage pn-junctions triggered by a steep voltage pulse; this phenomenon is used in the superfast switches, such as avalanche diode sharpeners or fast-ionization dynistors, with the pulse-rise time shorter than 100 ps;
- Inventions (1982–1983) of the new-type opening switch called the Drift Step Recovery Diode (DSRD) capable of operating in the pulse power range from units to hundreds megawatts, and of a Reversely Switch-on Dynistor (RSD) enabling commutation of the MegaAmpere-range currents within tens of microseconds. The most power semiconductor switch employing RSDs is now in use at the Russian Federal Nuclear Center;
- Prediction of a new physical effect of a tunneling-assisted formation of the ionization front in silicon devices. This front was shown to be responsible for an extremely fast (~20 ps) device switching;
- Technical idea of a new device, competitive with IGBT, – the integrated thyristor with the external field-effect control. This device exhibits similar characteristics to those of IGBT but does not require such refined technological facilities to produce;
- Creation of the silicon carbide (SiC) devices for power electronics, particularly of the SiC-based opening switches.

The research in Grekhov’s laboratory includes also some other problems of the semiconductor device physics: tunneling phenomena in MIS-structures, ferroelectric memories, porous silicon and superconductive ceramics.

== Death ==
Grekhov died in Saint Petersburg on 30 August 2026, at the age of 91.

== Awards ==
- 1966 – Lenin Prize
- 1975 – Honoured Inventor of the RSFSR
- 1981 – Order of Friendship of Peoples
- 1987 – USSR State Prize
- 1999 – Order of Honour (Russia)
- 2002 – State Prize of Russia
- 2006 – Russian Government Prize
- 2010 – Order of Friendship (Russia)
- 2010 – St. Petersburg Government Prize
- 2021 – GEA Honorary Diploma
[see sources for details]

== Representative publications ==
- I. V. Grekhov, Pulse power generation in nano- and subnano- second range by means of ionizing fronts in semiconductors: the state of the art and future prospects, IEEE Transactions on Plasma Science, 38:5 (2010), 1118–1123.
- I. V. Grekhov, Power Semiconductor Electronics and Pulse Technology, Herald of the Russian Academy of Sciences, 78:1 (2008), 22–30.
- I. V. Grekhov, G. A. Mesyats, Nanosecond semiconductor diodes for pulsed power switching, Physics-Uspekhi, 48:7 (2005), 703–712.
- P. Rodin, U. Ebert, W. Hundsdorfer, I. Grekhov, Tunneling-assisted impact ionization fronts in semiconductors, Journal of Applied Physics, 92:2 (2002), 958–964.
- I. V. Grekhov, New principles of high power switching with semiconductor devices, Solid-State Electronics, 32:11 (1989), 923–930.

Totally, Grekhov has co-authorized four books, about 200 patents and more than 600 scientific papers.
