= IJC =

IJC may refer to:

- Indian Journal of Chemistry, a journal published by the National Institute of Science Communication and Information Resources
- Infant Jesus Convent, a secondary school for girls in the city of Melaka, Malaysia
- Innova Junior College, a junior college in Singapore
- Intermediate Joint Command, part of the International Security Assistance Force
- International Jewish Correspondence, a pen pals organization
- International Joint Commission, a binational organization established by the United States and Canada
- International Journal of the Commons, an interdisciplinary peer-reviewed open-access journal
- Irish Junior Cup, a knockout trophy played for field hockey clubs in Ireland
- Israeli Juggling Convention, the second-biggest juggling convention in the world
- Ivar Jacobson Consulting, a software consulting company
