= Step recovery diode =

Semiconductor diode producing short impulses

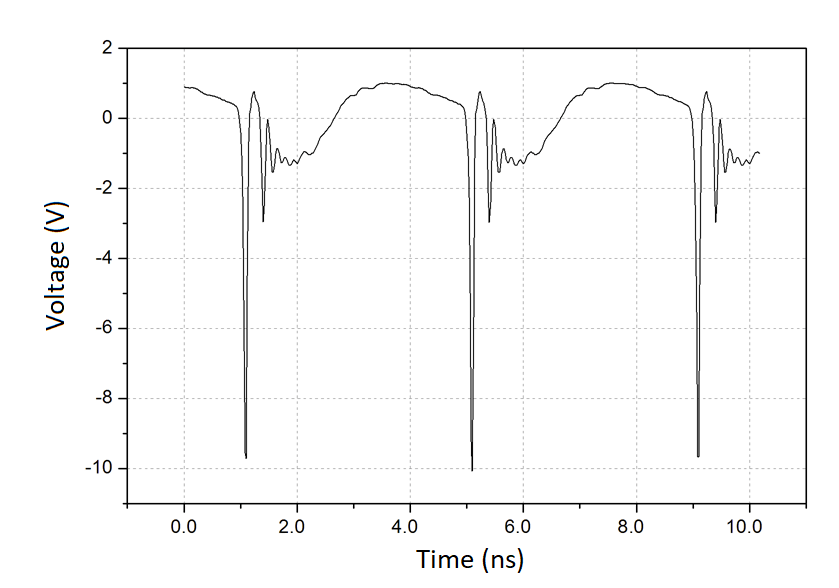
Signal of a SRD frequency comb generator (HP 33003A)

Circuit symbol

In electronics, a step recovery diode (SRD, snap-off diode or charge-storage diode or memory varactor (Note: Used much less frequently)) is a semiconductor junction diode with the ability to generate extremely short pulses. It has a variety of uses in microwave (MHz to GHz range) electronics as pulse generator or parametric amplifier.

When diodes switch from forward conduction to reverse cut-off, a reverse current flows briefly as stored charge is removed. It is the abruptness with which this reverse current ceases which characterises the step recovery diode.

== Historical note ==
The first published paper on the SRD is (Boff, Moll & Shen 1960): the authors start the brief survey stating that "the recovery characteristics of certain types of pn-junction diodes exhibit a discontinuity which may be used to advantage for the generation of harmonics or for the production of millimicrosecond pulses". They also refer that they first observed this phenomenon in February, 1959.

== Operating the SRD ==
=== Physical principles ===
The main phenomenon used in SRDs is the storage of electric charge during forward conduction, which is present in all semiconductor junction diodes and is due to finite lifetime of minority carriers in semiconductors. Assume that the SRD is forward biased and in steady state i.e. the anode bias current does not change with time: since charge transport in a junction diode is mainly due to diffusion, i.e. to a non constant spatial charge carrier density caused by bias voltage, a charge Q_{s} is stored in the device. This stored charge depends on

1. Intensity of the forward anode current I_{A} flowing in the device during its steady state.
2. Minority carrier lifetime τ, i.e. the mean time a free charge carrier moves inside a semiconductor region before recombining.

Quantitatively, if the steady state of forward conduction lasts for a time much greater than τ, the stored charge has the following approximate expression

$$Q_S\cong I_A\cdot\tau$$

Now suppose that the voltage bias abruptly changes, switching from its stationary positive value to a higher magnitude constant negative value: then, since a certain amount of charge has been stored during forward conduction, diode resistance is still low (i.e. the anode-to-cathode voltage V_{AK} has nearly the same forward conduction value). Anode current does not cease but reverses its polarity (i.e. the direction of its flow) and stored charge Q_{s} starts to flow out of the device at an almost constant rate I_{R}. All the stored charge is thus removed in a certain amount of time: this time is the storage time t_{S} and its approximate expression is

$$t_S\cong\frac{Q_S}{I_R}$$

When all stored charge has been removed, diode resistance suddenly changes, rising to its cut-off value at reverse bias within a time t_{Tr}, the transition time: this behavior can be used to produce pulses with rise time equal to this time.

== Operation of the drift step recovery diode (DSRD) ==
The drift step recovery diode (DSRD) was invented by Russian scientists in 1981 (Grekhov et al., 1981). The principle of the DSRD operation is similar to the SRD, with one essential difference - the forward pumping current should be pulsed, not continuous, because drift diodes function with slow carriers.

The principle of DSRD operation can be explained as follows: a short pulse of current is applied in the forward direction of the DSRD effectively "pumping" the P-N junction, or in other words, “charging” the P-N junction capacitively. When the current direction reverses, the accumulated charges are removed from the base region.

As soon as the accumulated charge decreases to zero, the diode opens rapidly. A high voltage spike can appear due to the self-induction of the diode circuit. The larger the commutation current and the shorter the transition from forward to reverse conduction, the higher the pulse amplitude and efficiency of the pulse generator (Kardo-Sysoev et al., 1997).

== Usages ==
- Harmonic generators
  - Local oscillators
  - Voltage-controlled oscillator
  - frequency synthesizers
  - Frequency multiplier
- Comb generator
- Sampling phase detector

== See also ==
- Minority carrier
- P-n junction
- Pulse generator
- Semiconductor diode
