= Shirley Geok-lin Lim =

American poet (born 1944)

Shirley Geok-Lin Lim
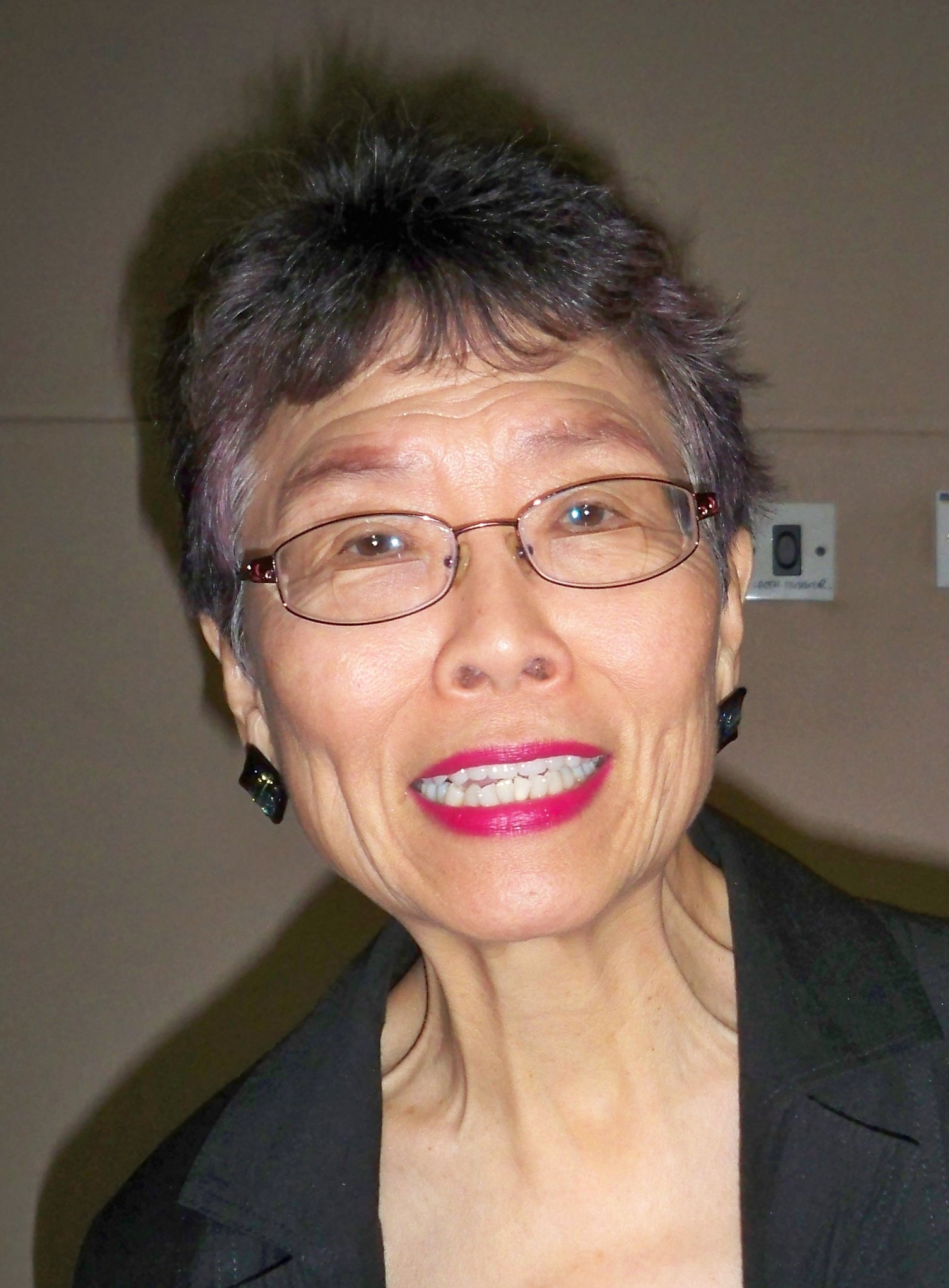
- Lim in 2014
- Born: 1944 (age 81–82) Malacca, British Malaya
- Occupation: Poet, author, and literary critic
- Spouse: Charles Bazerman
- Children: 1

Shirley Geok-lin Lim (born 1944) is an American writer of poetry, fiction, and criticism. She was both the first woman and the first Asian person to be awarded Commonwealth Poetry Prize for her first poetry collection, Crossing The Peninsula, which she published in 1980. In 1997, she received the American Book Award for her memoir, Among the White Moon Faces. In 2020, she received a Lifetime Achievement Award from the Feminist Press at CUNY.

== Biography ==
Lim was born in the state capital of Malacca City and lived with her five brothers, but was abandoned by her mother during childhood.

Her first poem was published in the Malacca Times when she was ten and by the age of eleven, she had decided that she wanted to become a poet.

Lim had her early education at Infant Jesus Convent under the then British colonial education system. She won a federal scholarship to the University of Malaya, where she earned a B.A. first class honors degree in English. In 1969, at the age of twenty-four, she entered graduate school at Brandeis University in Waltham, Massachusetts under a Fulbright scholarship, and received a PhD in English and American Literature in 1973.

== Personal life ==
Shirley Geok-lin Lim is married to Charles Bazerman, a professor at University of California, Santa Barbara. She has one child, named Gershom.

== Career ==
Lim was a professor in the English Department at the University of California, Santa Barbara, as well as being chair of the Women's Studies Department, until her retirement in 2012. She has also taught internationally at the National University of Singapore, the National Institute Education of Nanyang Technological University, and was the Chair Professor at the University of Hong Kong where she also taught poetry and creative writing. She has authored several books of poems, short stories, and criticism, and serves as editor and co-editor of numerous scholarly works. Lim is a cross-genre writer, although she primarily identifies herself as a poet. Her research interests include:

- 20th-century American literature;
- Asian American cultural studies;
- Post-colonial and Southeast Asian literature;
- ethnic and feminist writing and theory; and
- creative writing.

Lim has received numerous literary awards, among which are:

- Fulbright Distinguished Lecturer Award, 1996;
- American Book Award, which she won twice, once with her co-edited anthology, The Forbidden Stitch: An Asian American Women's Anthology (1989), and the second time, with her memoir, Among the White Moon Faces (1997); and
- Asiaweek Short Story award for "Mr. Tang's Uncles" (Feminist Press, 1997)

== Books and articles ==
- Memoir:
  - "Among the White Moon Faces: An Asian American Memoir of Homelands" (1996) (Chinese translation, 2001)
- Fiction:
  - "Joss and Gold" (Feminist Press and Times Books International, 2001)
  - Sister Swing (Marshall Cavendish Editions, 2006)
- Books of Poetry and Short Stories:
  - "Crossing the Peninsula and Other Poems" (1980)
  - "Another Country" (1982)
  - "Life's Mysteries" (1985)
  - "No Man's Grove and Other Poems" (1985)
  - "Modern Secrets: New and Selected Poems" (1989)
  - "Monsoon History" (1994)
  - "Two Dreams: New and Selected Stories" (1997)
  - "What the Fortune Teller Didn't Say" (1998)
  - "Do You Live In?" (2015)
  - "Ars Poetica for the Day" (2015)
  - "In Praise of Limes" (Sungold Editions, 2022)
  - "Dawns Tomorrow" (Sungold Editions, 2024)
- Critical books:
  - "Nationalism and Literature: English-language Writing from the Philippines and Singapore" (1993)
  - "Writing South/East Asia in English" (1994)
- Critical essays:
  - "Decolonizing the Malaysian Mind: Celebrating the Pioneering Achievement of Lloyd Fernando's Cultural Politics" (2018)
  - "Reciprocity and Resilience in the Anthropocene Dying" in This Is How We Come Back Stronger (Feminist Press, 2021)
- Some publications edited or co-edited:
  - "The Forbidden Stitch" (1989)
  - "Approaches to Teaching Kingston's The Woman Warrior" (1991)
  - "One World of Literature" (1992)
  - "Transnational Asia Pacific: Gender, Culture, and the Public Sphere" (1999)
  - "Writing Out of Turn" (Profession, 1999)
  - "Before Its Time, Of Its Time: The Transnational Female Bildungsroman and Kartini's Letters of A Javanese Princess" (Journal of Asian Pacific Communication 9(1&2), 1999)
  - "Asian American Literature: Leavening the Mosaic", in "Contemporary U. S. Literature: Multicultural Perspectives" (U.S. Society & Values, Electronic Journals of the U.S. Department of State (5)1, 2000)
  - "Power, Race, and Gender in Academe: Strangers in the Tower?" (MLA Press, 2000)
  - "Tilting the Continent: Southeast Asian American Writing" (2000)
  - "English-Language Creative Writing in Hong Kong: Colonial Stereotype and Process," in Pedagogy 1(1) (Duke U P, Winter 2000)
  - "The Center Can(not) Hold: U.S. Women's Studies and Global Feminism" (American Studies International 38(3), October 2000)
  - "The Futures for Hong Kong English", co-authored with Kingsley Bolton (World Englishes 19(3) Special Issue, Hong Kong English: Autonomy and Creativity, November 2000)
  - "Transnational Americans: Asian Pacific American Literature of Anamnesia" (Journal of American Studies 32(2), Winter 2000)
  - "Global Asia as Post-Legitimation: A Response to Ambroise Kom's 'Knowledge and Legitimation'". Mots Pluriels. (June 2000)
  - "Old Paradigms, New Differences: Comparative American studies", in Cultural Encounters (Stauffenburg Verlag, Spring 2000)
  - "Complications of Feminist and Ethnic Literary Theories in Asian American Literature", in "Challenging Boundaries: Gender and Periodization" (University of Georgia P, 2000)
  - Foreword to "Asian American Autobiographers: A Bio-bibliographical Critical Sourcebook" (Greenwood Press, 2001)
  - "The Columbia Companion to the 20th Century American Short Story". David Wong Louie. (Columbia U P, 2001)
  - "A Woman’s Work: Editing and Narrating Memoirs at the Feminist Press: Interview with Florence Howe, New York, June 2011" (Women's Studies Quarterly 50(3/4), Fall/Winter 2022)
