= St. Francis' Institution =

Location
- Parameswara Road; Christian; Malacca City, Malaysia, Malacca, 75000; Malaysia
- Coordinates: 2.191186°N 102.252913°E

Information
- Type: All boys school
- Motto: Latin: Age quod agis (Whatever you do, do it well)
- Religious affiliation: Christian
- Denomination: Roman Catholic Church
- Established: 1880
- School district: Central Malacca
- Principal: Lee Soon Luwi
- Grades: Form 1-5
- Gender: Male
- Enrolment: 800
- Campus: Urban
- Colours: Green and White
- Yearbook: The Franciscan
- Website: thefranciscan.org
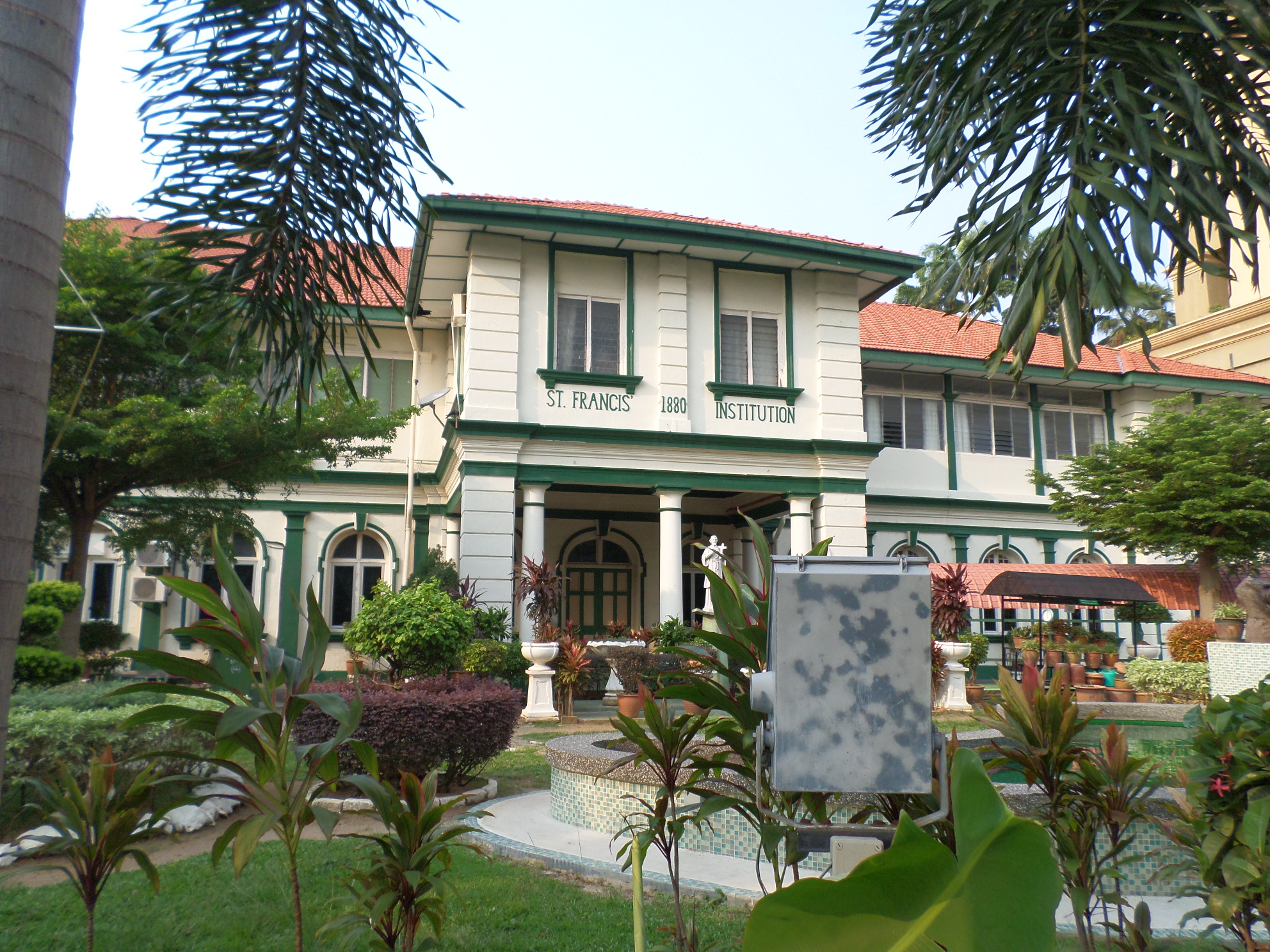

St. Francis' Institution is a public all-boys school in Malacca, Malaysia with La Sallian tradition. It is called 'SFI' by the local population. Alumni or Old Boys, are known as 'Franciscans' or 'Lasallians'.

== List of Brother Directors ==
- 1901 - 1903: Bro. Maurice Joseph
- 1903 - 1911: Bro. Alman Dositheus
- 1911 - 1913: Bro. Lewis Edward
- 1914 - 1916: Bro. Claude-Marie
- 1916 - 1918: Bro. Lewis Edward
- 1918 - 1920: Bro. V. Augustus
- 1920 - 1921: Bro. Lewis Edward
- 1921 - 1923: Bro. Claude-Marie
- 1923 - 1929: Bro. Barnitus Kennedy
- 1930 - 1931: Bro. Defendant Louis
- 1931 - 1936: Bro. Dominic John
- 1936 - 1947: Bro. V. Augustus
- 1948 - 1953: Bro. Edmund McCullagh
- 1953 - 1956: Bro. T. Michael
- 1956: Bro. Patrick Donovan (Acting, ad interim)
- 1956 - 1958: Bro. Leonard Aloysius
- 1959 - 1962: Bro. Alban De Rozario
- 1962 - 1965: Bro. Anthony McNamara
- 1966 - 1968: Bro. Edwin Cheng
- 1969 - 1971: Bro. Phillip Daly
- 1972 - 1975: Bro. Cassian Pappu
- 1976 - 1988: Bro. Harold Reynolds
- 1988–present: Bro. Ambrose Loke (concurrently served as principal until his retirement in 1999/2000, now only serves as the school's ex-officio Brother Director)

== List of Principals ==
- 2001 - 2009: Ong Cheong Wee (first lay principal after Brother Ambrose's retirement in 1999/2000)
- 2009 - 2011: Chong Chew Yoong (Acting principal)
- 2011 - 2014: Lee Bun Chuan
- 2014 - 2019: Lee Chee Choon
- 2019 - 2021: Cheong Lee Chin
- 2022–present: Lee Soon Luwi

== See also ==
- Education in Malaysia
