= Catholic High School, Melaka =

- Sekolah Menengah Jenis Kebangsaan Katholik, Melaka

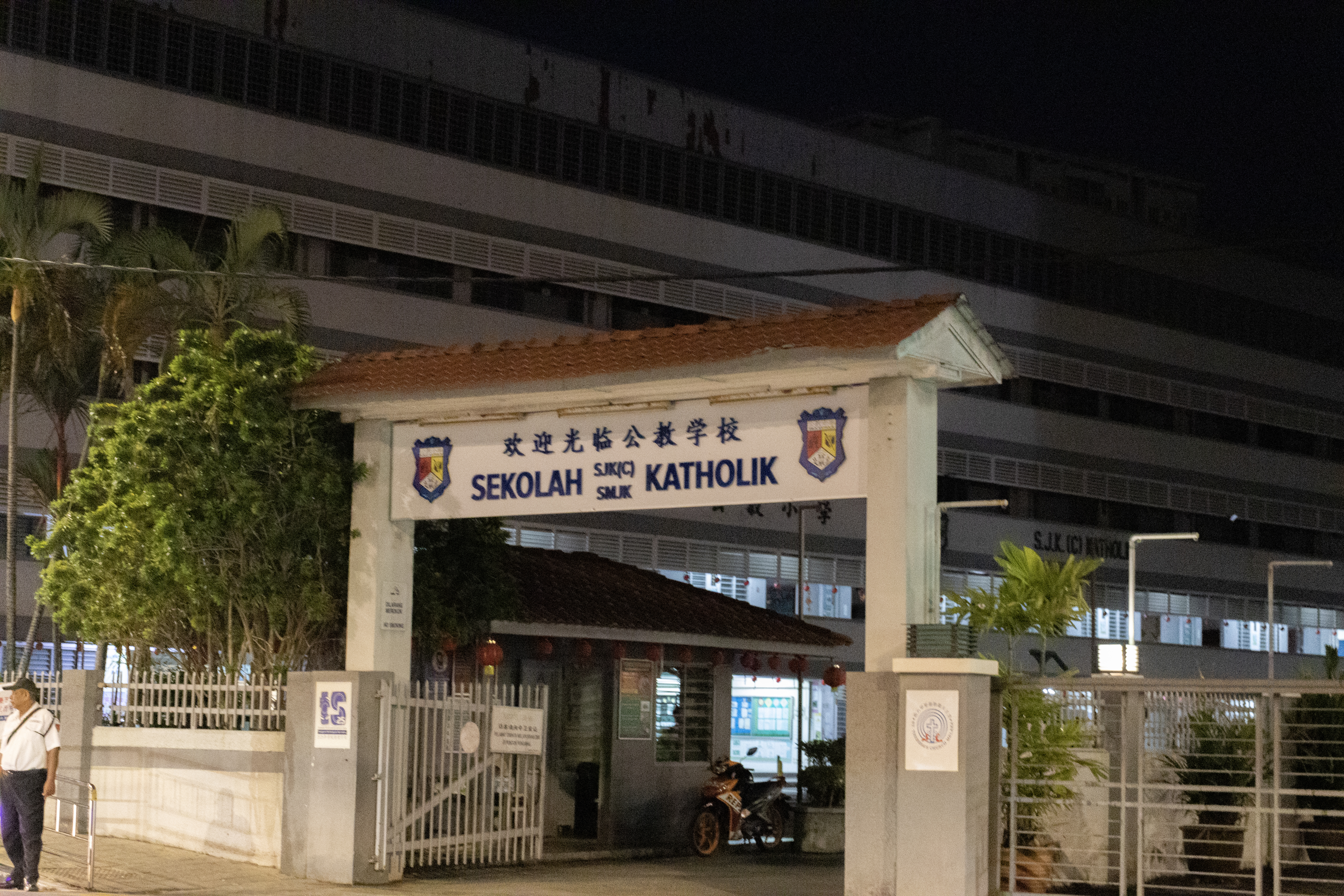
- School entrance

Location
- 251, Jalan Gajah Berang; Kampung Tujuh; Malacca City, Malacca, 75200; Malaysia
- Coordinates: 2.20666°N 102.242°E

Information
- Other name: CHS Melaka
- Former name: St. Francis Catholic Chinese High School
- Type: National-type Chinese secondary school
- Motto: Chinese: 亲爱忠诚 (Intimate, loving, loyal, sincere)
- Established: 4 January 1958; 68 years ago
- Founder: Marist Brothers
- School board: Lembaga Pengelola Sekolah SMJK Katholik Melaka
- School district: Central Malacca
- Educational authority: PPD Melaka Tengah
- School code: MEB2099
- Chairman: Thomas Chong Tet Fook
- Principal: Lai Swee Ho
- Teaching staff: 61
- Forms: 1–5
- Gender: Male
- Age range: 13–18
- Enrollment: 705 (June 2022)
- Language: Mandarin, Malay, English
- Campus type: Urban
- Houses: Red, Blue, Yellow, Green
- Colors: Blue, cyan, red, yellow and white
- Slogan: Chinese: 勤学业、重功德、富理想 (Knowledgeable, Ethical, Aspirant)
- Song: Lagu Sekolah SMJK Katholik
- Yearbook: 烈焰 Semarak
- Website: https://mkkatholik.smjk.edu.my, https://www.chsmelaka.com/
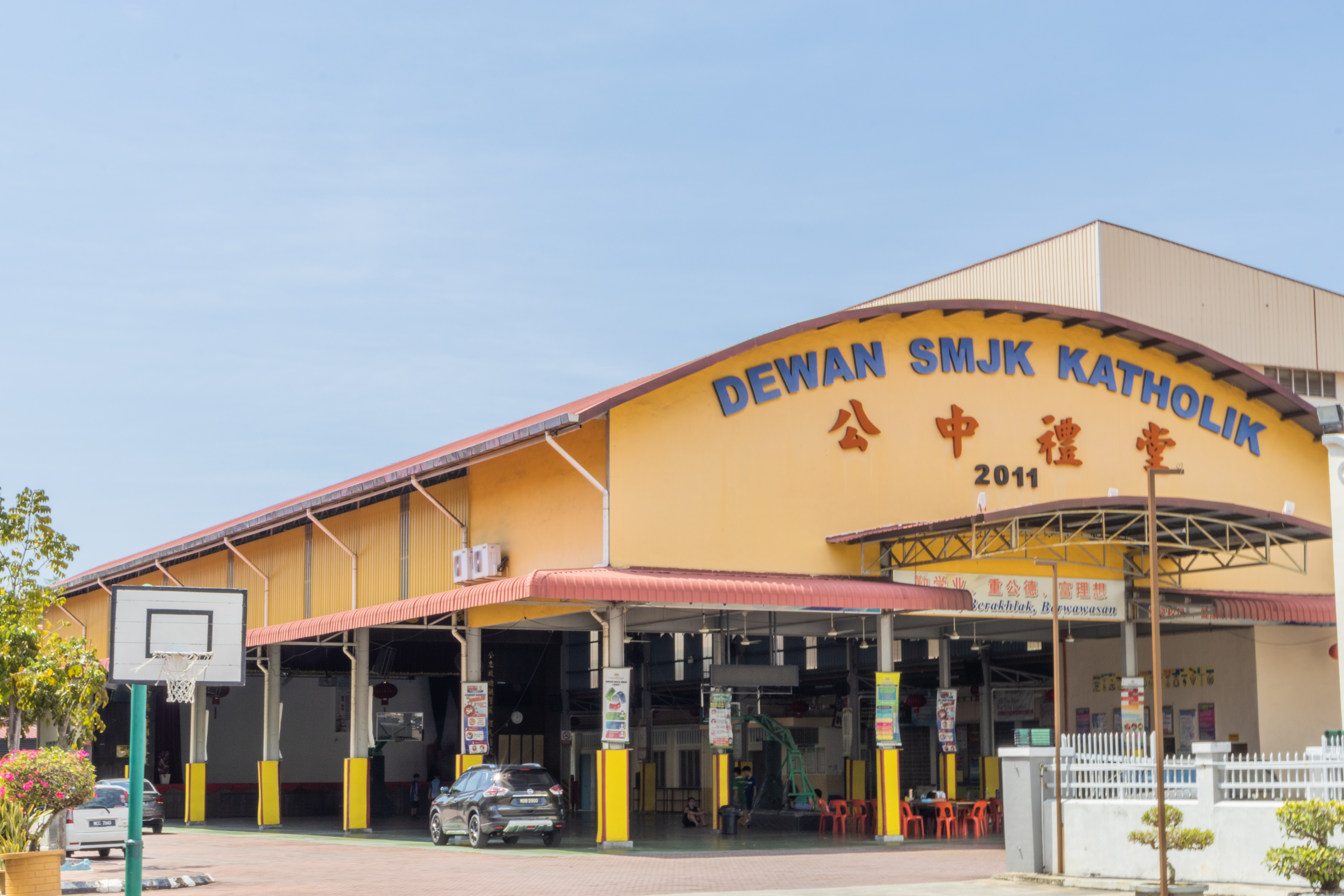
- Last updated: 19 February 2023

Catholic High School, Melaka (CHS Melaka) or Sekolah Menengah Jenis Kebangsaan Katholik, Melaka (Chinese: 马六甲公教国民型华文中学) is a state National-type Chinese secondary boys' school in Malacca City, Malacca, Malaysia. The school is located at Gajah Berang Road with Notre Dame Convent and Gajah Berang Secondary School.

== Governance ==
The school is semi state-funded, the government is only responsible for the salaries of teaching staff and administrative expenses. The school grounds are owned and managed by the school board, which is independent of the government, and the cost of school development and maintenance is dependent on community donations.

== Foundation ==
On 4 January 1958, the school known as St. Francis Catholic Chinese High School (Sekolah Tinggi Cina St. Francis) was officially established by the Marist Brothers, following a decision made by the St. Francis Chinese School in late December 1957 to launch a Form 1 class in January 1958.

The school began with two transition classes made up of 71 students, both boys and girls, formerly from the Catholic Elementary School.

In November 1958, the foundation stone was officially laid by the Governor of Malacca, Leong Yew Koh.

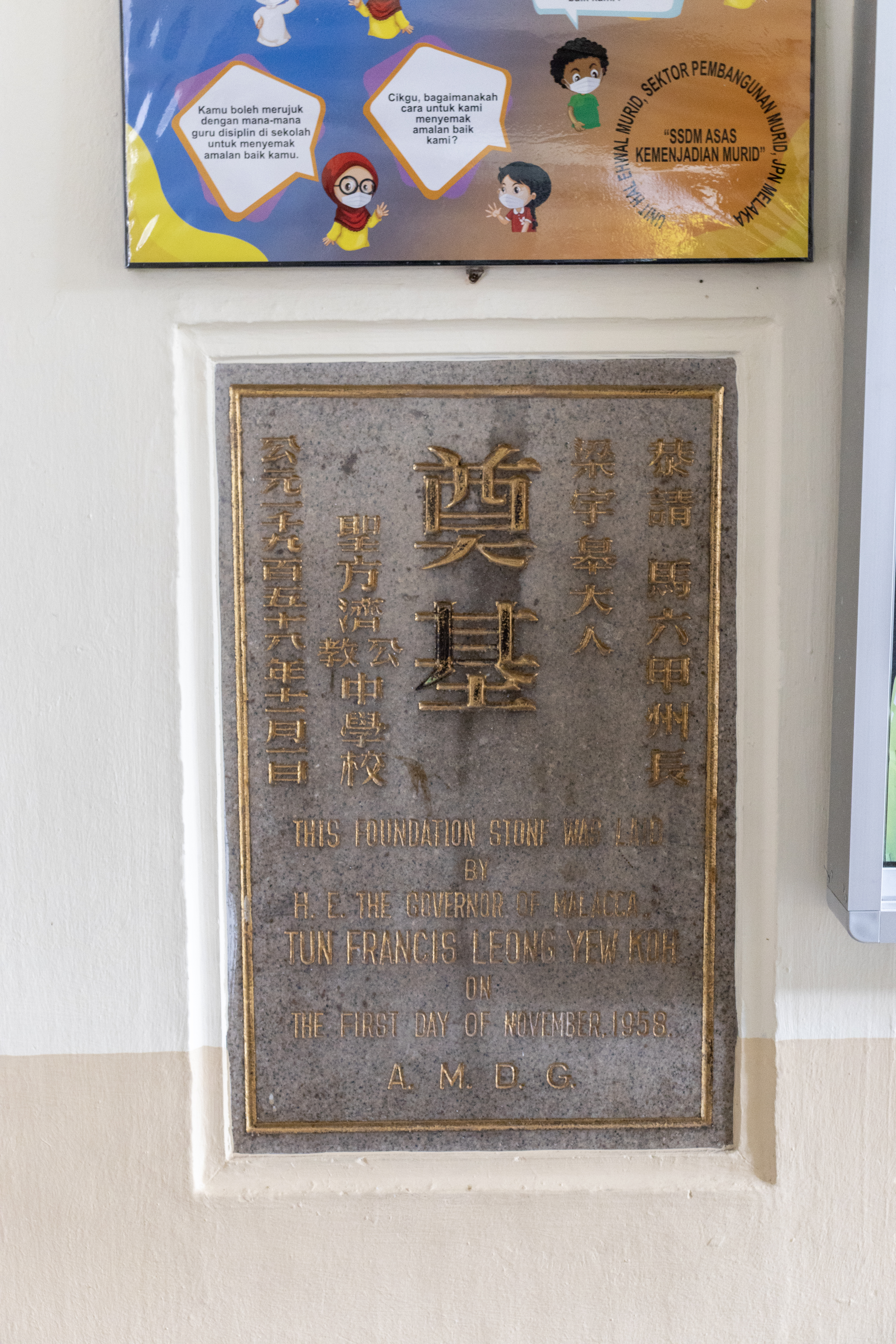
Foundation stone.

In 1959, Block A, consisting of 8 classrooms, was completed. The construction was funded by the Catholic Church.

On 30 January 1960, the school organised a charity bazaar to raise funds for a science laboratory, with the opening ceremony officiated by Tan Cheng Lock who cut the ribbon. Lottery tickets were sold to support the fundraising campaign. The science laboratories were completed by the end of December 1959.

In 1961, Block B—comprising 3 classrooms and 3 science laboratories—was completed and officially opened by the Director of Education, R.A. Wilson. On 1 April 1961, the school changed its name to Sekolah Tinggi Katholik, Melaka. That same year, its students sat for the LCE (Lower Certificate of Education) examination for the first time.

In March 1962, Block C, comprising 9 classrooms and a library, was completed.

In 1985, construction began on a new four-storey block that included the principal's office, teachers' room, library, screening room, and 8 classrooms. This block was designed for shared use by both the secondary and primary schools.

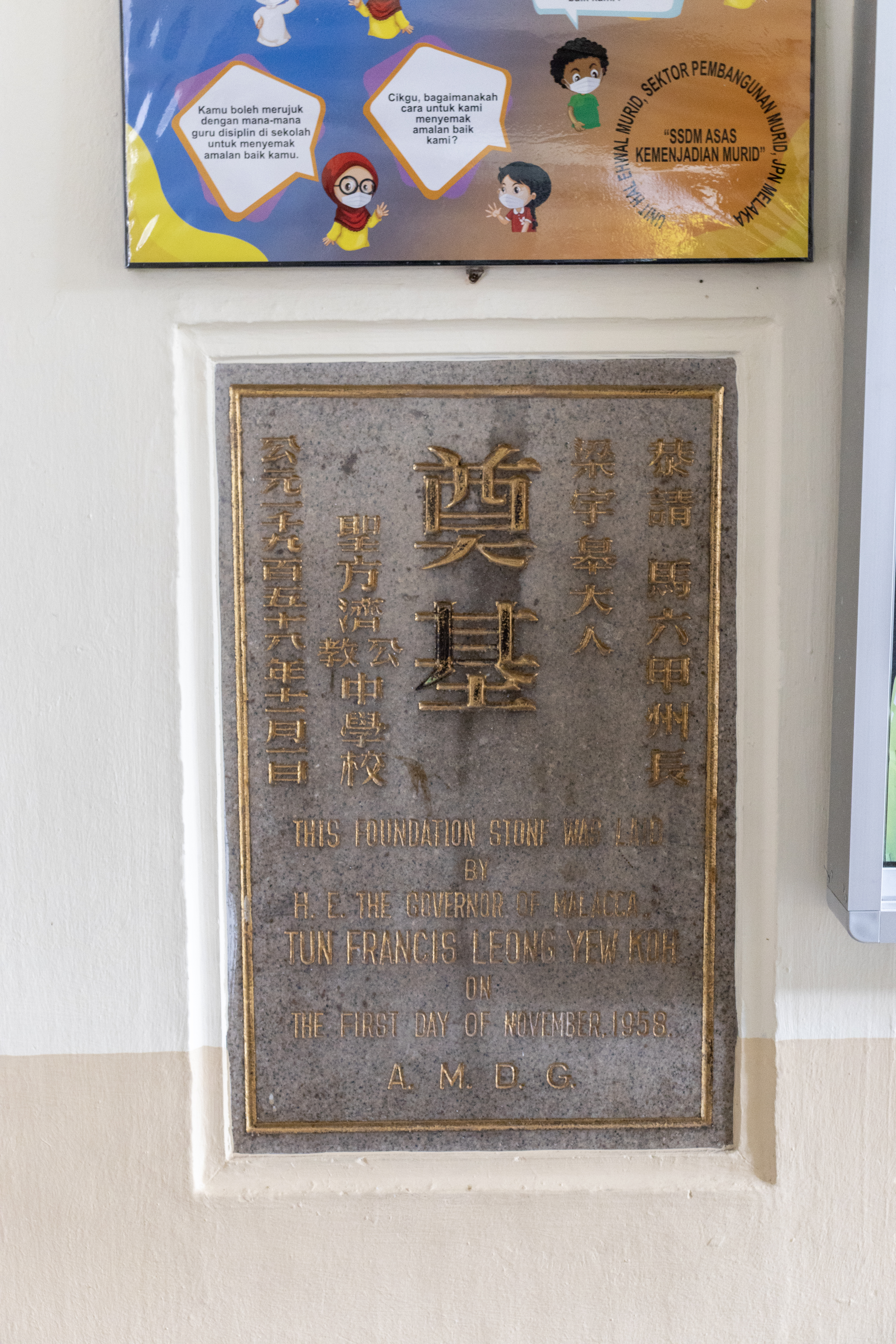
Foundation stone.

== Development ==
In 1999, the number of students increased to more than 1,000 people.

In 2001, computer classes were introduced. The SMK Alumni Association donated MYR10,000 to purchase 10 computers.

On 20 April 2008, in conjunction with the 50th anniversary celebration, a dinner was held to collect donations for the development of basic school facilities. The collection revenue amounted to approximately MYR100,000.

On 21 October 2010, the school governing board, parent–teacher association, alumni association, and the school—together with Nanyang Press group and Carlsberg—held a charity dinner concert to collect donations for the multi-purpose school hall construction fund. Almost MYR1 million was collected.

On 30 July 2011, the multi-purpose hall was completed. In December 2013, the school upgraded its science laboratories and guidance and counseling unit.

In December 2015, the 21st Century Classroom was established with support from the school governing board, parent–teacher association, and alumni association.

In 2017, the school was approved by the Malaysian Ministry of Education to implement the Dual Language Programme.

On 15 March 2018, several alumni were stopped from entering the school to retrieve their Sijil Pelajaran Malaysia results due to having dyed hair, which violated school rules. On 25 May 2018, in collaboration with Tiger Company, the school held a charity dinner concert to raise funds for the installation of a 'Smart Classroom'. The event raised MYR571,660. In November 2018, the school library was upgraded.

In 2019, the school received a special allocation of MYR400,000. On 12 April 2019, the 'Smart Classroom' programme was officially launched across the school.

On 23 January 2023, the school hosted a dinner to celebrate its 65th anniversary, attended by many alumni, including members from the first and second batch. In September 2023, a Mid-Autumn Festival night show was held in conjunction with the 65th anniversary. It was the 37th show since the last in 1986. Also in September 2023, the school, with sponsorship from the Kota Melaka Parliament People's Service Center and cooperation from the parent–teacher association, provided tutoring classes to eight schools, with more than 50 students participating.

On 26 January 2024, the school received a grant of MYR20,000.

== Curriculum ==
The school taught mathematics and science subjects fully in English language. The use of English as the medium of teaching was agreed by parents.

== Extracurricular activities ==
=== Music ===
The school wind band was founded in November 1971. On 1 August 2014, the school partnered with Taiwan Zhongxin High School to present a concert at Pay Teck School hall. In 2018, a music concert played by the band at Pay Fong High School reached 2,000 audience. On 2 June 2023, the school wind band collaborated with the orchestras of four schools to perform a concert. On 9 December 2023, a concert was organized at Chung Kuo Primary School with the intent to collect funds on the music instruments. On 24 August 2024, a music concert played at Chung Kuo Primary School reached 1,000 audience. The band performed on the 2024 Malaysian Independence Day parade in the state.

=== Athletics ===
A basketball championship for Chinese-conforming national secondary school, joined by 28 schools from 12 states, was held at the school from 29 to 31 May 2023. The school boys team won the championship.

=== Literature ===
On 22 June 2024, a Chinese performance poetry competition for students from high schools in the state was hosted by the school.

== School staff ==
Principal
Marie Valentin	1 January 1958 – 31 December 1958
Francis Kerk	1 January 1959 – 31 August 1960
Albert Tien	1 January 1960 – 31 December 1965
Paul Auguste	1 January 1966 – 31 December 1966
Anthony Cheng T. C.	1 January 1967 – 17 July 1969
Paul Clet	18 July 1969 – 31 December 1970
Paul Lim Han Chi	1 January 1971 – 30 June 1973
Joachim Heng	1 July 1973 – 31 December 1973
Paul Lim	1 January 1974 – 28 February 1974
Michael Lim	1 March 1974 – 31 December 1981
Anthony Cheng C. Y.	1 January 1982 – 31 December 1983
Thomas Chin Hon Man	1 January 1984 – 31 December 1995
Song Kuan Kong	1 January 1996 – 15 January 1998
Tan See Boon	16 January 1998 – 4 June 2001
Ng Siew Hong	5 June 2001 – 4 May 2008
Lim Hiang Lam	16 October 2008 – 31 December 2020
Lai Swee Ho	1 March 2021 – present

== Notable alumni ==
- Sim Tong Him, local Member of Parliament
- Chua Tian Chang, former Minister of Works
- Chua Kaw Bing, discoverer of Nipah virus

== Affiliated schools ==
In 1950s and 1960s, the Marist Brothers, following its previous efforts in founding schools in Singapore and Kuala Lumpur (subsequently Petaling Jaya), then expanded their mission by founding additional schools across Malaya and the North Borneo States (now Malaysia), including in Bentong (1957), Sibu (1960), and Tanjung Malim (1960). To this day, the schools in Singapore, Petaling Jaya, Melaka, and Sibu continue to share the same school anthem, with only the opening phrase adapted to reflect their respective locations, namely ‘公教中学 屹立星洲’ (Singapore), ‘公教中学 屹立雪州’ (Petaling Jaya), ‘公教中学 屹立甲州’ (Melaka), and ‘公教中学 屹立砂州’ (Sibu).

== Gallery ==
Emblem.

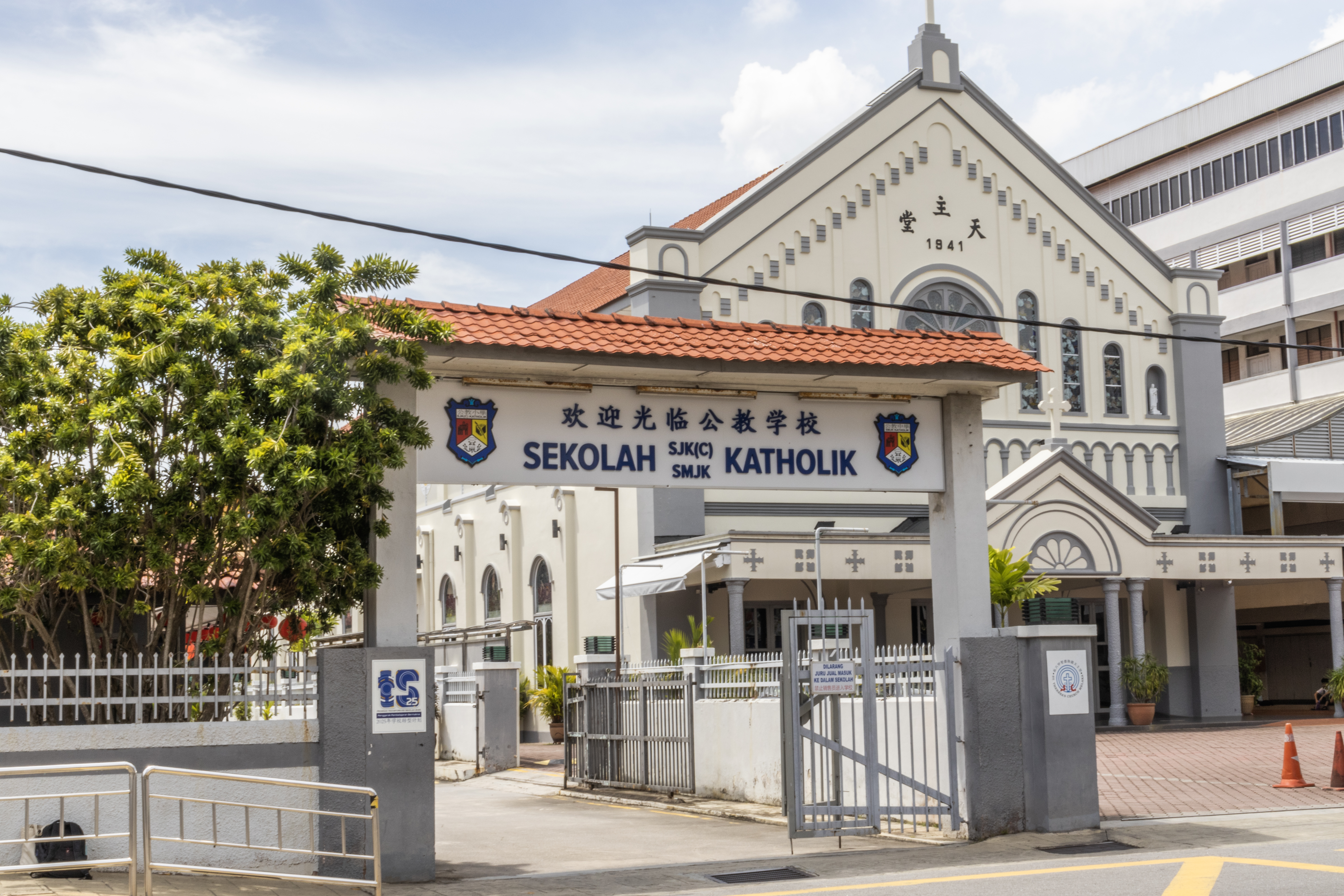
Front entrance.

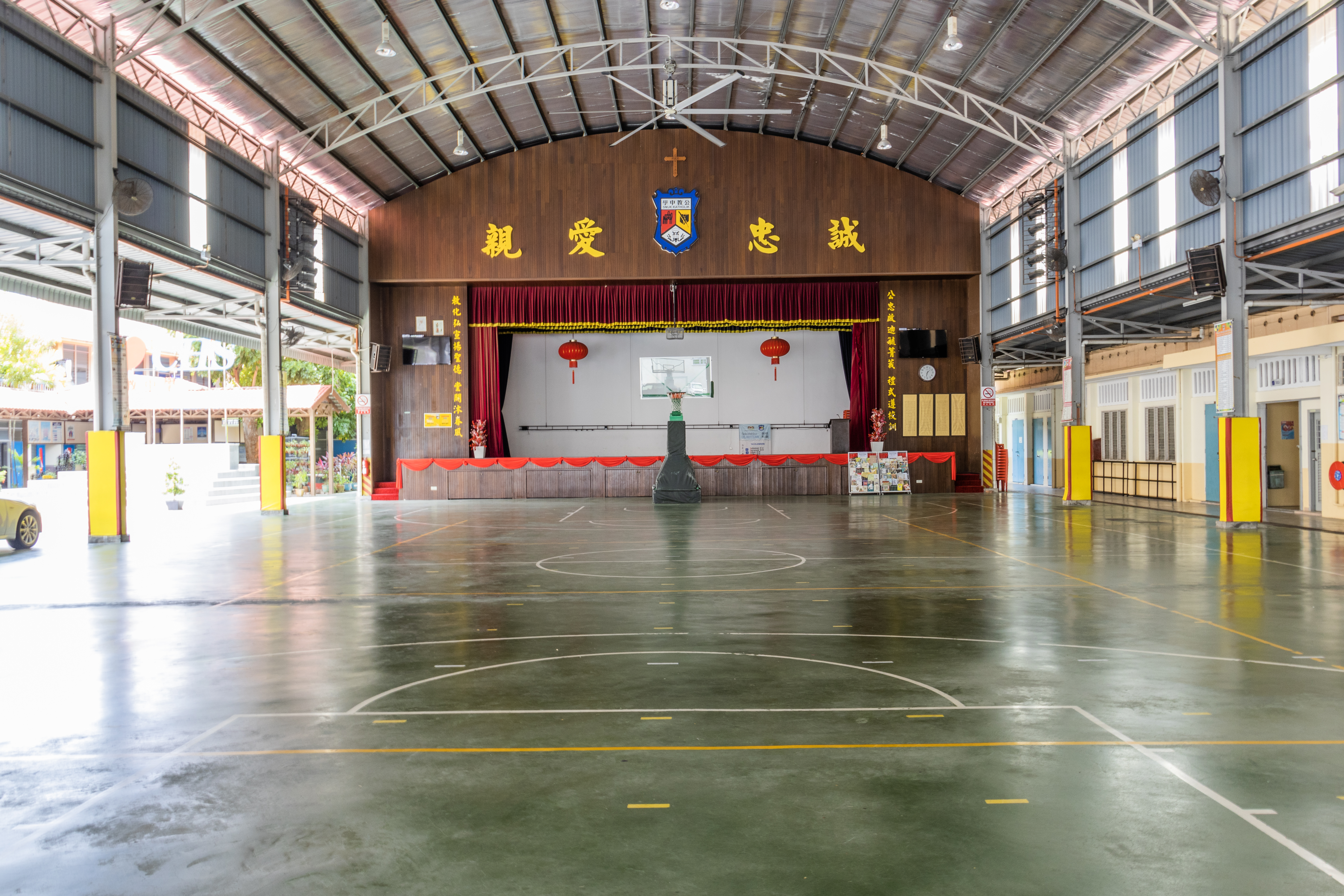
Hall.

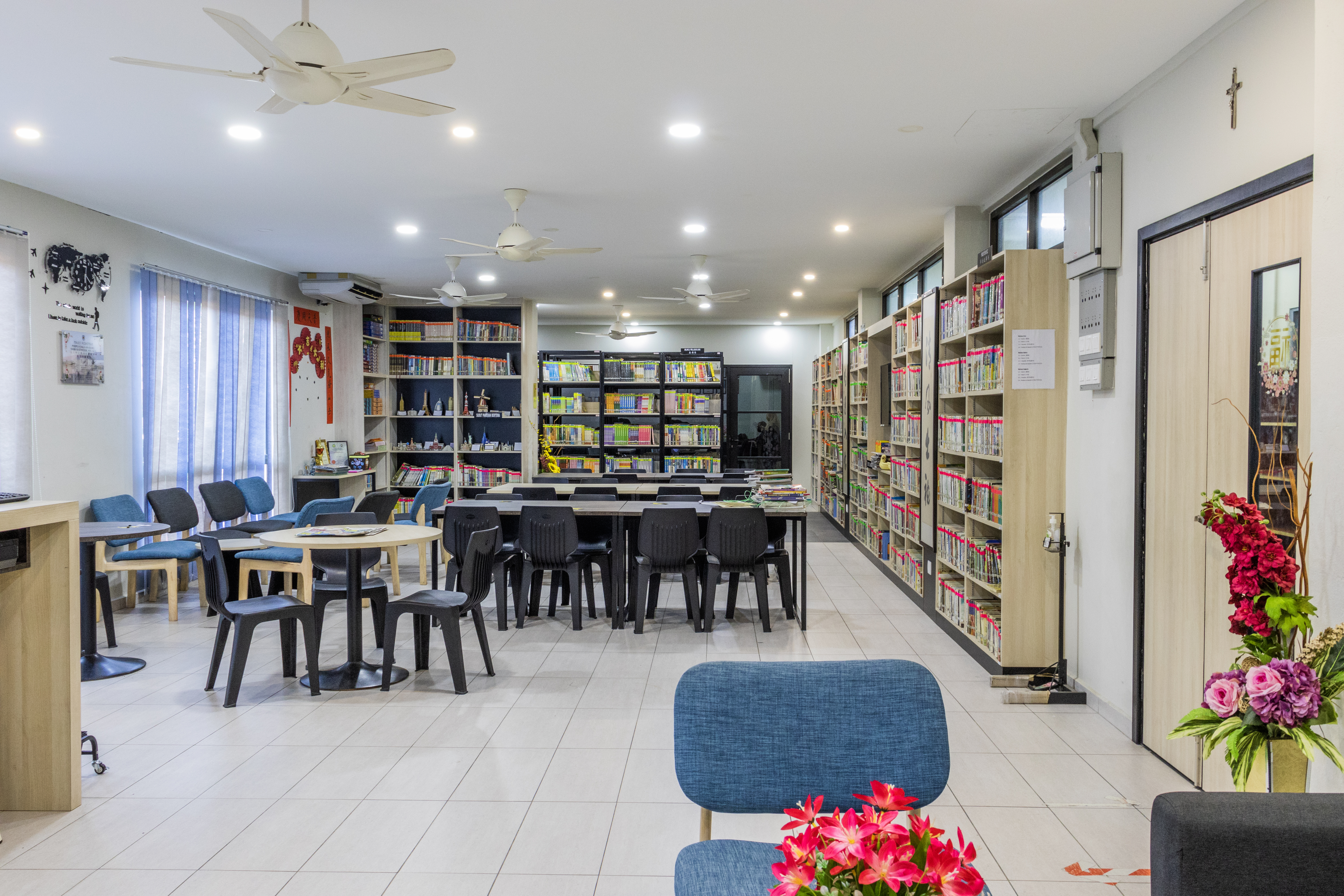
Library.

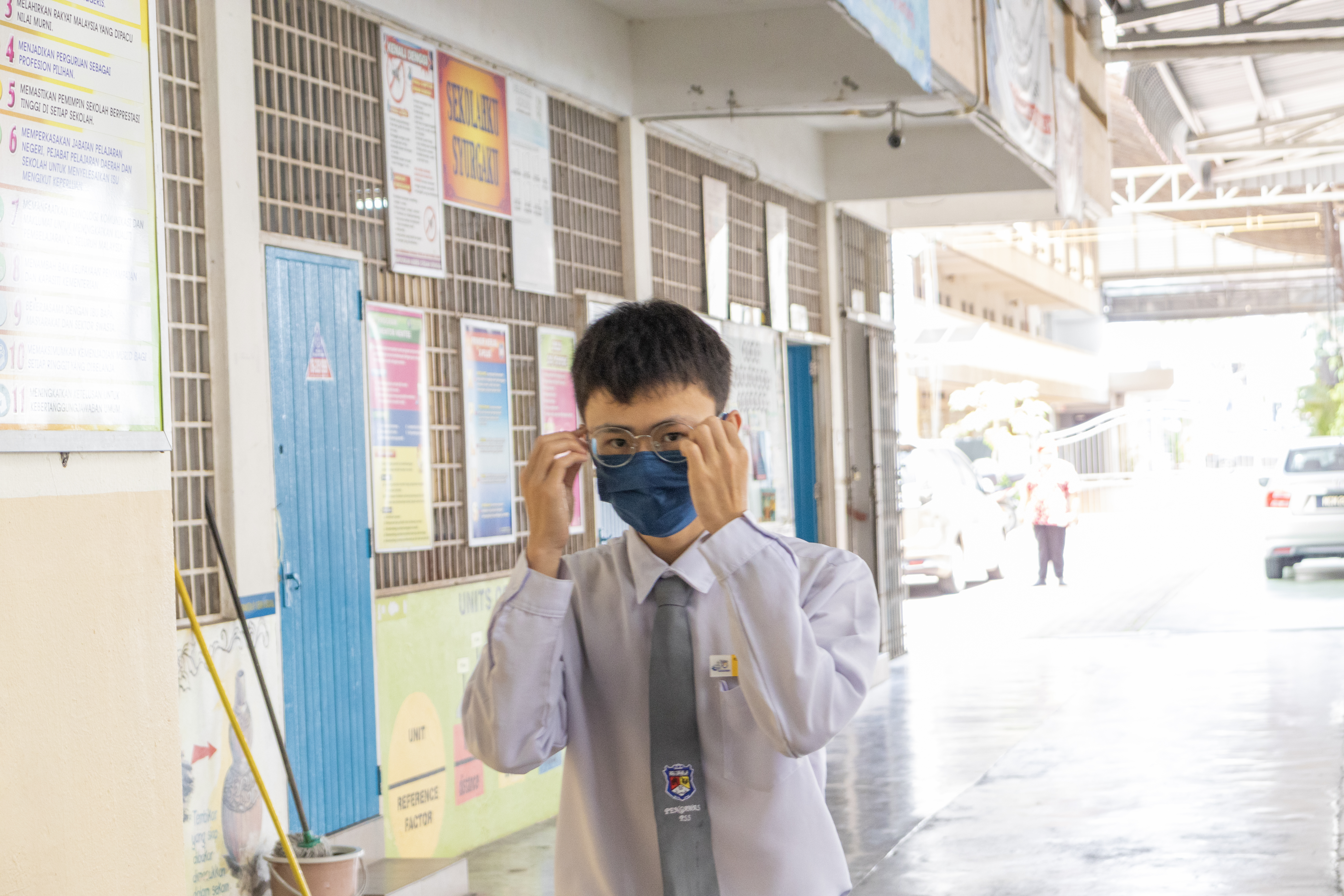
School librarian.

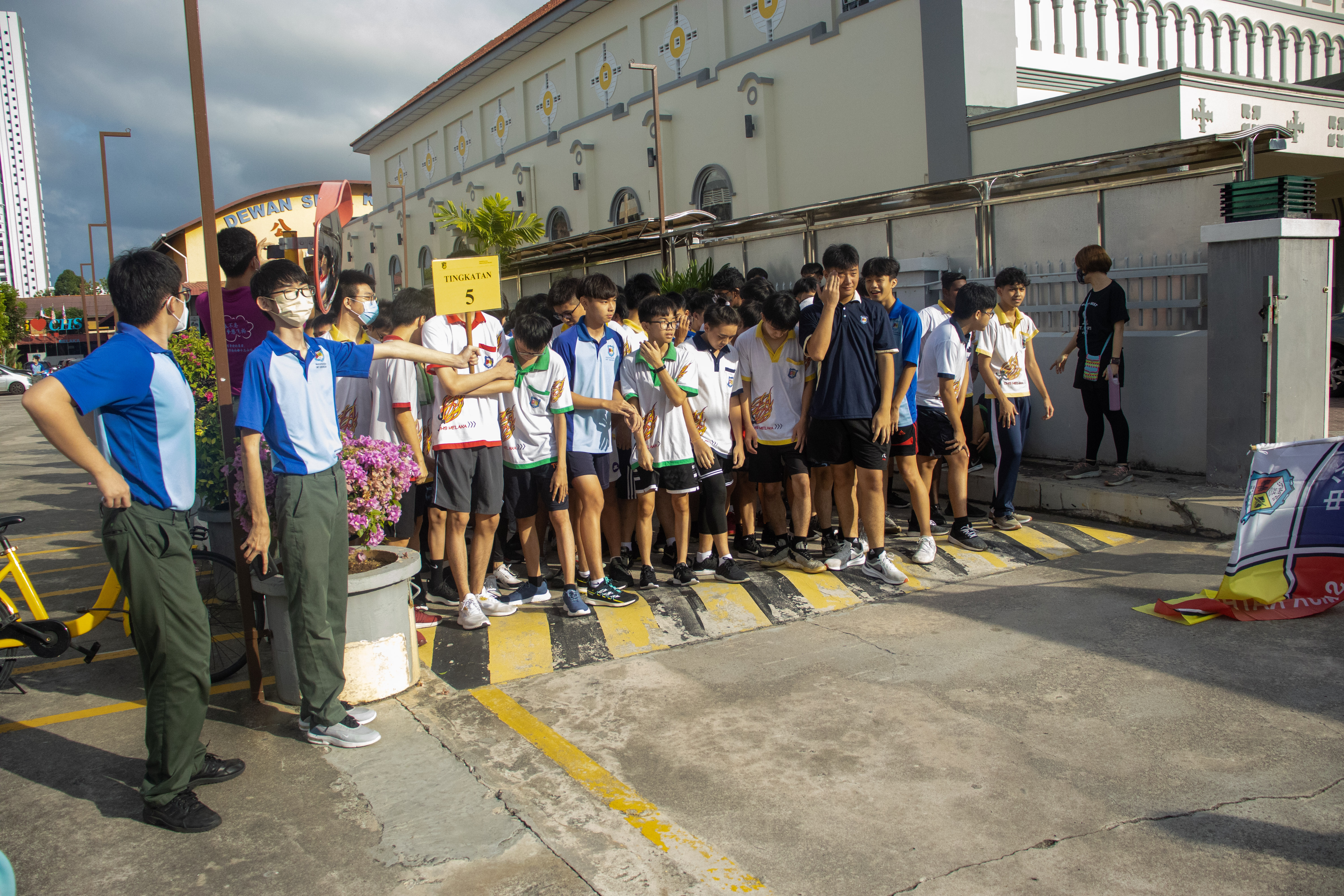
Students.

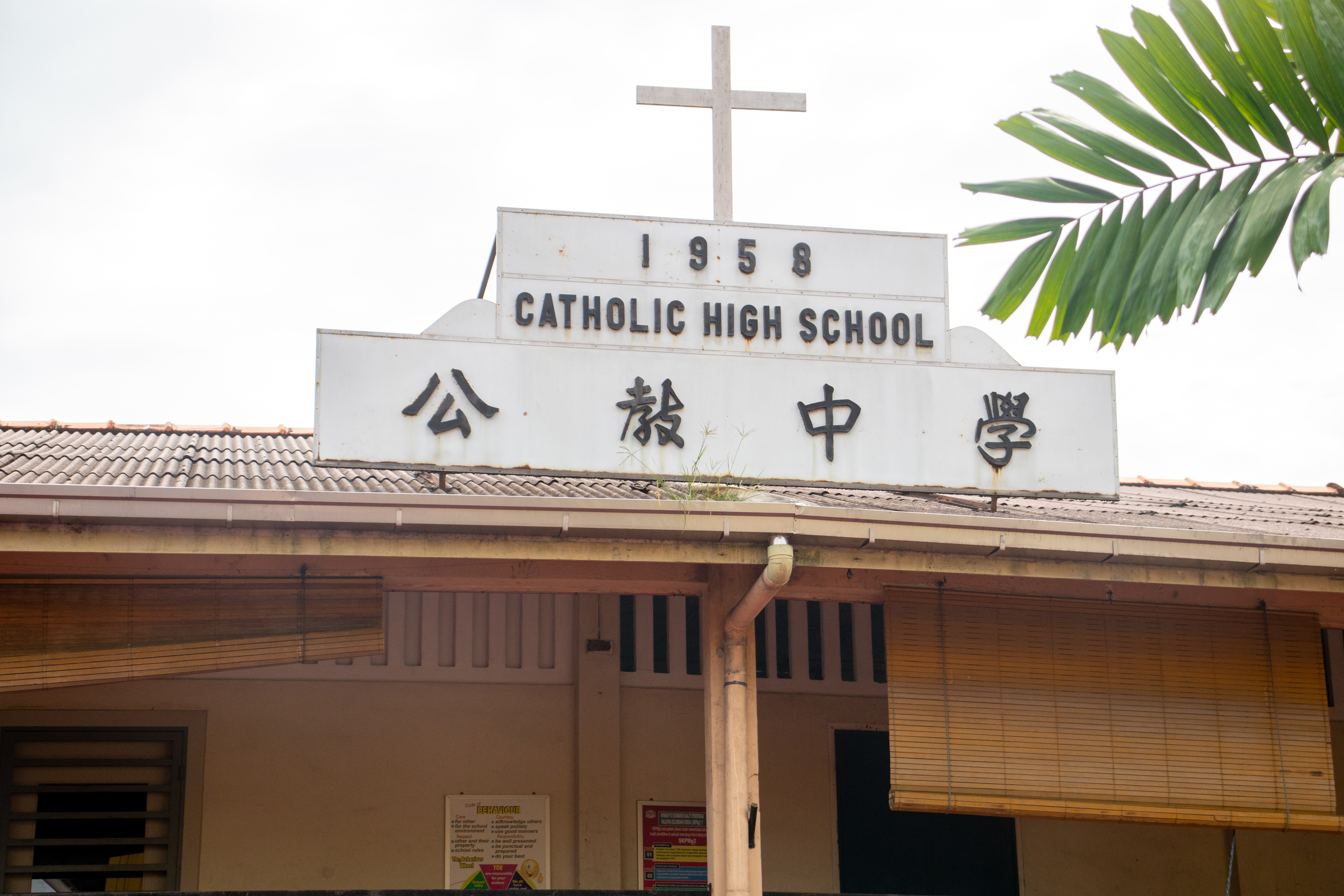
Signboard.

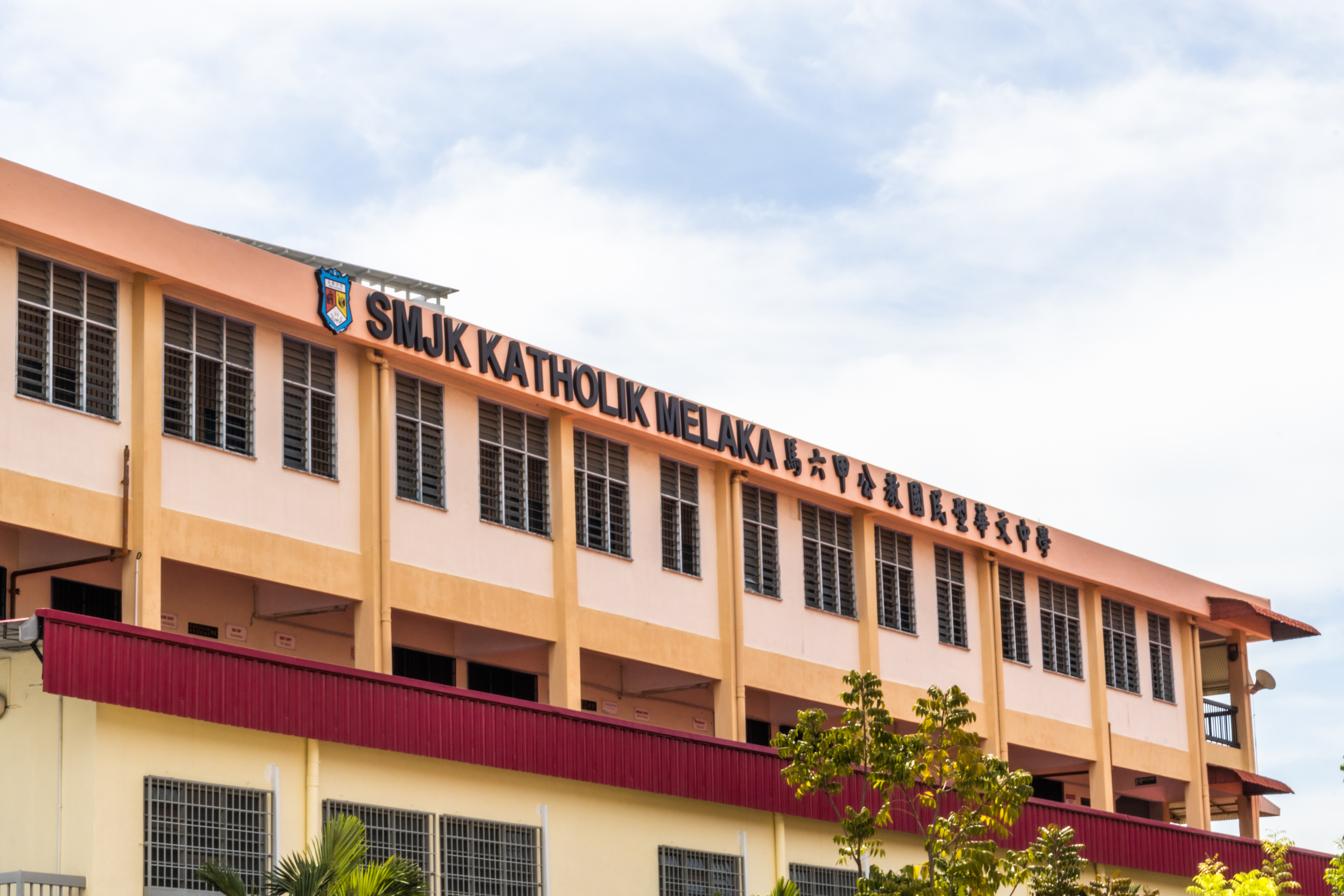
South block.

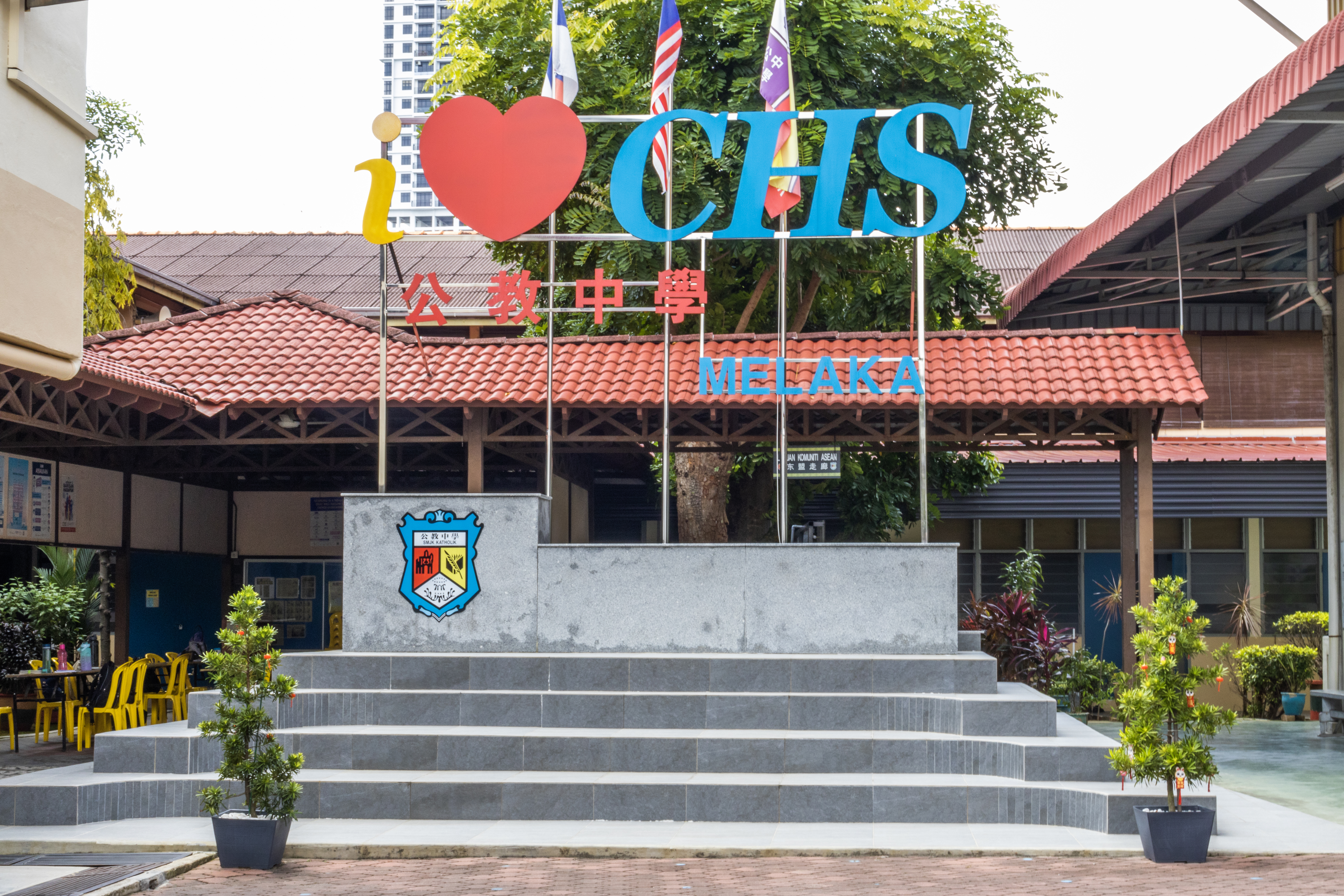
Memorial.
