= Catholic Elementary School, Melaka =

- Sekolah Jenis Kebangsaan (Cina) Katholik

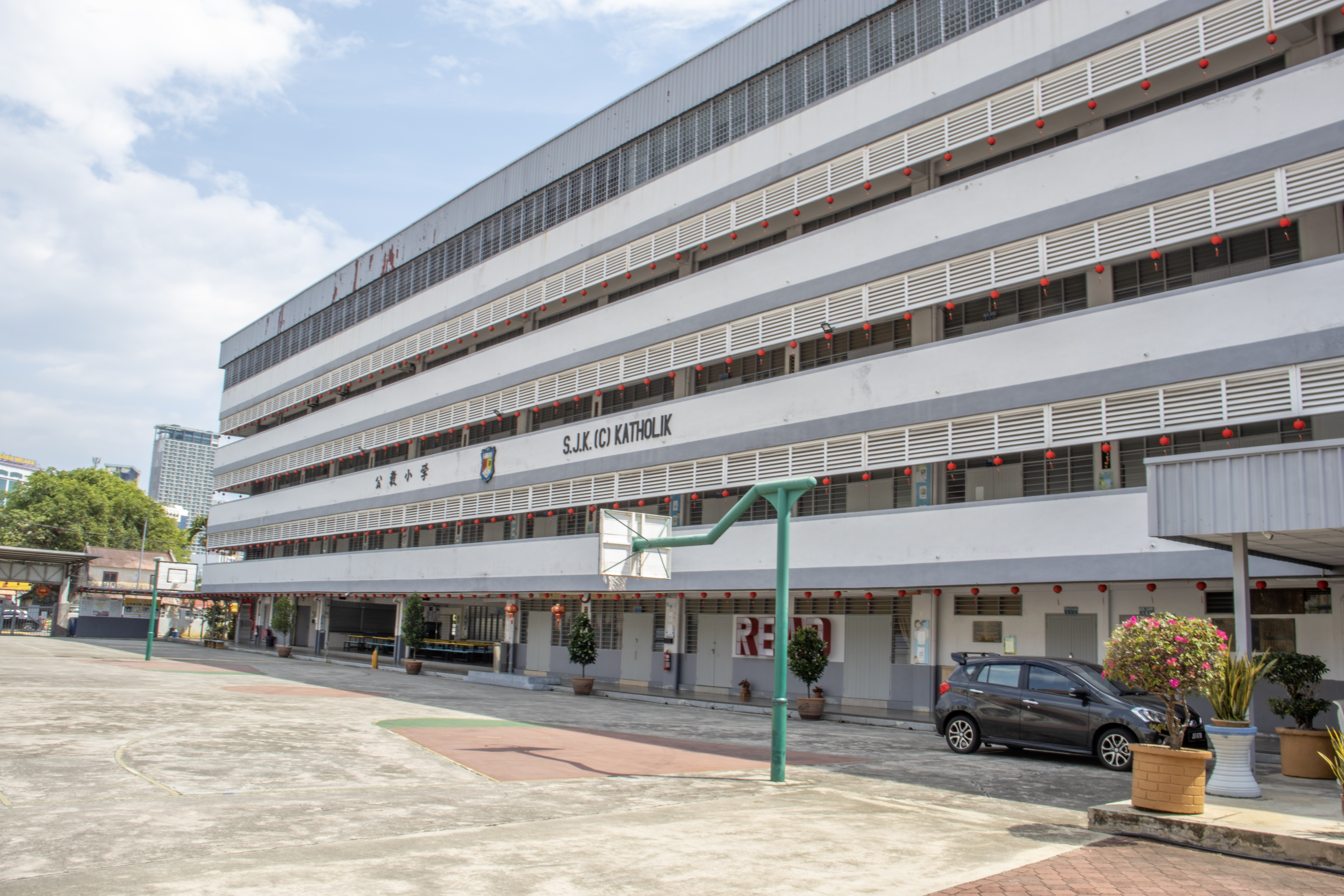
- School building

Location
- 251, Gajah Berang Road; Kampung Tujuh; Malacca City, Malacca, 75200; Malaysia
- Coordinates: 2.206713°N 102.242405°E

Information
- Former name: St. Francis School
- Type: National primary school
- Established: 1928; 98 years ago
- School district: Melaka Tengah
- Educational authority: PPD Melaka Tengah
- School code: MBC2061
- Teaching staff: 14
- Grades: 1–6
- Gender: Male
- Enrollment: 89 (June 2022)
- Last updated: 14 January 2022

Sekolah Jenis Kebangsaan (Cina) Katholik (Chinese: 公教国民型华文小学), is a state primary school located at Gajah Berang Road in Malacca City. The school was initially established at Lorong Pandan (renamed Jalan Datuk Wira Poh Ah Tiam).

== History ==
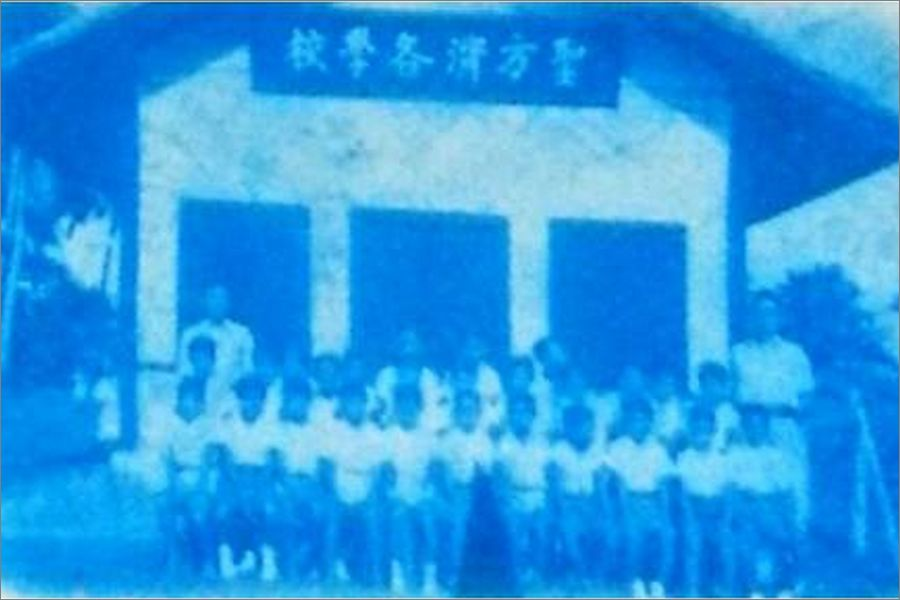
Photograph of students and campus.

In 1937, the school hired 曾伯英 as the headmaster. In 1939, the school celebrated its 10th anniversary. The high school department was established on January 4, 1958, named St. Francis Chinese High School. He pointed out that in 1960, in order to achieve the goal of all boys, the school stopped enrolling girls, and then becomes Catholic School. In April 1961, the elementary school and the high school changed its name to Catholic Elementary School and Catholic High School. In the 1980s, the school had around 1,000 students. In 2023, the school hosts a charity dinner to celebrate its 95th anniversary. In August 2023, the school responded to a toilet-washing scheme suggested by the prime minister.

== Difficulty ==
The school faced the declination in students number.

== Former headmasters ==
- 黄开基
