= Myanmar International School =

School in Yangon, Myanmar

Coordinates: 16.8300°N 96.1571°E

Myanmar International School (MIS)
- Established: 2009
- Principal: N/A
- Academic staff: 50
- Students: 320
- Location: Yangon, Myanmar
- Nickname: MIS Griffins
- Website: http://www.mis-edu.com/

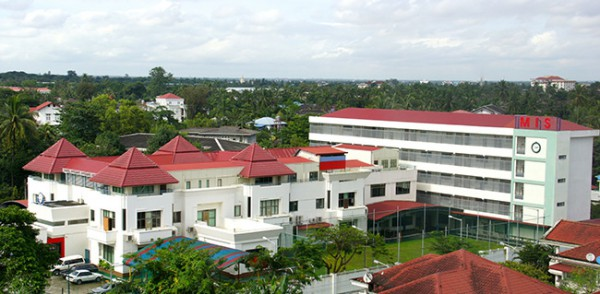
Myanmar International School

Myanmar International School (MIS) is an independent coeducational day school (nursery school to Year 13) in Yangon, Myanmar. It is one of 18 international schools in Yangon and should not be confused with other similarly named international schools in Myanmar, such as MISY. MIS follows the internationally recognized Cambridge International Schools curriculum with a core of academic subjects and a range of enrichment courses and activities, and with an international teaching staff. The school's Chief Education Officer is Richard MacLean.

== History ==
Myanmar International School was founded in 2009 by the Board of Directors of Than Lwin Aye Yar Services Co. Ltd. It is on Pyin Nya Waddy Street adjacent to the Sedona Hotel and close to Inya Lake. The school opened on 1 September 2009.

== Accreditation ==
MIS is an officially recognized Cambridge International school which uses the well-known Cambridge system. Myanmar International School has received accreditation to offer:

- Cambridge Primary with Cambridge Primary Checkpoint
- Cambridge Secondary 1 with Cambridge Checkpoint
- Cambridge IGCSE Cambridge ICE
- Cambridge AS/A Level
- Cambridge AICE

MIS is also a candidate for accreditation by the Western Association of Schools and Colleges (WASC).

== Demographics ==
Staff at MIS come from varied international backgrounds including Australia, England, Columbia, Kenya, Spain, India, Indonesia, Malaysia, New Zealand, the Philippines, Russia, South Africa, Sri Lanka, USA and Zimbabwe. Most classes have an assistant teacher who works closely with the classroom teacher, especially in the area of EAL support.

There are 25 different nationalities represented in the student body of over 1000 students. The majority of students are Myanmar. There is a strong representation of students with Chinese nationality.

== MIS Year levels and programmes of study ==
Primary School

- Nursery & Kindergarten (3–5 years)
  - Learning takes place in a supportive and stimulating environment. Through play, music and the arts children lay foundations for further studies. An emphasis is placed on phonetics as a lead up to reading.
- Years 1–6 (5–11 years)
  - Core subjects of Mathematics, English, Science, Information & Communication Technology and Social Studies Enrichment courses in Art, Music, Physical Education and Myanmar Studies Extracurricular and after school activities including Board games, Modern Dance, Glee Club, Speed Typing, Card Making

Secondary School

- Years 7, 8 and 9
  - Broad and balanced programme of international study developed by Cambridge International Education
  - Core subjects including English, Mathematics, Science, Social Studies, ICT
  - Enrichment courses in Music, Art, Drama, Myanmar Studies and Physical Education
- Year 10 and 11
  - IGCSE examinations in English, Mathematics, Computer Science, Coordinated Science (Biology, Chemistry, Physics), Mandarin, Spanish, Business Studies, Additional Math's and Physical Education
  - Enrichment courses including Drama and Food & Nutrition
  - Extra-curricular activities include sports, clubs and the arts
  - Field trips to expand the classroom learning process by visiting cultural, historical, entertainment or business establishments in the local area or further afield
