= Melaka International School =

International school in Malacca, Malaysia

Melaka International School campus at Taman Siantan

The Melaka International School (MIS) (Note: School uses the Malay language spelling of the state's name, as opposed to the more traditional English language spelling of its name, "Malacca") is an international school in Malacca, Malaysia serving the local and expatriate populations. The school was founded in 1993 and was licensed by the Ministry of Education of Malaysia (MOE). It was the brainchild of the late Dr Mohamed Ishak Syed Ahmed and wife Mrs Shamsunnisa Ishak.

Melaka International School provides British Curriculum Education and is open from Junior Pre School (kindergarten) to A-Levels (pre-university). Students are prepared for the University of Cambridge IGCSE 'O' and 'A' level examinations.

They have international students in primary and secondary levels from 17 countries, namely Korea, India, Japan, Iraq, the United Kingdom, the United States, Australia, Philippines, Singapore, Taiwan, Pakistan, Germany, Sri Lanka, Algeria, Canada and Malaysia. Their academic staff members are drawn from the international arena as well. They are recruited from all over the world.
