= Comb generator =

Signal generator that produces multiple harmonic outputs

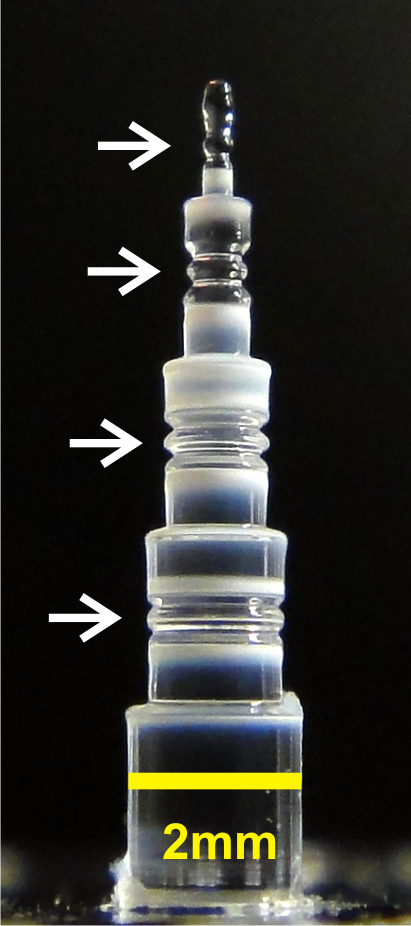
Fused quartz laser cavities for comb frequency generation

A comb generator is a signal generator that produces multiple harmonics of its input signal. The appearance of the output at the spectrum analyzer screen, resembling teeth of a comb, gave the device its name.

Comb generators find wide range of uses in microwave technology – e.g., synchronous signals in wide frequency bandwidth can be produced by a comb generator. The most common use is in broadband frequency synthesizers, where the high frequency signals act as stable references correlated to the lower energy references; the outputs can be used directly, or to synchronize phase-locked loop oscillators. It may be also used to generate a complete set of substitution channels for testing, each of which carries the same baseband audio and video signal.

Comb generators are also used in radio frequency interference testing of consumer electronics, where their output is used as a simulated radio frequency emissions, as it is a stable broadband noise source with repeatable output. It is also used during compliance testing to various government requirements for products such as medical devices, military electronics (MIL-STD-461), commercial avionics), and digital electronics.

An optical comb generator can be used as generators of terahertz radiation. Internally, it is a resonant electro-optic modulator, with the capability of generating hundreds of sidebands with total span of at least 3 terahertz (limited by the optical dispersion of the lithium niobate crystal) and frequency spacing of 17 GHz. Other construction can be based on erbium-doped fiber laser or Ti-sapphire laser often in combination with carrier envelope offset control.

== See also ==
- Comb filter
- Frequency comb
