= Infant Jesus Convent, Malacca =

Sekolah Menengah Kebangsaan Infant Jesus Convent
- Convent of the Holy Infant Jesus 圣婴女子中学

Location
- 144, Parameswara Road; Bandar Hilir; Malacca City, Malacca, 75000; Malaysia
- Coordinates: 2.18957°N 102.257°E

Information
- Type: Sekolah Menengah Kebangsaan (National Secondary School)
- Motto: Simple Dans Ma Virtu, Forte Dans Mon Devoir (Simple In Virtue, Steadfast In Duty)
- Established: 1875
- Founder: Reverend Mother Mathilde Raclot
- School district: Melaka Tengah
- School code: MEB2097
- Teaching staff: 61
- Forms: 1-6
- Enrollment: 834 (2022)
- Colours: Blue, White, Yellow
- Yearbook: The Lantern
- Last updated: 30 November 2022

Sekolah Menengah Kebangsaan Infant Jesus Convent, commonly referred to as Infant Jesus Convent (IJC) is a secondary school for girls in the city of Malacca, Malaysia.

== Notable alumni ==
- Shirley Geok-lin Lim, author
