= Israeli Juggling Convention =

Annual juggling convention located in Israel

The Israeli Juggling Convention (IJC) takes place each year during the Passover Holiday. The IJC is the second biggest juggling convention in the world (after the EJC) with around 2000 participants each year.

== Summary ==
Israeli juggling conventions started in the late 80s and then took a break before continuing regularly from the mid-90s. Since 2000, the IJC has been on the same site and has used a consistent format:

- The convention takes place during the intermediary days of Passover.
- Since 2000, the convention has been located in the Gan HaShlosha National Park in the north of Israel near Beit She'an.
- It is a camping convention and the main activities take place in a large on-site gym. There are vendors, workshops, and general practice space available for juggling and many other circus skills.
- The first evening traditionally has a juggling competition named in memory of Avi Rosenberg. For many years it alternated between 3 ball and 3 club opens, but since 2014 it has been a best trick competition with any prop. Winners are voted for by the audience and cash prizes are sponsored by the Rosenberg family.
- The Special Show is a full theater show that varies between artistic, theatrical, technical, and comedy.
- Smaller shows include an open stage, a fire show, renegades, juggle jam, kids shows, a closing show, and sometimes others.
- Starting in 2015, IJC has had a successful parade through the city of Beit Shean.
- The Juggling Olympics is usually one of the last days or nights of the convention. Numerous juggling games and contests are presented. Highlights have included 5 ball endurance, shekel juggling, the "Tournir Yoni" 3 tennis ball combat, club combat, and unicycle combat. In 2015 and 2016 it was held in the Roman amphitheater of the Beit She'an National Park.
- Other competitions held at IJC have included Fight Night, IJA IRC and volley club.
- Many years had an Israeli Show showcasing many of the best Israeli performers.
- The International Gala is on the final evening and is a high quality variety show with about a dozen world-class performers brought in from around the world.
- IJC hosts special and disadvantaged groups to visit the convention and take part in workshops and activities every year.
- Workshops: In 2019 there were over 220 workshops at levels for beginner, intermediate and advanced. There are 10 designated locations, including a covered filed in pool area (3), a shaded amphitheater (2) and the gym (4 + 1 Passing Zone)

== Past conventions ==
Number	Year	Main Organizer	Guest Artists	Attendance	Location
29	2024	Dekel Azulay	Marc Zeun & Simon Moreau (Roar Circus), Amélie Degrande, Hisashi Watanbe, Yushi Yahata, Mario de Jesus Barragan Martinez, Krzysztof Kostera, Rebecca Smith	~2,000 * (Limited attendance)	Gan HaShlosha National Park (Sachne)
28	2023	Dekel Azulay	Batist Van Baekel, Samantha (Natasha) Patterson, Enrique Rosenman Cordeu, Ivano (Yi Huang), Baptiste Jeannequin, Emmanuel Ritoux, Manuel Mitasch & Moritz Rosner, Duo Full House (Gabriela Camus Schmutz & Henry Camus), Yahel Retter & Kira Rabenstein, Helena Berry, Alonso Matias Gonzalez, Non Sin Tri (Aleix Lidon Baulida & Sara Gilsanz Grandas & Alvaro Caballer Revenga)	~2,400 * (Limited attendance)	Gan HaShlosha National Park (Sachne)
27	2022	Dekel Azulay	Felix Feldmann, David Ezra Eisele, Carla Carnerero, Domenyk La Terra, Eyal Bor, Ron Beeri & Itamar Glucksmann	~2,000 * (Limited attendance)	Gan HaShlosha National Park (Sachne)
--	2021	IJC Team		???	Zoom
--	2020	IJC Team	7pm Opening Show, 8pm JugTed (Ted Talks), 9pm Olympics, 10pm Quiz Game, 10:30pm Big Toss Up	~110	Zoom
26	2019	Dekel Azulay	Guillermo Leon De Keijzer, LPM (Lucas Castelo Branco, Hannes Bauhofen, Andrés Torrez), Lucas Zileri, Kellin Quinn, Raul Cañas, Ezra Weill, Mounâ Chan, Pen Zen	~2,000 * (Limited attendance)	Gan HaShlosha National Park (Sachne)
25	2018	Dekel Azulay	Delaney Bayles, Ron Beeri & Itamar Glucksmann, Francesco Caspani, Edward Cliffe, Cirque Democratique (Gab Dondewel & Sander De Cuyper & Bram Dobbleberre), Joe Fisher, Juliette Hulot & Emmanuelle Legros, Nelli Kujansivu, Sebastian Landauer, Ariane Oechsner & Partner	~2,000 * (Limited attendance)	Gan HaShlosha National Park (Sachne)
24	2017	Dekel Azulay and Ron Atazky	Juan Duartemateos, Chihhan Chao, Lu Yu Cheng (Lucas), Yang Chin Yao, Chan Yi Kan, Onni Toivonen, Thom Wall, Doreen Grossman, Olena Biambasuren, Sveta Kolodiy, Christine Oymann	~2,000 * (Limited attendance)	Gan HaShlosha National Park (Sachne)
23	2016	Ron Atazky and Dekel Azulay	Joseph Viatte, Alexis Levillon, Yosuke Ikeda, Lucas Castelo Branco, EAEO (Eric Longequel, Sander De Cuyper, Bram Dobbleberre, Jordan De Cuyper, Neta Oren), Jonglissimo (Manuel Mitasch, Dominik Harant, Daniel Ledel)	~2,000 * (Limited attendance)	Gan HaShlosha National Park (Sachne)
22	2015	Ron Atazky	Dan Holzman (USA), Alexandra Soboleva, Patrik Elmnert (Sweden), Wes Peden (USA), Bogdan Illouz, Gon Fernandez, Emil Dahl (Sweden), Solvejg Weyeneth, Matthew Poki McCorkle (USA).	~1,500 * (Limited attendance)	Gan HaShlosha National Park (Sachne)
21	2014	Ron Atazky	Michael Davies, Kyle Johnson, Miguel Gigosos Ronda, Samuel Youde, Guillaume Martinet & Eric Longequel, Roxana Küwen, Guillaume Karpowicz and Daniel Sánchez Rodríguez.	~1,300 * (Limited attendance)	Gan HaShlosha National Park (Sachne)
20	2013	Ron Atazky	Lorenzo Mastropietro, Mikel Ayala, Mael Tabibi, Jordi Querol, Steven Ragatz, Gustaf Rosell, Anni Kuper, Laura Von Bongard, Mario Danee, Arata Urawa, Antoine Terrieux, Julien Mandier.	~1,900	Gan HaShlosha National Park (Sachne)
19	2012	Ron Atazky	Paul Ponce, Eric Bates, Tony Pezzo, Luis Sartori, Etienne Chauzy, Marianna De Sanctis, Riccardo Tanca, and Petter Wadsten.	~1,700	Gan HaShlosha National Park (Sachne)
18	2011	Ron Atazky	Ines Brun, Stefan Sing & Cristiana Casadio, Matt Hall, Shake That (Hans Vanwynsberghe, Joris Verbeeren, Sander De Cuyper, Nino Mertens, Gab Bondewel), Cie Ea Eo (Eric Longequel, Sander De Cuyper, Jordaan De Cuyper, Bram Dobbelaere), Florent Lestage	~1,300	Gan HaShlosha National Park (Sachne)
17	2010	Ron Atazky	Pol & Freddy, Joelle Huguenin, Jacob and Nate Sharpe, Jorden Moir, Jeanine Ebnöther, Mathieu Moustache, Pavel Evsukevich, Isabella Du Bois, Cyrille Humen and Daniel Shultz	~1,200	Gan HaShlosha National Park (Sachne)
16	2009	Ron Atazky	Matthias Romir, Lena Köhn, Mike Rollins, Ronan McLoughlin, Luis "Toto" Villesca, Le BoTrio, DeFracto (Guillaume Martinet and Minhtam Kaplan), Carlos Muñoz, Alexander Kulakov.	~1,200	Gan HaShlosha National Park (Sachne)
15	2008	Ron Atazky	Wes Peden, Lorenzo Mastropietro, Frida Odden, Sean Blue, Look Sharp (Peter Aberg and Viktor Gyllenberg), Fred Normal, Nicolas Longuechaud, Audrey Decaillon and Fraser Hooper	~1,100	Gan HaShlosha National Park (Sachne)
14	2007	Ron Atazky	Erik Aberg (Sweden), Morgan (France), Marco Paoletti (South America), Jan Oving (Holland), Luke Burrage and Pola Braendle (England/Germany), Tempei Arakawa (Japan)	~1,000	Gan HaShlosha National Park (Sachne)
13	2006	Ron Atazky	Maksim Komaro and Markus Lahtinen, Matt Hall (USA), Tr’espace, the German/Swiss Diabolo Duo, La Petit Travers (France), Get The Shoe	~1,000	Gan HaShlosha National Park (Sachne)
12	2005	Ron Atazky and Kulu Itsik Orr	Pas En Rond (France), Jean Furry (France), Markus Furtner (Germany), Stefan Sing and Philip Mayhofer (Germany), Thomas Dietz and Mark "Schani" Probst" (Germany/Austria), Bob Cates (Canada)	~900	Gan HaShlosha National Park (Sachne)
11	2004	Kulu Itsik Orr and Ron Atazky	Thomas Dietz (Germany), Peter Gerber (Germany), Mark "Schani" Probst (Austria), Tony Duncan (USA), Vincent Berhault and Compagnie Du Singulier (France)	864	Gan HaShlosha National Park (Sachne)
10	2003	Kulu Itsik Orr	Vova and Olga Galchenko (Russia), Denis Paumier and Les Objets Volants (France)	775	Gan HaShlosha National Park (Sachne)
9	2002	Kulu Itsik Orr	Tom Murphy (after a last minute cancellation by the Gandini Project)	400	Gan HaShlosha National Park (Sachne)
8	2001	Kulu Itsik Orr	Luke Wilson (England) and Ilka Licht (Germany), Tomas Dahlen (Sweden)	300	Gan HaShlosha National Park (Sachne)
7	2000	Kulu Itsik Orr	Pepretuum Mobile (Israel), Isaac Orr and Amir Levi (Israel), Ofer Blum (Israel), Mikhail Staroseletsky (Israel).	200	Gan HaShlosha National Park (Sachne)
6	1999	Guy Lev	Rod Laver (England), Bim Mason (England)	140	Yafit, Jordan Valley
5	1998	Guy Lev	Flying Bob (Canada)	120	Kibbutz Tuval
4	1997	Scott Seltzer	Francois Volet and Rena Penna (Australia)	100	Hebrew University, Givat Ram, Jerusalem
--	1996	Raphael Harris	Yosef (Jonathon) Rosenberg	100	Hineni Center, Downtown Jerusalem
3	1990	Omri Bar-Lev	Lee Hays	~70	Eilat
2	1989	Roni and Rusty		~70	Eilat
1	1988	Roni and Rusty			Eilat

== Run by volunteers ==
- IJC is backed by a certified non-profit organization, The Non-Profit for the Advancement of Juggling and Circus in Israel. The convention is run mainly by volunteers (except for some small roles such as security and registration).

== See also ==
- British Juggling Convention
- European Juggling Convention
