= Beit Alfa =

Kibbutz in northern Israel

Beit Alfa: בֵּית אַלְפָא (Hebrew)
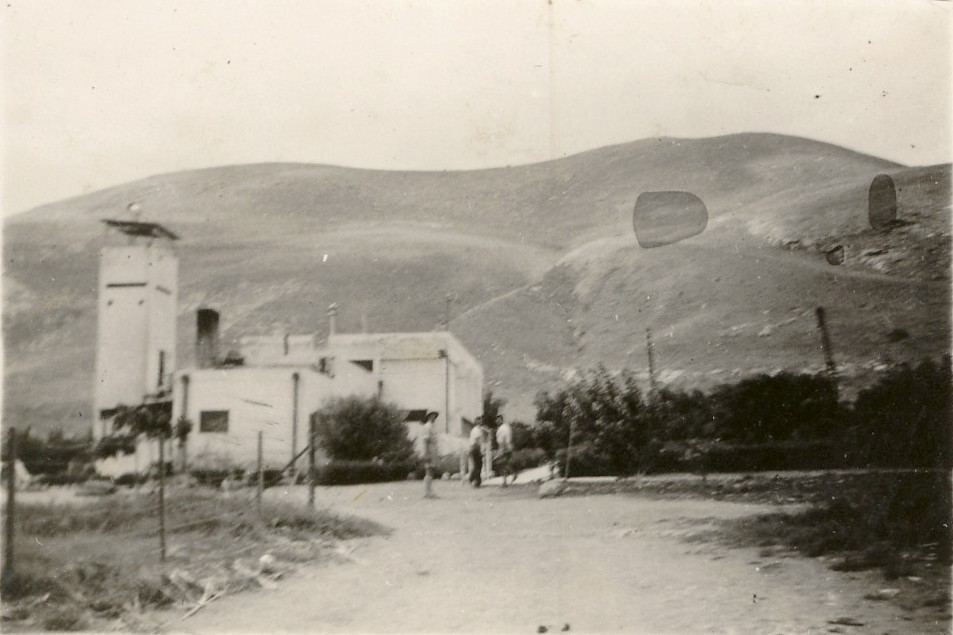
- Beit Alfa, 1930s

- Location within Jezreel Valley region of Israel Location within Israel
- Coordinates: 32°30′58″N 35°25′49″E
- Country: Israel
- District: Northern
- Subdistrict: Jezreel
- Council: Gilboa
- Affiliation: Kibbutz Movement
- Founded: 4 November 1922
- Founder: Hashomer Hatzair
- Population (2024): 1,216
- Website: www.betalfa.org.il

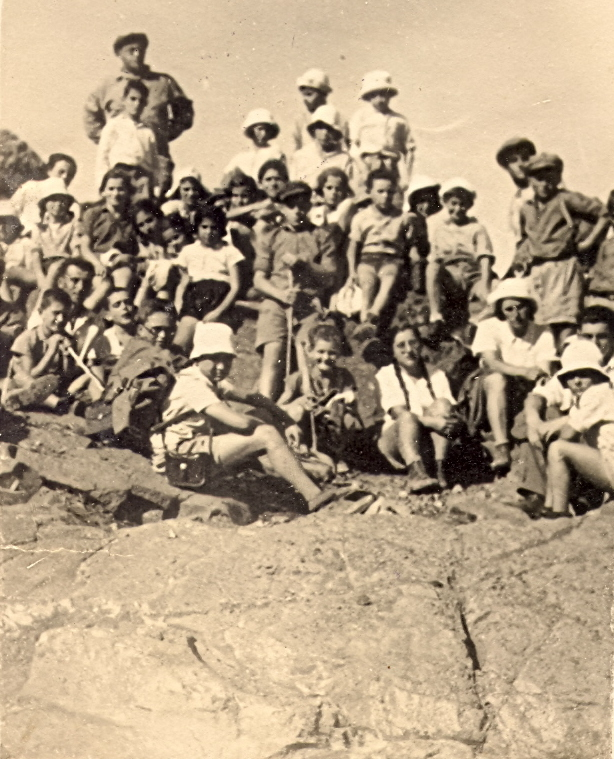
Children from Kibbutz Beit Alfa on Mount Gilboa, circa 1935

Beit Alfa (Hebrew: בֵּית אַלְפָא, romanized: bẹt alfa; also Beit Alpha, Bet Alpha and Bet Alfa) is a kibbutz in the Northern District of Israel, founded in 1922 by Jewish immigrants from Poland. Located at the base of the Gilboa ridge, it falls under the jurisdiction of Gilboa Regional Council. As of 2024 its population was 1,216.

== Geography ==
The kibbutz lies at the bottom of the northern steep slopes of Mount Gilboa, on the eastern edge of the Harod Valley, between the Jezreel Valley and the Beit She'an Valley in the Lower Galilee. The Gilboa mountain range stretches to its west, with the closest peaks Har ('Mount') Barkan (497 m) and Har Gefet (318 m). The area north and east of the kibbutz is flat, but falls to the east towards the Jordan Rift Valley. To the north of the kibbutz flows the Harod Stream, whose waters are used to fill numerous ponds. Adjacent to the kibbutz to the west are Kibbutz Heftziba and Beit Alfa Synagogue National Park; Gan HaShlosha National Park is directly to its east; and kibbutz Ma'ale Gilboa sits on top of Mount Gilboa directly to the south. Other notable locations in the vicinity are kibbutzim Reshafim, Sde Nahum, and Nir David, the depopulated Arab village of Khirbet Bait Ilfa, Shita prison, and in the West Bank to the south is the Palestinian village Faqqua.

== History ==
A 6th-century Jewish settlement-in which the Beit Alfa Synagogue served as its house of worship–survived into Islamic times as Beit Ilfa.

On 4 November 1922, Hashomer Hatzair settlers from Poland established the modern kibbutz, Beit Alpha, naming it after the nearby abandoned Arab village, Khirbet Beit Ilfa.

The founding members gained their first experience in 1921, when they participated in the establishment of kibbutz Geva. At first, the settlers suffered from very severe operating conditions in the swamps and malaria was widespread. In April 1927 the kibbutz was visited by the Czechoslovak president Tomáš Masaryk. In 1928 the members of the adjacent Kibbutz Heftziba discovered on their grounds the remains of the Beth Alpha synagogue, dating back to the Byzantine period. During the Arab riots of 1929, the kibbutz was attacked and its fields destroyed. When the Arab uprising broke out in April 1936, the Arabs again set fire to the surrounding fields.

In 1940, some of the members affiliated with Hashomer Hatzair moved to Kibbutz Ramat Yohanan, swapping places with supporters of Mapai from that kibbutz. According to the Jewish National Fund, this move was prompted by an ideological split. In subsequent years the kibbutz was one of the centers used by the Jewish paramilitary organization Haganah.

On 1 April 1948, the kibbutz was attacked by Arab mortar fire. The Arabs withdrew as a platoon from the 1st parachute battalion of the British 6th Airborne Division approached.

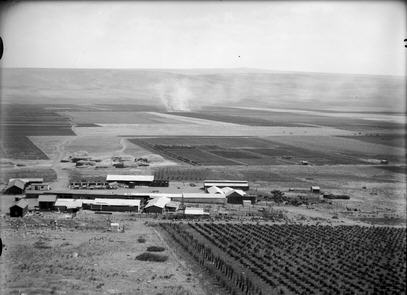
Beit Alfa 1925

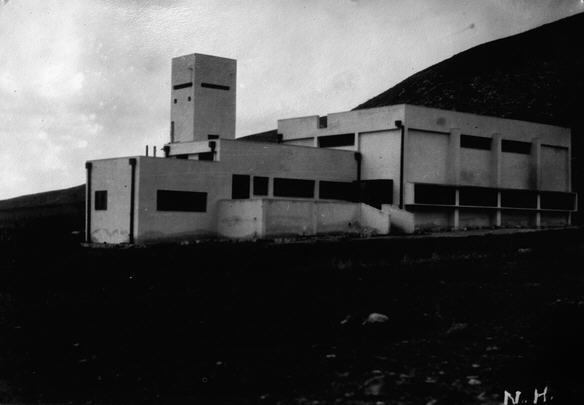
Beit Alfa 1935

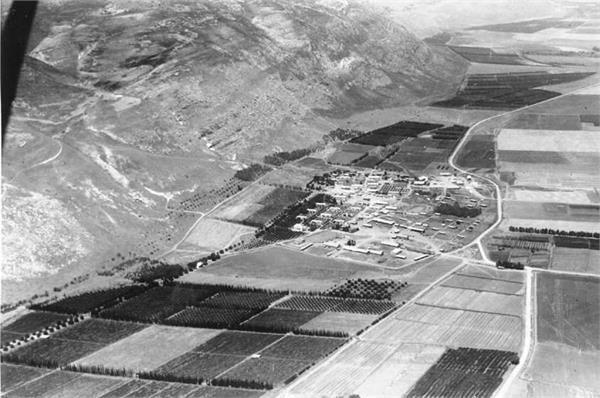
Beit Alfa 1938

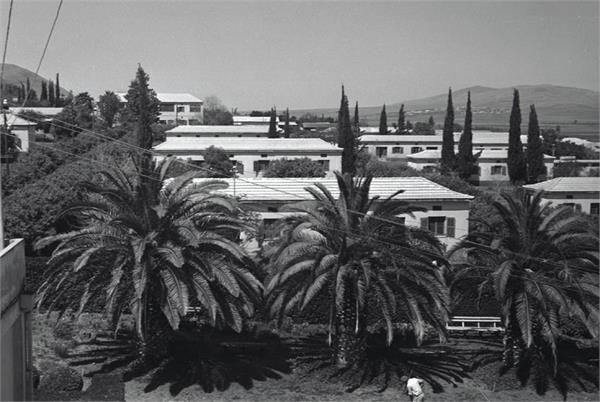
Beit Alfa 1945

After the 1948 Arab–Israeli War, the Gilboa Educational Institute was established in the northern part of the kibbutz. The institute, which served as a school for the surrounding area, offered boarding and had an array of sports facilities and workshops enabling professional training. At the end of 2003 the institute was closed and the complex of buildings has since been used for various educational courses. During the 2006 Lebanon War, the kibbutz took in evacuees from the border villages that had been under rocket attack by Hezbollah militants from southern Lebanon. After the war an absorption center for Ethiopian immigrants was set up here. Some 600 people are offered boarding, Hebrew language courses, and are prepared for integration in the Israeli society.

Meir Har-Zion built a farm and house, "Ahuzat Shoshana", on a hilltop just north and in sight of Beit Alfa, right next to the ruins of the Crusader castle of Belvoir. The farm is named after his sister and her name is written on the gate to the farm.

== Economy ==
Dairy: The kibbutz dairy was the first in Israel to use robotic milking technology.

Poultry: Beit Alfa operates three poultry houses in which the eggs are collected centrally on an egg conveyor belt.

Furniture: Beit Alfa Home Furniture builds custom furniture for homes and offices. It is a recognized supplier for Israel's Ministry of Defense.

Special Purpose Vehicles: BAT (Beit Alfa Technologies) began making fire trucks in 1966. Today it manufactures vehicles for rapid airport intervention that eject foam, water, and dry powder. BAT manufacturers Water Restraint Systems for non-lethal crowd control of dangerous inmates and correctional facilities. BAT also expanded to become an international designer and manufacturer of special purpose vehicles for the military, law enforcement, and government and private sectors. BAT has sold riot control vehicles to more than 30 countries. According to The Guardian, BAT "developed a profitable industry selling anti-riot vehicles" to the apartheid regime in South Africa "for use against protesters in the black townships". BAT's vehicles have also been used as riot control vehicles in Burundi to suppress protests against the unconstitutional extension of President Nkurunziza's presidency.

Guest Houses: The kibbutz runs a guesthouse with 37 units, five of them with wheelchair access.

=== Beit Alpha Cucumber ===
Since the 1930s a kibbutz member, Hanka Lazarson, was engaged in vegetable breeding; including: cucumber, onion, garlic, aubergine and cauliflower. Between 1931 and 1936 she developed a breed of cucumbers that came to be known as the "Beit Alpha Cucumber" (or "Beth Alpha Cucumber"). The breed became highly popular worldwide due to its excellent taste and high yield. The vegetable breeding program in Beit Alpha continued successfully over the next 30 years; constantly improving various varieties.

== Archaeology ==
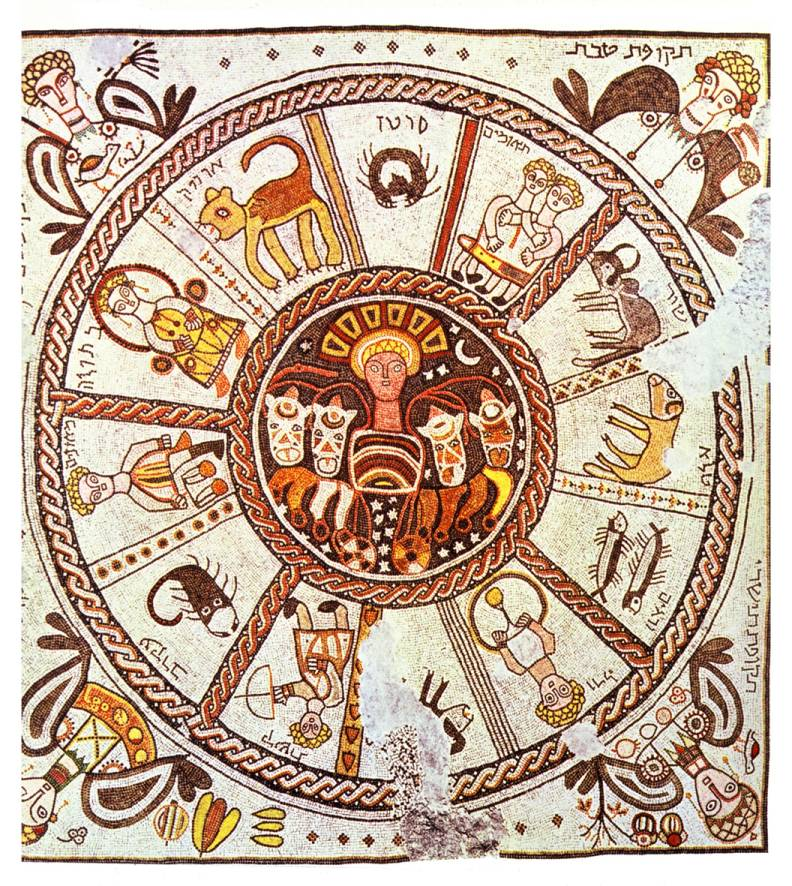
Zodiac mosaic, Beit Alfa synagogue

When irrigation canals were being dug in 1928, an ancient mosaic was unearthed on Jewish National Fund land on the grounds of Kibbutz Hefzibah. The government of Palestine's Department of Antiquities granted permission for excavation to the Hebrew University of Jerusalem. The excavations, led by Eleazar Sukenik, revealed a synagogue and a mosaic floor from the fifth century.

The Beit Alfa Synagogue National Park established at the site contains an ancient Byzantine-era synagogue, with a mosaic floor depicting the lunar Hebrew months as they correspond to the signs of the zodiac.

== Notable people ==
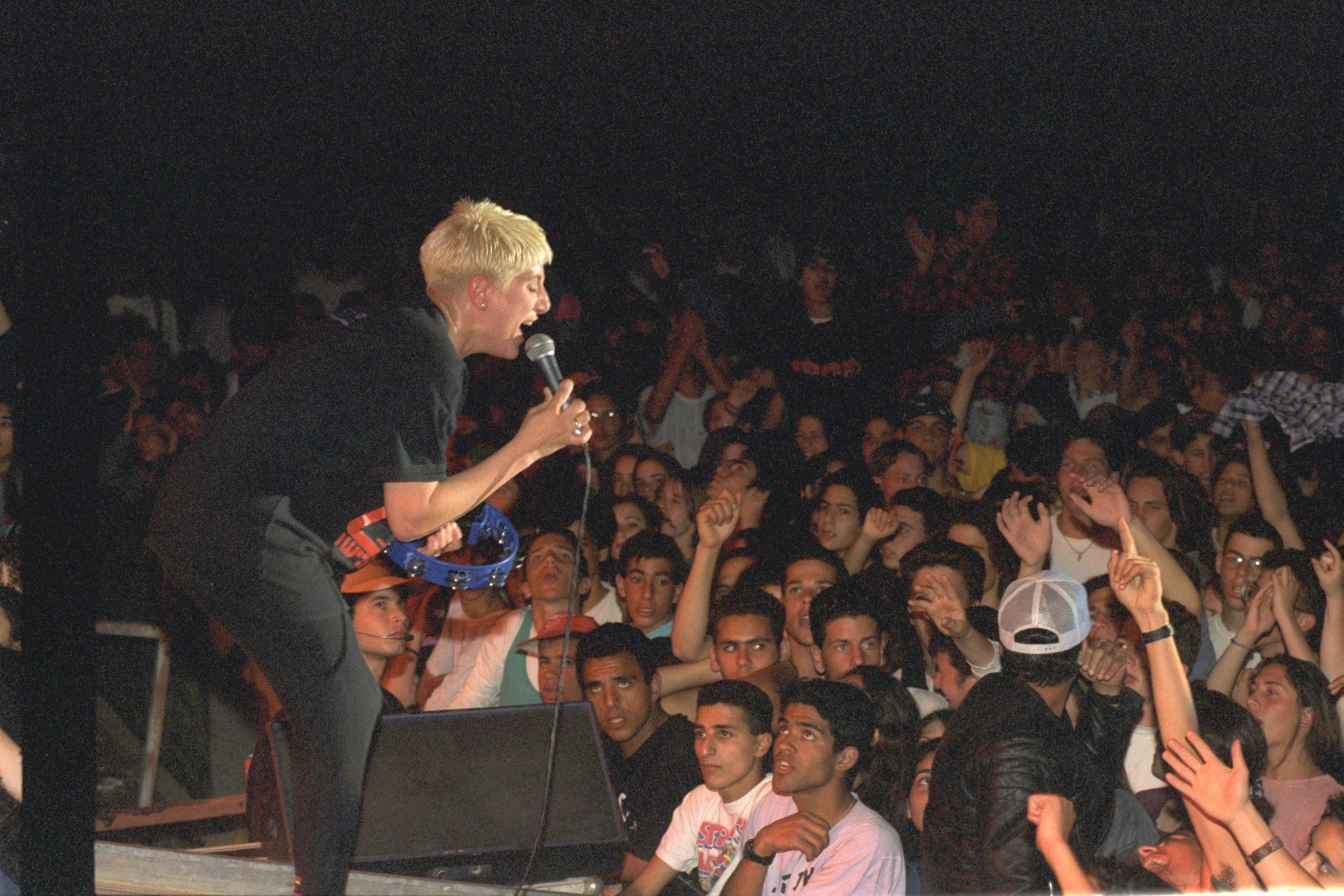
Si Heyman performing at a rock festival in the Red Sea

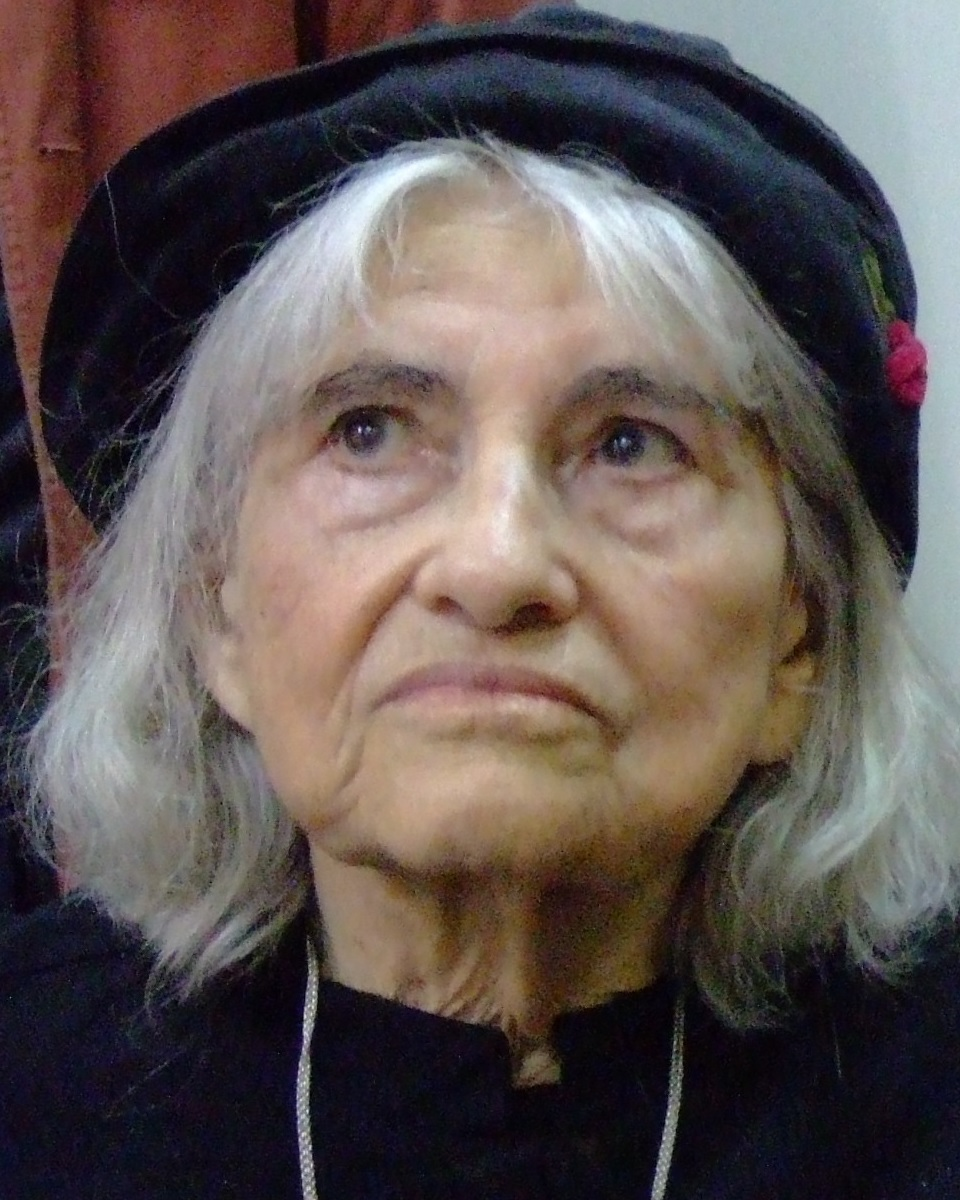
Naomi Frankel

While serving as Israel's (12th) Chief of Staff and after retiring from the army, Moshe Levi lived in Beit Alfa. In his later years, he was the founding chairperson of the supervisory board of Highway 6, also known as the Trans-Israel Highway. Levi died from a stroke in 2008 and was buried at the kibbutz, with eight generals carrying his body, top government officials, and hundreds who knew and worked with him in attendance.

Actor, writer, producer, comedian Seth Rogen's parents met in Beit Alfa.

Gabriel "Gavrush" Rapoport (1924–2001) was a Palmach and IDF combat veteran, who helped create Israel's famed heavy equipment rescue unit that has saved lives around the world. Gavrush was one of the first children born on the kibbutz. According to Haaretz, Israeli poet and writer Haim Gouri, a friend of Rapoport, said: "When Gavrush was born, the midwife fainted. Never before had an infant come out of the womb holding a revolver in one hand, and an adjustable wrench in the other".

Israeli novelist Naomi Frankel (1918–2009) joined the kibbutz in her teens and left it in 1970. Although she later changed her political ideology from left to right, she asked to be buried on the kibbutz beside her first husband. Frankel rose to fame with the publication of her trilogy Shaul ve-Yohannah (Saul and Joanna, 1956–1967), which depicted Jewish life in prewar Germany.

Songwriter and composer Nachum Heiman, an Israel Prize laureate, moved to the kibbutz with his second wife, and their two daughters were born there, one of them singer Si Heiman.

Israel Zamir (1929–2014), son of Jewish-American author Isaac Bashevis Singer, lived on the kibbutz for 77 years until his death in 2014. After his passing, he was buried at the kibbutz. Like his father, he was also a writer.

Israeli cartoonist Maya Devir was born in Beit Alfa.

== In Israeli Culture ==
Beit Alfa is repeatedly mentioned in the Natan Alterman-penned lyrics to the classic 1934 song, "Shir HaEmek" (Song of the Valley), about the Jezreel Valley.

== See also ==
- Archaeology of Israel
- Economy of Israel
- Tourism in Israel

== Bibliography ==
- Conder, C.R.; Kitchener, H.H. (1882). The Survey of Western Palestine: Memoirs of the Topography, Orography, Hydrography, and Archaeology. Vol. 2. London: Committee of the Palestine Exploration Fund. (p. 121)
- Guérin, Victor (1874). Description Géographique Historique et Archéologique de la Palestine (in French). Vol. 2: Samarie, pt. 1. Paris: L'Imprimerie Nationale. (p. 303)
- Palmer, E.H. (1881). The Survey of Western Palestine: Arabic and English Name Lists Collected During the Survey by Lieutenants Conder and Kitchener, R. E. Transliterated and Explained by E.H. Palmer. Committee of the Palestine Exploration Fund. ( p. 162)
