= Luke Burrage =

British juggler (born 1980)

Luke Burrage (born 26 August 1980) is a British juggler, musician, entertainer and author. He was born in Kent though lived most of his life in the north-east of England (North Yorkshire, County Durham and Newcastle-upon-Tyne). He has lived in Berlin, Germany since 2005.

== Juggling ==
Luke Burrage is a professional juggler who often works on cruise ships and at street show festivals in Europe. He is also very well known in the juggling community.

Burrage is a proficient numbers juggler. In 2003, he and Ben Beever set a new ball passing world record at 18 balls. They broke this world record again in 2008 by passing 19 balls between two people. Burrage was also the fourth person to claim to have juggled 12 balls for 12 catches.

Burrage is a popular guest at many national and international juggling conventions, where he performs and leads workshops. In 2004 he won the International Jugglers' Association People's Choice Award for his contribution to their festival. In 2007 Burrage and Pola Braendle performed a full-length show at the Israeli Juggling Convention entitled "Tonight", and their duo show "The Art of Juggling". They also performed in "Solas Circus", the European Juggling Convention Gala Show, Ireland, in 2006. Burrage is a popular show host and leads workshops on the subject.

He is a prominent figure in the development of modern juggling; popularising techniques such as squeeze catches performances that incorporate video projection, and alternate forms of juggling notation such as beatmap. Luke also helped develop the rules for two popular variations on the popular juggling game called Combat or Gladiators, called Team Combat and Fight Night, which are now regular events at many large juggling conventions.

In 2005 Burrage founded the British Young Juggler of the Year event, a show and competition that takes place at the British Juggling Convention, and was its organiser till 2009. The aim of the show is to encourage young jugglers to develop material for the stage and to showcase the best of young British juggling talent.

Burrage has written many articles, interview features, reviews, workshops and columns for Kaskade, the European juggling magazine. Between 2006 and 2009 he produced 63 episodes of the Juggling Podcast. He has also been active in the online juggling community since 1999, hosting a very popular juggling website between 2000 and 2003, releasing many juggling videos, and compiling the Top 40 Most Popular Jugglers of the Year chart since 2003.

== Other activities ==
Since January 2008, Burrage has produced and presented the Science Fiction Book Review Podcast, in which he reviews "every single science fiction book that I read, as I read it." On the podcast, Luke reports a regular listenership of between 3000–4000 per episode, plus a few hundred downloads of each old episode per month. He has also been a guest participant on the SFFaudio.com Podcast and Starship Sofa's Sofanaut Podcast.
