= Naomi Frankel =

Israeli novelist (1918–2009)

- נעמי פרנקל
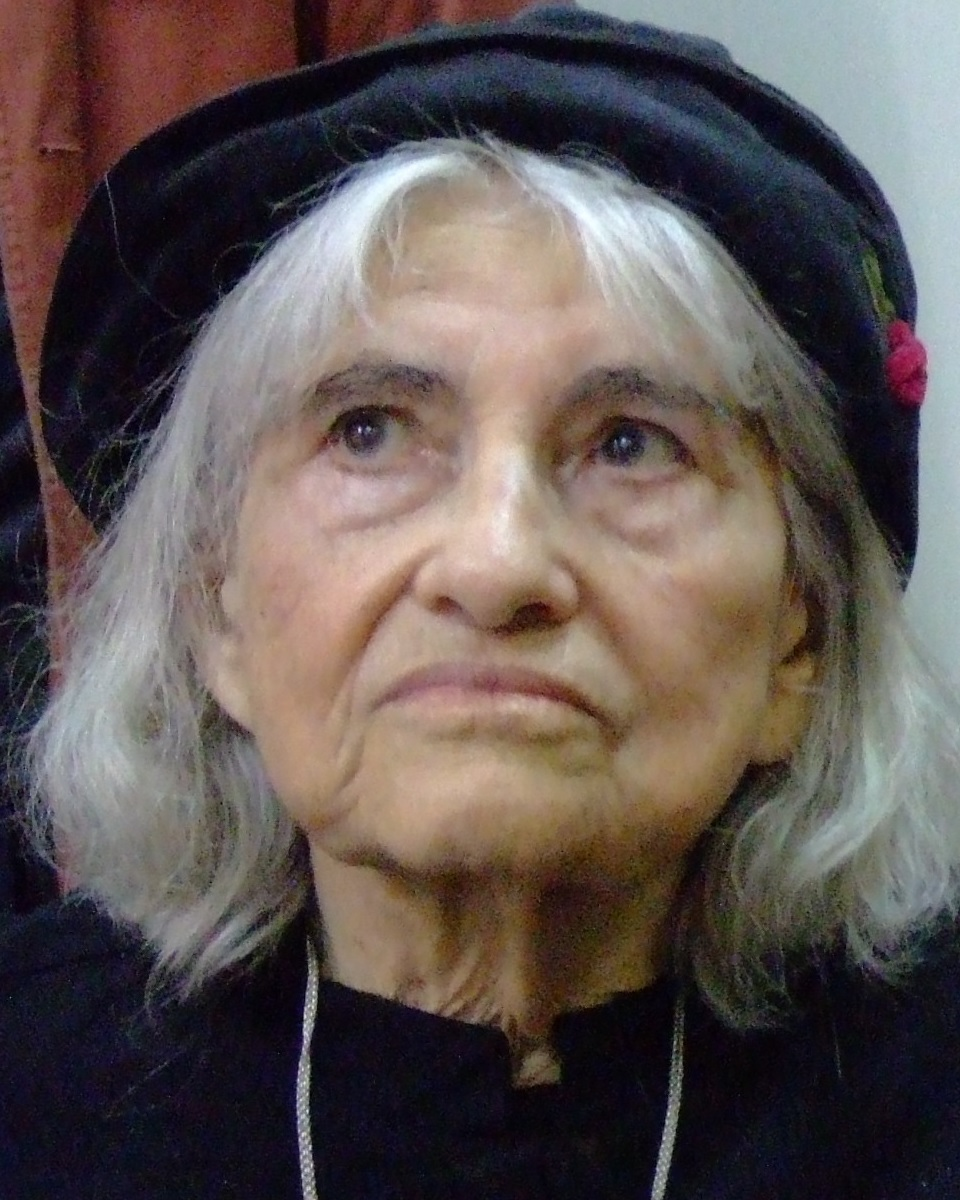
- Frankel in 2004
- Born: 20 November 1918; Berlin, Germany
- Died: 20 November 2009 (aged 91); Hebron, West Bank
- Resting place: Kibbutz Beit Alfa
- Education: Hebrew University of Jerusalem
- Occupation: Writer
- Spouses: Yeshayahu Beeri; Yisrael Rosenzweig; Meir Ben-Gur
- Children: 1
- Writing career
- Language: Hebrew
- Period: 1956–2003
- Notable works: Saul and Joanna trilogy (1956–1967)
- Notable awards: Ruppin Prize (1956)

Naomi Frankel (Hebrew: נעמי פרנקל; 20 November 1918 – 20 November 2009), also spelled Fraenkel and Frenkel, was a German-born Israeli novelist. Born in Berlin, she was evacuated to Mandatory Palestine with other German-Jewish children in 1933. She became a member of Kibbutz Beit Alfa, where she lived until 1970. She began writing novels in 1956 and achieved fame with her trilogy Shaul ve-Yohannah (Saul and Joanna), a three-generational tale of an assimilated German-Jewish family in prewar Germany. She wrote four other novels for adults as well as several books for children. In the 1980s Frankel abandoned her leftist convictions and adopted right-wing ideology, settling in the West Bank, where she died in 2009, aged 91.

== Early life and education ==
Naomi Frankel was born into an affluent, assimilated Jewish family in Berlin, Germany on 20 November 1918. Her mother died when she was two. Her father worked in the family factory set up by her grandfather. In her youth, she joined the Socialist-Zionist Hashomer Hatzair movement. Her father died in 1932 and she was taken under the care of a guardian, who helped her escape Nazi Germany with other Jewish children who were evacuated by the community and sent to British-administered Mandatory Palestine in 1933.

Frankel initially lived in a girls' orphanage in Jerusalem. Then she moved to Mishmar HaEmek, a leftist kibbutz in Northern Israel. She attended an agricultural school for girls and went on to study Jewish history and Kabbalah at the Hebrew University of Jerusalem. During the 1948 Arab–Israeli War, she fought in the Palmach brigade.

== Literary career ==
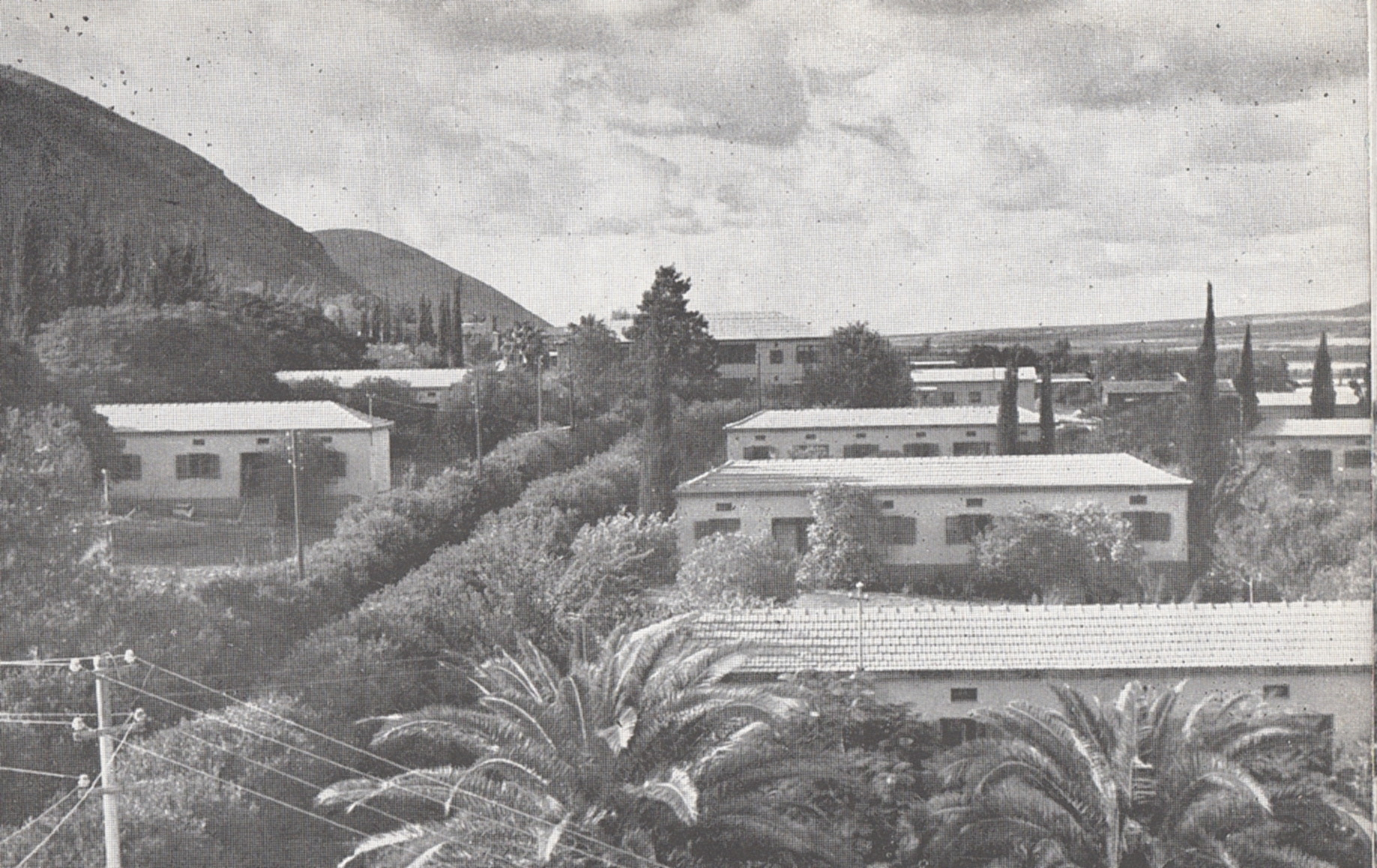
Kibbutz Beit Alfa, circa 1948–1951

After the 1948 war, Frankel divided her time between working on the kibbutz and writing. She achieved fame with the publication of her first novel, Shaul ve-Yohannah (Saul and Joanna), the first part of a trilogy published between 1956 and 1967. The trilogy is a fictionalized account of three generations of an assimilated German-Jewish family whose granddaughter joins a Zionist youth movement. In depicting the rise and fall of prewar German-Jewish culture, Frankel concludes that only Zionism and a strong Jewish state can protect the Jewish people from persecution. One of the first books published in Israel that dealt with Jewish life in prewar Germany, Shaul ve-Yohannah, aroused strong feelings among German-Jewish immigrants to Israel, and also met with critical success. Having returned to Berlin to do research for the first volume in the 1950s, in 1960 Frankel received a scholarship from the Anne Frank Foundation that enabled her to undertake an additional 18 months of research in Berlin for the second and third volumes.

Frankel turned to other subjects in subsequent novels, including Israeli military heroes, Spanish marranos—Christians of Jewish descent who practiced Judaism in secret—and the Jewish settlement of Hebron in the West Bank. She also published several novels for children. Many of her books were translated into German and English, and some were adapted for radio and television.

=== Literary awards ===
Frankel received the Ruppin Prize in 1956 for Shaul ve-Yohannah. She received the Ussishkin Prize in 1962, the Prime Minister's Prize for Hebrew Literary Works in 1970, the Walter Schwimmer Award for Journalism in 1972, and the Neumann Prize in 2005.

== Other activities ==
Frankel left Kibbutz Beit Alfa in 1970 after her second husband's death (Yisrael Rosenzweig), and moved to Tel Aviv following her marriage to her third husband (Meir Ben-Gur). From 1970 to 1978 she worked for the Israeli Navy, editing classified army and navy protocols from the period before and after the Yom Kippur War, and attained the rank of rav-seren (lieutenant commander).

== Political views ==
I recognize the fact that there's a fight for the land between the Jews and the Arabs. I have a simple truth to say: This is my country. I have no place to live. This is my land, my culture, my language, and I'm not prepared to live in any other country. So if somebody's trying to kick me out of here, I'm going to struggle for my rights.

— Naomi Frankel, 1988

In the 1980s Frankel abandoned her leftist convictions of many decades and adopted right-wing ideology. She began observing the Jewish Sabbath and kosher dietary laws, and in 1982 moved with her second husband to the West Bank settlement of Kiryat Arba. She later lived in Hebron until her death. She frequently wrote and spoke out in support of the concept of a Greater Israel. Her break with left-wing ideology caused the left-leaning arts community to shun her.

== Personal life ==
Frankel's first husband was Yeshayahu (Shaek) Beeri from Mishmar HaEmek, with whom she had two daughters. After divorce, she married Yisrael Rosenzweig, her literature editor and a teacher from Kibbutz Beit Alfa, with whom she had one daughter. After Rosenzweig's death in 1969 she married Meir Ben-Gur, a journalist.

Frankel died on 20 November 2009, her 91st birthday. In accordance with her wishes, she was buried in Kibbutz Beit Alfa beside her second husband.

== Bibliography ==
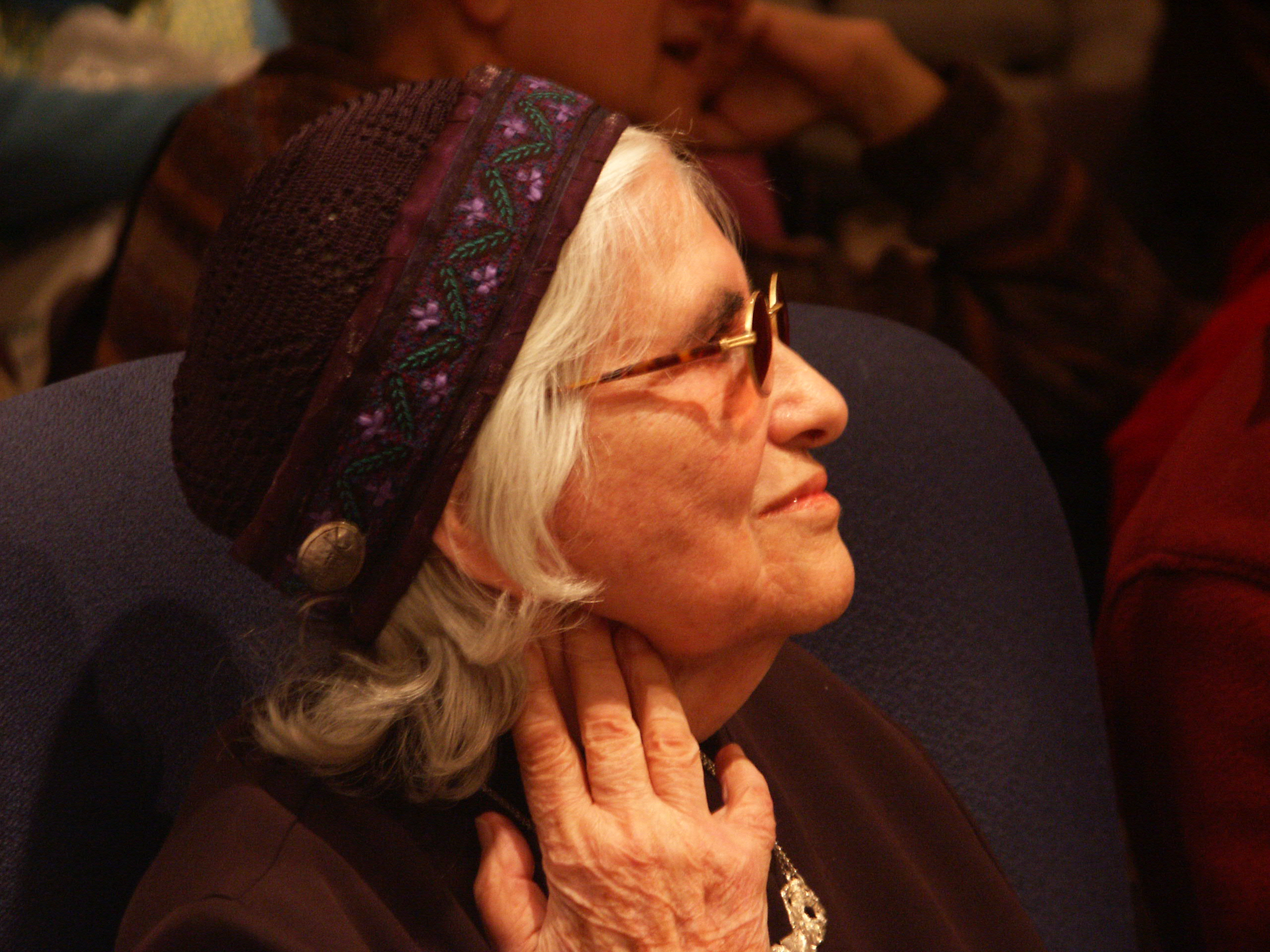
Frankel in 2001

Frankel wrote the following books:

=== Adult novels ===
- Shaul ve-Yohannah (Saul and Joanna) (Sifriat Po'alim, Vol. 1: 1956, Vol. 2: 1962; Vol. 3: 1967) Other editions: Am Oved, 1976; Gefen, 1999
- Dodi ve-Re'ee (My Beloved Friend) (Am Oved, 1973; Gefen, 2000)
- Tzemach Bar (Wild Flower) (Am Oved, 1981; Gefen, 2000)
- Barkai (Morning Star) (Gefen, 1999)
- Predah (Farewell) (Gefen, 2003)

=== Children's books ===
- Na'ar Tzamach Bi-Gdot HaAssi (A Boy Growing Up on the Banks of the Assi) (Ministry of Defense, 1977)
- Racheli Ve-HaIshon (Racheli and the Little Man) (E. Lewin-Epstein, 1972; Am Oved, 1975, 1988)
