= Shlomo Gur =

Founding member of Kibbutz Tel Amal

Shlomo Gur (Gerzovsky) (Hebrew: שלמה גור; 1913–2000), founding member of Kibbutz Tel Amal, designed and managed the construction of 57 homa u'migal (tower and stockade settlements) during the 1936–39 Arab revolt in Palestine. After the establishment of the State of Israel, he was project manager of the Hebrew University, the National Library and the Knesset.

In summer 1936, the expanding Arab revolt endangered the Jewish population of Beit She'an Valley. Concerned with safety and security, Shlomo Gur and other members of Kibbutz Tel Amal built the first homa u'migal settlement. Subsequently, Shlomo Gur consulted Jerusalem architect Yohanan Ratner and was provided with blueprints for the other settlements.

Shlomo Gur was the first director of Israel's Military research department.

== Gallery ==
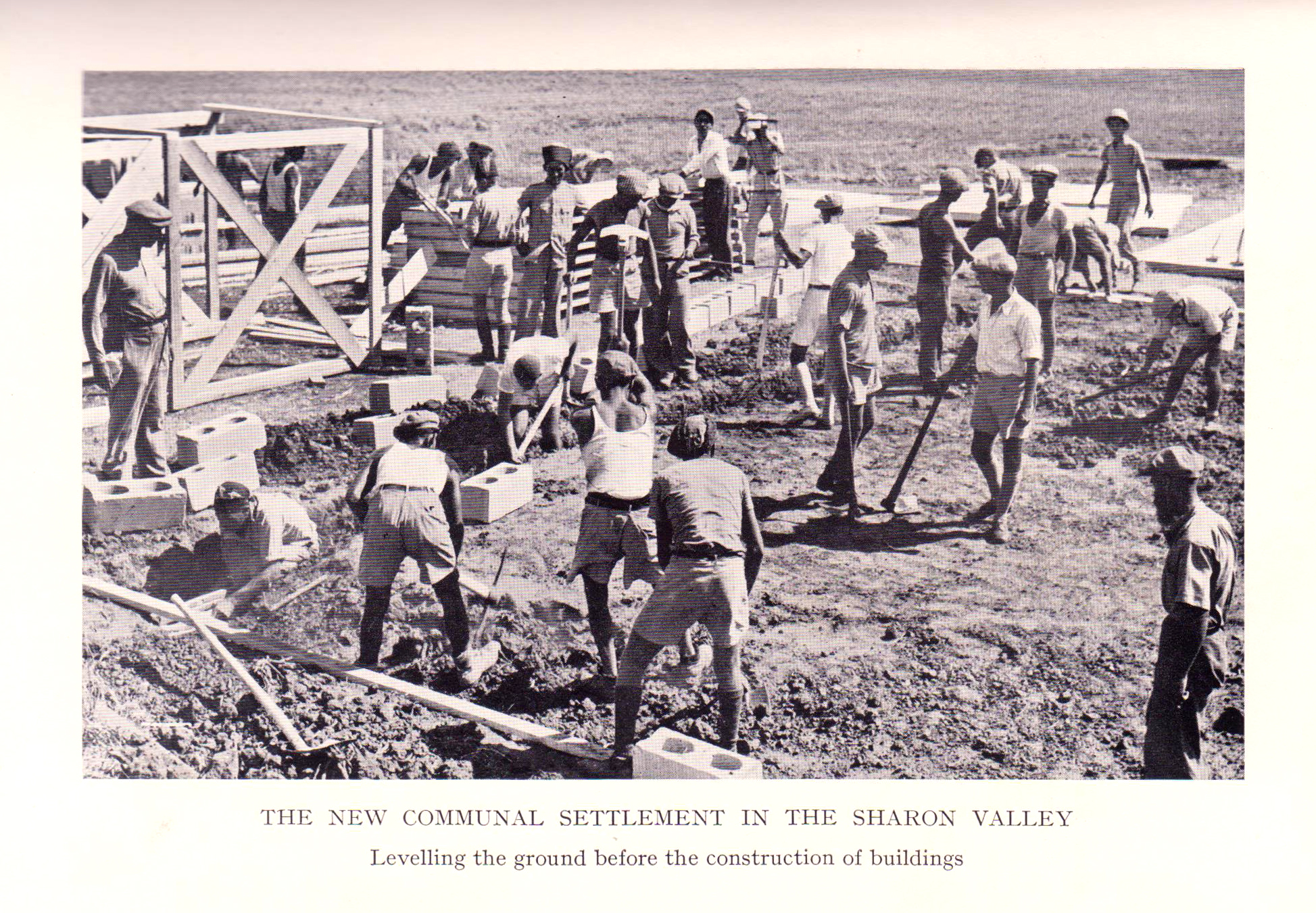
Preparing the foundations; watch tower being assembled on left; two Palestine Policemen in center.

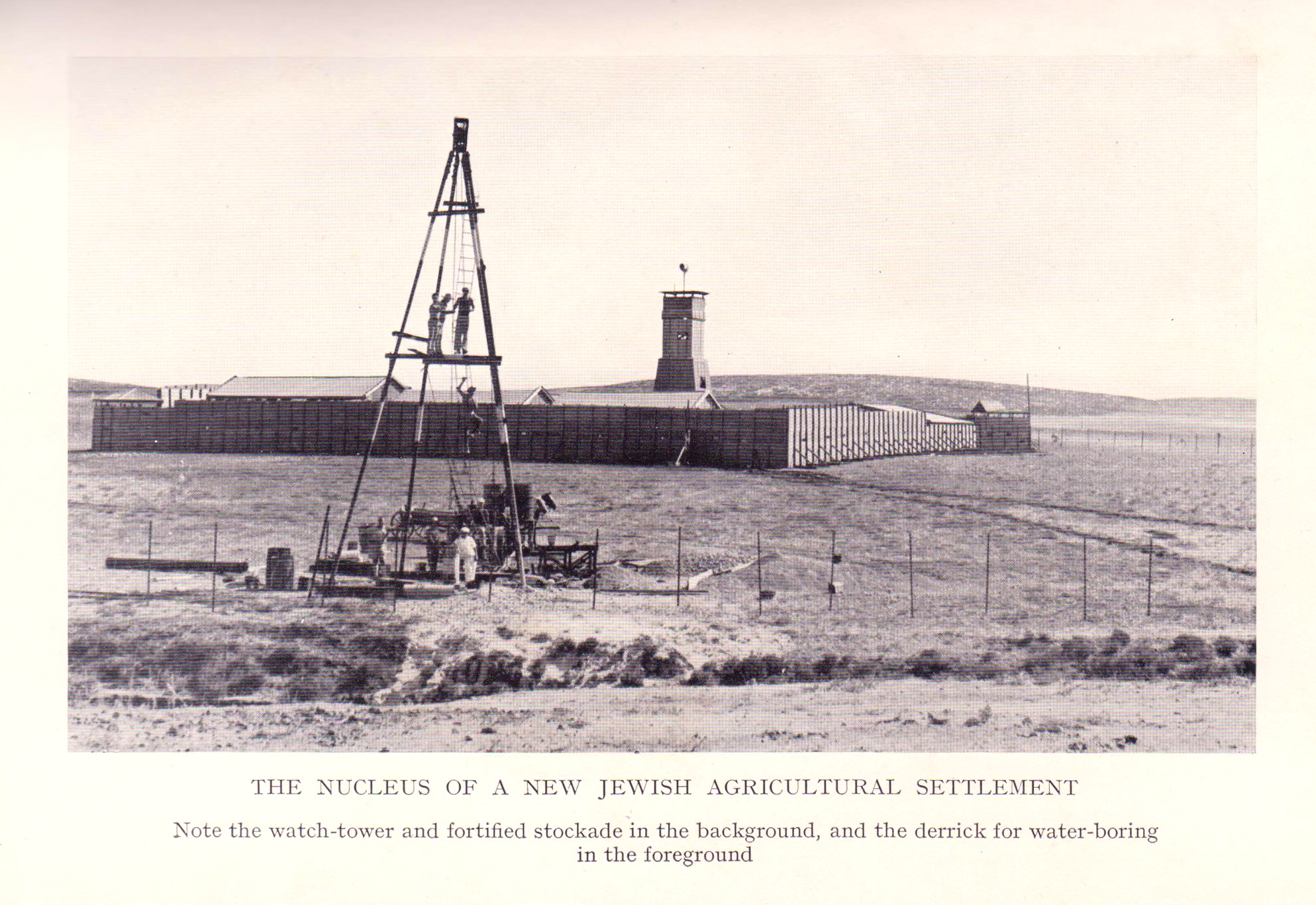
Fully constructed Homa Umigal in the Galilee; drilling for water in foreground.

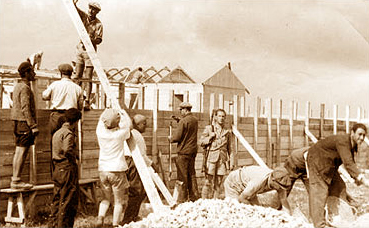
Shavei Tzion under construction.

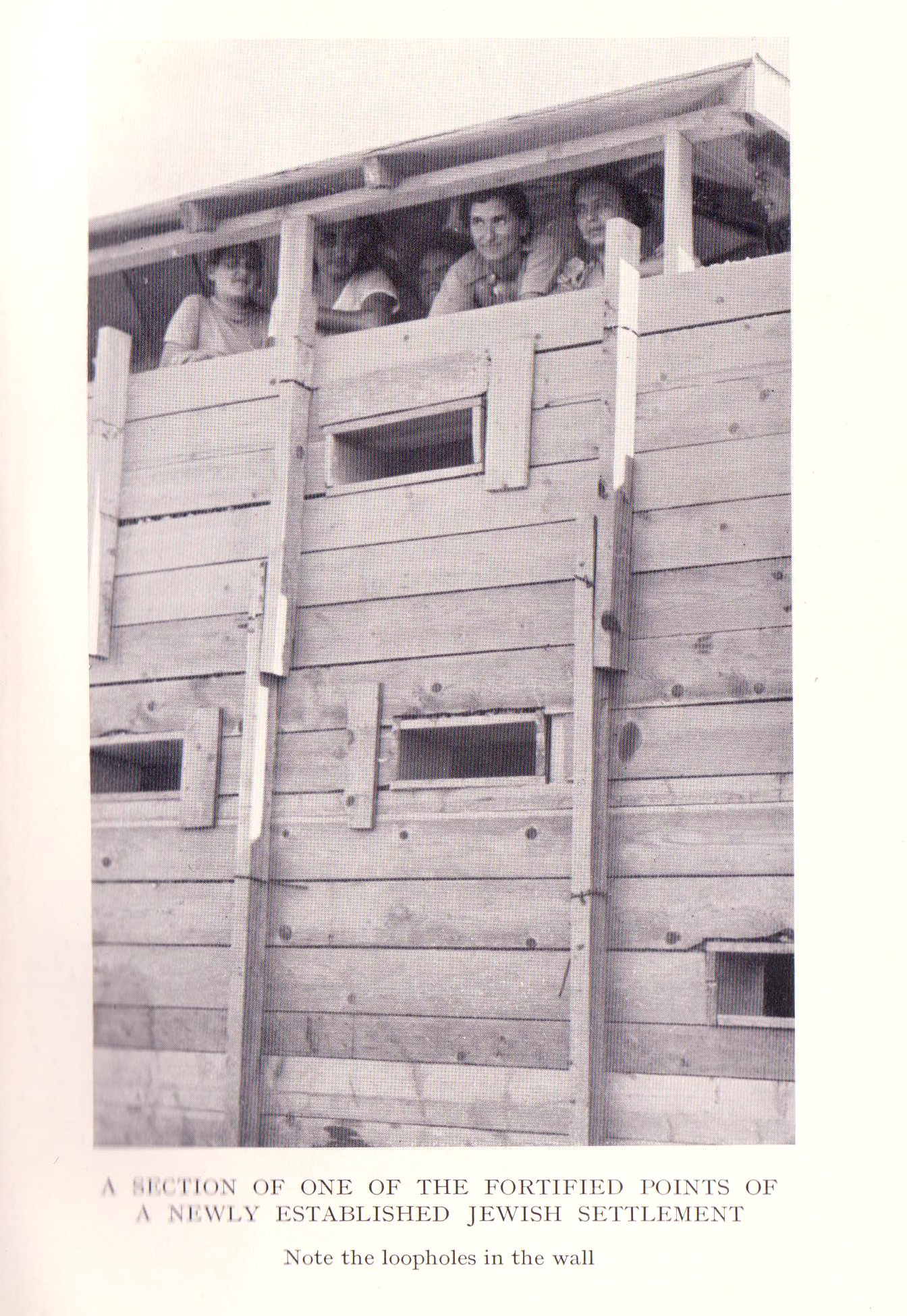
Gun positions and observation platform.

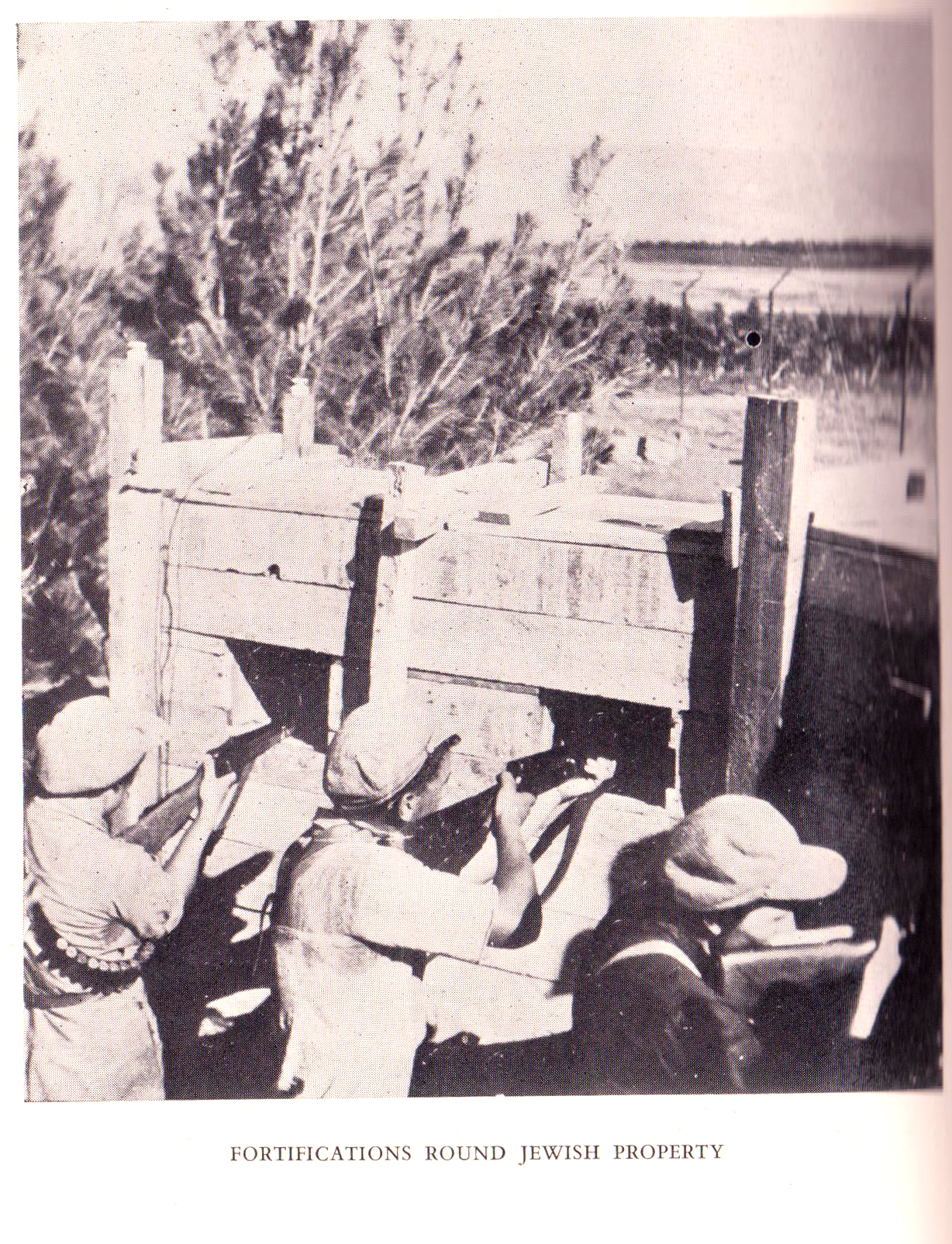
Wall filled with earth and barbed wire perimeter fence.

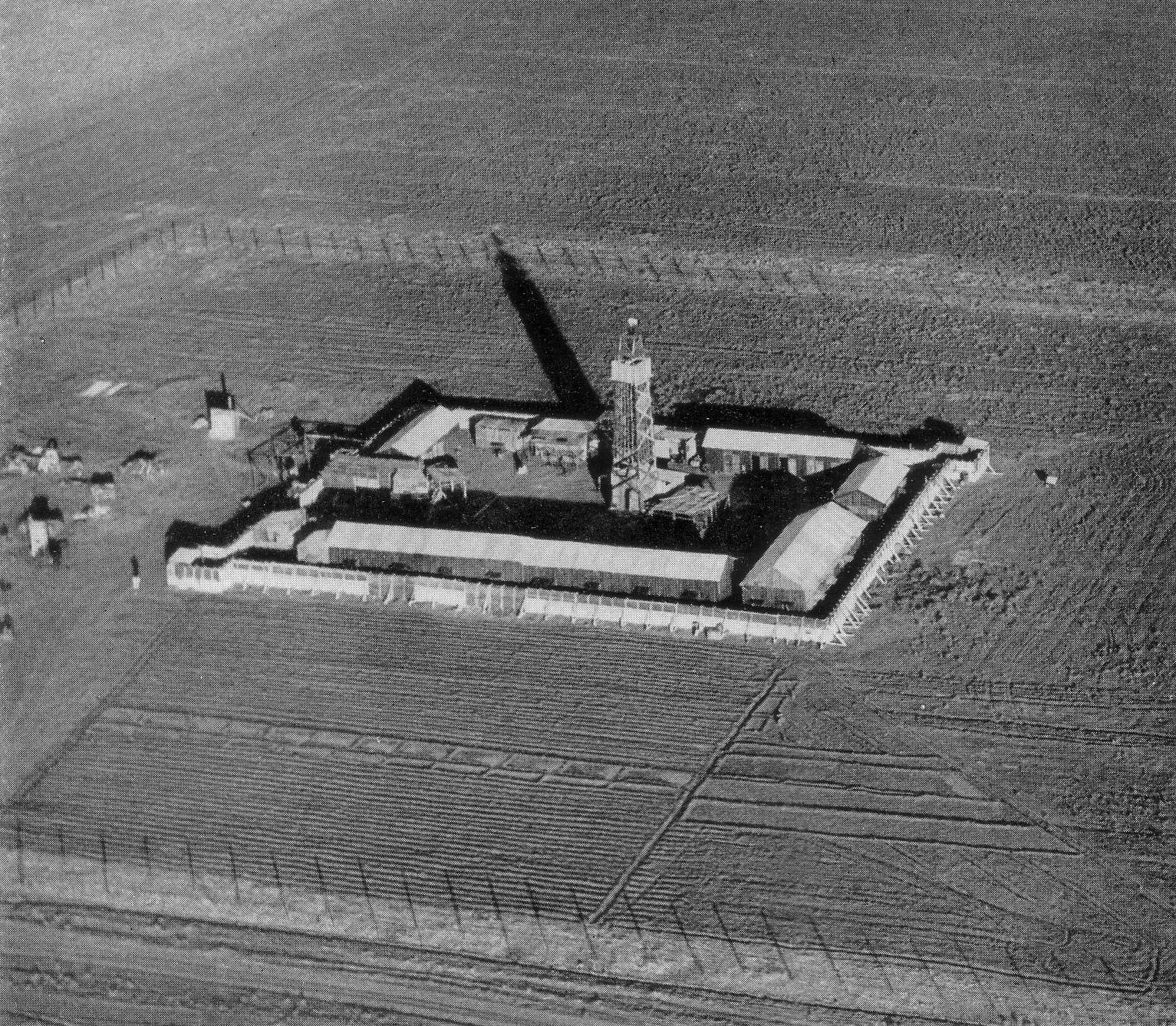
Aerial view of Bet Yosef, 1938.

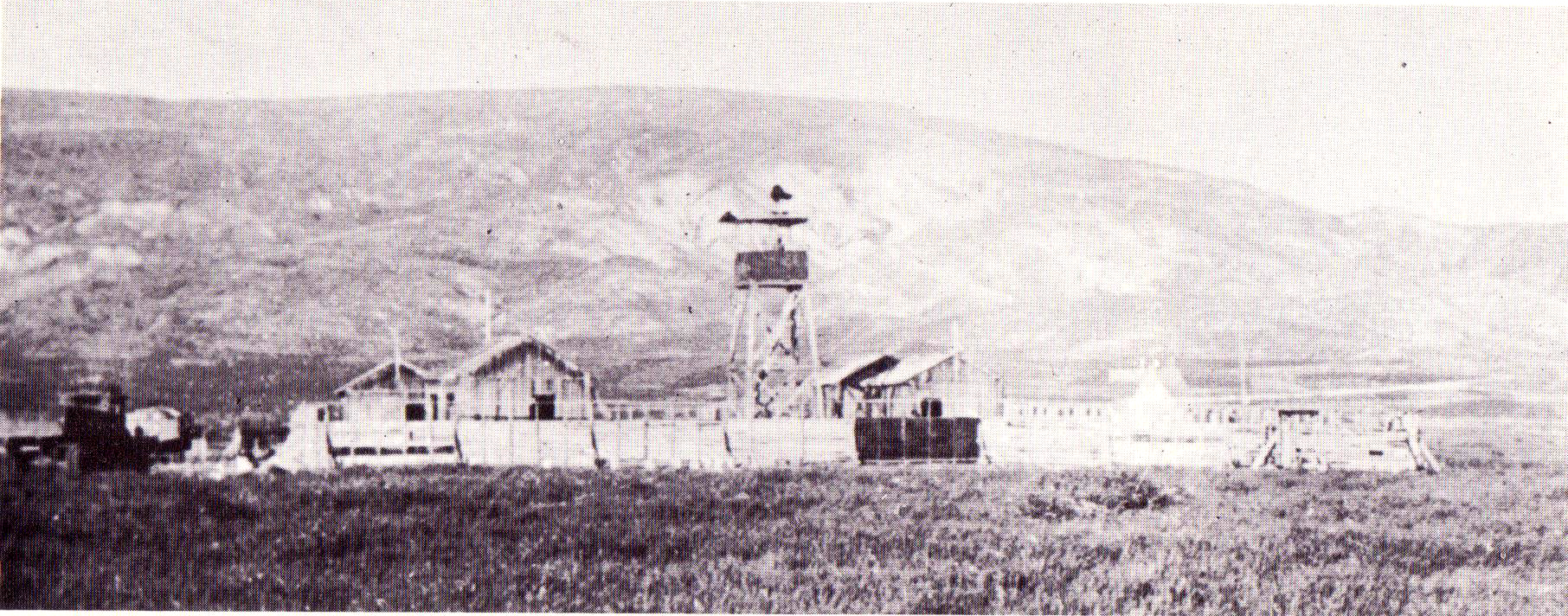
Sha'ar Hagolan, Palestine, 1937

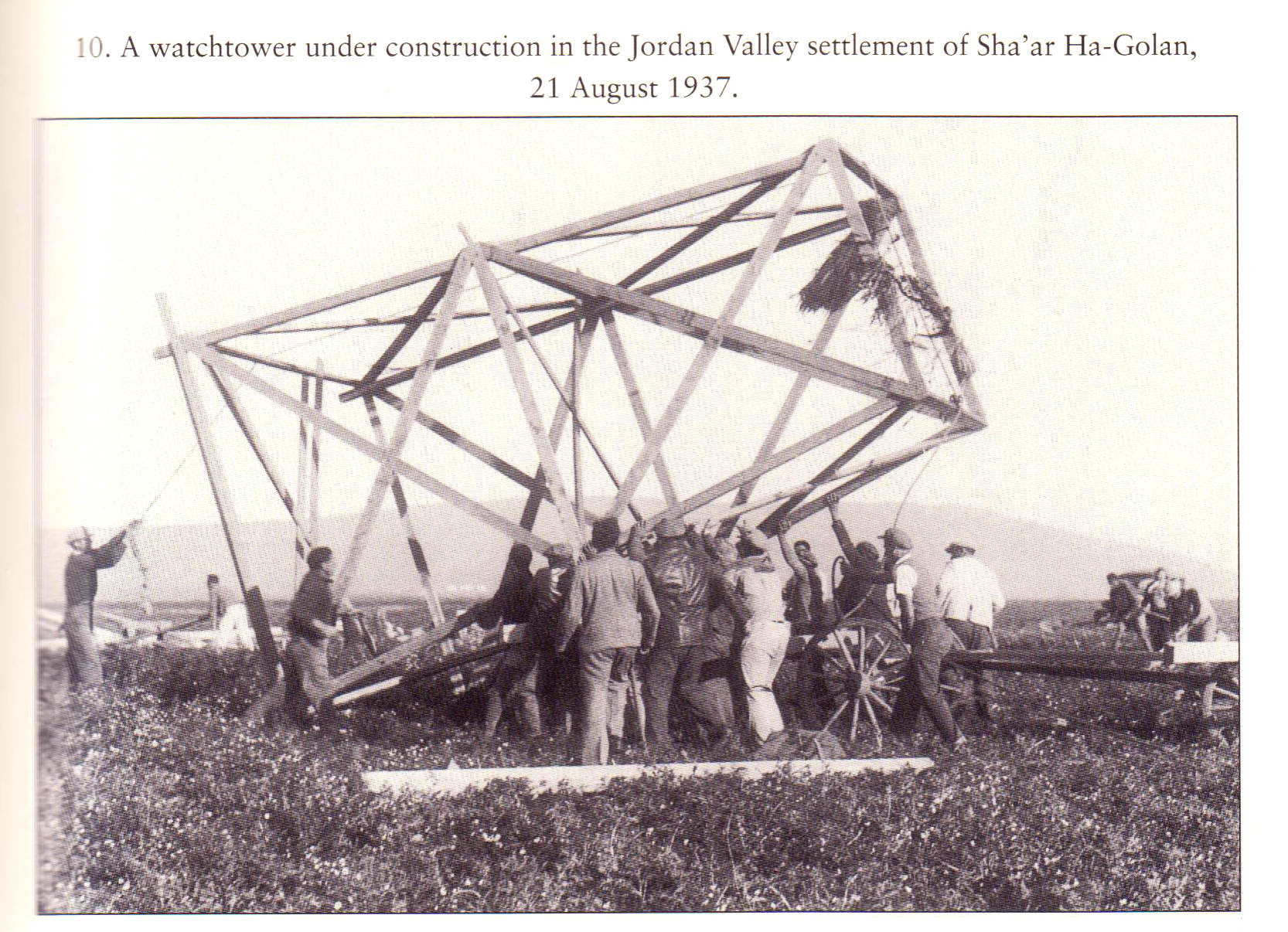
The watchtower being erected at Sha'ar Hagolan, 21 August 1937.

== See also ==
- Tegart fort
