= Gan HaShlosha National Park =

National park in Israel

Coordinates: 32°30′20″N 35°26′52″E

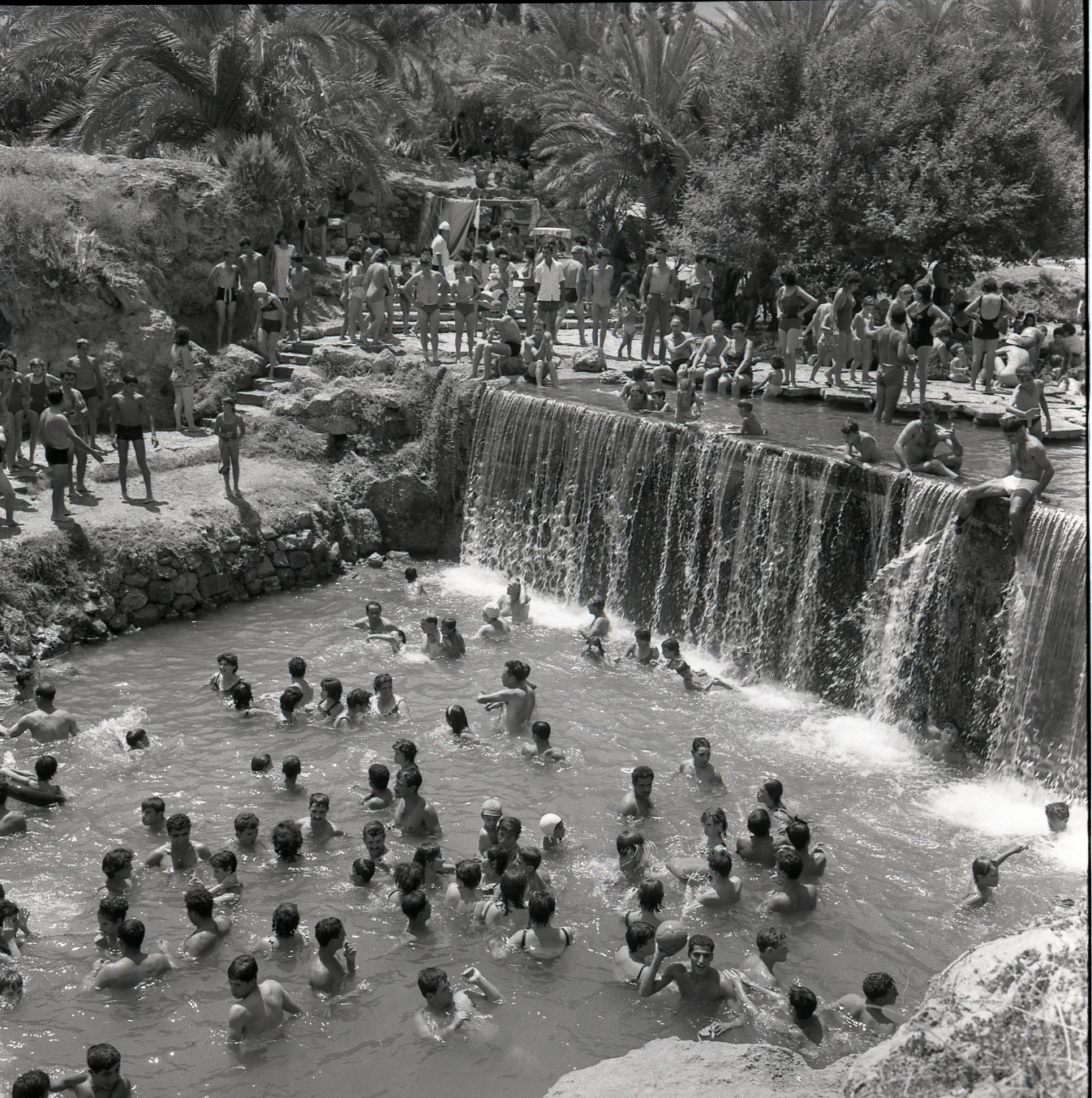
Swimmers in Gan Hashlosha, 1962

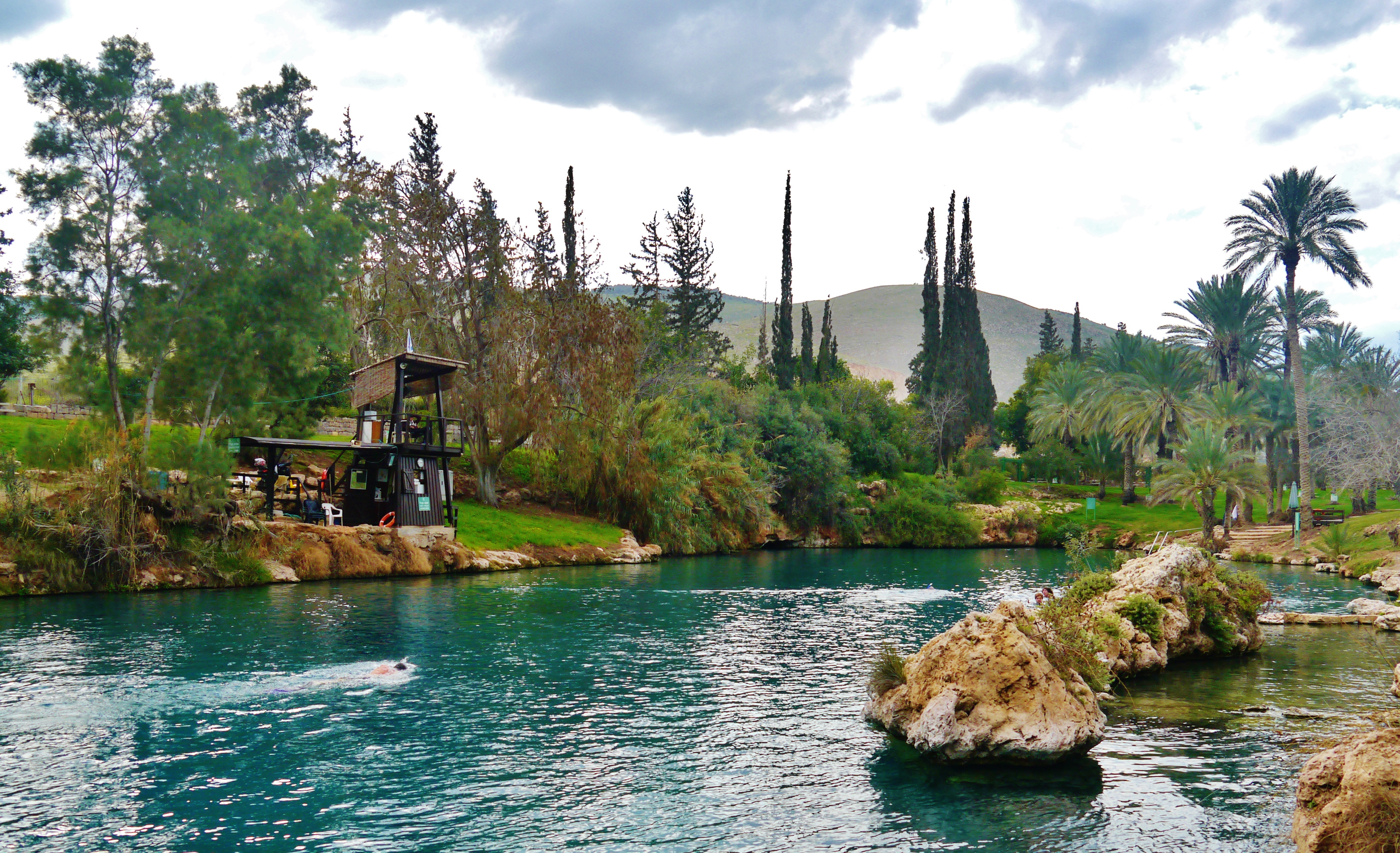
Natural warm water pool at Gan HaShlosha

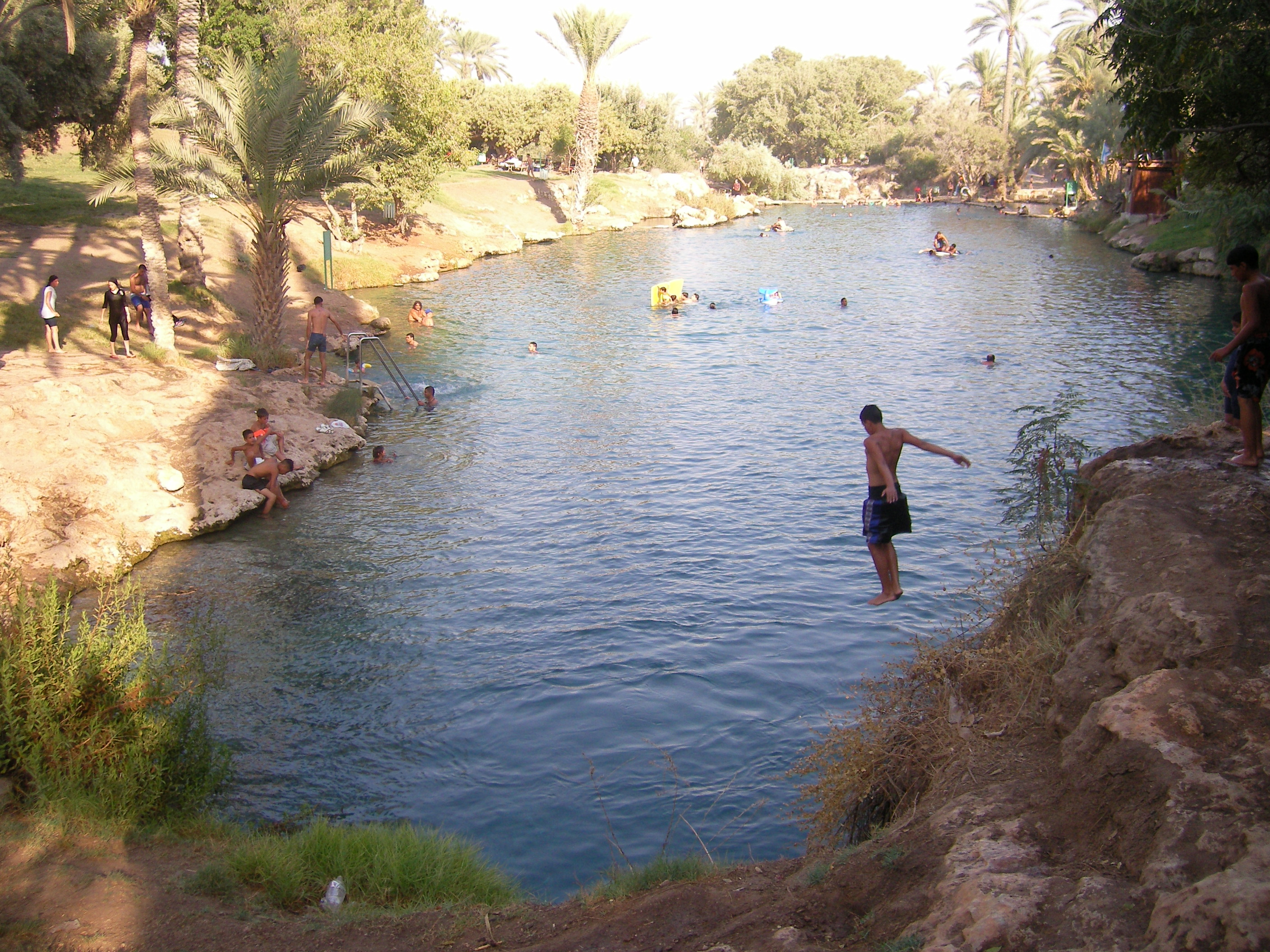
Natural warm water pool at Gan HaShlosha

Gan HaShlosha National Park (Hebrew: גן השלושה gan hashloshá, literally: "Park of the three"), also known by its Arabic name Sahne or Sakhne (Arabic: الساخنة, literally: "The hot [pool]"), is a national park in Israel. Located between kibbutzim Beit Alfa and Nir David, it has naturally warm water where visitors can swim all year. It is named in memory of three Jewish pioneers who came to survey the land on behalf of the Jewish National Fund in 1938 driven by Avraham Biran and an unnamed British Mandate Officer. Their car rode over a land mine and all three were killed.

The spring water that emerges in the western part of the park maintains a constant, year-round temperature of 28 degrees Celsius. Amal Stream, which crosses the park, has been widened into pools.

An old water-powered mill operates at the site and an adjacent madafeh, or Arab hospitality room, has been restored. A 1:1 reconstruction of Tel Amal, one of the first "Tower and Stockade" settlements set up by Jewish pioneers during the 1936–39 Arab Revolt – in this case on 10 December 1936 – is located in the park.

The Museum of Regional and Mediterranean Archaeology is located on the grounds of the park. It houses a display of rare Greek tools, artifacts from excavations in the Beit She’an Valley and an exhibit about the Etruscans.

The park is also home to the Israeli Juggling Convention, the second-largest juggling convention in the world, drawing in over 2,000 jugglers each year.

== In popular culture ==
"The Garden of Eden," a film about Gan HaShlosha, premiered at the Jerusalem Film Festival in July 2012 and won Israeli filmmaker Ran Tal an award for best director of a documentary. The film was screened at the DocAviv Galilee festival in Ma'alot-Tarshiha in November 2012.

== See also ==
- Tourism in Israel
- National parks of Israel
- Nir David
