= Maya and Yehuda Devir =

Israeli comic artists (born 1989 and 1988)

- מאיה ויהודה דביר
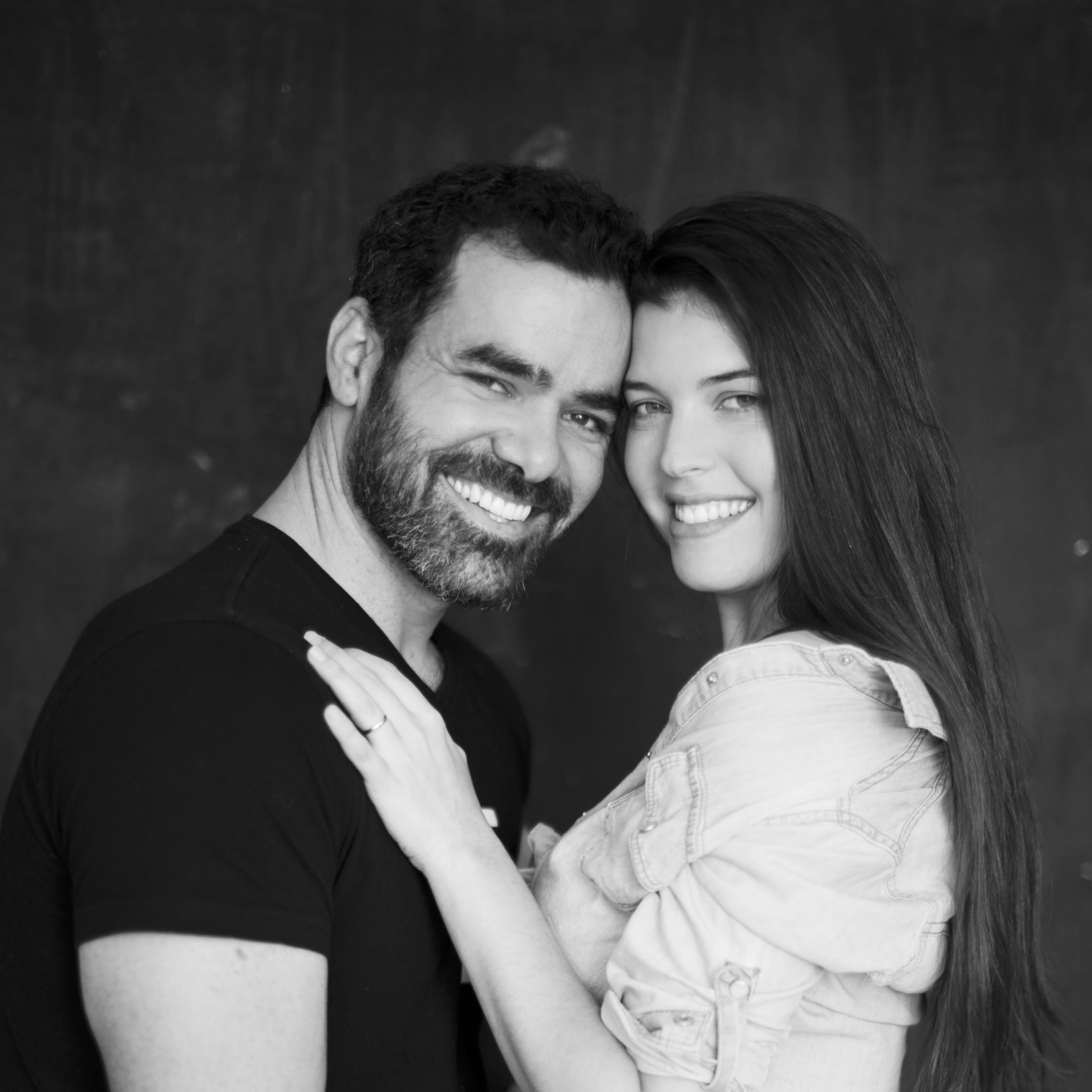
- Yehuda (left) and Maya Devir in 2020
- Born: Maya Zeltzer: June 1989 (age 37); Yehuda Devir: October 1988 (age 37)
- Education: Bezalel Academy of Arts and Design
- Known for: One of Those Days one frame series
- Style: comics
- Children: 3
- Website: Official website

Maya Devir (Hebrew: מאיה דביר; born June 1989) and Yehuda Devir (יהודה דביר; born October 1988) are married Israeli comic artists who illustrate their life together through humorous one-frame drawings in the style of American comic books. Their main webcomic series, One of Those Days, has been released online generally weekly since 2016. The series has gained international popularity, and has been collected in five books published in multiple languages. The Devirs' Instagram account on which the series is posted has become one of the most followed of all Israeli Instagram accounts. They have also released a drawing course and a series of NFT romantic fantasy artworks, and appeared as animated characters in online and television advertisements.

== Early lives ==
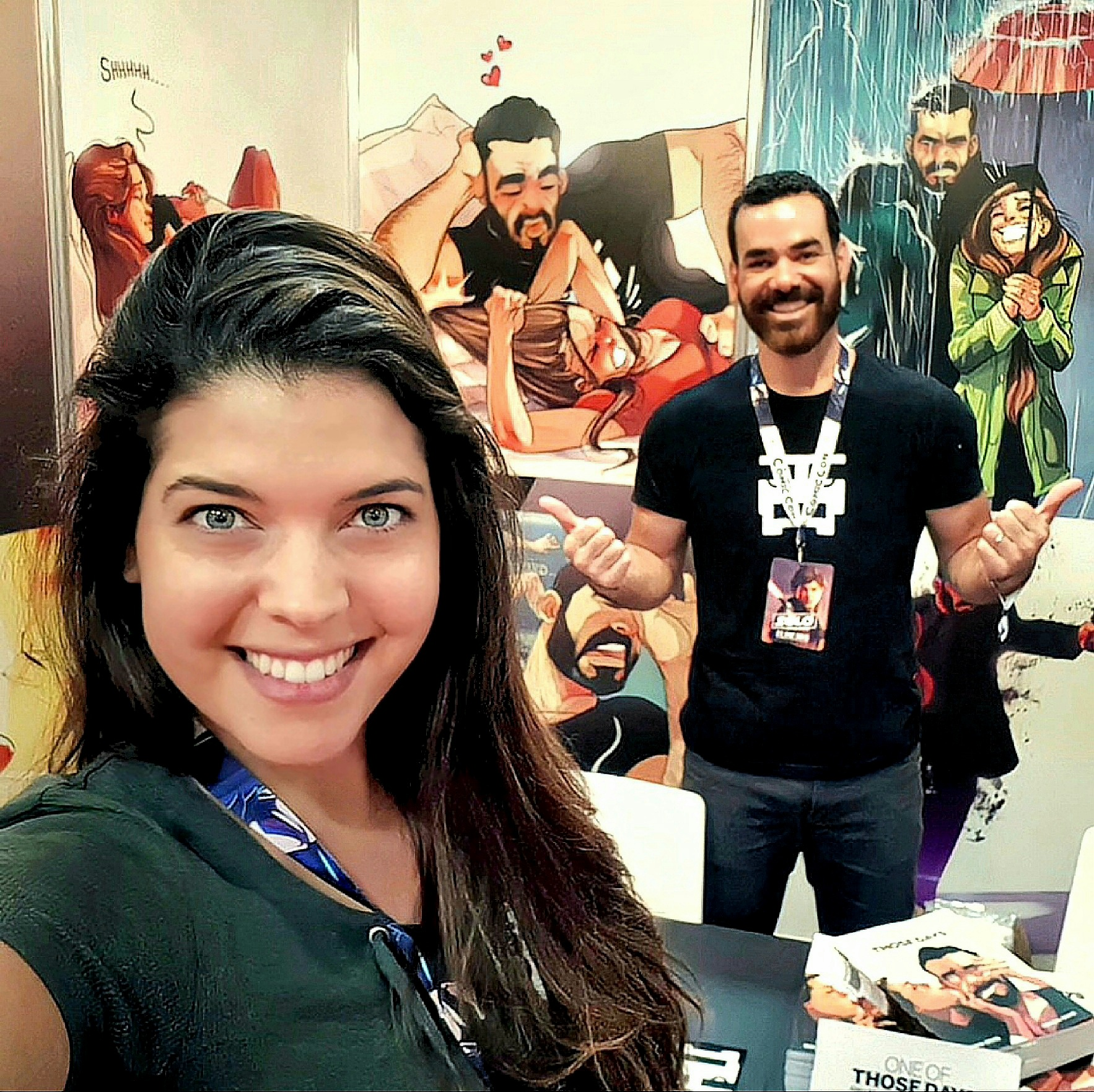
Maya (left) and Yehuda Devir with their artwork in 2018

Maya Devir was born named Maya Zeltzer (Hebrew: מאיה זלצר) in June 1989 in Beit Alfa, a kibbutz in northern Israel. Her mother originally came from Morocco. She served in the Israel Defence Forces from 2007 to 2010 as a captain and Human Resources Officer. She attended Bezalel Academy of Arts and Design from 2012 to 2016 in the Visual Communications department, including spending spring 2015 in the University of the Arts in Philadelphia in an exchange program. After graduating, she worked as an art director in an advertising agency.

Yehuda Adi Devir was born in October 1988. He grew up at the Nevatim Airbase and later in Reut. He has been drawing from a very young age, when, he says, his first action with a pencil was to draw on his parents' wall. Rather than criticize him, his father joined him, then at night, repainted the wall so he could draw on it again the next day. Yehuda Devir's first job was as a doorman in a pub when he was 16 years old; he says he was already large and imposing enough that he could prevent older people from entering.

Yehuda Devir also earned a Bachelor of Design in Visual Communication from the Bezalel Academy of Arts and Design in Jerusalem in 2016. He says that he was never a good student and was reluctant to go to school again after high school, but Maya convinced him to come with her to Bezalel and get a degree in drawing, which he liked. His graduation project was Cinephile, an 11 meter long, 2 meter high mural of 300 scenes and characters from famous films from 1920 to 2016. 9 meters of it was exhibited at the Leiden International Film Festival in the Netherlands in October 2017. After graduating, he worked as a freelance illustrator, trying to build a reputation; he made drawings for a children's book, RiZoKo, The Journey Begins (Hebrew: ריזוקו - המסע מתחיל), and the Static & Ben El Tavori video "Kawaii". In August 2017, he was selected as Print magazine's designer of the week.

The couple met in 2009, during their required military service in the Israel Defence Forces, when they were friends before beginning any romance. Maya thought it would be a disaster to become romantically involved with someone on the same closed base, so waited to begin dating until 2010, after they were released. They married in July 2016, immediately after graduating Bezalel together. Initially, the couple lived in Tel Aviv, Israel.

== One of Those Days ==
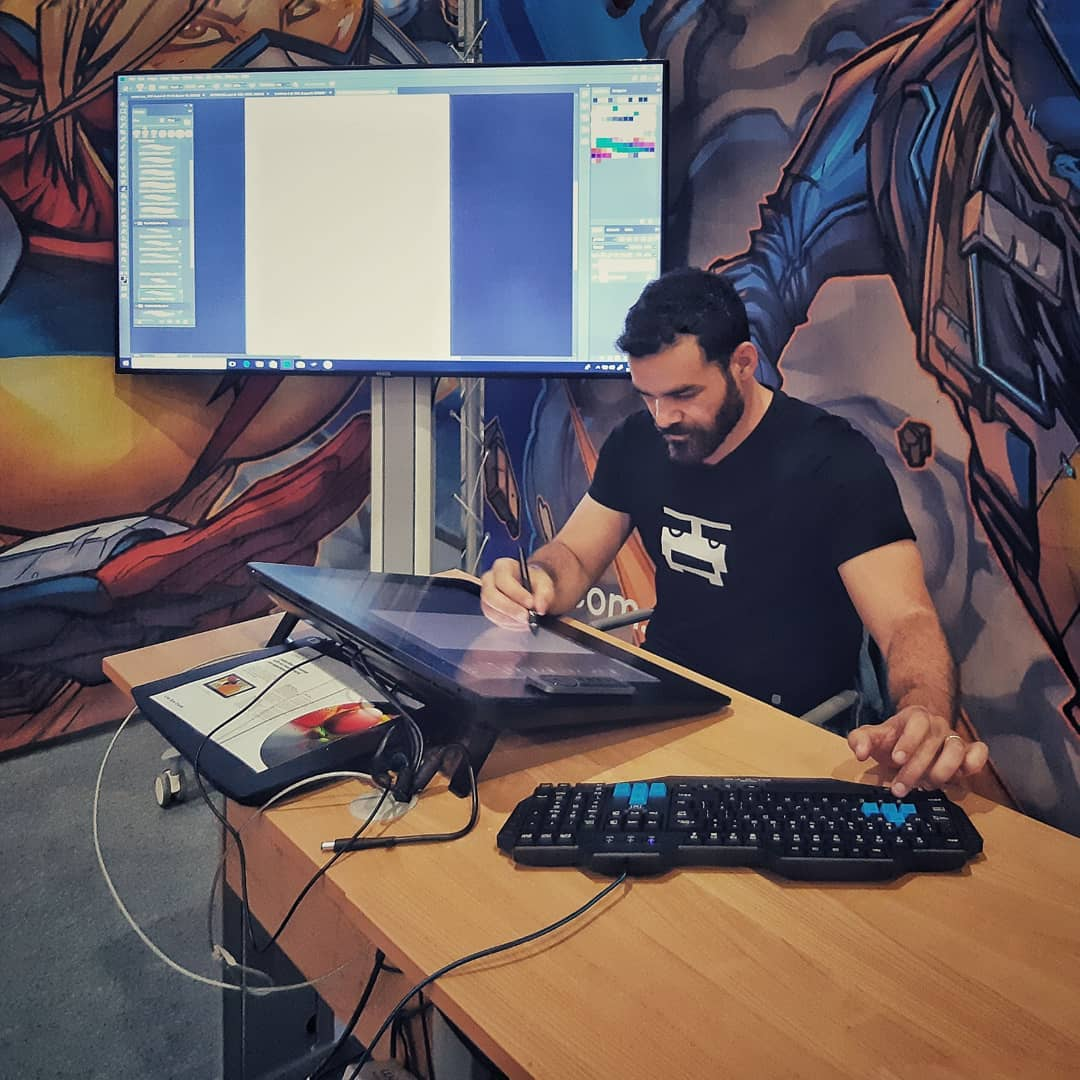
Yehuda Devir drawing in 2018

Maya and Yehuda Devir illustrate their relationship in One of Those Days (Hebrew: "כל כך אנחנו!", lit. 'That's so us!'), a series of single-frame comic panels. The webcomic series originally began on their social media accounts, and each comic is based on a real event in the Devirs' life together (with some exaggeration for artistic effect). They said: "We don't illustrate moments that didn't happen to us because otherwise it would harm the authenticity of the story."

The panels are in the style of American superhero comics or pinups, with Yehuda portrayed as tall and muscular, and Maya as cute and shapely. Yehuda has been criticized for representing himself and his wife with idealized bodies; he says that is the fun of being the artist, he gets to depict things how he perceives them. Maya says that she definitely sees him as a superhero, and if he sees her as someone like Jessica Rabbit, she doesn't have a problem with that.

Yehuda is the main artist for the comics panels, while Maya, who is also a visual artist, is the art director, helps with concept, composition, and color choices, then serves as reviewer. They say the long hours working together on the series makes them stronger as a team.

The cartoons have been reshared globally, and the Devirs say that they have fans in "basically every country" and that they receive more admiration and recognition outside Israel than within. They have gotten negative feedback from international viewers who were surprised to find out that they are Israeli and have served in the army. However, the Devirs say that they get support from a huge fan base in the Arab world to whom the Israeli part is less important than that the cartoon is about a couple in love. The Devirs say they avoid drawing about politics and religion because, even though they are proud of being Israelis, that is not relevant to the content they create, which is about their relationship.

Their children, daughter Ariel and son Ethan, often appear in the cartoons, and each have their own Instagram accounts with followers; Ariel had almost half a million followers as of 2021. Maya and Yehuda Devir had 9 million followers on social media, including 5.5 million for their main Instagram account, making them the Israelis with the second-most followers in the world, after actress Gal Gadot, and ahead of Prime Minister Benjamin Netanyahu.

=== Publication history ===
The series began in 2016, after the Devirs had both graduated Jerusalem's Bezalel Academy of Arts and Design and were looking for a place to live in Tel Aviv. To make their Instagram and Facebook request for a housing referral stand out, Yehuda drew a one frame cartoon depicting their search. The cartoon got so much follower attention they decided to make it a webcomic series. At first, Yehuda posted an image a month, just throwing it together roughly, for fun, then Maya got involved. She said that since she is going to be in the cartoon, they should invest effort, and the picture should look right. But it was only a hobby; Maya worked as an art director in an advertising agency, and Yehuda worked as a freelance illustrator.

One image from January 2017, titled "My Hot Wife!", depicting Yehuda being burned by a hot shower he was sharing with Maya, was posted by a friend on Hong Kong website 9GAG and went viral. It was shared all around the world on social media and as Internet memes, but often without giving the Devirs credit; the small square black and white logo of Yehuda's face that had been placed in the lower right corner was often cut off. Yehuda says that he wanted to quit drawing the series after that, and to only do commission work, but Maya convinced him to continue, and take the mass theft as a compliment that so many liked the work, and a lesson in how to protect it better on social media. They increased the rate at which they drew the series, and made the logo more central to their works; since then, Yehuda wears a t-shirt with the logo in almost every image, so it can not be cropped out.

In May 2017, the series was featured on Lithuanian website Bored Panda, with others following including the Huffington Post and the IndiaTimes. Yehuda Devir's Instagram account received hundreds of thousands of followers in the next few days. At first, the Devirs thought that Instagram had broken, since their follower count climbed by 10,000 every time they hit "refresh". They reached 1.5 million followers in a week. That month, Maya Devir launched an online store, initially offering autographed prints of their illustrations, which sold well. Maya says the online store is now their daily income; in October 2017 she left her job as an art director to manage that full time. By 2019 the store had expanded into selling three book collections of One of Those Days images, and merchandise imprinted with popular cartoons.

Their comics chronicled their pregnancy in 2018-2019. The couple said that getting pregnant was difficult for them, and they shared their trials through their comics; the image that announced their pregnancy was their first to get over a million likes. Their daughter, Ariel, was born in April 2019, and became an equal part of their series. She brought challenges, including complex emotions, and less time for the parents to devote to themselves, each other, and their business, which the Devirs also shared in their comics. The family moved from Tel Aviv to Kibbutz Beit Alfa, where Maya's parents lived, to help care for the new baby. One popular cartoon addressed the difficulty of leaving baby Ariel with her grandmothers as her parents traveled to shows and lectures.

In 2019, the Devirs gave a TEDx talk on their relationship in Klagenfurt, Austria, in June, and won the Most Creative Content Maker Award at the Inflow Global Summit Awards, an international competition for social media influencers in Istanbul, Turkey, in October. They were listed among 10 groundbreaking Israeli entrepreneurs by TheMarker business newspaper.

In 2020, One of Those Days was published as a book by Random House (10 November 2020, ISBN 978-0-593-23143-2). The 272 page coffee table book included the cartoons from 2016 to 2019, each in a black and white and color version, interspersed with other images from their Instagram. A Hebrew-language book was published in 2020 by Keter Books. A Hungarian language translation (Hungarian: Ez egy ilyen nap, ISBN 9789635974221) was published in December 2022 by Könyvmolyképző Kiadó.

In the spring of 2021, the Devirs, with screenwriter Nir Shenhav, the website DeviantArt, and Wacom (the maker of their graphics tablet), released The Heartists, a five-episode YouTube mini-series about the creation of one of their weekly drawings. The episodes covered the difficulty Yehuda felt after the birth of their first child, their creative process, their teamwork, and finally the drawing itself, the revelation of their pregnancy with their second child.

They used their comics to relate Maya's pregnancy with their third child in 2024, and announce her birth in January 2025.

== Other projects ==
In April 2021, the Devirs launched a drawing course, "The Art of One Frame", through the Class101+ online platform.

In May 2021, the Devirs' illustration of a superhero personifying the Iron Dome air defense system for a tweet by pro-Israel advocacy organization StandWithUs drew backlash which called it propaganda for the Israeli–Palestinian conflict.

In April 2022, the Devirs launched a series of 10,101 artworks sold as NFTs, non-fungible tokens, that they called XOXO. Each image was of a different kissing and embracing couple, vaguely based on the Devirs, with different and sometimes opposite themes, like fire and ice, or prisoner and police officer. The collection includes utility NFTs, that besides the images offer nights at the Selina hospitality chain, meetings with the Devirs, art supplies, courses, or other benefits. 101 of the images were made into a book, XOXO Love Stories, each with an accompanying story about the couple. The work made them pause their regular weekly release of One of Those Days images in December 2021. The first 101 NFT artworks were given away for free, and went in 4 minutes.

Starting in September 2022, animated characters based on the Devirs appear in web and television advertisements for Phoenix Smart of the Phoenix Holdings insurance company. The Devirs created still images from their lives for the campaign, which were then animated by animation house PitchiPoi, with voice over by Dror Keren.

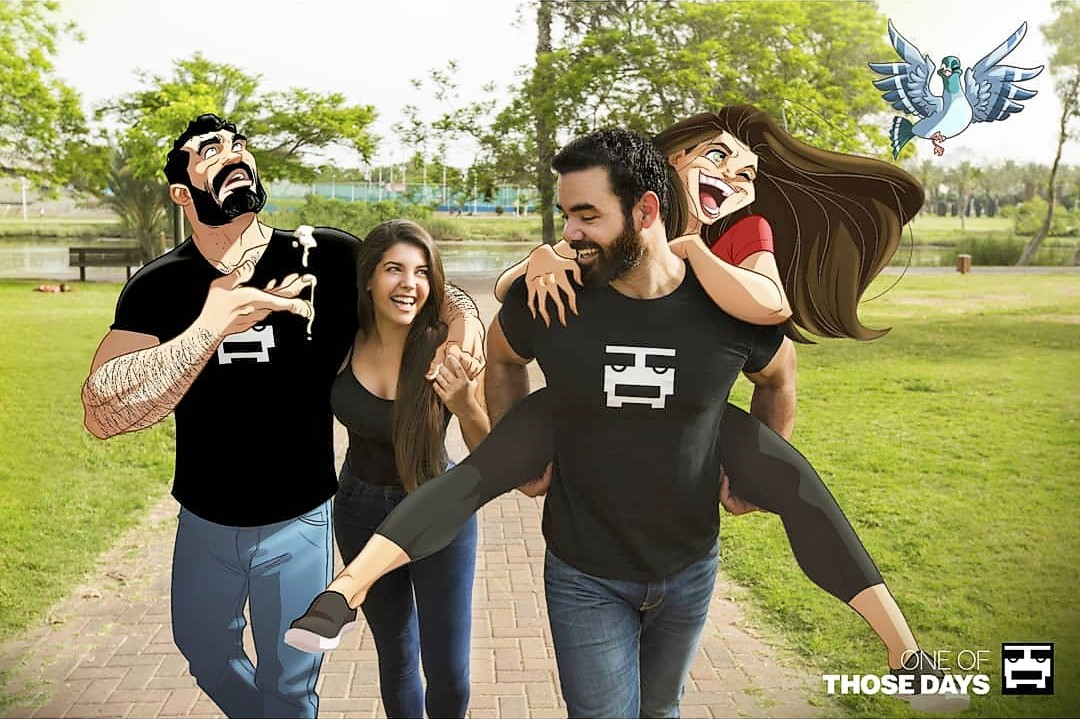
Yehuda and Maya Devir with their cartoon selves in 2018

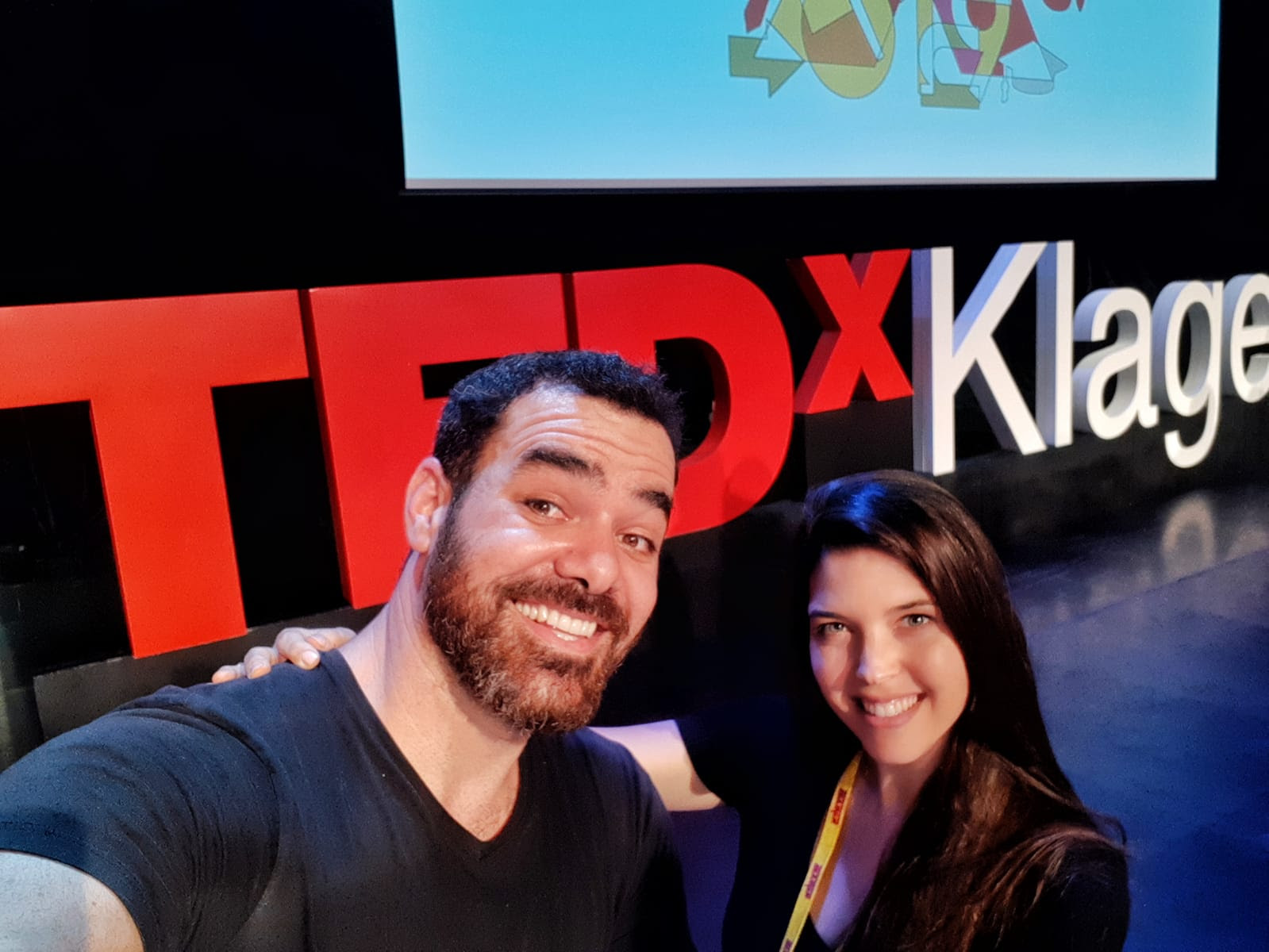
The Devirs at TEDxKlagenfurt in 2019

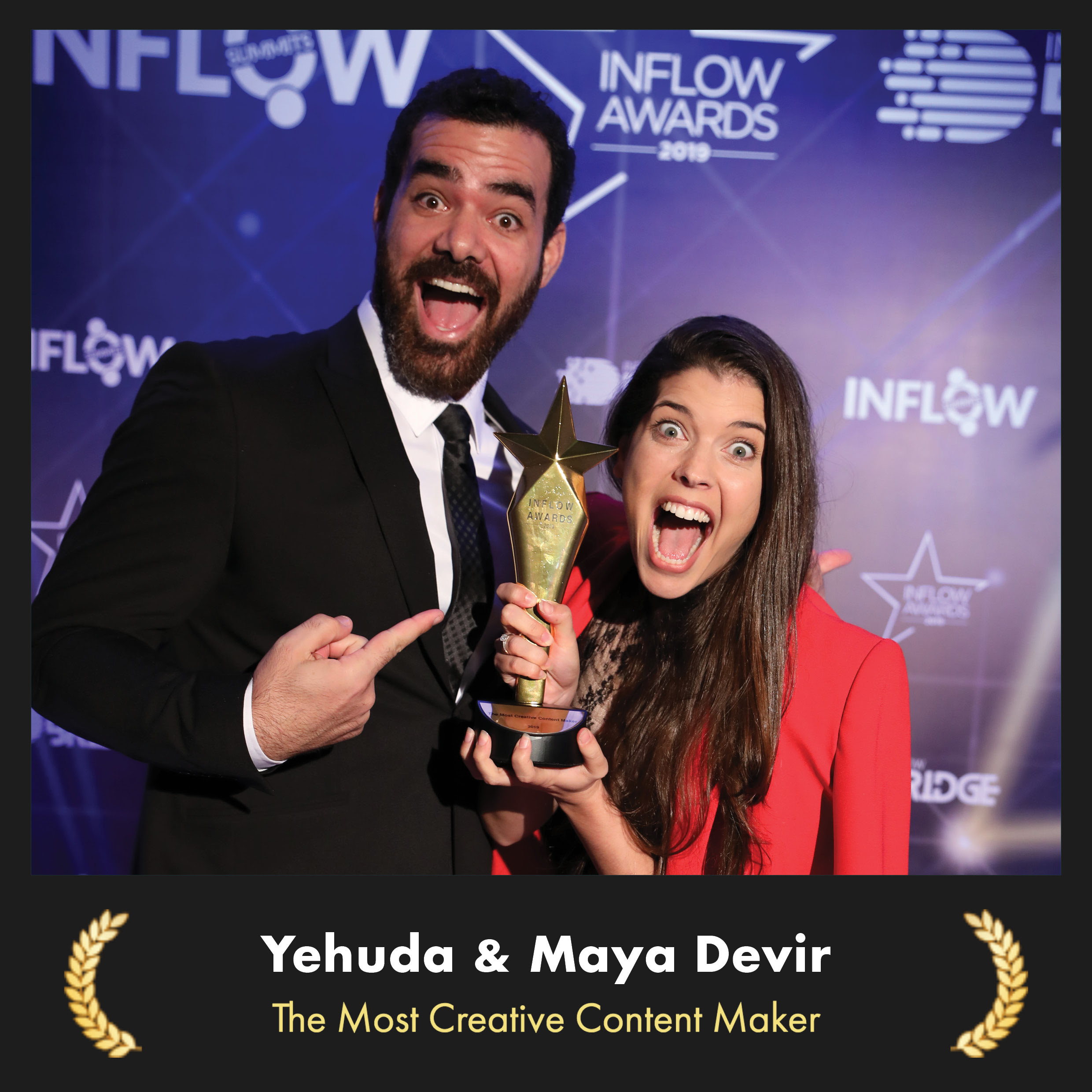
The Devirs at the Inflow awards in 2019
