= Nir David =

Nir David: ניר דוד (Hebrew)
- Kibbutz
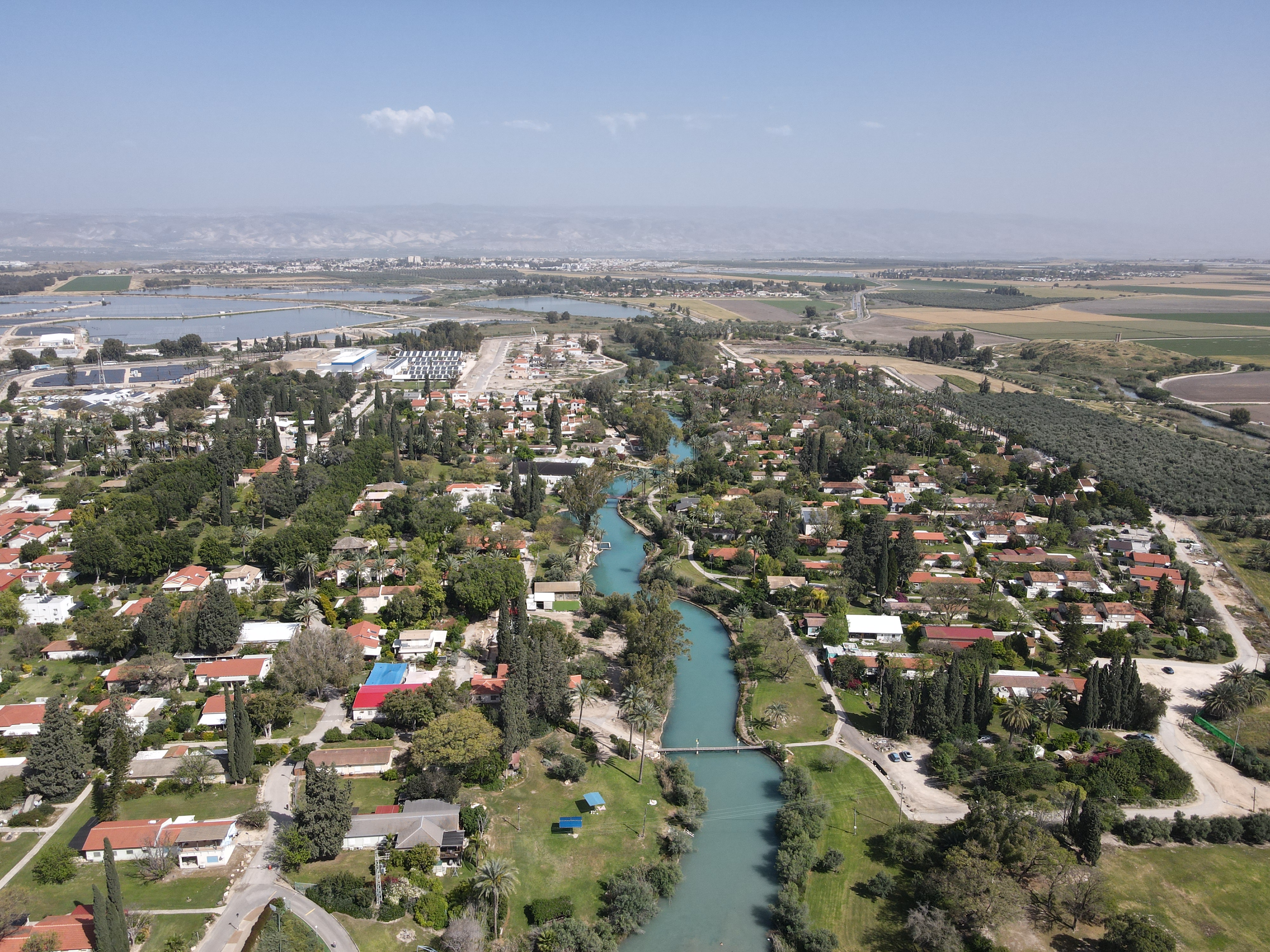
- Etymology: David's Meadow
- Location within Jezreel Valley region of Israel Location within Israel
- Coordinates: 32°30′13″N 35°27′26″E
- Country: Israel
- District: Northern
- Subdistrict: Jezreel
- Council: Valley of Springs
- Affiliation: Kibbutz Movement
- Founded: 10 December 1936; 89 years ago
- Founder: Hashomer Hatzair founders
- Population (2024): 876
- Website: nir-david.org.il

Nir David (Hebrew: ניר דוד, lit. 'David's Meadow') is a kibbutz in northern Israel. Located in the Beit She'an Valley and near the city of Beit She'an, it falls under the jurisdiction of Valley of Springs Regional Council. In 2024 it had a population of 876.

== History ==
Nir David was founded on the 10 December 1936, under the name of Tel Amal. It was established as the first tower and stockade settlement and the first kibbutz in the Beit She'an Valley.

In the 1940s, the kibbutz was renamed Nir David in honor of David Wolffsohn, second president of the World Zionist Organization (WZO). The communal dining room and two children's homes were designed by Zeev Rechter, architect of some of Israel's most iconic buildings. A group of Holocaust survivors joined the kibbutz in the 1940s.

In the 1990s, Nir David developed a tourism industry based around the Amal River, which flows through the middle of it. Around 2010, the kibbutz fenced off the community and installed a locked steel gate at the entrance, after protest from people, who wanted access to the scenic Asi river. In 2021, the kibbutz claimed that 40% of its population was Mizrahi.

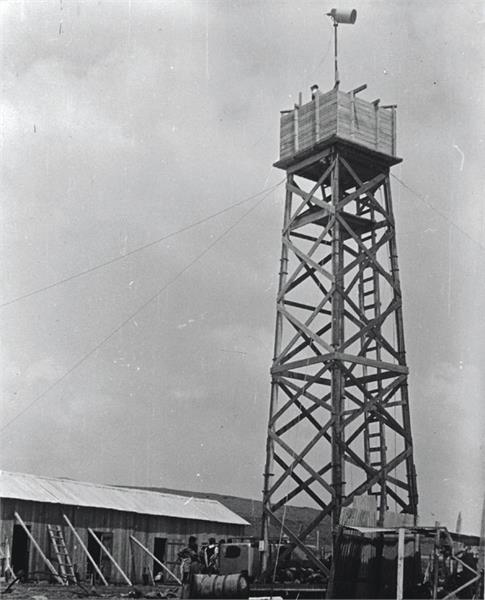
Nir David 1936

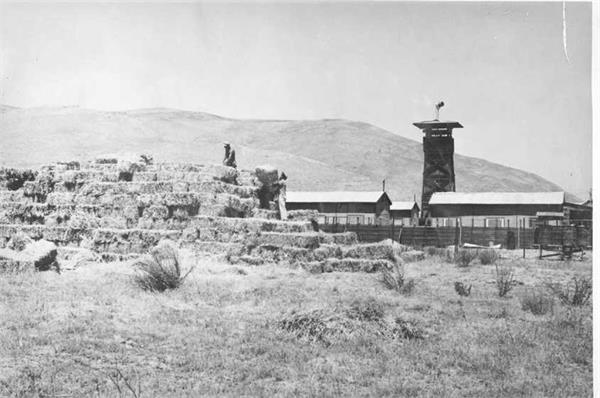
Nir David 1937

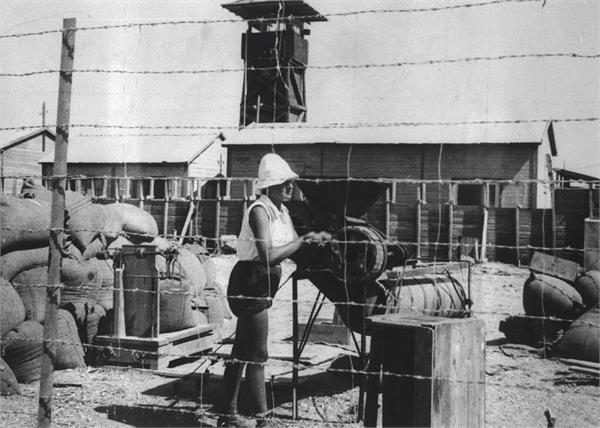
Nir David 1937

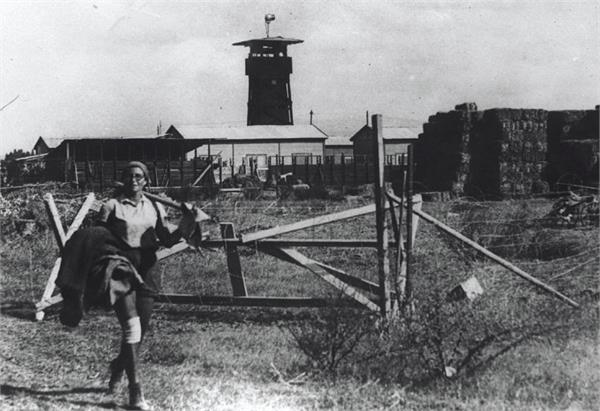
Nir David 1938

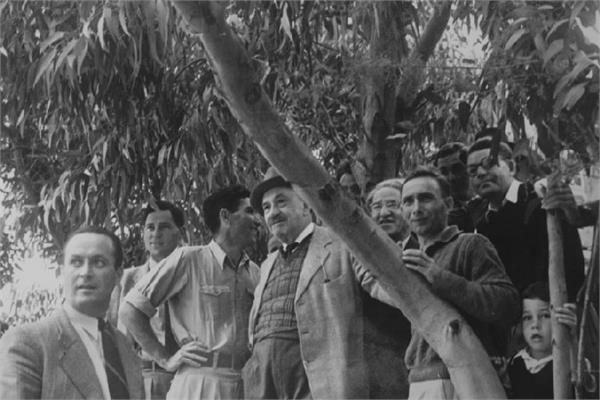
Nir David visit by Chaim Weizmann 1944

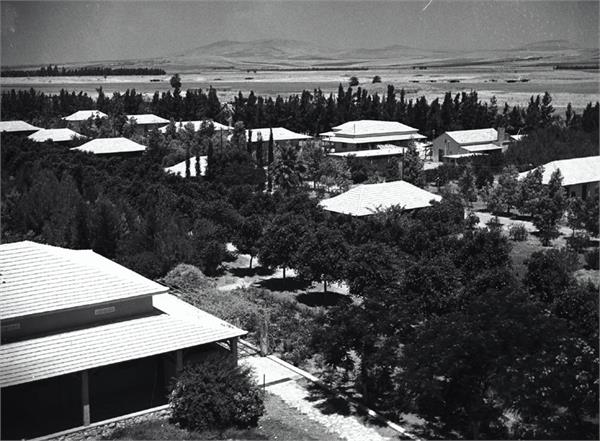
Nir David permanent houses 1945

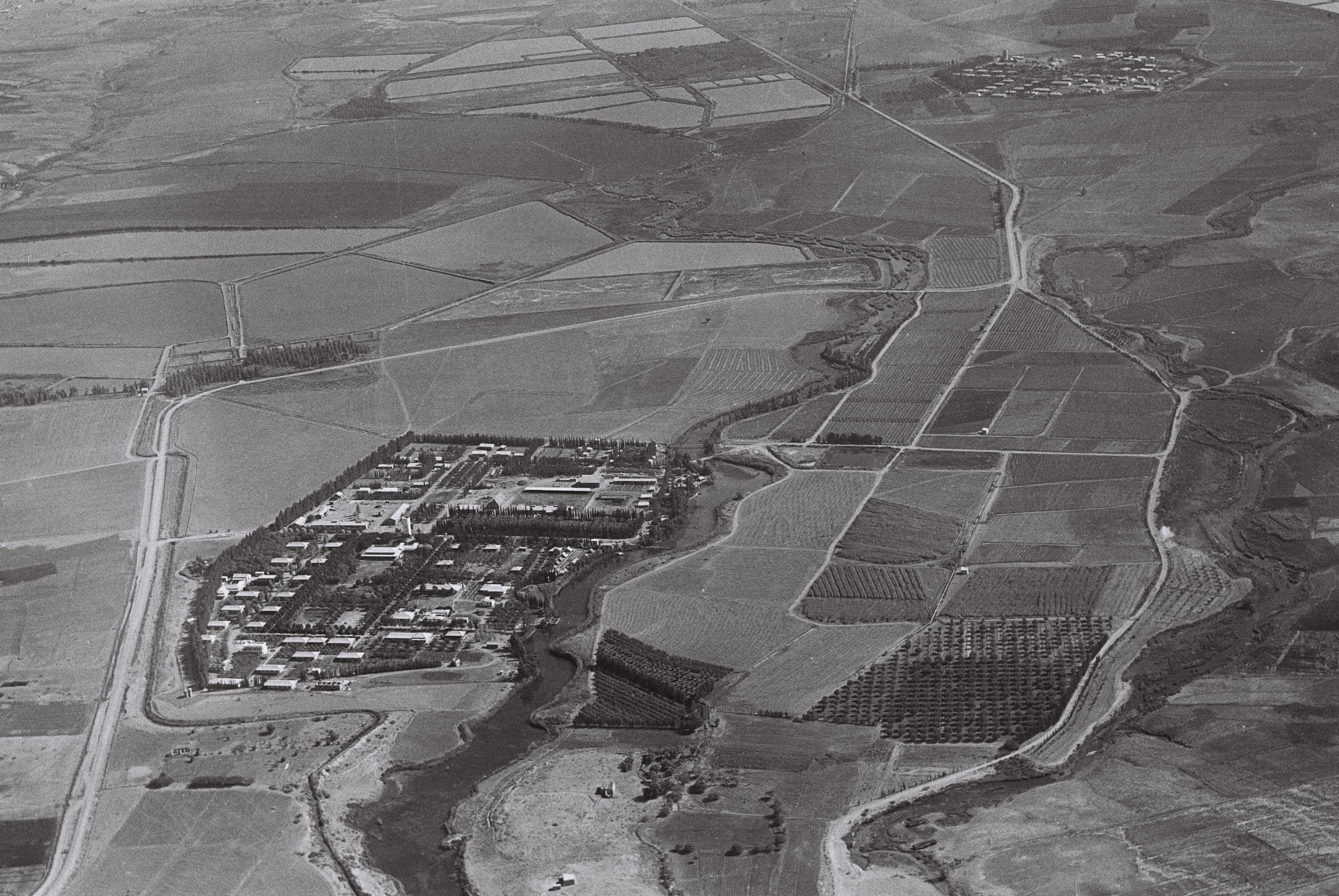
Nir David, 1946

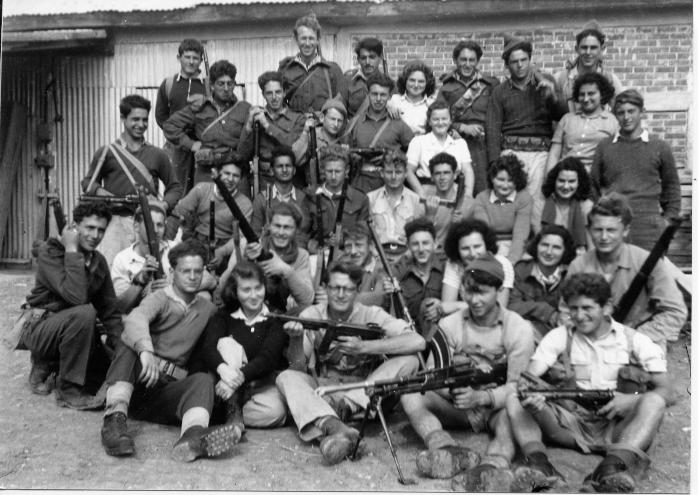
Members of Yiftach Brigade, "C" Company, at Tel Amal, 1948

== Economy ==
The kibbutz's main income is from agriculture, e.g., field crops, orchards, and fish. Nir David Fish Breeding Farms has developed Tilapia strains with unique properties. The kibbutz's "Nirotek" factory produces self adhesive and carbonless copy paper, and a metal factory exports horticultural vehicles and tools.

== Landmarks ==
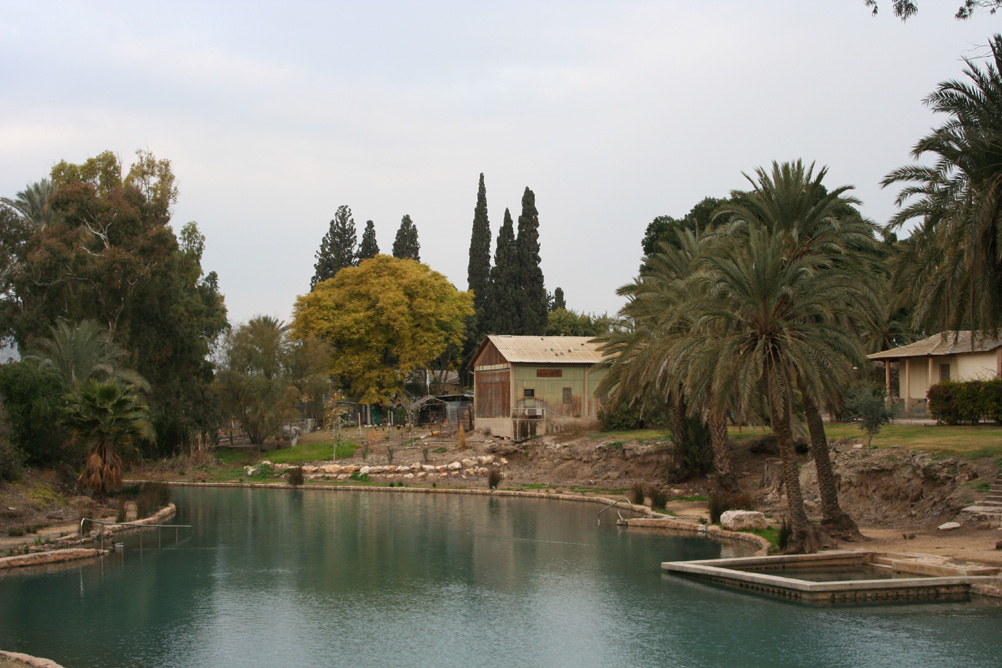
The Asi river

- "Gan Hashlosha" - A semi-natural water park (formerly known by its Arabic name, Sachne).
- Gan Garoo - Australian zoo, which features Australian marsupial wildlife such as kangaroos and koala.
- Village Inn - Lodging in Nir-David on the banks of the Asi river.
- Guest ranch - a relatively large horse ranch offering horseback training for children and adults, from basic riding to competitive, and occasionally hosts equestrian show jumping competitions.
- Holtzer Sport Center - A modern sport complex which includes a 25 m. swimming pool, basketball court and a multipurpose sports auditorium.

== Notable people ==
- Shlomo Gur (1913–2000), founding member of Nir David and first director of Israel's Science Corps.
- Gabi Teichner (born 1945), basketball player
