= Combat (juggling) =

Competitive game played by jugglers

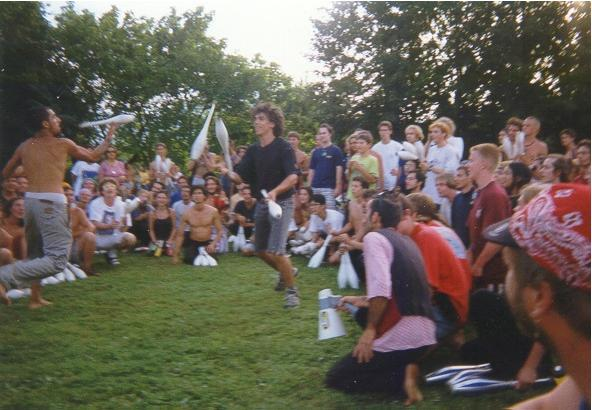
Combat juggling competition

Combat juggling competition in Berlin, 2011

Combat juggling (also known as Gladiator and What the Hell) is a sport and martial art played by two or more players juggling three juggling clubs each. Combat can be played individually against a single opponent (one-on-one combat), between teams of two or more players each, or in a group where everyone plays against everyone. The object of the game is to maintain their own juggling pattern while attempting to make the opponent drop one or more clubs.

== Rules and gameplay ==
=== Basic rules ===
The players start juggling three clubs at the same time. Players are allowed to interfere with other players' patterns in an attempt to make them drop. They should only attack their opponents' clubs, not their opponents' bodies. Anyone who is no longer juggling at least three clubs (because they dropped, collected, or had a club stolen by an opponent) is out of the game. The last person left juggling wins.

=== One-on-one-combat ===
The player who drops will not gain a point while the player who maintains the juggling longer than the opponent and finishes their pattern cleanly, i.e. catches all three clubs without dropping, will. It is a non-contact sport and the object is to attack the clubs instead of the juggler, however, some contact is allowed. Hurting an opponent will be penalized.

=== Group combat ===
In its most typical form, players compete in an open group combat, each attempting to interfere with other players' juggling, with the winner being the last to remain juggling three clubs.

== Competition ==
Competitive combat juggling is moderately popular in Europe and the United States. The most important international competition is the European Juggling Convention and British Juggling Convention Fight Night. The World Juggling Federation organizes the Major League Combat, a team version of combat juggling.

=== Ranking ===
There is an unofficial world ranking that ranks all players who participated in Fight Nights:

- Fight Night Combat Ranking
