= J. Stewart Nagle =

American religious educator (1889–1952)

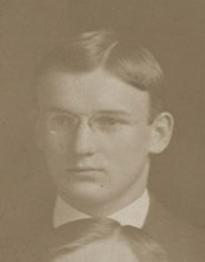
Nagle on his 1907 graduation from the Dickinson College Preparatory School.

James Stewart Nagle (7 March 1889 – 10 April 1952) was an American religious educator and social worker. He came to Singapore in 1914, serving as the headmaster of the Anglo-Chinese School there until 1922. As principal, he established several branch schools and was heavily involved in the organisation of and raising of funds for the ultimately unsuccessful Anglo-Chinese College Project, which would have seen the founding of the first college in Singapore. He was to serve as the college's first president.

After stepping down as principal, he returned to America and became the Director of Religious Education at the Mount Vernon Place Methodist Church in Baltimore. He was later the executive secretary to the American Foundation for the Blind and the China Child Welfare Association, and the assistant director of the National Probation and Parole Association.

== Early life and education ==
Nagle was born in the community of Churchville in Harford County, Maryland on 7 March 1889. He was the son of Florence Livezey and travelling salesman John Henry Nagle, the younger brother of Nagle Packing Company president George A. Nagle. His mother had intended for him to take up missionary work from the start. He claimed to have been stricken with a severe illness when he was nine months old, such that his doctor proclaimed that it would have been "impossible for him to live", though he eventually recovered.

In 1896, he was a student at the Thomas' Run School in Bel Air. He attended the preparatory school at the Conway Hall of Dickinson College in Carlisle, Pennsylvania, graduating and moving on to the college in 1907. He was on Dickinson College's football team, being one of its "most earnest and promising" players. While in college, he served as a junior pastor at the Watersville M. E. Church until 24 January 1909; the cost of his trip there was reportedly "greater than his salary." In January 1910, he was posted to the church's Carollton circuit. He graduated with a Bachelor of Arts degree in 1911. He was then involved in the founding of the Howard Park Methodist Episcopal Church in Baltimore, officially incorporated in August. By 1913, he was the pastor at the Epworth Methodist Episcopal Church.

== Career ==
=== Singapore ===
In mid-1913, Nagle was posted to the Anglo-Chinese School (ACS), an English-medium Methodist school in Singapore, as headmaster. With about 1450 students, it was then reportedly the "largest mission school of Methodism". According to archivist and future ACS principal Earnest Lau, Nagle had likely been appointed to the post with the support of the school's founder William Fitzjames Oldham, who had been in New York raising funds for the Anglo-Chinese College Project. This was to see the school establishing the first college in Singapore. According to Lau, Oldham would have done this hoping for Nagle to "see the project through." The latter left for Singapore on 14 July. He arrived in Singapore and assumed the post by October, succeeding H. B. Mansell.

As principal, Nagle established branches of ACS in Geylang and Paya Lebar, benefiting the local Chinese community in particular. He also took over the Anglo-Tamil School in Serangoon, which he converted into a feeder school to ACS and renamed the Serangoon English School. He acquired the site at Cairnhill, on which yet another branch of ACS would eventually be erected. He had plans for various other expansions of the school which did not come to fruition. Nagle reinstated regular chapel exercises at ACS; these were conducted by him, J. A. Supramaniam and Goh Hood Keng. He initially took a "very great interest in athletics", though he eventually withdrew from this as his workload increased. He then appointed a physical director to succeed him in this capacity. In 1919, he oversaw the introduction of the Grant-Aid system, a reform of teacher salaries at the mission schools, which were previously very lacklustre and unattractive and had led to many of these teachers using the position as a "stepping stone to posts with brighter prospects in the commercial world." The scheme was successful in "stopping the unsatisfactory tutorial situation." Under Nagle's tenure, the school performed well academically. Enrollment in the school continued to increase, and by 1918, it had 2,200 students. Students of ACS under him included bankers Seow Poh Leng and Tan Chin Tuan.

On his assumption of the post of headmaster, Nagle "got to work almost immediately" on the Anglo-Chinese College Project. The year after his arrival, he organised the Post-Cambridge Class which was to take the London Matriculation Examination. This programme was to be the project's "nucleus". In 1917, a committee was formed to investigate the feasibility of the project. The Colonial Secretary and local Department of Education would not allow them to grant degrees as the local government already planned to "inaugurate a system of higher education" themselves, though they were otherwise supportive and students would still be able to "enjoy equal facilities with all others to qualify for any public degrees that might be instituted and equal opportunities for competing for any public awards." Nagle was able to secure $150,000 in donations from prominent local businessmen and philanthropists Lee Choon Guan and Tan Kah Kee, and a third businessman donated a plot of land at Keppel Harbour for the project. Philanthropist Manasseh Meyer had also expressed his intention to support the project. In January 1918, the Straits Echo reported that the college was "in a fair way to becoming an accomplished fact." The newspaper was greatly supportive of this plan, finding that education in Malaya as a whole was "shamefully neglected".

In February 1918, a committee was formed to organise the founding of the college. Nagle was then appointed the council's executive secretary and was to serve as the college's founding president. However, the project was then stalled by a "delay in granting it exemption from registration", as well as Nagle's increasingly divided attention; in addition to being the principal of ACS, he was now also the Superintendent of the Mission for the local Methodist churches and the editor of the Malaysia Message, the organ of the local branch of the Methodist Church. In the years following, the land allocated to the college was instead given to the Jean Hamilton Training School and the newly established Faculty of Theology. With the onset of the Recession of 1920–1921, the college was unable to secure much of the funding that it had been pledged. In this period, he also spent three years as the secretary of education for the Malaysian Annual Conference of the local Methodist Episcopal Church, as well as the secretary of education to the Church's mission schools in the region. He also had plans for the introduction of various amenities for the ACS Old Boys' Association, such as a reading room, though these were later shelved.

It was announced in early June 1922 that Nagle would be retiring to the United States on account of ill health. Preston L. Peach, then the headmaster of the Anglo-Chinese School of Ipoh and the Superintendent of the church's Federated Malay States District, was named Nagle's successor. A farewell was held at ACS on 9 June, three days before he left for America. The vice principal at the time, H. M. Hoisington, proclaimed then that Nagle had "been a great factor in education in Singapore and in Malaya" and hoping that he would return to the school someday, though he also noted that this was not likely given "changes that were taking place in educational matters". With his departure and the government's commitment to establishing the Raffles College, the Anglo-Chinese College Project was officially discontinued in 1925. The teachers who had been brought on for the project went instead to ACS, so the school "did not lose by this".

Tan Cheng Lock later recalled that Raffles College "[owed] its genesis in the first instance to the initiative and effort" of Nagle in his fundraising for the Anglo-Chinese College Project, which "provided the primary and powerful stimulus which ultimately led Government to establish Raffles College." A 1936 report in The Sunday Tribune on the 50th anniversary of ACS's founding noted that Nagle was remembered as one of the school's "outstanding" principals, alongside Oldham, Peach, A. McNab and T. W. Hinch. According to Dji Hian Jap, he was "one of the best-liked" headmasters and educators who had served with the ACS in Singapore and the Methodist Mission in Malaya as a whole.

=== United States ===
After leaving Singapore, Nagle returned to Baltimore and studied at the Post-Graduate School of Johns Hopkins University, graduating with a Doctorate in Education in June 1926. He wrote his thesis on the Educational Needs of the Straits Settlements and Federated Malay State, which was published as a book. He also spent a year at the Mount Vernon Place Methodist Church as the director of religious education. In October 1924, he was appointed the director of religious activities and the financial secretary of the First Methodist Episcopal Church, a position he held for two years. He was the associate minister there by January.

In August 1926, Nagle was appointed the executive secretary of the New York-based board of trustees of the Lingnan University in China. On reporting of his August 1928 preaching of sermons at the Rutherford Methodist Episcopal Church in Rutherford, New Jersey, the Passaic Daily News wrote that Nagle was then "one of the best-known missionaries and welfare workers of the Methodist religion", as well as an "attractive" and "interesting" speaker. By December 1929, he was the executive secretary of the China Child Welfare Association. Nagle had been appointed the field secretary of the American Foundation for the Blind by January 1931. It was in this capacity that he organised talks given by Helen Keller, a trustee of the organisation, at churches. He also engaged in fundraising work for the organisation from time to time, being successful in securing the support of philanthropist Ada Small Moore for the foundation's Talking Book project. He was also a national representative of the International Save the Children Fund in this period.

Nagle was the executive secretary for the Pennsylvania area of the National Council of Christians and Jews in 1939. By then, he had reportedly served as the headmaster of a missionary school in India for several years. In October 1940, he was appointed the secretary of the mid-eastern area of the American Mission to Lepers. Nagle became the assistant director of the National Probation and Parole Association the year after. He advocated for a "uniform system of qualification for probation officers", which he believed was necessary for achieving the "full effectiveness" of probation. He remained in that post until his death. He was on "detached service" with the Baltimore conference of the Methodist Church by 1952.

== Personal life and death ==
On 9 July 1913, days before leaving Baltimore, Nagle married social worker Kathryn M. Thatcher, the sister of composer and organist Howard R. Thatcher, at the Epworth Methodist Episcopal Church. She followed him to Singapore where she also engaged in missionary work for the Methodist church. There, Nagle was a member of the Straits Philosophical Society and of the Straits Branch of the Royal Asiatic Society. He claimed to have been one of about 30 missionaries who aided in the suppression of the 1915 Singapore Mutiny; they had been organising the annual Methodist conference when fighting broke out.

In 1920, Kathryn suffered a "severe attack" of heart disease, and the couple returned briefly to the United States for her to recuperate. She returned with Nagle to the United States in 1922 and was a member of the Mount Vernon Place Methodist Church when he was assistant pastor there. Despite her "physical handicaps", she volunteered with the church's various organisations and engaged in missionary work there. Her health continued to deteriorate over the years, and she again fell ill in the second half of 1934. She died of heart disease at the Maryland General Hospital on 18 December, four months after the illness had returned, and was buried at the Loudon Park Cemetery.

For reasons that remain unclear, Nagle "irritated" Helen Keller and her associates, including Anne Sullivan, who nicknamed him "Jolly Boy" and once "[went] so far as to exact a promise" from Robert B. Irwin, the executive director of the American Foundation for the Blind, that Nagle be "kept away from the Keller household." According to writer Frances A. Koestler, this was despite Nagle generally being "well-liked" and viewed as a "man of earnest, jovial personality". She posited that "any successful fund-raiser weakened Ann's oft-stated conviction that Helen Keller alone could attract substantial support for the Foundation."

Nagle remarried to Alice Berger of Palmerton and Schuylkill Haven, Pennsylvania, formerly a teacher at the Pen Argyl Area High School and the Palmerton Area High School successively, at the chapel of the Methodist Building in Washington, D.C. on 27 February 1937. After this, they went to live in New York City. By 1939, the couple relocated to Schuylkill Haven, where they had a son in November. They also had a daughter. Nagle died suddenly in New York on 10 April 1952. He was survived by his second wife and two children. The funeral was held on 14 April, after which he was buried at the Schuylkill Haven Union Cemetery.

A memorial service was held in Singapore on 10 April at the chapel hall of ACS's Coleman Street premises. The Singapore Standard then noted that Nagle was "reputed to be one of the most popular educationalists in Singapore and a pioneer of higher education in Malaya." A committee headed by Tan Chin Tuan was formed in July to "co-opt, devise ways and means of establishing a suitable memorial" to Nagle. It was decided that a reading room and fountain, to be designed by architect and ACS alumni Ng Keng Siang, was to be erected at the school's premises on Barker Road in Nagle's memory. The Nagle Library was opened on 1 March 1967 by Deputy Prime Minister Toh Chin Chye as part of an extension to the school's premises.
