= Lee Hah Ing =

Singaporean educator (1914–2009)

- Lee in 1960
- Born: 3 August 1914; Ping Hai, Fujian, China
- Died: September 4, 2009 (aged 95); Singapore
- Education: Anglo Chinese School, Sitiawan (1919–?); Anglo-Chinese School, Ipoh (?–1930); Raffles College, Singapore (1930–1934)
- Occupation: Educator
- Years active: 1937–1986
- Children: Four (three sons and one daughter)
- Father: Lee Ko Ding
- Relatives: Nine grandchildren (including Min Lee)

Lee Hah Ing (Chinese: 李学英; pinyin: Lǐxuéyīng; 3 August 1914 – 4 September 2009) was a prominent educator who served as the headmaster of the Anglo-Chinese School (ACS) in Singapore. He began as a schoolteacher at the ACS in Teluk Anson in 1934. He was transferred to the Methodist Boys' School in Kuala Lumpur in 1948, where he remained until 1951 when he was transferred to the ACS in Singapore. He became the principal there in 1961, serving in this post for nine years before leaving to join the training centre of the OCBC Bank.

== Early life and education ==
Lee was born in the village of Ping Hai in the province of Fujian on 3 August 1914. He was the son of Lee Ko Ding, a pioneering Methodist pastor in Malaya. Around 1919, his father was posted to the Pioneer Chinese Methodist Church in the village of Kampong Koh in Sitiawan, Perak, and the family relocated there. He received his early education at the Anglo-Chinese School (ACS), after which he enrolled at the ACS in Ipoh, boarding at Horley Hall. There, he was taught by William Edward Horley, whom he viewed as a major influence. After graduating in 1930, he furthered his education at the Raffles College in Singapore, from which he graduated in 1934 with a Diploma in Arts.

== Career ==
Lee graduated into a severe economic downturn which left him with few employment opportunities. Fortunately for him, the Methodist Church then offered him a position as a teacher at the ACS in Teluk Anson, now Teluk Intan. Following the 1937 overhaul of the school's house system, he was also made the house secretary. By January 1939, he had been elected the president of the school's teachers' union. His last year at Teluk Anson was 1947, being transferred to the Methodist Boys' School in Kuala Lumpur the year after; he remained there until 1951. In that year, he was one of four members of the Pan-Malayan Council of Stamford Clubs sent to negotiate with the government on "salaries, conditions of service and other matters for graduates" for those in the local education service. He was then the council's Selangor representative.

In January 1952, Lee was posted to the ACS in Singapore. However, on his arrival, he was informed that the school did not have any vacant positions, and so he was instead sent to teach at the Geylang Methodist Girls School for two months before returning to ACS as the school's history master. He was also the hockey master. His students in this period included Tan Wah Thong, a future unionist and chairman of the ACS board of governors; Lee was Tan's class master in 1955. He was elected to the committee of the Singapore Graduate Teachers' Association, a trade union.

In December 1960, Bishop Hobart B. Amstutz confirmed that Lee would be assuming the post of principal at ACS on 2 January, succeeding Thio Chan Bee. This coincided with a major expansion in the school's enrollment, which was to increase by about 1,500. As principal, he merged the morning and afternoon classes and expanded the school's pre-university classes. He installed several amenities and facilities at the school, including the Nagle Library, named for former principal J. Stewart Nagle, and the Audio-visual Aid Room. He also oversaw the erection of the Sports Complex at the Barker Road premises, which included an Olympic-sized swimming pool; this was a first for a school in Singapore. He also held the first Fun-O-Rama fundraising carnival at ACS, which continues to be held by the school. These fund fairs helped fund the school upgrading projects. Under him, the school "[set] new records" at the Cambridge examinations. He organised sports events involving Methodist schools in Malaysia. Under his tenure, the hockey team saw success. He also revived the practice of daily devotions.

For his contributions to education in the country, Lee was conferred the Public Service Star by President Yusof Ishak at the 1968 National Day Awards. He decided to retire not long after this; a farewell for him, attended by then-Public Utilities Board chairman Ong Swee Law, was held at ACS on 29 January 1970. Lee was succeeded as the principal of ACS by Chee Keng Lim. In the same month, he joined the OCBC Bank. After a three-month trip to New York and London, during which he observed the training programmes of banks there, he was appointed the principal teaching officer at OCBC Bank's staff training centre on Chulia Street, which had been established the year before. He claimed that he did not wish to "stick to the armchair" in his retirement, though he "really [didn't] know" how long he would stay in the post. He stepped down from OCBC in 1986. On his appearance at a 1989 fashion show fundraiser for ACS, he was described in The Straits Times and The New Paper as "fondly remembered" and "much-loved" as principal.

== Personal life and death ==
Lee was married with four children, three sons and one daughter, and nine grandchildren, including violinist Min Lee. All of his children and grandchildren enrolled in either ACS institutions or the Methodist Girls' School. While in Teluk Anson, he served as an advisor to the Teluk Anson Epworth League and on the committee of the Teluk Anson Chinese Club. On arriving in Singapore, he and his family joined the Wesley Methodist Church. On his appointment as headmaster at ACS, they switched over to the Barker Road Methodist Church. He was successful in convincing alumni of ACS to fund the construction of the church's first sanctuary. This was "unique" for local Methodists. He sat on the Anglo-Chinese School Old Boys' Association from 1961 to 1968, in 1971 and in 1976. He was also briefly a member of the Board of Governors of ACS. He served as the advisor to the Tan Chin Tuan Foundation in 2006. A "keen" sportsman, he played tennis until he was 80.

Around 2004, Lee was diagnosed with prostate cancer. He reportedly "never complained" about his illness as he did not wish to trouble them. By his 95th birthday, Lee was a wheelchair user. He was bedridden in his last two weeks and died of the disease on 5 September 2009.
