= T. W. Hinch =

English educator (1887–1970)

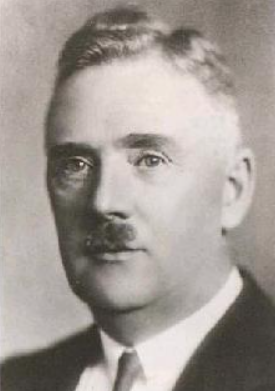
T. W. Hinch as principal of the Anglo-Chinese School.

Thomas William Hinch (23 March 1887 – 11 November 1970) was an English educator active in British Malaya. He served as the headmaster to the Anglo-Chinese School in Ipoh from 1915 to 1920 and the Methodist Boys' School in Kuala Lumpur from 1924 to 1929 before his transfer to Singapore as the principal of the Anglo-Chinese School, remaining in that post for nearly two decades. Popular as principal, he was credited with having contributed significantly to the latter school's success both academically and in athletics.

== Early life and education ==
Hinch was born in the town of Dover in Kent, England on 23 March 1887. He had four sisters and one brother. By 1891, he and his family were residing in Huntingdon, Cambridgeshire. They moved to Cirencester in Gloucestershire by 1901. Hinch studied at the Cirencester Grammar School in the 1900s, taking his London Matriculation Examination there in 1906. He was living on Tewkesbury Road in Bristol by 1906. In December 1907, Hinch successfully took the Teachers' Certificate Exam. He was actively involved with the Wesleyan Methodist Church and the Cirencester Boys' Brigade in this period. He served as a gunner in the Royal Garrison Artillery in World War I.

== Career ==
In the late 1900s, Hinch was employed by the Lewis Lane Council Schools in Cirencester, first as a pupil teacher and then as a certificated assistant master of the boys' department. In this capacity, he "took a great deal of interest in his work" and was an "excellent organiser" of various sportinga activities. He resigned from this post in mid-June 1910, having "secured another appointment." It was revealed later that month that he would be leaving England on 1 July as he was to be posted to the Anglo-Chinese School (ACS) in Ipoh, British Malaya as vice-principal.

=== Ipoh and Kuala Lumpur ===
Hinch began at the ACS in Ipoh in 1910, serving under principal William Edward Horley, and in March 1915 he was appointed the headmaster. Under his tenure, the school was a "model of discipline and organisation." He started a cadet corps and a successful "crack" football team in addition to organising the school's gymnastics and reorganising Sports Day events and game activities. He stepped down in 1918 to serve in World War I as a member of the Indian Army Reserve of Officers and in this period the school was briefly headed again by former principal William Edward Horley before Hinch returned around April 1919. However, Hinch announced in November that he would soon be stepping down to seek a position with a higher salary due to "pressing family liabilities" back home. Hinch stepped down from the post in January 1920, after which he was succeeded by W. L. Matson, who was then forced to depart from the colony soon after assuming the position. It was noted that, with Hinch's departure, the school had "lost an effective educational worker." He was then employed at G. W. Wilson & Co. in Ipoh.

In early 1924, he was appointed the principal of the Methodist Boys' School (MBS) in Kuala Lumpur, succeeding Walter Guy Parker. Parker had initiated the plans for the erection of a new building, though he left Singapore before he could start on fundraising. As such, Hinch was put in charge of raising the funds for the expansion shortly after assuming the post. He initiated an "enthusiastic" campaign for this in September 1925; after 18 months, the effort was declared a success. The new building was completed before Hinch returned to Kuala Lumpur from a holiday, and it was officially opened by the Governor of the Straits Settlements, Sir Hugh Clifford, in December 1927. The building eventually came to be known as the Hinch Annexe.

As principal, he also oversaw the establishment of a scholarship fund, having secured the support of three wealthy local Chinese businessmen. He introduced the one-session system to MBS and took a "keen interest" in the extracurricular activities. He briefly took charge of the Pastorate of the Methodist-Episcopal Church there as W. H. Williams went on leave. In February 1929, it was announced that Hinch was to be transferred to the Anglo-Chinese School in Singapore as headmaster, succeeding A. McNab. His farewell from Kuala Lumpur, held shortly before his departure, was held in March. He was succeeded at MBS by Robert A. Blasdell.

=== Singapore ===
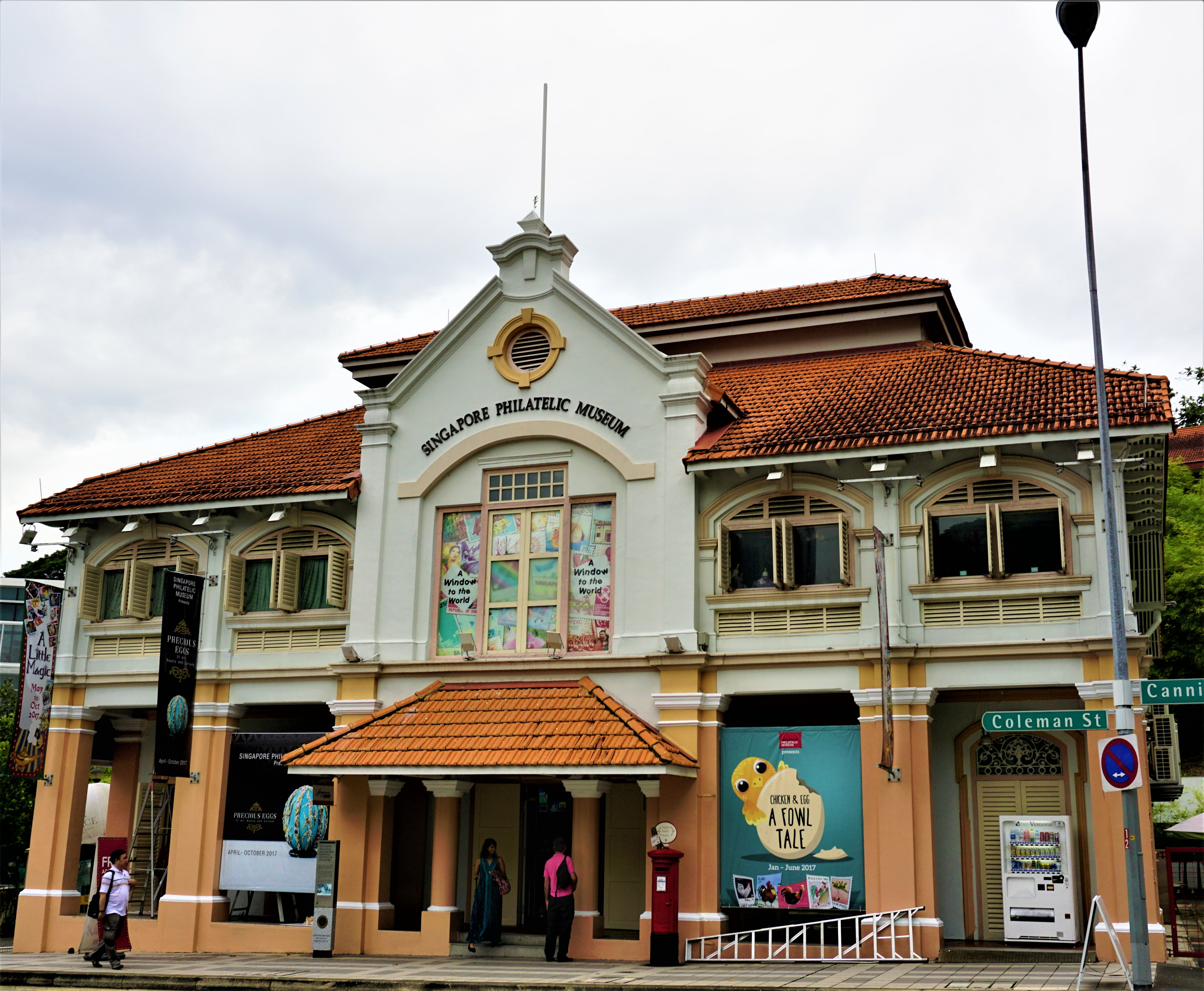
23-B Coleman Street, formerly part of the Coleman Street campus of ACS in Singapore, as the Singapore Philatelic Museum in 2017.

Hinch assumed the post of headmaster at the ACS in Singapore, one of four "leading" boys' schools on the island, on 1 April, becoming the first non-missionary to head the school. His tenure began shortly after the official opening of the school's new building in Cairnhill.

Hinch's tenure as principal was "regarded as an era of consolidation and achievement." The school performed well academically in this period. He revived the school magazine as the ACS Magazine in 1929 and in the year after he introduced the school's house system, which reportedly encouraged participation in school games. He encouraged the formation of various clubs and societies, such as those devoted to geography, history, photography and art, which is credited with having "helped to build the necessary confidence and love for the school." Singing was made a "feature" of the middle school, which by 1936 held Children's Concerts and an annual operetta. He would end his yearly reports with 'The Best is Yet to Be'; this would eventually become the school's motto and would in turn be incorporated into the school crest. Additionally, he cleared the debt the school had incurred through previous extension works. By the time he embarked on his first long leave since he had arrived in Malaya in January 1932 the Pinang Gazette And Straits Chronicle noted that Hinch had "established a reputation as an educationalist".

By May 1933, Hinch was sitting on the board of directors for the Malaya Publishing House. In the same month, he was involved in reviving the Singapore Teachers' Association. He was elected to a preliminary committee which spent the next few months setting up the association. He was elected a vice-president in August. Hinch served as the Educational Secretary to the Methodist Mission Schools in Malaya on several occasions. During the Japanese occupation of Singapore, which lasted from 15 February 1942 to 12 September 1945, lessons at ACS were suspended and its premises were taken over by the Japanese. Hinch was captured and imprisoned. The school eventually reopened after the British returned, and Hinch returned to Singapore to resume as principal of ACS in October 1946, helping the school recover from the occupation. Programmes were introduced to help students who were "handicapped" by the loss of the war years. In November, he began serving on the panel of advisers for The Beacon, published by the Methodist Youth Fellowship in Singapore and Malaya.

In March 1947, Hinch announced that there were plans to move the school to a larger premises. The month after, it was announced that he would be stepping down as principal and retiring to England shortly. He was by then the longest-serving principal of ACS. Thio Chan Bee, a senior master at ACS and a former student of the school under Hinch, acted as principal before Herbert H. Peterson was officially appointed Hinch's successor. Hinch was then conferred the OBE for his contributions to education in Malaya. He was meant to receive the honour in 1941, though this was delayed by the "war confusion". A farewell was held at the school on 11 June, shortly before his departure; this was attended by Patrick McKerron, the Officer Administering the Government. McKerron proclaimed that Hinch had "upheld the best traditions of the teaching profession", crediting him with aiding in the spread of English education throughout Malaya and the "development of Malayan youth in character and leadership." In addition to commending Hinch's work as headmaster and administrator, he claimed that Hinch had established values and "certain standards of character and behaviour" amongst the students, which would "live on as a vital part of the spiritual entity of the school." The school would eventually relocate to larger premises on Barker Road in 1950.

== Personal life and death ==
In Thio's autobiography, Hinch is described as a "kind-hearted though stern-faced Britisher with a moustache like Charlie Chaplin's." On 3 January 1923, Hinch married Gertrude Bean Hinch, an America-born missionary educator who had come to Malaya in 1921, and who would go on to be a prominent member of the Singapore chapter of the YWCA, at the Wesley Methodist Church in Ipoh. The couple resided at 4 Mount Sophia on moving to Singapore. With Gertrude, he had one daughter. As a Methodist, Hinch reportedly held a "deep and rugged faith." He maintained a "lifelong interest" in the work of the British and Foreign Bible Society and sat on its general committee. He occasionally acted as a conductor to the choir of the local Methodist Episcopal Church. Methodist preacher Samuel M. Thevathasan stated in 1934 that while Hinch was not strictly a missionary, he had "actively identified himself" with the mission as the secretary of the mission's local schools, and as such "could be happily counted as a missionary in every sense of the term."

Hinch was involved with the local branch of the YMCA, being elected to its committee in January 1947. He was also an amateur stage actor, appearing in productions of the YMCA Sceneshifters from the mid-1930s onwards, first appearing as Prudence's uncle in the group's Christmas 1935 production of Kenneth Sawyer Goodman's Dust of the Road. He then featured in the September 1937 production of John Drinkwater's Bird in Hand and the November 1938 production of A. A. Milne's The Truth About Blayds. Hinch portrayed Grumio in the staging of Shakespeare's The Taming of the Shrew in September 1939. In July 1938, Hinch was elected to the committee of the Singapore Musical Society.

=== Japanese occupation ===
With the start of the Japanese invasion of Singapore, Hinch began volunteering with the local police force. Shortly after the Fall of Singapore and the beginning of the ensuing Japanese occupation on 15 February 1942, he was captured and interned at the Changi Prison and the Sime Road Camp. His time at camp took a severe toll on his health and he had to deal with illnesses which eventually resulted in him undergoing two operations. Gertrude had evacuated Singapore aboard the HMS Giang Bee just before the fall, but the ship was bombed by the Japanese and she made her way to Muntok by lifeboat, after which she was captured and sent to a camp in Palembang. She remained there for the rest of the occupation, with neither Hinch knowing of the other's survival throughout the occupation, before her release in November 1945, leaving for England before reuniting with Hinch in Singapore. Their daughter had been evacuated to Canada before the fall, and she remained there throughout.

With the return of the British, Hinch was released from the Sime Road Camp. He then contacted Thio, who was by then an "old friend" of his as he wished to "leave the camp early and recuperate in somebody's home." Thio recalled that, on release, Hinch appeared "thin but very cheerful". The former brought Hinch home on a bicycle, and for some time the latter lived in a spare room in Thio's house. He left for England to rest before returning to Singapore in October 1946 to help re-establish ACS, despite not being fully recovered physically. This made him "such a respected figure in Singapore."

=== Retirement, death and legacy ===
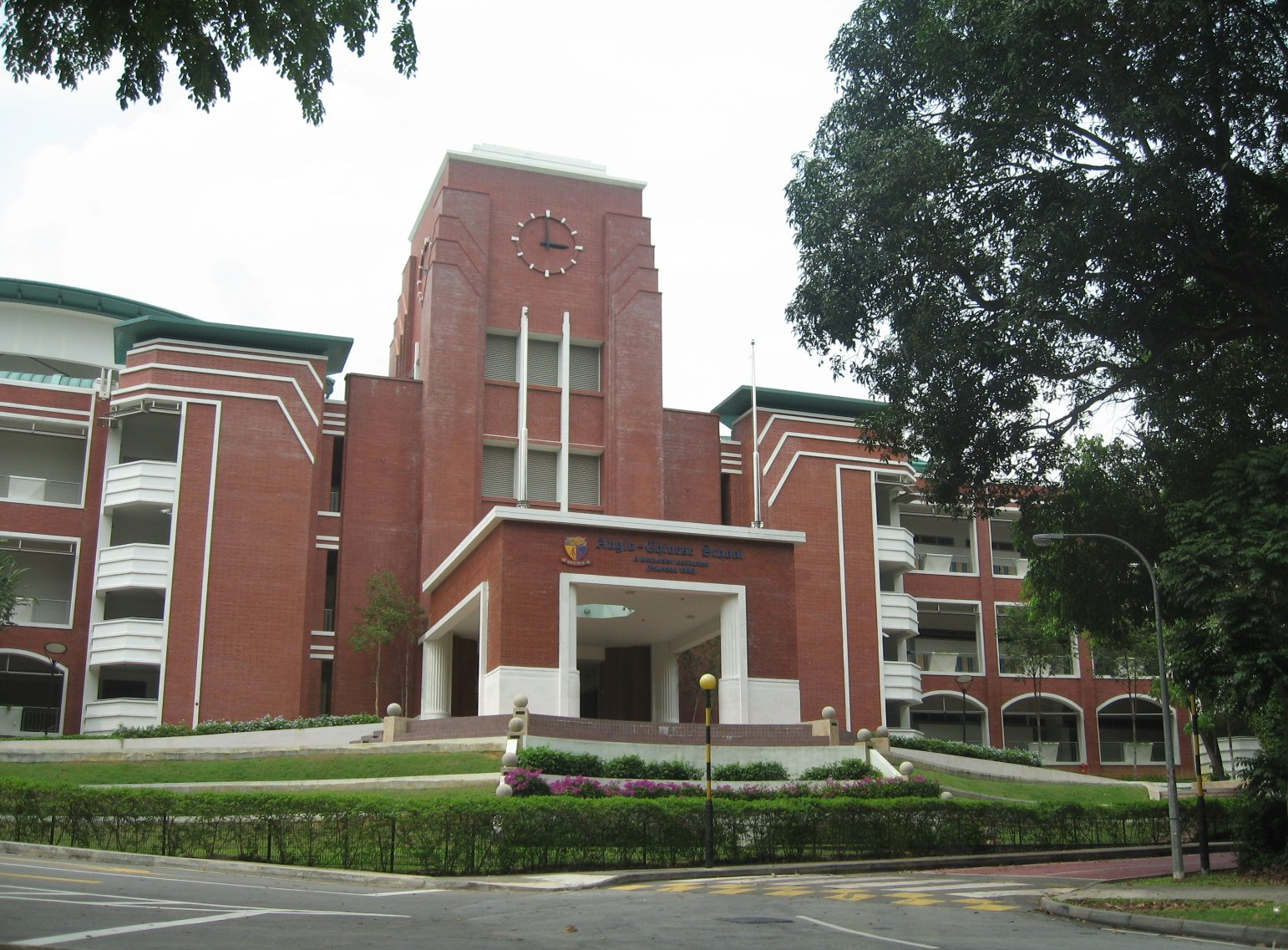
ACS at Barker Road in 2006.

On his retirement, he and Gertrude left Singapore in mid-June to Canada, where they were to reunite with their daughter shortly before her wedding there. After this, they returned to England in mid-March 1948, settling in June on Amherst Avenue, West Ealing in the London Borough of Ealing after several weeks of "frantic" house-hunting. He kept in contact with his acquaintances from Singapore, who frequently visited him while in England. His address book was reportedly "filled with Chinese names." He was reportedly "quiet about his achievements" with fellow members of his congregation in Ealing. Hinch died there on 11 November 1970. The funeral was held on 19 November at the Ealing Broadway Methodist Church, of which he had been a trustee for nearly two decades. His body was then cremated at the Breakspear Crematorium.

In May 1934, the Resident of Perak Henry Wagstaffe Thomson unveiled several tablets at the ACS in Ipoh which recorded the names of nine individuals, including Hinch, who had "given useful and valuable service on the staff and to the mission." On Hinch's retirement, The Straits Times credited him with the school's success in academics and athletics. The Malaya Tribune retrospectively considered his tenure to be "one of consolidation and achievement." His contributions to the school culture are regarded as having paved the way for the eventual expansion relocation to Barker Road. In 1968, the ACS Old Boys' Association began offering a degree course in science or arts at the University of Singapore, named the T. W. Hinch Scholarship in his honour. According to Earnest Lau, a later ACS principal, Hinch was "widely considered the tradition builder of ACS", being successful in his attempts to "[cultivate] a distinctive School tradition".
