= J. A. Supramaniam =

Preacher in British Malaya

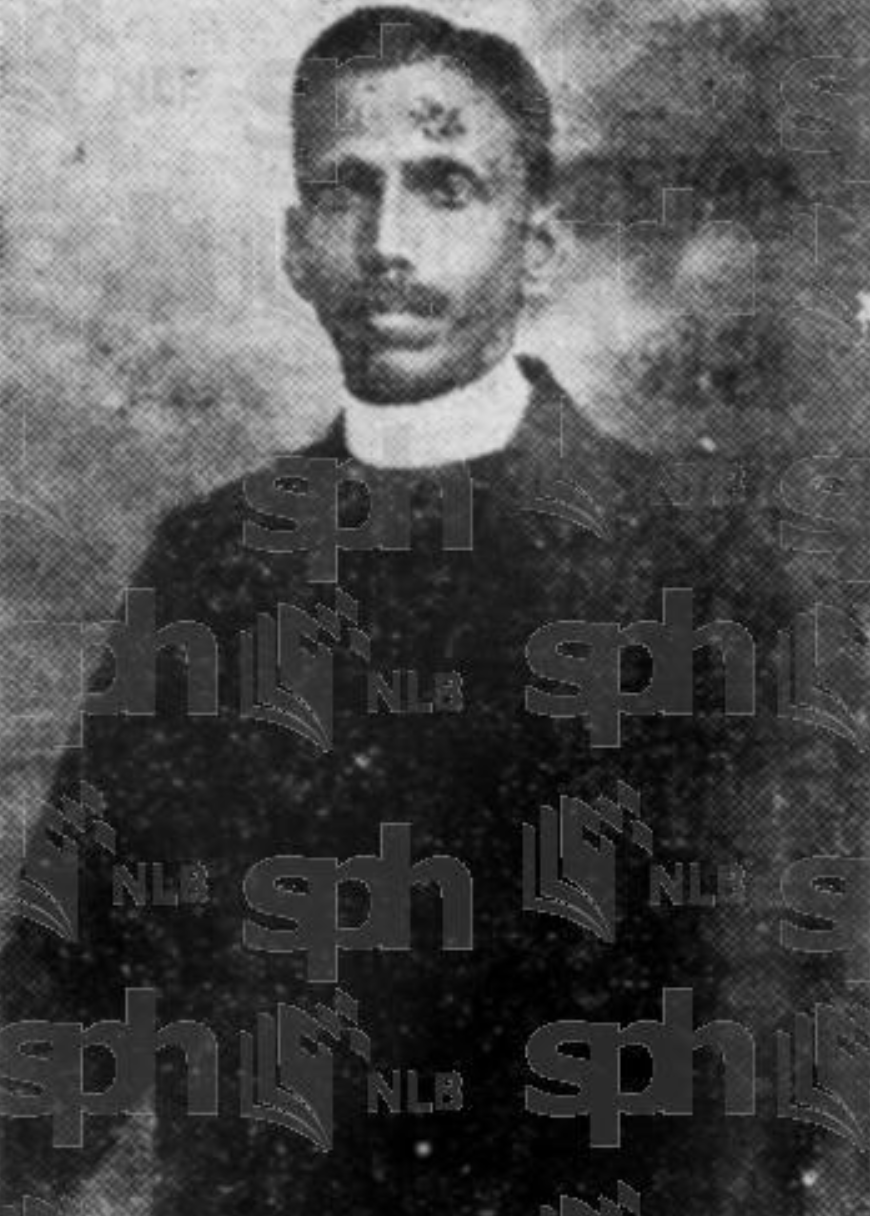
James Arumugam Supramaniam

James Arumugam Supramaniam (1880 — 8 July 1937) was a prominent preacher throughout British Malaya.

== Life ==
Supramaniam was born in Sri Lanka in 1880. He arrived in Singapore in 1892 and began attending the Anglo-Chinese School. While there, he converted to Christianity, and was thus disowned by his family. After he graduated, he returned to the school as a teacher. He and his schoolmate, Goh Hood Keng, were among the first to attend the teacher training courses offered by the government. He and Goh served as both the Sunday School Superintendent and local preacher at the Middle Road Church. He later became a preacher at the Short Street Tamil Methodist Church, and assisted in raising funds for the establishment of a sanctuary on Short Street.

He later became a teacher and a preacher in various parts of British Malaya, including Penang, Kuala Lumpur and Seremban. In 1934, he was appointed the superintendent of the Central Tamil District.

He had a daughter and two sons, including J. M. J. Supramaniam.

He died in Kuala Lumpur on 8 July 1937.
