= Tan Sri Ainuddin Wahid Mosque =

Mosque in Johor Bahru, Johor, Malaysia

- Masjid Tan Sri Ainuddin Wahid
- Location within Johor

Religion
- Affiliation: Islam
- Branch/tradition: Sunni

Location
- Location: Iskandar Puteri, Johor, Malaysia
- Coordinates: 1°31′51.5″N 103°37′22.4″E

Architecture
- Type: mosque
- Completed: 2003
- Minaret: 1

The Tan Sri Ainuddin Wahid Mosque (Malay: Masjid Tan Sri Ainuddin Wahid) is a mosque in Taman Universiti, Skudai, Iskandar Puteri, Johor, Malaysia. The mosque was officially opened on 20 May 2005 by the Tunku Mahkota of Johor at that time, Tunku Ibrahim Ismail Sultan Iskandar and was named after the former Universiti Teknologi Malaysia (UTM) vice-chancellor, Tan Sri Ainuddin Wahid.

== History ==
The mosque was constructed from 2000 and was completed on 31 May 2003.

== Architecture ==
Middle Eastern architecture

== See also ==
- Islam in Malaysia
