= Philip Liau =

Singaporean educator (1920–1993)

- Liau in 1973
- Born: 1920
- Died: September 25, 1993 (aged 72–73); Singapore
- Education: St Andrew's School (1927–1936); Raffles College (1941–1942); University of Malaya (1953)
- Occupations: Educator, civil servant
- Years active: 1948–1981)
- Organization(s): Raffles Institution (1948–1960, 1966–1977); Ministry of Education (1960–1966, 1977–1981)
- Notable work: National Pledge
- Spouse: Evelyn Liau
- Children: Four (two sons and two daughters)
- Awards: Public Administration Medal (Silver)

Philip Liau (1920 – 25 September 1993) was a Singaporean educator and civil servant who served as the headmaster of Raffles Institution. He started teaching there in 1948 and was heavily involved in the production of several plays for the school's drama society, the Raffles Players. After a stint at the Ministry of Education, during which he penned the first draft of the National Pledge, he returned to Raffles Institution and served as its headmaster from 1966 to 1977. He oversaw its relocation to a new campus on Grange Road, which he had a hand in designing.

== Early life and education ==
Liau was born in 1920. From 1927 to 1936, he received his primary and then his secondary education at the St Andrew's School. His classmates there included stockbroker and philanthropist Jacob Ballas and Hugh Lewis, the Registrar of the University of Malaya. He was taught English and Latin by Francis Thomas. He then studied at Raffles College, graduating with honours in 1941 with a Diploma in Arts and returning the year after for a Diploma in Education.

With the onset of the Japanese occupation of Malaya on 8 December 1941, the college premises were requisitioned by the government for use as the headquarters of the Medical Auxiliary Service, for which Liau and several other students and staff volunteered. Alongside future Prime Minister Lee Kuan Yew, he was assigned to the six-person unit led by diplomat and academic Maurice Baker which was to provide medical assistance following an air raid. He graduated from the University of Malaya in 1953 with a Bachelor of Arts degree in English, achieving Second Class Honours — Lower Division.

== Career ==
=== Teacher ===
Liau joined the education service in 1948 and was posted to the Geylang English School, a primary school along Geylang Road. Two months into the job, the superiors deemed him overqualified for the position, being an honours graduate, and he was instead transferred over to the prestigious Raffles Institution (RI). He was elected the editor of the Singapore Graduate Teachers' Association in July 1954. He was also elected to the committee of the newly-formed University of Malaya Society, chaired by K. M. Byrne.

From 1956 to 1958, Liau was the senior literature teacher at RI. In this capacity, he staged four plays for the Raffles Players: Shakespeare's Richard II (1956), James Bridie's Tobias and the Angel (1957), Henry V (1957) and Romeo and Juliet (1958). Liau wished to show his students that the plays "were not incomprehensible or high-flown" and for them to gain an appreciation for the work of Shakespeare. Teachers were previously largely uninvolved in the production of plays. He claimed that the production of Richard II, which played for 12 nights and starred Harry Crabb, drew in audience members from "across the Causeway." Other performers included politician S. Jayakumar and civil servant Kirpa Ram Vij. Jayakumar later recalled that Liau "single-handedly" developed the Raffles Players into a "premier group among secondary schools in Singapore." He claimed that several he and several students had worked overnight at the school to design the sets as they had been "so inspired" by Liau. Philip Smith attributed the quality of Raffles Players productions at the time in general to Liau's efforts.

Liau reportedly persuaded Vij, who had initially planned on enrolling at the Teachers' Training College through the Normal Stream, to further his education at RI and study for the Higher School Certificate examination. Other students of his in this period included architect Albert Hong, National University of Singapore Vice Chancellor Lim Pin, and future Prime Minister Goh Chok Tong, who considered him "as much a friend as a teacher." Goh recounted that Liau "struck [him] as the most urbane and cultured" of his teachers and that he was "at his best" when teaching literature. He would incorporate illustrations into his lessons. Goh claimed that Liau had pushed unsuccessfully for the former to be appointed head prefect.

=== Headmaster ===
Liau briefly acted as the principal of RI in 1960. He was the third of six acting principals the school cycled through from 1959 to 1962. This tumultuous period in the school's history began with Velauthar Ambiavagar's 1959 resignation and ended with E. W. Jesudason's appointment to the role in 1962. He then went to work under the Ministry of Education (MOE) as a textbook advisor. In October 1965, William Cheng, suggested that a National Pledge be produced to "inculcate national consciousness and patriotism in schools." Liau wrote the first draft of the pledge, which was then revised by George G. Thomson, the Director of the Political Study Centre and then by S. Rajaratnam. It was officially published after several more revisions by MOE.

Liau returned to Raffles Institution in 1966 as its headmaster, succeeding Jesudason, who was retiring early. According to educator and historian Eugene Wijeysingha, who was a teacher at RI at the time, Liau proclaimed to the teachers on his appointment that he would "run Raffles Institution with an iron fist in a velvet glove." He felt that Liau was "tough but friendly" and "very pleasant" despite being very strict with students and teachers alike, recalling that he insisted that teacher be on the stage in the hall during morning assembly as he was speaking. He would occasionally ask the senior assistant to speak and check if all of the teachers were present. A year into Wijeysingha's time as teacher, he was informed that he would be transferred to Naval Base Secondary School. On hearing this, Liau went to the ministry and secured Wijeysingha's continued stay at RI.

Liau viewed the development of a "civic and moral conscience" in students as the school's top priority. He claimed in 1970 that he did not believe in caning, finding that any teacher "worth his salt" should be able to discipline without resorting to the cane, and that caning was an admission of one's "own failure to make his pupils respond by other enlightened methods like reasoning or persuasion." However, Wijeysingha recalled that Liau himself was known to cane students, though he opined that Liau had done this in "such a dignified manner."

As principal, Liau oversaw the school's 1972 relocation from its Bras Basah Road premises to Grange Road. Violet Oon noted that Liau worked "very closely" with the project's chief architect, having had the "rare opportunity of being able to specify what he wanted". Liau claimed that government funding only went to the more "austere" aspects of the campus, and that the school paid for anything "not austere". He established a building fund for the school which funded various amenities, including a swimming pool, squash courts, a digital clocktower and a gymnasium. Liau was responsible for placing a lecture theatre on the slope of the grandstand and a cinema above the hall. Oon commented that the school hall and stage "really [had] the feeling of being the pulse-centre of the school", and felt that this must have been the product of Liau's "well-known theatrical taste".

In the early 1970s, despite the school's boys' water polo team performing poorly in competitions, he decided to establish a girls' team, a first for the country. However, despite a "promising start", interest soon declined. Santokh Singh of The Straits Times further credited him and then Victoria Principal T. P. Naidu with "set[ting] the trend" of sending the entire school to support students who were participating in competitions in this period. Singh noted that they "believed in the values of sport and the school spirit that came with it — and their charges did not come off the worse for it."

In January 1976, Liau announced that he would remain as principal for at least one more year before retiring, as he felt that his work at the school was unfinished. He wished to fully pay off the swimming pool, complete another tennis court and upgrade the athletic stadium. It was confirmed in September 1977 that A. K. Sigamoney would be succeeding Liau as principal at the end of the year, and that the latter would continue under the education service in an undisclosed role under the MOE. The school held a farewell ceremony in October. On his retirement, Senior Minister of State for National Development Tan Eng Liang opined that Liau's shift to the Ministry was "RI's loss", but also "education's gain."

Liau was conferred the Public Administration Medal (Silver) at the end of 1977 for his work as principal of RI. In November 1979, he received a meritorious award for his work with the Singapore Schools' Sports Council. Kumar S. of today retrospectively proclaimed Liau a member of RI's "old guard", a series of "great" and "iconic" Asian headmasters stretching from Ambiavagar to Wijeysingha, Sigamoney's successor, who "were unpretentious, transparent and walked their talk".

=== Ministry of Education ===
In December 1977, it was announced that Liau was to head an independent unit of MOE which would be set up the following year. Operating out of the former Alexandra Junior School, it was to run English training courses for teachers with a "below par" grasp of the English language, with university graduate teachers as the instructors. The unit, named the Language Project Centre, had 1,250 students in its first cohort, which was deemed a success. He was transferred to the Singapore Educational Media Service in early 1979 to write the script to a 30-minute-long film as part of a teacher recruitment campaign for MOE. On 22 May, he was appointed a Justice of the Peace. He was then appointed to the local Board of Inspection for places of detention in September. He retired from civil service in 1981.

== Personal life and death ==
Liau was married with four children; two sons and two daughters. His wife, Evelyn Liau, was a banker with the Chung Khiaw Bank who helped raise funds for the relocation of RI through her numerous contacts. His sons included golfer Alvin Liau. The sons were sent to Raffles Institution and the daughters to Raffles Girls' School. His often teased him about how he acted like a teacher at home. The family lived in a bungalow on Kingsmead Road; the house was located next to Chen Wen Hsi's bungalow at 5 Kingsmead Road. He was an artist and contributed a watercolour sketch of Chinatown to the first annual exhibition of the Singapore Art Society, held in March 1950. The Straits Times opined that the work was "very satisfying".

Liau was also an amateur stage actor and set designer. He designed the sets for the Katong Boys' Club Committee's production of Shakespeare's As You Like It, staged at the Victoria Theatre in October 1952. He appeared as the "most virile" senior eunuch in the Singapore Arts Theatre's July 1954 production of Maurice Collis's The Motherly and the Auspicious. R. W. Baxter of The Straits Times was impressed by his performance, finding that Liau "spoke well, moved around with confidence and looked good." He also performed with the Singapore Teachers Repertory.

In his later years, Liau's health declined significantly due to a "nerve problem". He died of bronchopneumonia on 25 September 1993 and was cremated at Mount Vernon the next day. His daughter Suzanne then claimed that Liau was happiest when teaching, and that he should "always be remembered as a teacher."
