= Horley Methodist School, Teluk Intan =

Horley Methodist School
- Sekolah Horley Methodist

Location
- Teluk Intan, Perak; Malaysia
- Coordinates: 4°1′36.59″N 101°1′30.15″E

Information
- School type: Government aided school, National Primary School and National Secondary School
- Motto: Malay: Hidup Berbakti (Live To Serve)
- Denomination: Methodist Church in Malaysia
- Established: 1899
- Founder: Rev. William Edward Horley
- School district: Hilir Perak
- Authority: Ministry of Education (Malaysia)
- Principal: Tan Ying Kee (Secondary)
- Headmaster: Siti Suraini binti Khalid (Primary)
- Grades: Standard 1 - 6 Form 1 - 6
- Gender: Co-educational
- Enrollment: Over 1000
- Campus: Jalan Bandar (Anson Road), Jalan Raja Muda Musa
- Colours: Yellow, Blue & White
- Yearbook: The Ansonian
- Feeder schools: SK Horley Methodist, Teluk Intan
- Affiliations: Methodist Council of Education
- Abbreviation: HMS

Horley Methodist School (Malay: Sekolah Horley Methodist; abbreviated HMS) is a school in Teluk Intan, Perak, Malaysia. Established in 1899 as the Government Tamil School, the school was transferred to the Methodist Episcopal Mission in the following year and was later renamed the Anglo-Chinese School. The school was again renamed Horley Methodist School in 1962.

== History ==
Established originally as a Government school which passed into the control of the Methodist Mission in 1899, due to the efforts of the Reverend W E Horley who was based in Ipoh and had founded the Anglo-Chinese School, Ipoh in 1895. The Teluk Anson school was an attap thatched building on stilts, enclosed with weather boarding of split bamboo.

In 1904, Rev. Horley held a meeting of the leading residents of Teluk Anson in the Lower Perak Chinese Club and collected funds to put up a bigger and better school. In 1913, the new school building was completed and officiated in commemoration of the Coronation of King George V.

The school progressed gradually, and by the 1910 Teluk Anson's conservatism being pushed aside, Indian and Chinese sought admission for their daughters in that school since there was no girls’ school in the town. The school remained a co-educational school; until long afterwards when a ruling by the Senior Inspector of Schools, Perak, in 1938 compelled all the girls to leave and go over to the Convent School.

Secondary education commenced in the school as early as 1922 with a few boys taking the Senior Cambridge Examination. In 1930 the school underwent an extension due to its rapid growth.

When the war came in Malaya in December 1941, the school was looted of all its equipment, and a Japanese garrison occupied it. After the war the school was reopened but there was huge damage caused by the war but the school revived from the help of many ‘good Samaritans”.
