= Ainuddin Abdul Wahid =

Malaysian educationist

Yang Berbahagia Tan Sri Dato' Ainuddin Abdul Wahid PSM SPMJ JMN AMN

1st Vice-Chancellor of the University of Technology Malaysia
- In office 1975–1989
- Preceded by: Office established
- Succeeded by: Muhammad Ridzuan Salleh

Personal details
- Born: 3 November 1929 Teluk Intan, Perak, Federated Malay States, British Malaya (now Malaysia)
- Died: 18 May 2013 (aged 83) Ampang, Selangor, Malaysia
- Resting place: Jalan Ampang Muslim Cemetery, Kuala Lumpur
- Spouse: Rahmah Abdul Hamid
- Education: University of Bristol; Ohio State University

Tan Sri Dato' Ainuddin bin Abdul Wahid (3 November 1929 – 18 May 2013) was a Malaysian educationist and the first inaugural Vice Chancellor of Universiti Teknologi Malaysia (UTM). He made great contributions to educational institutions in Malaysia. In 2000, he received the Anugerah Maal Hijrah 1421H prominent figure award.

== Early education ==
He received his early or lower education at the Teluk Anson (Teluk Intan) Boys Malay School, Perak. Since elementary school, he began to show his interest in engineering, although at that point he did not yet fully understand what the engineering field was. He furthered his studies to the upper secondary level at the Anglo-Chinese School, Ipoh.

Ainuddin graduated with a Bachelor of Science degree in engineering from the University of Bristol, United Kingdom in 1956.

== Universiti Teknologi Malaysia (UTM) ==
Later, in 1969, he transferred from his daily work at Malaysian Public Works Department to the Technical Institute, Kuala Lumpur at the government's request as the institution's Principal.

== Death ==
Tan Sri Ainuddin Wahid died at the age of 83 on 18 May 2013 at his residence in Taman Tunku Abdul Rahman (TAR), Ampang. He was survived by a son and a daughter. His wife, Puan Sri Rahmah Abdul Hamid, died in 1989.

He is buried at Jalan Ampang Muslim Cemetery located at Jalan Ampang near Kuala Lumpur City Centre.

== Awards and recognitions ==
=== Honours of Malaysia ===
- Malaysia
  - Member of the Order of the Defender of the Realm (AMN) (1969)
  - Companion of the Order of the Defender of the Realm (JMN) (1972)
  - Commander of the Order of Loyalty to the Crown of Malaysia (PSM) – Tan Sri (1975)
- Johor
  - Knight Grand Commander of the Order of the Crown of Johor (SPMJ) – Dato' (1978)

=== Places and awards named after him ===
Several places and awards were named after him, including:

- Dewan Tan Sri Ainuddin Wahid, UTM Kuala Lumpur.
- Masjid Jamek Tan Sri Ainuddin Wahid, Taman Universiti, Skudai, Johor Bahru.
- Biasiswa Tan Sri Ainuddin Wahid (Tan Sri Ainuddin Wahid Scholarship).
