= Wahid Omar (vice-chancellor) =

Malaysian civil engineer (born 1962)

Prof. Datuk Ir. Dr. Wahid Omar
- واحد عمر

Vice-Chancellor of the University of Technology Malaysia
- In office 1 September 2013 – 31 August 2020
- Chancellor: Raja Zarith Sofiah
- Preceded by: Zaini Ujang
- Succeeded by: Ahmad Fauzi Ismail

Personal details
- Born: Wahid bin Omar; 27 May 1962 (age 64) Taiping, Perak, Malaysia
- Education: University of Technology Malaysia (DipEng); University of Strathclyde (BSc); University of Surrey (MSc); University of Birmingham (PhD)
- Occupation: Lecturer

Wahid bin Omar (Jawi: واحد بن عمر; born 27 May 1962) is a Malaysian lecturer in structural engineering who served as the 6th Vice-Chancellor of University of Technology Malaysia from 2013 until 2020.

== Early life and education ==
He obtained his Diploma in Engineering (DipEng) (Civil Engineering) from University of Technology Malaysia in 1983, Bachelor of Science (BSc) (Civil Engineering) from the University of Strathclyde, Master of Science (MSc) (Bridge Engineering) from the University of Surrey and Doctor of Philosophy (PhD) (Structural Engineering) from the University of Birmingham.

== Career ==
Prior to his current appointment, he was the Deputy Vice-Chancellor (Development) (2011-2013) and Director, Office of Asset and Development (2008-2011) who was instrumental in managing major development projects of the university. He is a Registered Professional Engineer with the Board of Engineers Malaysia and holds membership in various professional bodies such as the Asian Concrete Forum, the American Concrete Institute (KL Chapter) and . His expertise includes structural assessment, reinforced and pre-stressed concrete, with his latest research endeavour being an investigation on innovative techniques in improving the ductility of high strength concrete. His biggest interest lies in project management and sustainability, and is strongly committed to his vision in transforming UTM into a sustainable campus.

== Honours ==
=== Honours of Malaysia ===
- Malaysia:
  - Commander of the Order of Meritorious Service (PJN) – Datuk (2014)
- Pahang:
  - Knight Companion of the Esteemed Order of the Crown of Pahang (DIMP) – Dato' (1996)
  - Grand Knight of the Order of Sultan Ahmad Shah of Pahang (SSAP) – Dato' Sri (2006)
