= Taman Universiti =

Suburb in Johor Bahru, Johor, Malaysia

Coordinates: 1°32′N 103°37′E

Taman Universiti 大学城
- Neighbourhood of Iskandar Puteri
- Location within Iskandar Malaysia

Government
  - Councillor: Fakhrul Zafran Absl Kamarul (UMNO)

Taman Universiti is a neighbourhood in Iskandar Puteri, Johor Bahru District, Johor, Malaysia, between Skudai and Pulai.

Universiti Teknologi Malaysia (UTM) is a 5-minute drive away from Taman Universiti, hence the name of the town.

Secondary schools include Sekolah Menengah Kebangsaan Taman Universiti.

It is the site of Tan Sri Ainuddin Wahid Mosque.
