= A. K. Sigamoney =

Singaporean educator (1930–2011)

Sigamoney as principal of Raffles Institution.

Asai Kurugula Sigamoney (1930 – 9 November 2011), better known as A. K. Sigamoney, was a Singaporean schoolteacher, educationist and civil servant. After beginning his career as a teacher at Gan Eng Seng School, he became the founding principal of Rangoon Road Secondary School in 1967, serving in this position until 1976. He then served as the headmaster of Raffles Institution from 1978 to 1985.

== Early life and education ==
Sigamoney was born in 1930. He studied physics in Singapore and graduated from the Michigan Technological University in the United States with a Master of Science degree in 1965. His graduate thesis was An Investigation of an Induction-Coupled Argon Plasma at Atmospheric Pressure Using Ultrasonic Probes.

== Career ==
Sigamoney began as a teacher at the Gan Eng Seng School in 1955. He remained there for half a decade before he was transferred to the prestigious Raffles Institution (RI) in 1960. He proved popular with the staff for his "kindness and humility." A physics teacher, he soon became the school's Physics Master. He then succeeded Cheong Pak Lo, who was being transferred to the Ministry of Education (MOE), as the school's Senior Science Master. He became the Senior Assistant of RI by 1962, when E. W. Jesudason was appointed headmaster. On the latter's retirement in 1966, he acted as the principal until Philip Liau was appointed to the post later that year.

=== Rangoon Secondary School ===
In 1967, Sigamoney became the headmaster of the newly founded Rangoon Road Secondary School in 1967. In February 1971, he presented his paper, The Teacher and the School, at the Singapore Teachers' Union Modernisation Seminar. He opined that there were four major problems that "made for poor working conditions" in teaching in Singapore. These were: a lack of communication between principals and teachers on "policy decisions", a language barrier compounded by principals fluent in only one language being put in charge of schools teaching in two language mediums, factionalism and cliques amongst teachers and the heavy workload of teachers. Sigamoney resigned as principal in 1976 and was transferred to MOE as a school science advisor. He opined then that education in the country was underfunded, limiting educational development.

=== Raffles Institution ===
It was announced in September 1977 that Sigamoney was to succeed Liau, who was to retire at the end of the year, as principal of RI. Students recalled that he was caring and approachable in the role. He was conferred the Public Service Medal as a "social and community worker" at the 1979 National Day Awards. As principal, he oversaw the split of the school's pre-university classes into its own institution, Raffles Junior College, in the early 1980s. This was the result of MOE's decision to restrict such classes to junior colleges. Under his leadership, the institution achieved a 100% rate of 3 or more passes at the GCE O-Level examinations for the first time in its history in 1984. This result was again attained the year after. The school's military band and debate team saw success in this period.

Sigamoney was also involved with the Singapore Schools Sports Council, serving on the schools' rugby sub-committee by 1978. He received an award from the council in July 1984 for his contributions to the organisation. He was elected the chairman of the Science Teachers Association of Singapore in April 1980. In 1981, he was appointed to the newly founded Schools Council, established to improve communication between schools and MOE. He served on the council for two years. He and several other members strongly opposed the ministry's proposal for a new type of management committee to be instituted at government schools, called the School Executive Committee. This committee, which was to include one Singapore Armed Forces officer, would have "powers" over schools' budgets and curricula. Sigamoney was one of four principals selected to accompany the MOE on its three-week-long trip to Haifa, Israel as part of its gifted children project.

It was announced in August 1985 that Sigamoney would be retiring from RI at the end of the year, after which he was to be transferred to the MOE. He was to be succeeded on 7 December by Eugene Wijeysingha, a former teacher at the school. A large farewell ceremony was held at RI on 18 October. Kumar S. of today retrospectively proclaimed Sigamoney a member of RI's "old guard", a series of "great" and "iconic" Asian headmasters stretching from Velauthar Ambiavagar, Jesudason's predecessor, to Wijeysingha, who "were unpretentious, transparent and walked their talk".

=== Ministry of Education ===
On his resignation from RI, Sigamoney was appointed the assistant director of MOE's Services Division. He was to help "strengthen" the division, which had been "weakened" on Earnest Lau's resignation. By May 1986, he was instead the ministry's Assistant Director for Pupil Welfare, and continued in this position for around a year. By 1988, Sigamoney was the assistant director for Career and Guidance. He continued to serve in this position until his retirement in 1990. He was conferred the Long Service Award the year after for his work with MOE.

== Personal life and death ==
Sigamoney married fellow educator Ledsumi Sigamoney in December 1961. Ledsumi was the principal of Pasir Panjang Secondary School from 1977 to 1979 and of Crescent Girls' School from 1979 to 1991. She had taught "at least two dozen high flyers" by 1989, including Prime Minister Goh Chok Tong. The couple had one son and one daughter, the latter of whom followed in her parents' footsteps and became a teacher. Their son instead went on to be a cardiologist. Sigamoney was active with the Singapore Scout Association. In March 1978, he was one of several members elected a vice-president of the association's Stamford District branch. He sat on the management committee of the Junior Flying Club.

In his retirement, Sigamoney actively engaged in social and community work, which involved giving talks to students on drug and inhalant abuse as a member of the Singapore Anti-Narcotics Association. A grassroots leader, Sigamoney was elected to the Moulmein Community Centre Management Committee in 1973. He became the chair of the Moulmein Citizens' Consultative Committee in 2000. He organised community events and managed student bursaries. He began volunteering as a marriage celebrant around 1994. He solemnised 78 marriages in 2000.

Sigamoney died of pneumonia on 9 November 2011 at Tan Tock Seng Hospital. The wake was held two days after. RI then established the Sigamoney Leadership Award, to be given to the "best leader from the Year 6 (JC 2) cohort".
