= Methodist Girls' School, Ipoh =

- Sekolah Perempuan Methodist, Ipoh

Location
- Ipoh, Perak 30250; Malaysia
- Coordinates: 4°35′12″N 101°5′6″E

Information
- School type: All-girls Primary and Secondary schools
- Motto: Our Utmost for the Highest
- Religious affiliation: Christian
- Denomination: Methodist Church
- Established: 1895; 131 years ago
- Founder: Reverend William Edward Horley
- Sister school: Anglo Chinese School
- Session: 1
- Principal: Mrs. Lee Bee Ling
- Grades: Standard 1 – 6 Form 1 – 5
- Gender: Female
- Houses: Cavell Red; Crosby Blue; Nightingale Yellow; Victoria Green
- Colours: White and Maroon
- Yearbook: Our Argosy
- Website: ourargosy.blogspot.com

The Methodist Girls' School, Ipoh (Malay: Sekolah Menengah Kebangsaan Perempuan Methodist, Ipoh; abbreviated MGS Ipoh) is an all-girls secondary school in Ipoh, Malaysia. It was founded by the Reverend William Edward Horley in 1895 as the Anglo-Chinese Girls' School.

== Headmistresses ==
- Ms. Grace Towers (Mrs. A. Claessen) [1895 – 1901]
- Mrs. Luering [1902 – 1904]
- Mrs. Rutledge [1906]
- Ms. Ethel Parks [1911]
- Ms. Lydia Urech [1911 – 1915]
- Ms. Carrie C. Kenyon [1916, 1920 – 1927]
- Ms. Minnie L. Rank [1927 – 1932]
- Ms. Thelma Ashley (Mrs. Watson) [1932]
- Ms. Florence Kleinhenn (Mrs. R. A. Kesselring) [1933, 1934, 1936]
- Ms. Thirza E. Bunce [1933 – 1934]
- Ms. Virginia Lake [1935]
- Ms. Gazelle Traeger [1936 – 1941]
- Ms. Edna Dahlin (Mrs. C. Foss) [1941]
- Ms. Daisy Moreira [1945 – 1959]
- Ms. Ann Harder [1960 – 1962]
- Ms. Ruth Ho A.M.N. [1963 – 1971]
- Mdm. Gloriosa Rajendran [1973]
- Ms. Chong Nyuk Mui P.J.K. [1974 – 1988]
- Ms. Yin Kam Yoke P.P.N. [1988 – 1998]
- Mdm. Lily Chin [1998 – 2001]
- Mdm. Lee Ah Kim [2001 – 2004]
- Mdm. Siva Prasanna d/o Krishnan (Mrs. Chandra) [2004 – 2006]
- Mdm. Soot Mooy Ching [2006 – 2011]
- Mdm. Nalini d/o Achuthan Nair [2011 – 2012]
- Datin Mungit Kaur d/o Dalip Singh [2012 – 2015]
- Mdm. Gan Lee Lee [2017 – 2023 ]
- Mdm. Lee Bee Ling [ 2023 – 2026]
