= Earnest Lau =

Singaporean educator (1929–2011)

- 刘笃信
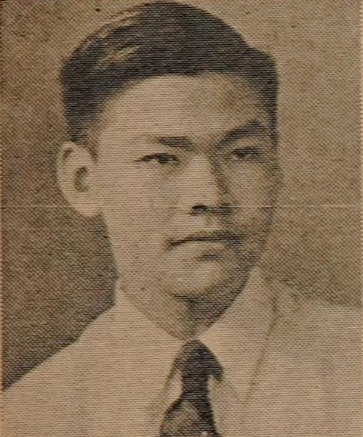
- Lau as a student in 1948.
- Born: 26 March 1929; Singapore, Straits Settlements, British Empire
- Died: 5 March 2011 (aged 81); Singapore
- Education: Anglo-Chinese School (1947); Oberlin College (1948–1954); Balliol College, University of Oxford (1954–1955)
- Years active: 1955–2010
- Spouse: Kwa Geok Lian
- Parents: Edward Sing Lau (father); Lau Soong May (mother)

Earnest Lau (Chinese: 刘笃信; 26 March 1929 – 5 March 2011) was a Singaporean educator, writer and archivist. He began teaching at the Anglo-Chinese School there in 1955, being promoted to the post of senior assistant in 1971 and then to headmaster in 1977, serving in that position until 1983, after which he went to work for the Ministry of Education. Just a year after he had begun working there, he was appointed the director of the Regional Language Centre of the Southeast Asian Ministers of Education Organization, remaining in this post for seven years. He then became the archivist for the Methodist Church in Singapore, authoring several works chronicling its history in that capacity.

== Early life and education ==
Lau was born in Singapore on 26 March 1929. He was the eldest son of the Java-born Methodist pastor Edward Sing Lau and Lau Soong May, the first British Malayan to study at the University of Michigan, and who assisted her husband in his ministry and served as the headmaster of the nearby Geylang Methodist School, an all-girls' school, in addition to her involvement with the Women's Society for Christian Service. Both were educated in Methodist schools in Malaya, with his father having studied at the Anglo-Chinese School (ACS) in Singapore and his mother being a member of one of the earliest batches of students at the Methodist Girls' School in Kuala Lumpur. They had married in the United States and returned as missionaries. He grew up with a younger brother, Philip, who was born a year after him and would go on to become a lawyer.

After a year at the Telok Ayer Chinese Methodist Church, his father was posted to the newly established Geylang Methodist Church, and the family then relocated to a "very modest" bungalow on Aljunied Road, a more isolated area within the then-largely rural Geylang. As working as a pastor did not pay, his father served as the headmaster of the Anglo-Chinese Continuation School. He was also involved with the Methodist Book Room. An aunt from his mother's side in Kuala Lumpur came to live with them and began working as a teacher at the school. Despite them being boys, his mother sent Lau and his brother to the school she headed, where they were the only two boys of the roughly 300 students there. He believed that she had done so as there were no other schools for boys nearby and any route to town would involve him and his brother travelling on their own. After just one year, they were transferred to the ACS on Coleman Street, where he continued his primary education and then had his secondary education until the beginning of the Japanese invasion of Malaya in December 1941. Their father sent them for private Chinese lessons after school.

=== World War II and further studies ===
With the beginning of the invasion, the Lau family were forced to evacuate their bungalow as it was part of a compound which had been requisitioned by the British army, alongside the nearby school and church. They relocated to Benefit Road. When the Japanese occupied Singapore, the schools were shuttered. The primary school section was eventually reopened by the Japanese at the former San Shan School at 107A Sophia Road, who appointed Lau's father to act as the headmaster of what was then known as the Sophia Road Boys' School. Lau was taught Japanese in this period, and after one year of schooling in the occupation, he was employed by two Japanese firms as an insurance agent and clerk. Following the end of the occupation in September 1945, the family returned to Geylang.

The schools were eventually reopened by the British, and Lau completed his secondary studies at an accelerated pace due to the lost time, taking the Cambridge examinations after two years and graduating from ACS with a First Class Certificate in 1947. He was then the pianist and choir director at his father's congregation in Geylang and the chair of the Singapore and Malaya chapter of the Wold Friendship of the Methodist Youth Fellowship in this period, being a particularly active member of the fellowship's Geylang chapter.

Lau had initially intended to continue his studies in China, though he and his family came to view this as unviable due to the political situation there. Instead, they decided on the United States, and his parents asked their acquaintances to give them recommendations. Oberlin College in Oberlin, Ohio was suggested, and Lau left Singapore in August 1948 to study Arts and Music there for six years, beginning on 16 September. In December 1948, he performed in a production of Dorothy Clarke Wilson's White Christmas, a missionary play "based on a theme of inter-racial brotherhood", staged at the Epworth United Methodist Church in Marion, Ohio. Methodist missionary and future Bishop Hobart Amstutz claimed in 1953 that Lau's "presence and upright bearing" had "cleared the suspicions of Asians, particularly the Chinese, in the American community in which he was staying."

After graduating, he applied to several institutions in the United Kingdom, as a British degree offered far more opportunities than an American degree in Singapore. He was accepted to the Downing College at the University of Cambridge and the Balliol College at the University of Oxford, choosing the latter as he felt that it was more renowned. There, he studied for a Bachelor of Arts in History degree and his Diploma in Education. He had by then already decided on following in his parents' footsteps and becoming an educator. For his diploma, he was engaged at Berkhamsted School as a 'practice teacher' in 1955.

== Career ==
=== ACS ===
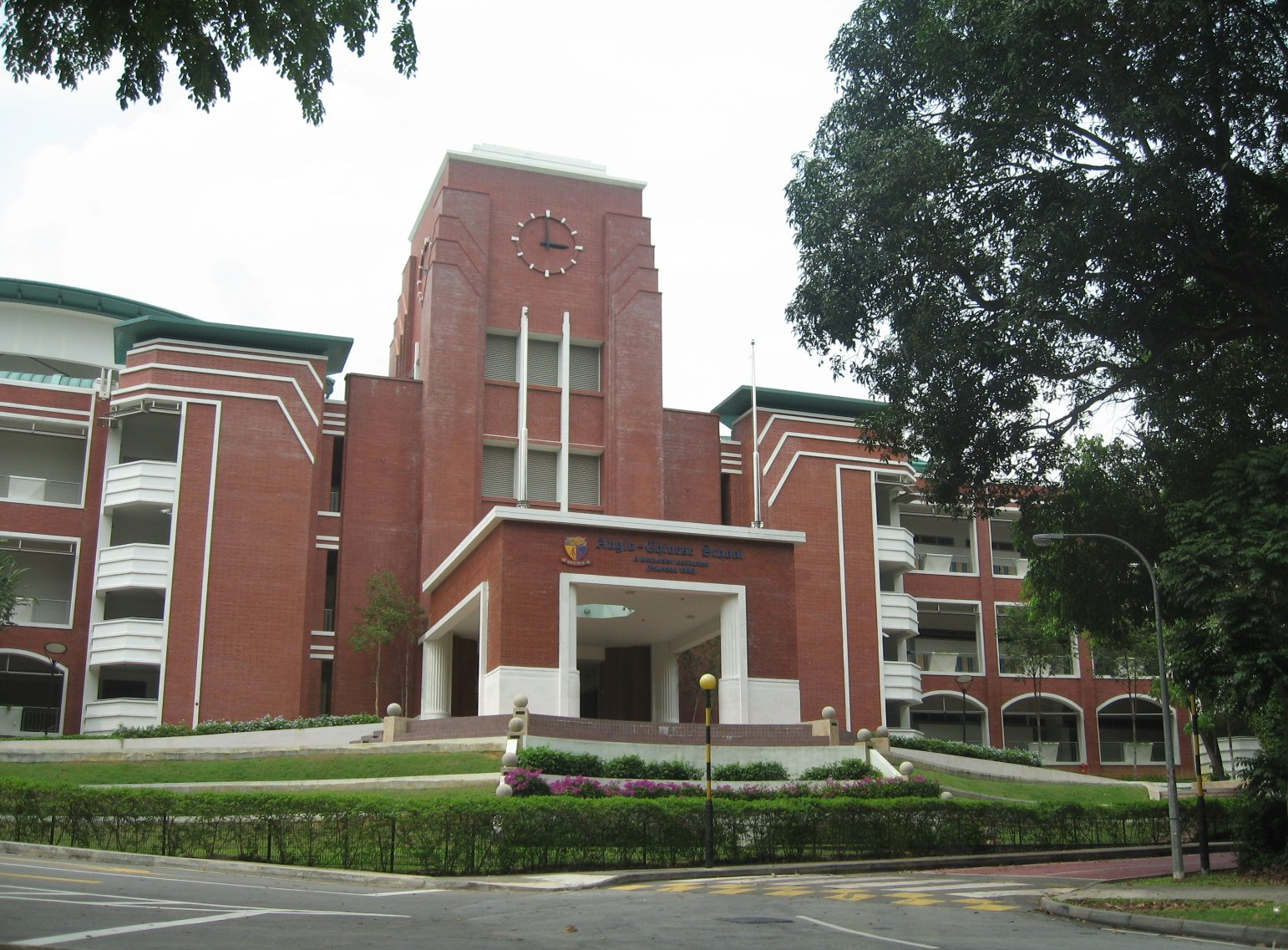
ACS at Barker Road in 2006. The school had relocated here from Coleman Street and Cairnhill Road by Lau's return in 1955.

After graduating from Oxford, Lau returned to Singapore in late August 1955 and began as a teacher at the local ACS. His father had requested that the principal offer Lau a position at the school. As a young teacher, he was "bullied" by his colleagues who "forced [him] to do a lot of things that they themselves didn't want to do." As such, he had to teach several subjects he had not been trained in, such as bible knowledge and literature, as well as extracurricular activity work that "nobody wanted". He was put in charge of the rugby team, which then included future diplomat Winston Choo, as well as the camera club. He was also made a housemaster and helped establish the Janus Club among the pre-University classes. He taught English History for two years before it was taken off the syllabus. After this, he taught history and English. Students of his in this period include remisier Yap Swee Hoo and businessman Rafiq Jumabhoy.

In the mid-1950s, Lau and a few colleagues joined the Singapore Graduate Teachers' Association, a union which he felt was "neither here nor there". The association merged with the Singapore Teachers' Union in 1960, and this union threatened to take collective action, though Lau was opposed to this as he did not wish for the students' education to be harmed. He and most, if not all, of the teachers at ACS withdrew from the union afterwards. They were later asked to rejoin, though Lau declined, believing that the union offered little benefit to him. In 1957, he was invited to serve as a Primary School Leaving Examination setter for the Ministry of Education (MOE). He then served as the coordinator for the history subject for around a decade. In the 1960s, he served as the Administrative Secretary of the Commission on Christian Education of the Methodist Church. He became the senior assistant for the afternoon or continuation school at ACS in 1971, though this did not come with a pay rise. He was put in charge of the afternoon school.

In January 1977, Lau was selected to succeed ACS principal Chee Keng Lim, who was to be transferred to the Anglo-Chinese Junior College (ACJC), which comprised the pre-University classes which had just been split from ACS, as headmaster. He had previously applied to be the head of the junior college, though he was not successful. He was forced to deal with the school's shortage of teachers and set the school's dress code. In 1980, he and Chee oversaw then Minister for Education Goh Keng Swee's attempt at introducing his controversial "anti-snobbery" campaign in both schools. Lau felt that ACS had been unfairly singled out in this respect, and that snobbery was "difficult" to control and define. In 1981, he was appointed to the newly established Schools Council, serving on it for three terms and chairing the South Zone Schools' Council. According to The Straits Times, he "could usually be counted on to provide some laughs" at council meetings. He successfully obtained approval for the construction of a hostel for foreign students of ACS and ACJC at the start of 1982. As principal, he was viewed as "stern and formidable" and a "very hard taskmaster".

Real estate agent Tan Tee Khoon, who was a student of ACS under Lau's tenure as principal, recalled that despite the latter's "austere appearance and strict disciplinarian approach", he was also a "discerning and dedicated educator who sought his students' total well-being", and heavily supported their character development. Other students of ACS in this period swimmers Ang Peng Siong and David Lim, the latter of whom credited Lau with giving him a "clear path to follow" regarding discipline. Politician Vivian Balakrishnan, also a student in this time, considered Lau a "'major presence' in his school life".

In late 1983, Lau suddenly announced to the school's staff at a meeting that he would no longer be the principal of ACS. He later recalled that the ACS Board of Governors had sent him a letter stating that he would "no longer be required for the school" as principal, though he was "welcome" to remain at the school as a teacher. The letter did not give any reason for this, and Lau did not ask for any, though he did not understand why this decision had been made, especially as his relationship with the board had been "satisfactory". As this would have been a "shameful thing to tell his teachers", he did not reveal this to any of the staff, instead announcing that he would be retiring. His official farewell dinner, attended by over 200 former students of his, was held at the Pavilian Intercontinental Hotel on 7 April. After he had been asked to step down, the Board of Governors struggled to find a replacement for him, and the senior assistant then continued to act as the headmaster for a year before British educator William Thomas of Raffles Junior College was named Lau's successor. Lau later came to be viewed as one of the school's "legendary" principals and a "rough diamond" who "[told] you as it [was]".

=== MOE, RELC and archival work ===
On learning of the ACS Board of Governors' decision, Lau informed the Senior Minister that he would be "available" from 1 January 1984. As he was viewed positively within the MOE for his work with the Schools' Council, he was asked to report to the MOE on 2 January. Due to this, which he viewed as a "watershed in which [he] then had a chance to have a different kind of work", Lau eventually came to view his firing from ACS as a "blessing in disguise". He was one of 12 former principals to join the MOE in that year, being promoted to the ministry's newly established Senior Education Service. After leaving ACS, Lau was appointed the assistant director with the Ministry of Education's Supplementary Material Authorisation department, in charge of vetting textbooks and distributing the funds allocated for the upgrading of school libraries. He was also put in charge of coordinating the education display at the 25th Anniversary Exhibition, held at the World Trade Centre in December.

In January 1985, it was reported that Lau had been tipped to succeed Tai Yulin as the director of the Regional Language Centre (RELC) of the Southeast Asian Ministers of Education Organization (SEAMEO). RELC's governing board then noted that while Lau was being considered for the role, he had yet to be officially nominated by then. Lau was appointed to the role the following month by the Southeast Asian Ministers of Education Council at its meeting in Manila. His former department at the Ministry of Education was "weakened" by his departure and he was succeeded there by Raffles Institution headmaster A. K. Sigamoney in December. When he took over, the centre was not profitable, worsened by the poor performance of its hotel, which was in need of an upgrade and suffering from low occupancy due to a "hotel slump" in the country. Lau stepped down from the RELC in the Summer of 1992.

Lau became the archivist for the Methodist Church in Singapore the year after resigning from RELC; he succeeded Bishop Theodore R. Doraisamy, who had died the year before, and he continued to hold this post until his death. In January 2003, he renamed the archives the Archives and History Library just as it was relocated to the newly built Methodist Centre on Barker Road. He was the head of the church's Family Service Centre, which aimed to help people "cope with latchkey children, slow learners, senior citizens, and others who may need help." In 1995, he was also appointed the founding principal of the newly established St. Francis Methodist School, a private school of the church established to cater towards drop-outs. He continued to serve in that post until he was succeeded in 2003 by Lenie Cho. In August 1997, he and several other members of the church were approached by Bishop Wong Kiam Thau, who wished to revive the church's organ, the Methodist Message. He was given a column, A Page From the Past, which became popular with readers. He wrote "simply but clearly" and "kept to his deadlines." He was appointed the outfit's associate editor in February 1998.

In 2000, Lau began work on The ACS Story, a coffee table book which aimed to be a "fairly comprehensive summary of the evolution of the ACS in its 117 years of history". The book, which he wrote and edited, was published by the ACS Board of Governors in 2003 on 1 March, the school's founders' day. contributed the biographical entries on Sophia Blackmore and Theodore R. Doraisamy, both prominent figures in the history of Methodism in Singapore, in A Dictionary of Asian Christianity, published by W.B. Eerdmans in 2001. He authored From Mission to Church: The Evolution of The Methodist Church in Singapore and Malaysia: 1885-1976, published by local independent publisher Armour Publishing in 2008. Pastor Chiang Ming Shun felt that the book "should be recommended reading for all Methodists." He then wrote a commemorative pamphlet for the 125th anniversary of Methodism in Singapore in 2010.

== Personal life and death ==
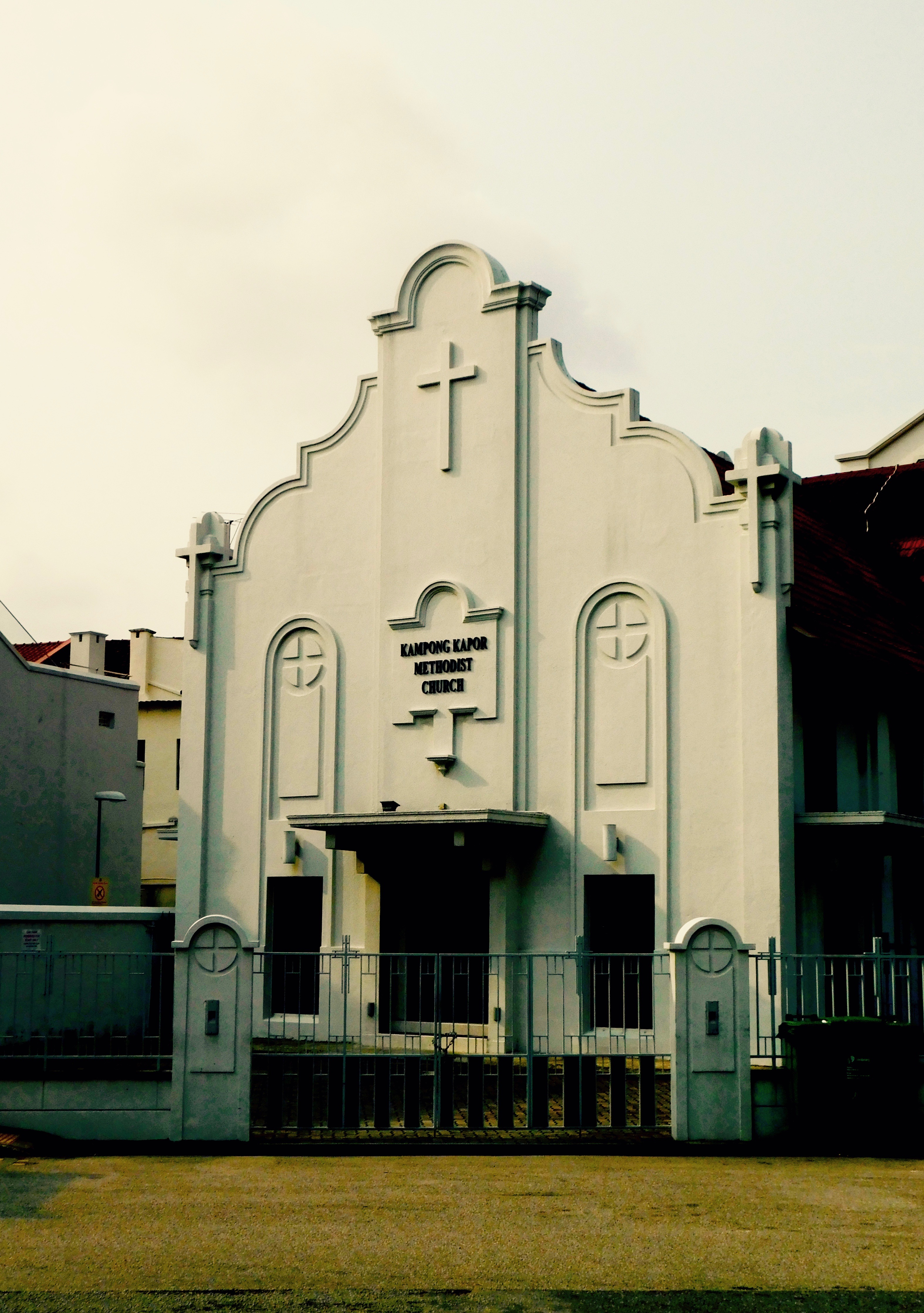
The Kampong Kapor Methodist Church in 2018.

On 29 December 1956, Lau married Kwa Geok Lian, also known as Mrs. Earnest Lau, a fellow educator who served as the headmaster of the Anglo-Chinese School (Junior). Kwa was the sister of Kwa Geok Choo, a lawyer who was the wife of the first Prime Minister of Singapore Lee Kuan Yew, Kwa Geok Lan, the wife of politician Yong Nyuk Lin, and civil servants Kwa Soon Bee and Kwa Soon Chuan. Through Kwa Geok Choo, Lau was the uncle by marriage of the third Prime Minister of Singapore Lee Hsien Loong, who remembered him as a "dedicated tutor who taught him discipline, attention to detail and how to express himself well", as well as the director of the National Neuroscience Institute Lee Wei Ling and businessman Lee Hsien Yang. He would give the siblings tuition lessons, assigning Lee Hsien Loong English essays and comprehension passages, "ever so gently" reminding him to improve on his "untidy" handwriting, and tutoring Lee Wei Ling in the General Paper subject on Wednesday afternoons.

He and Geok Lian had no children, and the latter died of cancer far before he did. The couple owned and lived in two adjacent single-storey bungalows at 15 and 15A Camden Road within the Camden Park Good Class Bungalow district. He spoke in a "clipped Oxford" accent. A staunch Methodist, Lau had been elected the vice-president of the local annual Methodist conference by 1977. He was later involved with the Kampong Kapor Methodist Church, which his father had transferred to in the early 1950s. He was later a bible study group leader there and grew close with several fellow members of the congregation. Lau was appointed the head of its finance commission and later became the chair of the church's executive committee, a position he held until his death. His last act in this capacity was to open its extension on Jalan Besar. The pastor-in-charge Kang Ho Soon claimed that he was the "epitome of a servant leader and committed and generous until his last days". Bishop Robert M. Solomon noted that he was a "legendary figure" in the local Methodist community. Former students of his established the Earnest Lau Chair of Systematic Theology chair at the Trinity Theological College in his honour in 2002.

Lau died of heart failure while taking a nap at home on 5 March 2011. He had been recovering from a pacemaker implant and his health had been failing for some time by then. The wake was held the next day at the Singapore Casket. Speakers at the wake included Lee Hsien Loong, Lee Wei Ling, Vivian Balakrishnan and Kang Ho Soon, and the attendees also included Lee Hsien Loong's wife Ho Ching and remaining sibling Lee Hsien Yang. The funeral was held at the Kampong Kapor Methodist Church on 8 March, after which he was cremated at the Mandai Crematorium. In his obituary in The Straits Times, he was described as one of the country's "most respected educators." On his death, he bequeathed the Camden Road properties to the Kampong Kapor Methodist Church. The church put the properties up for sale by tender in March 2016 with the expectation that they would then be redeveloped.
