= J. M. J. Supramaniam =

Singaporean doctor and first Chairman of the Singapore Medical Research Council

- Born: James Mark Jeyasebasingam Supramaniam; 13 October 1921; Kuala Lumpur, Selangor, Federated Malay States
- Died: 11 December 2008 (aged 87)
- Education: King Edward VII College of Medicine, Singapore University of Edinburgh University of Glasgow University of Wales (Cardiff)
- Spouse: Eunice Princess Jebaranee Aiyathurai (m. 1955)
- Parent(s): James Arumugam Supramaniam (father); Harriet Navamany Joseph (mother)

James Mark Jeyasebasingam Supramaniam (13 October 1921 - 11 December 2008) was a doctor, public administrator, research clinician and the first Chairman of the Singapore Medical Research Council, WHO Fellow, and acknowledged world expert on tuberculosis, with Sir John Crofton and Wallace Fox.

Supramaniam played an important part in the elimination of tuberculosis in Singapore, and is sometimes called the 'Father of Tuberculosis' there. He established aviation medicine in Singapore and was founding chairman of the Singapore Medical Aviation Board.

He was deputy permanent secretary of health in Singapore from 1971-1981.

Supramaniam was a WHO advisor and provided technical assistance for newly established medical services in African countries and Taiwan in the 1960s.

== Early life ==
Supramaniam was a direct descendent of the Arya Charavarty Dynasty which ruled the Jaffna Kingdom from the late 1100s until the Jaffna crown was annexed into the Kingdom of Portugal in 1624. His father was Reverend James Arumugam Supramaniam, a Methodist minister.

== Education ==
Supramaniam studied at Anglo-Chinese School in Singapore and Methodist Boys School in Kuala Lumpur, Malaysia. He was the top student in the Senior Cambridge Examinations and enrolled in the King Edward VII College of Medicine in Singapore in 1940.

Supramaniam graduated on 1 March 1951 and began his medical career at Tan Tock Seng Hospital.

== Medical Practice ==
In 1971, whilst concurrently running Tan Tock Seng Hospital, Supramaniam was also concurrently appointed as Deputy Director of Medical Services of Singapore, placing him in charge of the entire hospital services nationally.

Supramaniam was founding chairman of the Singapore Medical Research Council and the Civil Aviation Medical Board of Singapore.

== Personal life ==
Supramaniam has an elder brother, George Supramaniam, who was a house surgeon. His elder brother helped British POWs at Batu Lintang Camp in Kuching and died of beri beri during the Japanese Occupation in 1944.

In 1955, Supramaniam married Eunice Princess Jebaranee Aiyathurai, daughter of physician to Sultan Ibrahim, in Ceylon, India.

Supramaniam moved in 1990 to Kent, England to spend time with his children and grandchildren.

== Awards and honours ==
Supramaniam was awarded Pingat Pentadbiran Awam (Emas) (Public Administration Medal Gold) by the Government of Singapore in 1974. He was elected a Fellow of the Academy of Medicine in Singapore, an Emeritus Fellow of the American College of Chest Physicians, a Fellow of the Royal College of Physicians of Edinburgh and LAO Royal College of Physicians and Surgeons of Glasgow.

The story of Supramaniam's life was chronicled in the book He Saved Thousands, the publication of which was sponsored by the National Heritage Board and supported by the Prime Minister's Office during Singapore's Bicentennial in 2019. The book was launched by the President of Singapore, Tony Tan, and Coordinating Minister Khaw Boon Wan, and attended also by the Heath Minister, the Singapore Minister for Law and Home Affairs, the former Foreign Minister and representatives of 22 countries.
