= Wesley Methodist Church, Ipoh =

Church building in Ipoh, Malaysia

Coordinates: 4°35′29″N 101°04′09″E

Wesley Methodist Church
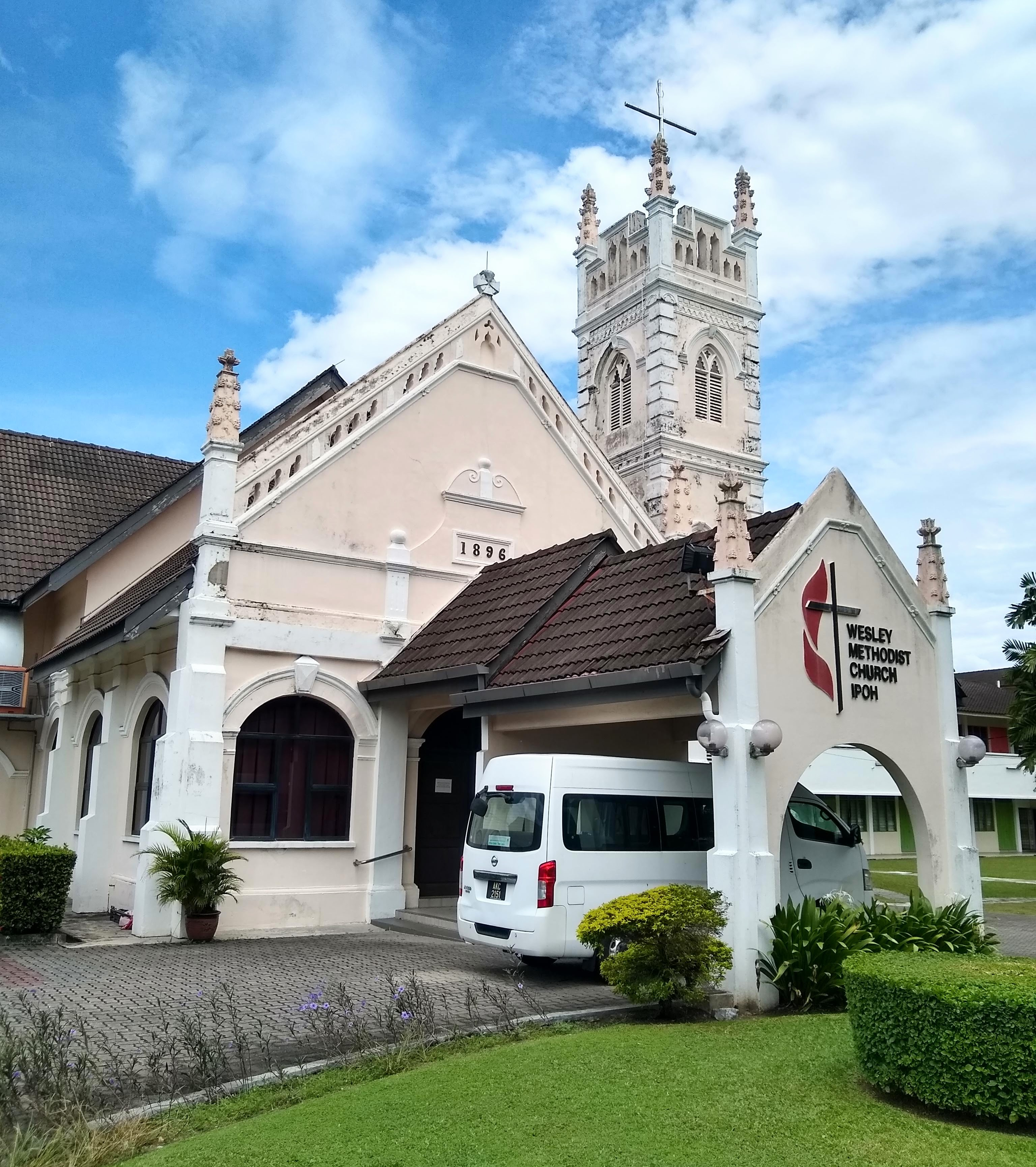
- Wesley Methodist Church
- Address: 121 Jalan Lahat, Ipoh, Malaysia
- Denomination: Methodist
- Website: https://ipohwesley.wordpress.com/

History
- Status: Active
- Founded: 1894
- Founder: Rev William Edward Horley
- Dedicated: 3 May 1896

Architecture
- Architectural type: Gothic
- Years built: 1895–96
- Completed: February 1896

Clergy
- Pastor: Rev. Teoh Lee Yng

Wesley Methodist Church is a Methodist church in Ipoh, Malaysia. Founded in 1894, it is the oldest Methodist church in Peninsular Malaysia.

== History ==
Wesley Methodist Church, Ipoh, the oldest Methodist church in Malaya when it was founded, with the exception of the island of Penang, traces its origins back to 1894 when Rev William Edward Horley took over as head of the Methodist mission in Ipoh from Rev Tinsly William Stagg who had established the mission earlier that year but had retired due to ill health. Horley, tasked with building a school and a church, acquired a piece of land from the government and constructed a two-storey wooden building in 1895 which served as both a school and a church, which he named "Horley Hall".

With the aid of local donations, Horley began construction of a new church of brick adjacent to the original wooden building in 1895, which was completed within six months, and formally opened at a ceremony on 3 May 1896. The earliest congregation consisted of members of the English speaking community. In the following years, the church underwent various alterations including the addition of two wings and a church hall in the 1950s.

On the 23 February 1992, a fire destroyed the church leaving only sections of the skeletal framework. After fund raising, it was rebuilt to match the original design and at the same time further buildings were added at the site including offices, a library, music room, conference rooms, a wake and chapel, and living quarters, all of which were completed in time for the church's centenary celebrations in 1996.

== See also ==
- Methodist Church in Malaysia
