= E. W. Jesudason =

Singaporean educator (1913–1982)

Jesudason in 1963.

Edward Wilson Jesudason (27 February 1913 – 31 August 1982), better known as simply E. W. Jesudason, was a Singaporean educator who served as the headmaster of Bartley Secondary School from 1955 to 1962 and Raffles Institution from 1962 to 1966. He is best remembered for guiding the latter institution through a tumultuous period and penning the lyrics to its school anthem, in addition to the various programmes he instituted in both schools.

== Early life and education ==
Jesudason was born in Seremban in the state of Negeri Sembilan on 27 February 1913. He had two sisters and one brother. In 1930, he began attending Raffles College in Singapore on a government scholarship, graduating in 1933 with a diploma in arts. At Raffles College, he stayed at the same hostel as Methodist bishop Theodore R. Doraisamy.

== Career ==
After graduating, he left for Taiping, Perak in 1933. Having graduated into a severe economic downturn, he accepted an offer to teach at the Government English School at Batu Gajah for $20 a month, then considered "half-pay". He arrived there on 15 May and was put in charge of a Primary One class, where he "could do the least damage". There, he started the school magazine, the first issue of which was negatively received by the headmaster for criticisms it had made. He was later asked to write in simple English as opposed to "Raffles College English".

In January 1936, Jesudason was transferred to the King Edward VII School in Taiping, where life was "a little easier" for him. When the British teachers left for volunteer training due to "rumours of an impending war", he and the other local teachers took over the Cambridge classes, which he claimed resulted in improved results. He taught English and literature to seniors there. He and the remaining teachers underwent military training in 1939. With the start of the Japanese occupation of Malaya on 8 December 1941, he was put in charge of preventing the drivers at the school from escaping, though he was unsuccessful. In 1947, he was awarded a British Council scholarship. He left for England in August, and, beginning in September, he took a year-long course in which he was to "study youth movements and organisations", working with the National Association of Boys' Clubs.

On the conclusion of the course, Jesudason returned to Singapore and was posted to Raffles Institution in February 1950. He was also to serve as one of six instructors in a three months-long intensive study course for student teachers, held at the Anglo-Chinese School's former premises on Cairnhill Road in the second half of 1950. In January 1951, he was a part-time lecturer and librarian with the Teachers' Training College.

By 1958, he was the president of the Singapore Graduate Teachers' Association. A heated dispute on policy between Jesudason and the association's secretary, Chan Joon Gek, arose in that year; this culminated in both Jesudason and Chan resigning from the association in November. In December of that year, he was elected the president of the newly established Singapore Teachers' National Congress, which was initially to be formed by the association to "raise the standard of teaching in English secondary schools." He supported the proposed merger of the congress with other unions representing teachers in Singapore into one "single giant union" representing all teachers registered with the Ministry of Education.

=== Bartley Secondary School ===
In 1955, Jesudason became the headmaster of Bartley Secondary School. At Bartley, he introduced "many new ideas and practices", and the school saw success in several areas under his leadership. In his first year, he introduced gymnastics to the school, a first for the country, in addition to programmes intended to "foster interest in the Fine Arts" and a Prefects' Day for the swearing in of prefects. He formed a partnership with David Lim Kim San, then a music teacher for the school; Jesudason would write lyrics and Lim would compose a melody to go with them. The pair composed several songs for the school. Jesudason introduced music and singing during assembly to the school; this was reportedly yet another first for the country. He would invite performers from Radio Malaya to entertain or talk in the assemblies. He came to be known as a "strict disciplinarian" at Bartley in particular due to the presence of gangsterism in the surrounding area, which affected the school. Punishments he enacted included caning.

=== Raffles Institution ===
In November 1962, Jesudason was transferred to the historic Raffles Institution as its principal. This was his first 'superscale appointment'. According to future Raffles principal Eugene Wijeysingha, Jesudason "pulled the school out of the rut into which it had descended beginning with the Nineteen thirties, except for the period when it came under the sway of Peter Wilson." His appointment to the role ended a particularly tumultuous period of the school's history, with the institution having cycled through six acting headmasters since the resignation of Velauthar Ambiavagar in 1959. The institution of Malayisation led to an exodus of the expatriate staff, and many of the more experienced local staff were being transferred to other schools. The school then "found its standard of education dropping and its premises in chaos." A. K. Sigamoney, the school's senior assistant who would go on to serve as principal, recalled that Jesudason "came in like a breeze, shaking up the school when it was down and regaining for it its moral and educational standard." He "filled the leadership vacuum ably" and "infused enthusiasm and new blood" into the school.

At Raffles, he reorgnanised the school's house system such that there were five houses, with teachers each being assigned to one; this system remains in place. Jesudason was accompanied by David Lim, who had followed him to Raffles, and the pair continued to compose school songs; these included the school anthem, which also remains in place. and established the Music Club and, once again "community singing" during assemblies. This was initially met with opposition from the students and ridicule from the students of rival institutions, though this later grew popular with the former. He regularly organised performances from professional musicians during school assemblies. He again introduced a Prefects' Day. Wijeysingha claimed that while the students initially disliked Jesudason, they eventually grew fond of him.

Jesudason retired from Government Service in 1967. Wijeysingha claimed that he had heard that Jesudason had gotten into a dispute with the Ministry of Education, and that he had "stood his ground and refused to budge from certain principles." This resulted in him quitting two years before he had planned to retire. The school held a "big ceremony" for his resignation. The Straits Times credited Jesudason with having "[helping] create the Rafflesian spirit."

=== Post-retirement activities ===
In 1967, Jesudason became the principal of the International Training Centre, a secretarial, business and language school which first operated out of the International Building on Orchard Road. In 1971, he became the head of Secretarius, a school for secretaries. He remained in this position until he finally decided to retire from teaching altogether in 1976. He also served as the principal to a third private commercial college in this period. However, he joined the Civil Service Institute as a part-time lecturer in July 1979, conducting two courses on written communication for Division Two civil service officers. In 1980, he became the secretary of the newly-formed Association of Retired Teachers of Singapore, which was to serve as a 'consultative body' to the Ministry of Education.

== Personal life and death ==
Jesudason was married with 11 children; seven daughters and four sons. His children included sprinter Janet Jesudason. He was known to be strict in disciplining his children. He was a "good sportsman", particularly in his younger years. He played soccer, hockey and rugby at Raffles College. He captained the Old Edwardians' Association rugby team for six seasons. He also played for the Perak Asiatics rugby team. He was also involved in school gymnastics while in Taiping. He was a Rotarian. Jesudason's close friends included educationist Bertha Neo, best known for her work at Rosyth School. According to her, Jesudason "went out of his way to help others wherever he could, giving advice and moral support". Neo claimed that he would "speak on behalf of someone who needed a job or place in a school."

A musician, Jesudason played several instruments, with the piano, violin and accordion being among his favourites. He and David Lim composed the English-language theme song to the 1973 SEAP Games, held in Singapore in September. Lim had wanted to compose a tune for the event, and he requested that Jesudason write the lyrics. The song was translated into Chinese, Tamil and Malay. Jesudason wrote poetry, and it was through this medium that he "conveyed his thoughts and philosophy". Photography and literature were also hobbies of his.

In his later years, Jesudason suffered from diabetes and heart issues. He had retired from teaching in 1976 due to declining health. Jesudason died on 31 August 1982. He was cremated at Mount Vernon later that day.
