= Epworth United Methodist Church =

Historic church in Illinois, United States

- Epworth Methodist Episcopal Church
- U.S. National Register of Historic Places
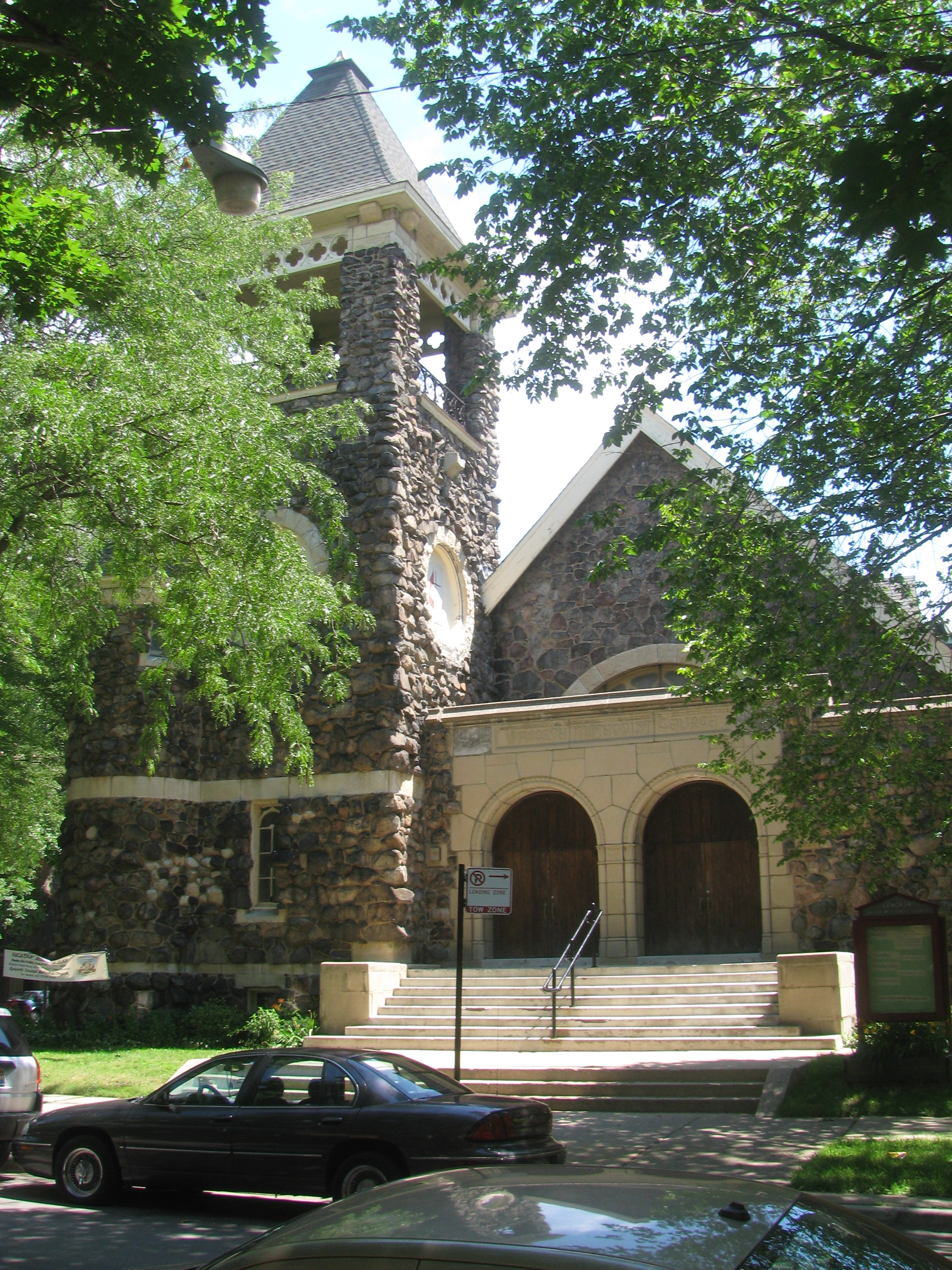

- Location within Chicago metropolitan area Location within Illinois Location within the United States
- Location: 5253 N. Kenmore Ave., Chicago, Illinois
- Coordinates: 41°58′19″N 87°39′37″W
- Area: less than one acre
- Built: 1890
- Architect: Frederick B. Townsend
- Architectural style: Romanesque
- NRHP reference No.: 08000503
- Added to NRHP: June 10, 2008

The Epworth United Methodist Church is a United Methodist church in the Edgewater neighborhood of Chicago, Illinois. It was built in the Romanesque style and is noted for its exterior walls of brown, rusticated boulders. The church was completed in 1891, becoming the second church in Edgewater after the completion of the Episcopal Church of the Atonement in 1889. The structure was enlarged in 1930. The final service at the church was on May 15, 2022.

The site was added to the National Register of Historic Places in 2008 and was designated as a Chicago Landmark on June 21, 2023.

== History ==
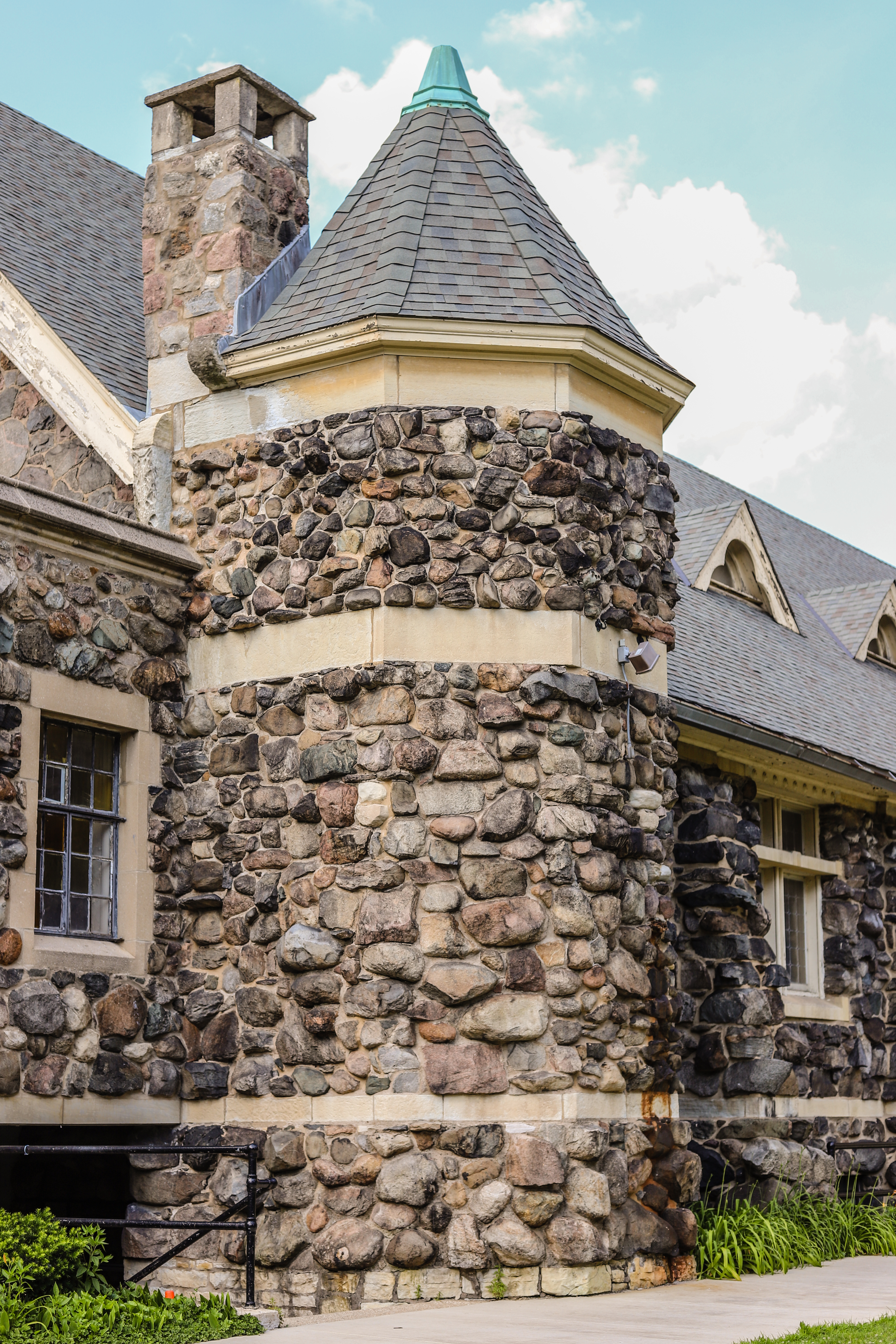
Tower with exterior walls constructed using boulders.

John Lewis Cochran, the founder of Edgewater, donated land for the church in 1886. The church was the only structure at the location; it is now in a dense residential neighborhood with its façade facing Kenmore Avenue. The church was formally organized as the Epworth Methodist Episcopal Church in July 1889, and a cornerstone for the church was dedicated in 1890. The church was designed by Frederick B. Townsend, a parishioner, and completed in the early 1890s. Parts of the church were constructed using boulders from Wisconsin, which were floated south down Lake Michigan.

=== Names ===
- Epworth Methodist Episcopal Church (1889-1948)
- Epworth Methodist Church (1948-1968)
- Epworth United Methodist Church (1968–present)

== Structure ==
The original church structure consisted of a three towers, a sanctuary, and school rooms. The church was enlarged in 1930 to include a basement, gymnasium, chapel, and miscellaneous rooms.

== Heritage designation ==
The church was added to the National Register of Historic Places under the name "Epworth Methodist Episcopal Church" in 2008. The listing included one contributing building and one contributing object.
