= Min Lee =

Singaporean musician

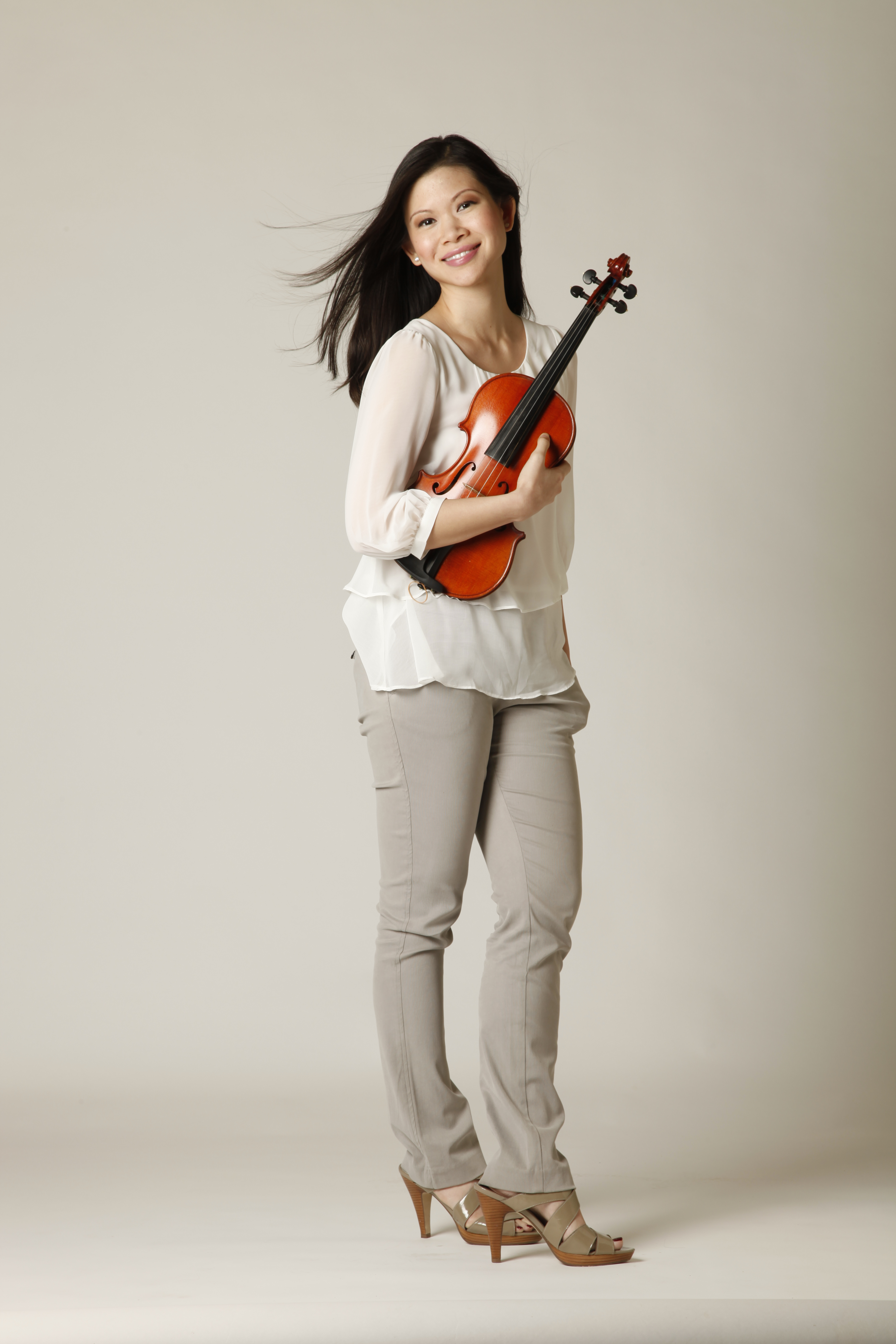
- Singaporean violinist Min Lee in 2011
- Spouse: Loh Lik Peng
- Children: 2

Chinese name
- Simplified Chinese: 李慧铭
- Traditional Chinese: 李慧銘
- Hanyu Pinyin: Lǐ Huìmíng

Lee Huei Min (also known as Min Lee; born 1982 or 1983) is a Singaporean classical violinist. She has been dubbed as "Singapore's poster girl of classical music".

== Career ==
Lee started playing violin at the age of two, and gave her first public performance at five at the Victoria Concert Hall. She went to the United States at the age of nine to study music at the University of Michigan and later at Oberlin College's Conservatory of Music. At the age of 14, Min she was accepted to the Masters program at Yale University. She was tutored by the late, eminent violinist Erick Friedman. Erick himself was a protégé of Jascha Heifetz and Nathan Milstein.

Lee has performed with renowned orchestras including Prague Chamber Orchestra, Singapore Symphony Orchestra, Royal Philharmonic Orchestra, Vienna Chamber Orchestra, Academy of St Martin in the Fields, Tchaikovsky Symphony Orchestra and Russian National Orchestra.

She recorded an album Debut with the Royal Philharmonic Orchestra.

She was given the Singapore Youth Award in 2004.

In 2009, Lee founded Wolfgang Violin Studio Singapore with her mother.

In April 2011 she became brand ambassador for Finnair in Singapore.

She is the Program Director of the Wolfgang Violin Studio.

== Personal life ==
She has three sisters. She is married to restaurateur Loh Lik Peng and has a son and a daughter.
