= Anglo-Chinese School, Ipoh =

School in Ipoh, Malaysia

Coordinates: 4°35′27″N 101°04′13″E

Anglo-Chinese School (ACS), Ipoh
- Sekolah Menengah Kebangsaan Methodist, Ipoh (ACS)
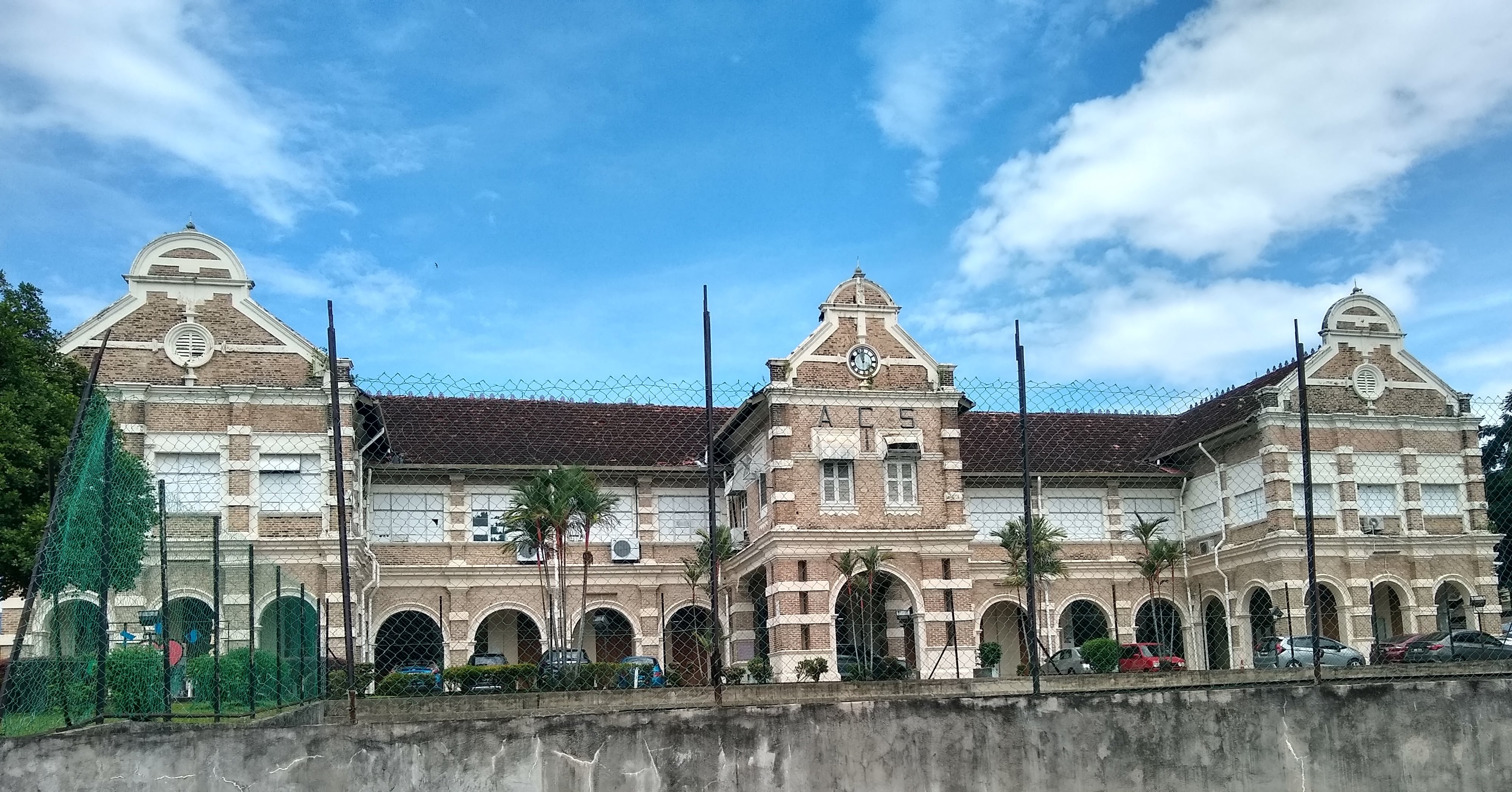

Location
- 111 Jalan Lahat; Ipoh, Perak, 30200; Malaysia

Information
- School type: primary and secondary school
- Motto: Bene orasse est bene studuisse (To have prayed well is to have studied well)
- Religious affiliation: Christian
- Denomination: Methodist Church
- Founded: 5 August 1895
- Founders: Rev William Edward Horley
- Status: Active
- School code: AEB2045
- Principal: Dr. Magaswari A/P Ubbudari
- Years offered: Form One to Form Six (13 to 19 years of age), and Standard One to Standard Six (7 to 12 years of age)
- Enrollment: 1,300 (2019)
- Colors: Blue and yellow
- Rival: St Michael's Institution
- Affiliation: Malaysia Ministry of Education
- Alumni name: Alumni ACS

Anglo-Chinese School, Ipoh, commonly known as SMK Methodist (ACS), Ipoh, is a primary and secondary school in Ipoh, Kinta District, Perak, Malaysia. One of the oldest schools in Malaysia, it was the first English school and first missionary school to be established in Ipoh and Kinta District.

== History ==
The school traces its history back to 1895, when William Edward Horley, a British Methodist Missionary arrived in Ipoh from Singapore, and opened a school in a small attap-roofed house with an initial enrolment of four boys. A few months later, he acquired a piece of land from the government on which he built a two-storey wooden structure with $3,324 provided by local donors which was opened on 3 May 1896. Named "Horley Hall", and today used as the school's museum, it is the oldest Methodist building in Peninsula Malaysia, and served as a school from Monday to Friday and a church on Sunday. By 1907, enrolment had reached 550 pupils and further buildings had been erected on the site with funds donated by towkays Foo Choo Choon and Loke Yew.

In 1912, with the assistance of a government grant of $25,000 and $68,000 from public donations, Horley began construction of a new school on the site facing Lahat Road. The foundation stone of the Edwardian style building, designed by architect C.H. La Brooy, was laid on 1 August 1912, and was formally opened by Sir Arthur Young on 30 March 1914. On completion, the school campus was considered arguably the best Methodist facility in Malaya, and under Horley's leadership the school thrived.

In 1940, during World War Two, the school was requisitioned by the British army, and in 1941 was damaged in an air raid by Japanese planes. During the Japanese occupation of Malaya, it was used as a headquarters by the Japanese army. In 1946, when repairs and refurbishment works had been completed, enrolment had reached 1,000 pupils. Further expansion of the school followed during the 1950s and 1960s with major building projects.

== Academic program ==
The school serves students from Form One to Form Six (13 to 19 years of age), and in the primary school, Standard One to Standard Six (7 to 12 years of age). It is one of the few schools in Ipoh which provides Sixth Form education. In February 2025, new principal, Dr. Magaswari A/P Ubbudari was appointed.

== Extra–curricular activities ==
The school is highly regarded as a sporting school, known for having produced many sportsmen who have competed at the Olympics and at international level. It has a strong sporting rivalry with St Michael's Institution, Ipoh.

== Former Principals ==
Former principals of the school up to 2011. The names and dates of former principals are listed in a plaque in the school.

- Rev. W. E. Horley 1895–1896
- Rev. A. J. Amery 1896
- Dr. Eglund 1897
- S. H. Wood 1898–1899
- H. L. Luering 1900
- S. H. Wood 1901–1905
- Rev. W. E. Lowther 1905
- Rev. W. P. Rutledge 1905
- A. G. Beaumont 1906–1908
- Rev. A. J. Amery 1908–1910
- Rev. W. E. Horley 1910–1915
- T. W. Hinch 1915–1918
- Rev. W. E. Horley 1918–1919
- T. W. Hinch 1919–1920
- Rev. W. L. Matson 1920
- Rev. P. L. Peach 1920–1921
- Rev. R. A. Blasdell 1921–1922
- Rev. P. L. Peach 1922
- Rev. R. A. Blasdell 1922–1923
- Rev. A. McNab 1923–1924
- Rev. R. A. Blasdell 1924–1926
- Rev. L. Proebstel 1926–1931
- Rev. F. H. Sullivan 1931–1932
- Rev. L. Proebstel 1932–1934
- R. Kesselring 1934
- P. B. Bell 1934–1939
- R. Kesselring 1939–1940
- Rev. T. Runyan 1940–1941
- J. L. Taylor 1941
- Aw Boon Jin 1945–1946
- Ho Seng Ong 1946–1948
- Rev. R. Kesselring 1948–1957
- Teerath Ram 1957–1974
- R. Subramaniam 1975–1984
- Ling Ong Sen 1984–1985
- Daniel Chan 1986–1991
- Paul Devadason 1992
- Thomas Kok 1992–2000
- Victor Chew 2000–2001
- Tan Tiek Lee 2001–2005
- Chieng Sai Lak 2005–2011
- Soot Mooy Ching 2011–

== Notable alumni ==
- Teoh Seng Khoon, badminton player.
- Cheah Soon Kit, badminton player.
- Thong Saw Pak, weightlifter.
- Philip Sankey, hockey player.
- Jagjit Singh Chet, hockey player.
- Poon Fook Loke, hockey player.
- Allen Ong, swimmer.
- Anthony Ang, swimmer.
- Karu Selvaratnam, sprinter.
- Toh Chin Chye, Deputy Prime Minister, Singapore, 1959.
- Abdul Aziz al-Muʽtasim Billah Shah of Perak
- Tan Sri Dato’ Ainuddin Abdul Wahid, 1st Vice Chancellor of Universiti Teknologi Malaysia
- Abdul Hamid Khan bin H.S. Ali, Minister of Education, Federation of Malaya, 1962.
