= Goh Hood Keng =

Peranakan minister

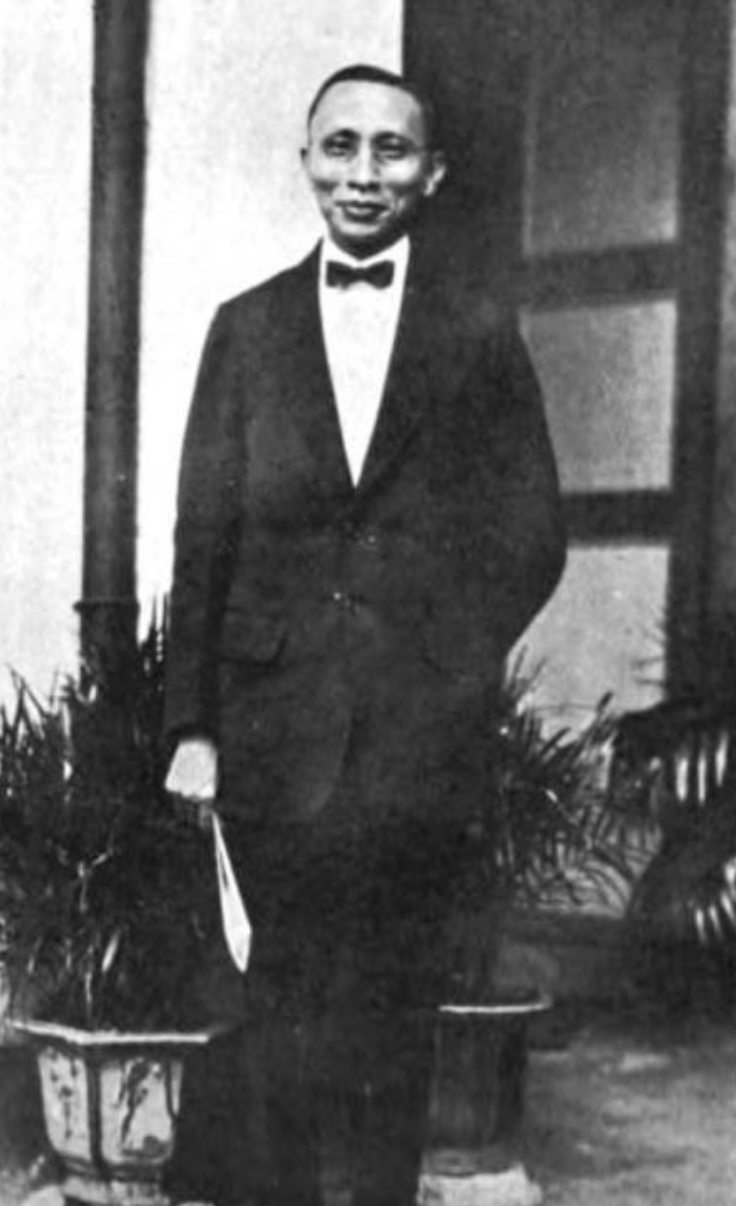
Goh Hood Keng

Goh Hood Keng (Chinese: 吳弗慶, 27 February 1888 – 30 January 1961) was the first Peranakan to be ordained a Methodist minister.

== Early life and education ==
Goh was born in Singapore on 27 February 1888. He was the elder brother of Goh Hood Kiat. Despite both of his parents being devout Buddhists, they sent him to the Anglo-Chinese School, which was run by Methodists. While there, he converted to Christianity in 1905, and while his family and friends were initially disapproving of his decision to convert, three of his four siblings and his father eventually converted as well.

== Career ==
Following his graduation, he joined the school's teaching staff, and preached on weekends. He served as the assistant editor of The Friend of the Babas, the earliest existing Baba Malay magazine, along with Goh Leng Inn from 1906 to 1908, when the magazine was discontinued. In 1912, he became an unpaid supply preacher at the Middle Road Church, and revived the Baba Epworth League. He was ordained a Deacon in February 1915 and, after a four-year course, was ordained an Elder in February 1919. By 1916, he was responsible for Standard V, Standard VI and Standard VII at the Anglo-Chinese School. He also became the conference president in 1917 and the pastor of the Middle Road Church in 1918. In the 1910s, he served as the editor of the Recorder, the bi-monthly publication of the Straits Chinese Literary Society. He also served as the secretary of the Singapore Social Purity Union. He became the head of the newly-established Serangoon English School in 1920. In the same year, he was elected to represent Malaya at the Methodist General Conference in the United States, becoming the first Asian to do so. He contracted leprosy in the mid-1920s and travelled to India, seeking specialist treatment. While there, he held Sunday services in the hospital and taught Bible classes. He was cured of leprosy in 1927 and, after returning to Singapore, chose to leave the Anglo-Chinese School.

Throughout the 1930s, Goh went on tours in various locations across Malaya to evangelise those in the region. In 1934, he toured Java and, while there, helped the Christians of nine towns form an organisation. In 1937, he was made a Justice of the Peace. He chose to remain in Singapore prior to the Fall of Singapore and became the vice-president of the Malaya Methodist Church Council during the Japanese occupation of Singapore. Following the end of the occupation in 1945, he oversaw the recovery of his parish. He became an adviser to the Juvenile Court in 1946. He retired in early 1952, after which he was appointed a District Evangelist, and continued to give sermons and lectures.

== Personal life and death ==
Goh was married and had nine children. He died on 30 January 1961 after a short illness. His nephew was politician Goh Keng Swee, a former Deputy Prime Minister of Singapore.
