= University of Technology Malaysia =

Universiti Teknologi Malaysia
- Malay: Universiti Teknologi Malaysia
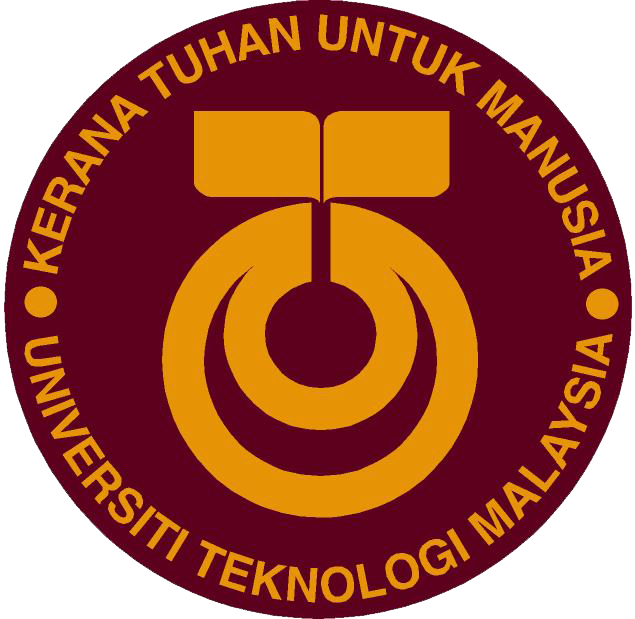
- Former names: Technical School (1904–1941); Technical College (1942–1971); Institut Teknologi Kebangsaan (1971–1975)
- Motto: Kerana Tuhan Untuk Manusia
- Motto in English: In the Name of God for Mankind
- Type: Public research university
- Established: 14 March 1972; 54 years ago
- Affiliations: ASAIHL, FUIW, APUCEN
- Chancellor: Raja Zarith Sofiah
- Vice-Chancellor: Mohd Shafry Mohd Rahim
- Academic staff: 2,624
- Students: 32.325 (2020)
- Undergraduates: 14,538 (2020)
- Postgraduates: 8,775 (2020)
- Doctoral students: 4,555 (2020)
- Location: Jalan Iman, 81310 Skudai, Johor, Malaysia, Skudai, Iskandar Puteri, Johor, Malaysia
- Colours: Maroon and gold
- Website: www.utm.my
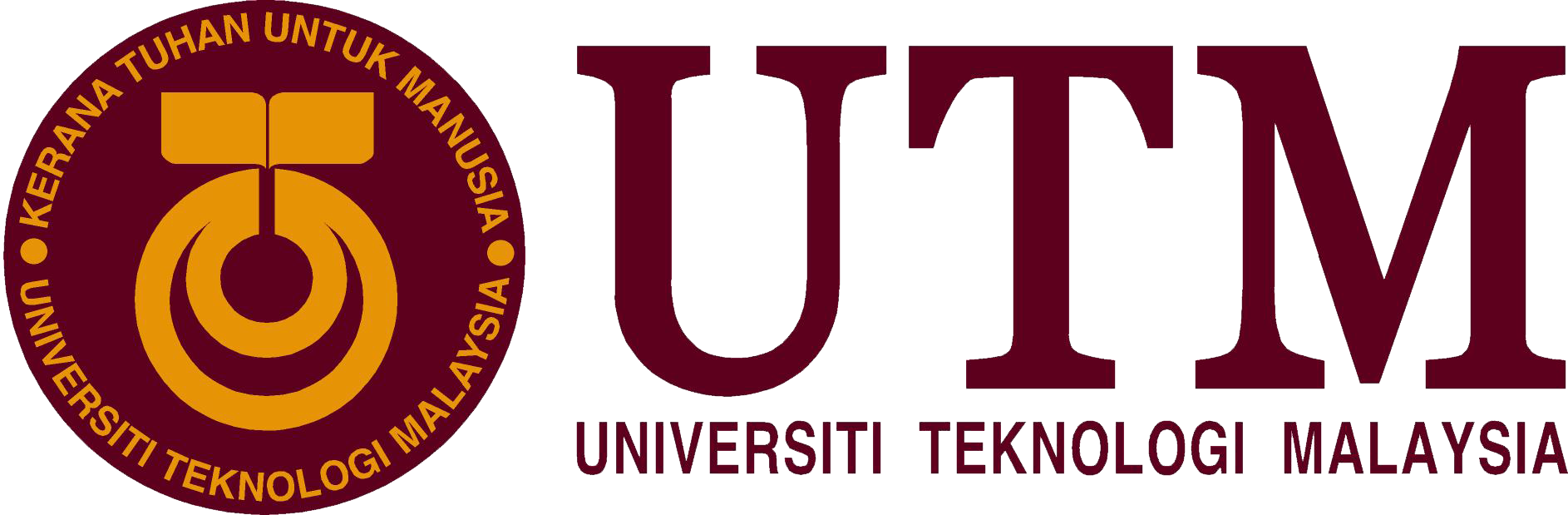

Universiti Teknologi Malaysia (UTM) (Malay: Universiti Teknologi Malaysia) is a Malaysian public research university.

== Campuses ==
UTM has three campuses – the main campus in Skudai with an area of 1144 hectares, the Pagoh campus in Muar District with an area of 50 hectares and the Kuala Lumpur campus with an area of 35 hectares.

== Vice-chancellors ==
No.	Vice Chancellor	Term In office
1.	Ainuddin Wahid	1975 – 1989
2.	Muhammad Ridzuan Salleh	1990 – 1994
3.	Ahmad Zaharudin Idrus	1994 – 2001
4.	Mohd Zulkifli Mohd Ghazali	2001 – 2008
5.	Zaini Ujang	2008 – 2013
6.	Wahid Omar	2013 – 2020
7.	Ahmad Fauzi Ismail	2020 – 2024
8.	Mohd Shafry Mohd Rahim	2025 – present

== Research Management Centre ==
Research Management Centre was established in 1982. Formerly known as 'Research and Consultation Unit' and as 'Research & Development Unit' and finally renamed as 'Research Management Centre', in 1997.

== Rankings ==
University rankings

Global – Overall
- ARWU World: 701-800 (2022)
- QS World: =153 (2026)
- THE World: 601-800 (2023)
- USNWR Global: 379 (2023)

In the QS University Rankings, it placed 100 in the "Engineering & Technology Universities" category among other world ranked universities in 2016 UTM aims to achieve the status of a global university and rank among 50 of the world's best universities by 2020.

Ranking	2012	2014	2015	2016	2017	2018	2019	2020	2021	2022	2023	2024	2025	2026
QS World University Rankings	358	355	294	303	288	253	228	217	187	191	203	188	181	153

== Notable alumni ==
The alumni of University of Technology Malaysia include politicians and public service officials such as Wee Ka Siong, former Malaysian Minister of Transport, Annuar Musa, former Malaysian Minister of Communications and Multimedia, Hamzah Zainudin, former Malaysian Minister of Home Affairs, Saarani Mohamad, current Menteri Besar of Perak, Acryl Sani Abdullah Sani, former Malaysian Inspector-General of Police and current President of Parti Gerakan Rakyat Malaysia, Dominic Lau Hoe Chai.

== See also ==
- List of Islamic educational institutions
- List of universities in Malaysia
