= William Edward Horley =

British missionary and educationalist

William Edward Horley MBE
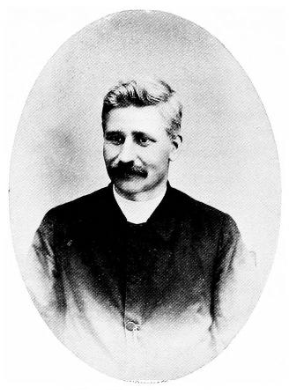
- From a 1908 publication
- Born: 5 June 1870
- Died: 2 April 1931 (aged 60)
- Occupations: Missionary and educationalist
- Years active: 1895-1931
- Organization: Methodist Episcopal Church
- Spouse: Ada Emily Hocking
- Children: 1 son and 1 daughter

William Edward Horley MBE (5 June 1870 – 2 April 1931) was a Methodist missionary and educationalist in Malaya. In addition to his missionary work for the Methodist Episcopal Church, many schools, both religious and secular, were opened in Malaya largely through his efforts.

== Early life ==
Rev. William Edward Horley was born on 5 June 1870 in Bloxham, and was educated at Bloxham School, and Harley College, a missionary training school in Bromley-by-Bow.

== Career ==
In 1895, Horley was sent to the Anglo-Chinese School, Singapore, founded by Bishop William Fitzjames Oldham as a missionary teacher, and in the following year was ordained in the Wesleyan Ministry.

In 1896, he was sent to Ipoh to start a school, and within a month opened a school in a Malay house. Soon after, the government gave him four acres of land on which he built a church which he also used for the school which then had around 50 pupils. By 1912, he had raised $68,000 from public donations to construct a new school building and, with the aid of a grant from the government of $25,000, commenced construction. On 30 April 1914, the school, the Anglo-Chinese School, Ipoh, was formerly opened by Sir Arthur Young, when enrolment had grown to 729 pupils, with 21 teachers.

In 1898, he founded the Methodist Girls' School in Ipoh with a Miss Towers as principal. It operated initially from an attap shed until it was moved to the Anglo-Chinese boys' school when it was completed in 1912.

In 1901, he was appointed by the Methodist mission to help establish a school in Kuala Lumpur. He visited the Anglo-Tamil School, which had been opened in 1897 by Rev. Kensett, which operated from a small shop-house with around 50 boys, and moved it an unused pork market in Malacca Street which provided additional space. After a year, he was ordered to vacate and he moved the school to a mission hall in Sultan Street whilst he continued to raise funds through public donations for the construction of a new school building. By 1904, he had received sufficient funds to commence construction, and the foundation stone of the Methodist Boys' School was laid on Petaling Hill in December, and was formerly opened eight months later by Sir William Taylor, Resident General of the Straits Settlements.

During his career, he was also associated with the founding of the Methodist schools in Kampar, Teluk Anson and Klang and other places where, on and off, he served as school principal or as head of the district.

In addition to promoting education, he continued to carry out missionary work for the Methodist Episcopal Church, heading the Methodist Committee of Education, and for many years was its presiding elder in the Federated Malay States.

In 1928, he left the Federated Malay States and went to Singapore to assume the role of superintendent of the Methodist Episcopal Mission.

== Death and personal life ==
Horley married Ada Emily Hocking and they had a son and a daughter. He died in Singapore on 2 April 1931, aged 60.

== Honours and legacy ==
Horley was appointed a Member of the Most Excellent Order of the British Empire (MBE) in the King's Birthday Honours 1926. Horley Road in Ipoh was named after him.
