= List of missionary schools in Malaysia =

Missionary schools in Malaysia have their origins derived from British colonialism.

== Background ==
Under the Aziz report, many missionary schools opted to be nationalised in 1971.

== Statistics ==
Nearly half of such schools are located in the Christian-majority Sarawak state.

== Primary schools ==
=== Methodist schools ===
- Sekolah Kebangsaan Methodist, Nibong Tebal
- Sekolah Kebangsaan Pykett Methodist
- Sekolah Kebangsaan Perempuan Methodist, Pulau Pinang
- Sekolah Kebangsaan Ho Seng Ong Methodist
- Sekolah Kebangsaan Horley Methodist
- Sekolah Kebangsaan Methodist, Ayer Tawar
- Sekolah Kebangsaan Methodist, Ipoh
- Sekolah Kebangsaan Perempuan Methodist, Ipoh
- Sekolah Kebangsaan Methodist, Parit Buntar
- Sekolah Kebangsaan Methodist, Sitiawan
- Sekolah Kebangsaan Methodist, Sungai Siput
- Sekolah Kebangsaan Methodist, Taiping
- Sekolah Kebangsaan Methodist (Acs), Lumut
- Sekolah Kebangsaan (P) Treacher Methodist
- Sekolah Kebangsaan Methodist, Tanjong Malim
- Sekolah Kebangsaan Methodist, Tanjong Rambutan
- Sekolah Kebangsaan Perempuan Methodist, Teluk Intan
- Sekolah Kebangsaan Methodist (1)
- Sekolah Kebangsaan Methodist, Lumut
- Sekolah Kebangsaan Methodist, Malim Nawar
- Anglo Chinese School, Klang
- Sekolah Kebangsaan Methodist (Integ) (M)
- Sekolah Kebangsaan Methodist (M)
- Sekolah Kebangsaan Methodist Acs, Selangor
- Sekolah Kebangsaan Methodist, Petaling Jaya
- Methodist Girls' School, Klang
- Sekolah Kebangsaan Methodist Jalan Stadium
- Sekolah Kebangsaan Methodist (L) Jalan Hang Jebat (M)
- Sekolah Kebangsaan (P) Methodist (2), Kuala Lumpur
- Sekolah Kebangsaan Methodist Acs, Melaka
- Sekolah Kebangsaan (P) Methodist (1), Melaka
- Sekolah Kebangsaan (P) Methodist (2), Melaka
- Sekolah Kebangsaan Perempuan Methodist, Kuantan
- Sekolah Kebangsaan Perempuan Methodist, Pahang
- Sekolah Kebangsaan Methodist, Kapit
- Sekolah Kebangsaan Methodist Anglo-Chinese

=== Convent schools ===
- Sekolah Kebangsaan Convent, Kedah
- Sekolah Kebangsaan Convent Father Barre
- Sekolah Kebangsaan Convent 1, Butterworth
- Sekolah Kebangsaan St Anne's Convent, Jalan Kulim
- Sekolah Kebangsaan Convent, Green Lane
- Sekolah Kebangsaan Convent, Lebuh Light
- Sekolah Kebangsaan Convent, Pulau Tikus
- Sekolah Jenis Kebangsaan (C) Convent Datuk Keramat
- Sekolah Kebangsaan Convent, Sitiawan
- Sekolah Kebangsaan Convent, Ipoh
- Sekolah Jenis Kebangsaan (C) Ave Maria Convent
- Sekolah Kebangsaan Tarcisian Convent
- Sekolah Kebangsaan Marian Convent
- Sekolah Jenis Kebangsaan (T) St. Philomena Convent
- Sekolah Kebangsaan Convent, Teluk Intan
- Sekolah Kebangsaan St. Bernadette'S Convent
- Sekolah Kebangsaan Convent, Taiping
- Sekolah Kebangsaan Convent Aulong, Taiping - One of only three coeducational Convent schools in Malaysia
- Sekolah Jenis Kebangsaan (T) St. Teresa Convent - One of only three coeducational Convent schools in Malaysia
- Sekolah Kebangsaan Convent, Selangor
- Sekolah Kebangsaan Convent (1) (M)
- Sekolah Kebangsaan Convent (2) (M)
- Sekolah Kebangsaan St Anne's Convent, Selangor
- Sekolah Kebangsaan Convent (1) Bukit Nanas (M)
- Sekolah Kebangsaan Convent (2) Bukit Nanas
- Sekolah Kebangsaan Convent Sentul 1 (M)
- Sekolah Kebangsaan Convent Sentul 2 (M)
- Sekolah Jenis Kebangsaan (T) St. Joseph's Convent
- Sekolah Kebangsaan Convent Of The Infant Jesus (1)
- Sekolah Kebangsaan Convent Of The Infant Jesus (2)
- Sekolah Jenis Kebangsaan (C) Notre Dame Convent
- Sekolah Kebangsaan Sacred Heart Convent
- Sekolah Kebangsaan Convent, Batu Pahat
- Sekolah Kebangsaan Convent, Muar
- Sekolah Kebangsaan Infant Jesus Convent
- Sekolah Kebangsaan Canossian Convent, Kluang
- Sekolah Kebangsaan Canossian Convent, Segamat
- Sekolah Kebangsaan Convent, Tanah Rata - One of only three coeducational Convent schools in Malaysia
- Sekolah Kebangsaan St. Francis Convent
- Sekolah Kebangsaan St. Mary Convent
- Sekolah Kebangsaan Convent, Kajang

=== La Salle schools ===
- Sekolah Kebangsaan St. Theresa
- Sekolah Kebangsaan St. Patrick
- St. Michael's Institution, Ipoh
- St. Xavier's Institution, Penang
- St. George's Institution, Taiping
- St. Francis' Institution, Melaka
- St. Paul's Institution, Seremban
- St. Anthony's Institution, Teluk Intan
- St. Andrew's School, Muar
- Sekolah Kebangsaan St. George Balik Pulau
- Sekolah Kebangsaan Assumption
- Sekolah Kebangsaan La Salle, Ipoh
- Sekolah Kebangsaan St. George
- Sekolah Kebangsaan St. Michael
- Sekolah Kebangsaan St. Anthony
- Sekolah Kebangsaan De La Salle
- Sekolah Kebangsaan St. Francis, Perak
- Sekolah Kebangsaan Stella Maris
- La Salle School, Petaling Jaya
- La Salle School, Klang
- Sekolah Kebangsaan La Salle (1) Brickfields
- Sekolah Kebangsaan La Salle (2) Brickfields (M)
- Sekolah Kebangsaan La Salle 1, Jinjang Utara
- Sekolah Kebangsaan La Salle 2, Jinjang Utara
- Sekolah Kebangsaan La Salle (1) Sentul
- Sekolah Kebangsaan La Salle Sentul 2 (M)
- Sekolah Kebangsaan St. Francis, Melaka
- Sekolah Kebangsaan St. Andrew, Johor
- Sekolah Kebangsaan St. Theresa, Kuching
- Sekolah Kebangsaan St. Joseph, Kuching

=== Anglican Church schools ===
- Sekolah Kebangsaan St. Alban, Kuching
- Sekolah Kebangsaan St. Alban, Serian
- Sekolah Kebangsaan St. Alban, Duras
- Sekolah Kebangsaan St. Alphonsus
- Sekolah Kebangsaan St. Ambrose
- Sekolah Kebangsaan St. Andrew, Sarikei
- Sekolah Kebangsaan St. Andrew, Simunjan
- Sekolah Kebangsaan St. Andrew, Kuching
- Sekolah Kebangsaan St. Anne
- Sekolah Kebangsaan St. Anthony, Serian
- Sekolah Kebangsaan St. Anthony, Bintulu
- Sekolah Kebangsaan St. Barnabas
- Sekolah Kebangsaan St. Barnabas Baru
- Sekolah Kebangsaan St. Bartholomew
- Sekolah Kebangsaan St. Bernard, Kuching
- Sekolah Kebangsaan St. Bernard, Dalat
- Sekolah Kebangsaan St. Christopher Debak
- Sekolah Kebangsaan St. Columba
- Sekolah Kebangsaan St. David
- Sekolah Kebangsaan St. Dominic, Serian
- Sekolah Kebangsaan St. Dunstan, Kuching
- Sekolah Kebangsaan St. Dunstan, Sriaman
- Sekolah Kebangsaan St. Edmund, Limbang
- Sekolah Kebangsaan St. Edward
- Sekolah Kebangsaan St. Faith Sekama
- Sekolah Kebangsaan St. Francis Xavier, Kanowit
- Sekolah Kebangsaan St. Francis Xavier, Sarawak
- Sekolah Kebangsaan St. Gile
- Sekolah Kebangsaan St. Gregory
- Sekolah Kebangsaan St. Henry
- Sekolah Kebangsaan St. James Quop
- Sekolah Kebangsaan St. James Rayang
- Sekolah Kebangsaan St. John, Betong
- Sekolah Kebangsaan St. John, Dalat
- Sekolah Kebangsaan St. John, Kota Samarahan
- Sekolah Kebangsaan St. John, Sarawak
- Sekolah Kebangsaan St. John, Serian
- Sekolah Kebangsaan St. John Taee, Serian
- Sekolah Kebangsaan St. Joseph, Miri
- Sekolah Kebangsaan St. Joseph, Kuching
- Sekolah Kebangsaan St. Lawrence
- Sekolah Kebangsaan St. Leo Gayau
- Sekolah Kebangsaan St. Luke, Dalat
- Sekolah Kebangsaan St. Luke, Sriaman
- Sekolah Kebangsaan St. Mark, Bentong
- Sekolah Kebangsaan St. Mark, Sibu
- Sekolah Jenis Kebangsaan (C) St. Martin
- Sekolah Kebangsaan St. Martin, Kota Samarahan
- Sekolah Kebangsaan St. Martin, Sriaman
- Sekolah Kebangsaan St. Mary, Sibu
- Sekolah Kebangsaan St. Mary, Sarawak
- Sekolah Kebangsaan St. Mathew
- Sekolah Kebangsaan St. Matthew, Kuching
- Sekolah Kebangsaan St. Matthew, Sibu
- Sekolah Kebangsaan St. Michael, Serian
- Sekolah Kebangsaan St. Michael, Kota Samarahan
- Sekolah Kebangsaan St. Michael, Plassu
- Sekolah Kebangsaan St. Norbert Paun
- Sekolah Kebangsaan St. Paul, Kuching
- Sekolah Kebangsaan St. Paul, Jalan Green
- Sekolah Kebangsaan St. Paul, Sriaman
- Sekolah Kebangsaan St. Paul, Roban
- Sekolah Kebangsaan St. Peter
- Sekolah Kebangsaan St. Peter & St. Paul
- Sekolah Kebangsaan St. Peter Saratok
- Sekolah Kebangsaan St. Philip, Kuching
- Sekolah Kebangsaan St. Philip, Serian
- Sekolah Kebangsaan St. Pius, Marudi
- Sekolah Kebangsaan St. Raymond
- Sekolah Kebangsaan St. Rita
- Sekolah Kebangsaan St. Stephen, Sarawak
- Sekolah Kebangsaan St. Swithun
- Sekolah Kebangsaan St. Teresa, Bau
- Sekolah Kebangsaan St. Teresa, Kuching
- Sekolah Kebangsaan St. Teresa, Serian
- Sekolah Kebangsaan St. Theresa, Kuching
- Sekolah Kebangsaan St. Thomas
- Sekolah Kebangsaan St. Columba, Miri
- Sekolah Kebangsaan St. Joseph, Miri
- Sekolah Kebangsaan St. Pius Long San, Miri
- Sekolah Kebangsaan St. Christopher Debak, Betong
- Sekolah Kebangsaan St. Paul Roban, Betong
- Sekolah Kebangsaan St. Peter Saratok, Betong
- Sekolah Kebangsaan St. Anthony Bintulu
- Sekolah Kebangsaan St. Alban Duras, Kuching
- Sekolah Kebangsaan St. Andrew Kuching
- Sekolah Kebangsaan St. Augustine Padawan, Kuching
- Sekolah Kebangsaan St. Elizabeth Padawan, Kuching
- Sekolah Kebangsaan St. Faith Sekama, Kuching
- Sekolah Kebangsaan St. George, Kuching
- Sekolah Kebangsaan St. Gregory, Kuching
- Sekolah Kebangsaan St. James Quop, Kuching
- Sekolah Kebangsaan St. John Bau, Kuching
- Sekolah Kebangsaan St. Joseph Kuching
- Sekolah Kebangsaan St. Mary Kuching
- Sekolah Kebangsaan St. Matthew, Kuching
- Sekolah Kebangsaan St. Patrick Bau, Kuching
- Sekolah Kebangsaan St. Patrick Padawan, Kuching
- Sekolah Kebangsaan St. Paul Padawan, Kuching
- Sekolah Kebangsaan St. Stephen Bau, Kuching
- Sekolah Kebangsaan St. Teresa Bau, Kuching
- Sekolah Kebangsaan St. Teresa Kuching
- Sekolah Kebangsaan St. Teresa Padungan, Kuching
- Sekolah Kebangsaan St. Thomas Kuching
- Sekolah Kebangsaan St. Edmund, Limbang
- Sekolah Kebangsaan St. Luke Sri Aman
- Sekolah Kebangsaan St. Mary Sibu
- Sekolah Kebangsaan St. Rita Sibu
- Sekolah Kebangsaan St. Alphonsus, Sarikei
- Sekolah Kebangsaan St. Anne, Sarikei
- Sekolah Kebangsaan St. Augustine Meradong, Sarikei
- Sekolah Kebangsaan St. John Taee, Samarahan
- Sekolah Kebangsaan St. Jude Bunan, Samarahan
- Sekolah Kebangsaan St. Martin, Samarahan
- Sekolah Kebangsaan St. Michael, Samarahan
- Sekolah Kebangsaan St. Patrick Tangga, Samarahan
- Sekolah Kebangsaan St. Raymond Mujat, Samarahan
- Sekolah Kebangsaan St. Teresa Serian, Samarahan
- Sekolah Kebangsaan St. John Kampung Medong, Mukah
- Sekolah Kebangsaan St. Jude, Mukah
- Sekolah Kebangsaan St. Kevin Sungai Kut, Mukah
- Sekolah Kebangsaan St. Patrick Mukah
- Sekolah Kebangsaan St. Columba, Miri
- Sekolah Kebangsaan St. Joseph, Miri
- Sekolah Kebangsaan St. Pius Long San, Miri

=== Diocesan parish schools ===
- SJK (T) St. Mary, Parit Buntar
- SJK (C) Sacred Heart, Penang
- SK Shang Wu, Penang,
- SJK (C) St. Joseph, Johor Bahru
- SK St. Joseph, Johor Bahru
- SJK (C) Heng Ee, Penang
- SK Montfort, Batu Pahat
- SK St. Paul, Tanjung Tualang
- Sekolah Kebangsaan St. Augustine, Kuching
- Sekolah Kebangsaan St. Augustine, Bentong
- Sekolah Kebangsaan St. Augustine, Bintangor
- SK Catholic English (M), Kuching
- Sekolah Kebangsaan St. Patrick, Kuching
- Sekolah Kebangsaan St. Patrick, Mukah
- Sekolah Kebangsaan St. Patrick, Bau
- Sekolah Kebangsaan St. Patrick, Serian
- Sekolah Kebangsaan St. Elizabeth
- Sekolah Kebangsaan St. Jude (M), Dalat
- Sekolah Kebangsaan St. Jude (M), Serian
- Sekolah Kebangsaan St. Kevin (M), Dalat

=== Marist Brothers school ===
- SJK (C) Sam Tet, Ipoh
- SJK (C) Katholik, Melaka

=== Others ===
- Sekolah Kebangsaan Assunta, Petaling Jaya
- Sekolah Kebangsaan Assunta, Kuantan
- Sekolah Kebangsaan St. Joseph, Kuantan

== Secondary schools ==
=== Methodist schools ===
- Methodist Boys' School (Penang)
- Methodist Girls' School (Penang)
- Sekolah Menengah Kebangsaan Methodist, Air Tawar
- Sekolah Menengah Kebangsaan Methodist, Ipoh
- Anglo Chinese School, Kampar
- Sekolah Menengah Kebangsaan Methodist, Parit Buntar
- Sekolah Menengah Kebangsaan Methodist, Sungai Siput
- Sekolah Menengah Kebangsaan Methodist, Tanjong Malim
- Anglo Chinese School, Sitiawan
- Sekolah Menengah Kebangsaan Horley Methodist
- Methodist Girls' School, Ipoh
- SMK Treacher Methodist Girls' School
- Sekolah Menengah Kebangsaan Methodist, Selangor
- Anglo Chinese School, Klang
- Methodist Girls' School, Klang
- Methodist Boys' School (Kuala Lumpur)
- Sekolah Menengah Kebangsaan (P) Methodist, Kuala Lumpur
- Sekolah Menengah Kebangsaan Methodist Anglo Chinese School, Negeri Sembilan
- Anglo-Chinese School, Malacca
- Sekolah Menengah Kebangsaan Perempuan Methodist, Melaka
- Methodist Girls Secondary School, Kuantan
- Sekolah Menengah Kebangsaan (P) Methodist, Raub
- Sekolah Menengah Kebangsaan Methodist, Sibu

=== Convent schools ===
- Sekolah Menengah Kebangsaan Convent St. Nicholas, Alor Setar
- Sekolah Menengah Kebangsaan Convent Father Barre, Sungai Petani
- Sekolah Menengah Kebangsaan St. Anne's Convent, Kulim
- Sekolah Menengah Kebangsaan Convent (M) Bukit Mertajam
- Sekolah Menengah Kebangsaan Convent Butterworth
- Sekolah Menengah Kebangsaan Convent Green Lane
- Sekolah Menengah Kebangsaan Convent Lebuh Light
- Sekolah Menengah Kebangsaan Convent Pulau Tikus
- Sekolah Menengah Jenis Kebangsaan Convent Datuk Keramat
- Sekolah Menengah Kebangsaan St. Bernadette's Convent, Batu Gajah
- Sekolah Menengah Kebangsaan Convent, Sitiawan
- Sekolah Menengah Kebangsaan Tarcisian Convent, Ipoh
- Sekolah Menengah Kebangsaan Convent (M) Ipoh
- Sekolah Menengah Jenis Kebangsaan Ave Maria Convent, Ipoh
- Sekolah Menengah Kebangsaan Convent, Teluk Intan
- Sekolah Menengah Kebangsaan Convent Taiping
- Sekolah Menengah Kebangsaan Convent Kajang
- Sekolah Menengah Kebangsaan Convent Bukit Nanas
- Sekolah Menengah Kebangsaan Convent Sentul (M)
- Sekolah Menengah Kebangsaan Convent Jalan Peel
- Sekolah Menengah Kebangsaan Canossa Convent, Melaka
- Sekolah Menengah Kebangsaan Infant Jesus Convent, Melaka
- Sekolah Menengah Kebangsaan Notre Dame Convent
- Sekolah Menengah Kebangsaan Convent, Muar
- Sekolah Menengah Kebangsaan Convent Batu Pahat
- Sekolah Kebangsaan Canossian Convent, Kluang
- Sekolah Kebangsaan Canossian Convent, Segamat
- Sekolah Menengah Kebangsaan Infant Jesus Convent, Johor Bahru
- Sekolah Menengah Kebangsaan St. Francis Convent (M), Kota Kinabalu
- Sekolah Menengah Kebangsaan Konven St. Cecilia, Sandakan

=== La Salle schools ===
- Sekolah Menengah Kebangsaan St. Michael, Kedah
- Sekolah Menengah Kebangsaan St. Patrick, Kedah
- Sekolah Menengah Kebangsaan St. Theresa
- Sekolah Menengah Kebangsaan St. George, Pulau Pinang
- Sekolah Menengah Kebangsaan St. Xavier
- St. George's Institution, Taiping
- St. Michael's Institution, Ipoh
- St. Anthony's School, Teluk Intan
- La Salle School, Petaling Jaya
- La Salle School, Klang
- Sekolah Menengah Kebangsaan La Salle Brickfields (M)
- Sekolah Menengah Kebangsaan La Salle Sentul (M)
- St. Paul's Institution, Seremban
- St. Francis Institution, Melaka
- Sekolah Menengah Kebangsaan St. Thomas, Pahang
- Sekolah Menengah Kebangsaan St. Andrew, Johor
- Sekolah Menengah Kebangsaan St. Joseph's Secondary School, Kuching
- SMK Sacred Heart, Sibu, Sibu
- Sekolah Menengah St. Martin, Tambunan
- La Salle Secondary School, Kota Kinabalu

=== Anglican Church schools ===
- St. George's Girls' School (Penang, Malaysia)
- Hutchings School, (Penang
- St. Mary's School, Kuala Lumpur
- St. Gabriel's Secondary School, Kuala Lumpur
- St. David's High School, Malacca
- SMK St. Anthony Sarikei
- SMK St. Thomas, Kuching
- Sekolah Menengah Kebangsaan St. Mary, Kuching
- Sekolah Menengah Kebangsaan St. Teresa
- SMK St. Columba, Miri
- SMK St. Thomas, Kuching
- Sekolah Menengah Kebangsaan St. Luke, Sri Aman
- SMK All Saints, Kota Kinabalu
- St. Michael's Secondary School, Sandakan
- SM St. Mary, Papar
- SM St. Paul, Beaufort

=== Diocesan parish schools ===
- SMJK Sacred Heart, Penang
- SMJK (C) Katholik, Tanjung Malim
- SMJK (C) Heng Ee, Penang
- SMK St. Thomas, Kuantan
- Catholic High School, Bentong
- SMK St. Joseph, Johor Bahru
- SMK St. Teresa, Kuching
- Sekolah Menengah Kebangsaan St. Patrick, Mukah
- Sekolah Menengah Kebangsaan St. Augustine, Betong
- Sekolah Menengah Kebangsaan St. Elizabeth, Sibu
- SM St. James Tenghilan, Tuaran
- SM St. John, Tuaran
- SM St. Michael, Penampang
- SM Stella Maris, Kota Kinabalu
- SM Holy Trinity, Tawau
- SM St. Peter, Telipok
- SM St. Francis Xavier, Keningau
- SM St. Anthony, Tenom
- SM St. Patrick Membakut
- SM St. John, Beaufort
- SMK St. Martin, Tambunan
- SM St. Peter, Kudat
- SM St. Mary, Sandakan
- SM St. Mike, Sandakan
- SM St. Patrick, Tawau
- SM St. Ursula, Tawau
- SMK St. Dominic, Lahad Datu

=== Marist Brothers ===
- SMJK Sam Tet, Ipoh
- Catholic High School, Petaling Jaya
- Catholic High School, Melaka

=== London Missionary Society ===
- Penang Free School
- Malacca High School

=== Mill Hill schools ===
- St Joseph's School, Miri

=== Others ===
- Assunta Secondary School, Petaling Jaya
- Bukit Bintang Girls' School, Kuala Lumpur
- Bukit Bintang Boys' Secondary School, Petaling Jaya
- Pudu English Secondary School, Kuala Lumpur
