= Anglo-Chinese School (disambiguation) =

Anglo-Chinese School may refer to:

- Anglo-Chinese School, a family of Methodist schools in Singapore
  - Anglo-Chinese School (Primary) and Anglo-Chinese School (Junior), primary schools in Singapore
  - Anglo-Chinese School (Independent)
  - Anglo-Chinese School (Barker Road)
  - Anglo-Chinese Junior College
- ACS Jakarta in Indonesia
- Anglo-Chinese Schools, Malaysia, several Methodist schools not affiliated with the Singapore schools, including:
  - Anglo Chinese School, Kampar
  - Anglo Chinese School, Sitiawank
  - Anglo Chinese School, Klang
- Tiong Se Academy, in Manila, Philippines, formerly Anglo-Chinese School

== See also ==
- Ying Wa College, Hong Kong, founded in Malacca, Malaysia as Anglo-Chinese College
