= St. Columba's National Secondary School =

- Sekolah Menengah Kebangsaan St. Columba
- Miri, Sarawak; Malaysia

Information
- Type: Public, Secondary School
- Motto: Peace And Service
- Denomination: Anglican
- Established: 16 January 1929
- Founder: Canon Paul Chong En Siong
- School district: Miri
- Session: Double
- Principal: Mr. Subah anak Nyareng
- Houses: Chong, McDougall, Danson, Lim
- Colours: Red, White and Blue
- Yearbook: Character First
- Website: smkstcolumbamiri.gbs2u.com

St. Columba's National Secondary School (Malay: Sekolah Menengah Kebangsaan St. Columba) or simply St. Co is a public secondary school in Miri, a city in the East Malaysian state of Sarawak. Established in 1929, it is the oldest school in Miri. The school educates students from Transition to Secondary 5 level and it prepares students for the Pentaksiran Tingkatan 3 and Sijil Pelajaran Malaysia examinations which are administered by the Ministry of Education. It was made a 'Sekolah Harapan Negara' (Nation's School of Hope) in the year 1993.

== History ==
St. Columba's National Secondary School is established in 1929 as a missionary school by the late Reverend Canon Paul Chong En Siong.

=== Pre-War Period (1929-1941) ===
In 1910, Miri was just a small fishing village. Even though petroleum had been discovered in Miri, drillings and excavations were carried out only on a small scale by Borneo Company Limited. Foreign technicians and labourers who were mainly Anglican strongly felt the need for a church. In 1918, Bishop Logie Danson came to Miri to discuss the building of a new church.

On 3 September 1922, St. Columba's Church was completed and officially declared open by R.S Douglas. The church was named Saint Columba's Church after the Irish-born priest who lived in the 6th century. The presence of the church attracted a few priests to Miri. One of them was Rev. Paul Chong En Siong (who would later become the founder of Saint Columba's School). The first task given to Reverend Paul was to establish a new school in Miri. Sarawak Oilfields Limited donated land south of the church and an old building to be used for educational purposes. Surprisingly, the land donated by Sarawak Oilfields Limited is still in use today as the site of Saint Columba's Secondary School (SMK St. Columba).

Rev. Chong and Rev. F.W. Synott used the old building which was also an old government quarter as the first classroom. Saint Columba's School was officially declared open on 16 January 1929 with 13 students enrolled. Saint Columba's School was the first mission school in Miri. The establishment of St. Columba's School received a tremendous response from the people of Miri. Within the period of one month, the number of students had greatly increased.

Wan Thau Fen was appointed as a teacher at the new school. After that, two new classrooms were constructed. In the beginning, English was used as the medium of teaching. In the 1930s, with the increasing number of students, Father Paul felt the need to build a new building with four classrooms. In 1934, Reverend Paul Chong left the school to continue his missionary work in Kuching, Kudat and other parts of Sabah (British North Borneo).

His post as headmaster was taken over by Yeo Cheng Ho. At that time, the school faced two major problems: a shortage of classrooms and lack of funds. When Yeo Cheng Ho left for Kuching in 1937, his post was taken over by Lee Kui Choi until the Japanese occupation of British Borneo. Back then, the number of students had increased to 107 with seven teachers and four new classrooms. The British Government had started to support Saint Columba's School financially.

=== Japanese Occupation Period (1941-1945) ===
On 8 December 1941, the Second World War in the Pacific had begun and all the schools in Miri were closed. The Imperial Japanese Army landed in Miri on 16 December 1941 and occupied Saint Columba's School, which was used by the Imperial Japanese Army as a storeroom. Lee Kui Choi was arrested and put in jail, but was released three days later.

After handing over his duties to Reverend Lim Siong Teck, Lee Kui Choi returned to Sibu. The Kempetai (Japanese Secret Police) arrested and killed Reverend Lim Siong Teck, Chong En Fui and Joel Paul, a member of the Saint Columba's Church Council.

By the end of the Second World War in the Pacific, the Imperial Japanese Army had retreated from Miri. Before they retreated, they destroyed all the school buildings except the toilet and one of the stores. All the school belongings and records were destroyed except for the school's bank records. The Second World War had brought devastation to the school.

With the buildings destroyed, some people serving in the Anglican Church doubted the future of the school. The school faced major financial problems at this point of time. This period was very critical and crucial in the school's history. Thankfully, the school was gradually rebuilt and is what it is today, one of the best schools in Miri.

=== Post War Period (1945-1965) ===
On 14 September 1945, the school made a proposition to Major Pollett, a member of the British Borneo Civil Affairs Unit (BBCA.U) to reopen Saint Columba's School. The proposal was approved and on 17 September 1945 the school was reopened with only two teachers, namely Liew Kit Siong and Molly Leong and 41 students. They were assisted by one untrained teacher.

Liew Kit Siong was then chosen as the principal of the school. On the first day, several English medium classes were reopened with 39 students in the morning and 21 students for the Chinese medium class in the afternoon. At the end of the first week, the number of students had increased to 79 and 39 students for the English and Chinese medium classes respectively. Throughout the year 1945, more than 200 students had enrolled. Due to the shortages of classrooms and teachers, most applicants were rejected. Additional classes were held inside Saint Columba's Church (present day St. Columba's Kindergarten).

During this period, financial support came from school fees and the monthly support of 100 dollars by the Sarawak Oilfields Limited and 80 dollars by the British Army Administration. This helped Saint Columba's School to survive until this very day. Due to the increasing number of students, additional classes were held in the Miri Gymkhana Club (GCM) storeroom.

== Administration ==
| Name | Position |
|---|---|
| Jimbun anak Masam | Principal |
| Wong Hao Ming | Senior Assistant of Administration |
| Charles Ling | Senior Assistant of Student Affairs |
| Ong Sze Chong | Afternoon Session Students Supervisor |
| Grispin anak Sahah | Senior Assistant of Extracurricular Activities |

=== Principals of St. Columba's Secondary School ===
| No | Names Of Principals | Years Of Service |
|---|---|---|
| 1 | Canon Paul Chong En Siong | 1929-1935 |
| 2 | Yeo Cheng Ho | 1935-1937 |
| 3 | Lee Kui Choi | 1937-1945 |
| 4 | Liew Kit Siong | 1945-1946 |
| 5 | Yeo Siew Ngo | 1946-1948 |
| 6 | Lim Choo Tiong | 1948-1949 |
| 7 | Tan Ah Beng | 1949-1950 |
| 8 | Yeo Ah Choo | 1950-1957 |
| 9 | Perry Clough | Temporary |
| 10 | Yeo Ah Choo | 1956-1957 |
| 11 | Harold Rogers | 1958-1959 |
| 12 | Peter Joliffe | 1959-1961 |
| 13 | Brian Taylor | 1962-1964 |
| 14 | Nigel Heyward | 1964-1969 |
| 15 | Leonie Armour | 1970-1981 |
| 16 | Chan Siew Ngo | 1981-1996 |
| 17 | Raymond Gai Panting @ Gaie | 1997-2000 |
| 18 | Richard Wong King Kui | 2001-2009 |
| 19 | Robinette Tiong Ai Giek | 2009-2014 |
| 20 | Meechang Tuie | 2014-2016 |
| 21 | Subah anak Nyareng | 2016-2023 |
| 22 | Jimbun Anak Masam | 2024–Present |

=== Prefectorial Board ===
Currently there are 6 Prefect branches. They are:

1. 3K Branch (Pengawas 3K)
2. Discipline Branch (Pengawas Discipline)
3. PRS Branch (Pengawas PRS)
4. Co-curriculum Branch (Pengawas Ko-Kurikuler)
5. School Librarian Branch (Pengawas Pusat Sumber)
6. Class Prefect (Pengawas Kelas)

== Notable Alumni (famous ex-Columbans) ==
- Watson Nyambek (Malaysian athlete) – Record holder for Malaysians of 100m sprint record of 10.30 seconds
- Doria Rachel Jolly - Malaysian Actress
