= SMK Convent =

SMK Convent may refer to

- SMK Convent, Alor Setar
- SMK Convent Bukit Nanas
- SMK Convent Taiping
