= St. Teresa's National Secondary School =

- Sekolah Menengah Kebangsaan St. Teresa

Location
- Jalan Tun Abang Haji Openg; Kuching, Sarawak, 93000; Malaysia

Information
- Type: All-girls convent
- Motto: Amare Et Servire (Love and Serve)
- Religious affiliation: Catholic
- Denomination: Roman Catholic Church (St. Joseph's Cathedral, Kuching)
- Established: 1885
- Sister school: SMK St. Joseph
- Principal: Disin Nyaom
- Enrollment: c. 1,300
- Language: Bahasa Malaysia, English
- Colour: Brown
- Yearbook: The Looking Glass
- Affiliation: Ministry of Education (Malaysia); Archdiocese of Kuching
- Website: www.smkst-teresa.edu.my

St. Teresa's National Secondary School (Malay: Sekolah Menengah Kebangsaan St. Teresa) is an all-girls secondary school in Kuching, in East Malaysia, founded in 1885. The school is a mission school partially owned by the government.

== Location ==
The school is located opposite St. Joseph's National Secondary School, which is an all-boys school. Situated at Jalan Tun Abang Haji Openg, the school comprises five buildings altogether. The convent block, built in 1925, holds St. Teresa's Secondary School's Administrative office.

The school is divided into two sessions, morning session (upper secondary students of Form 3, Form 4 and Form 5) and afternoon session (lower secondary students of Form 1 - Form 2)

The school founder was Sister Teresa Cheetham.

It is a tradition in SMK St Teresa to hold a biennial Food and Fun Fair for fund-raising purposes to improve the school's surrounding and to add facilities. Today, the school has approximately 1300 girls with 74 teachers. The school has 35 classes with each form comprising 7 classes. There are 3 science stream and 4 arts stream classes for Form 4 and Form 5.

== History ==
St. Teresa's School was named by Reverend Father Jackson MHM in honour of a Carmelite sister. He arrived in Borneo in 1881 upon the invitation of Rajah Charles Brooke to establish Catholic mission schools in Kuching and Kanowit. The name chosen for the convent and school was in fulfillment of a promise made years prior by Rev. Father Jackson. While still a student, he found great difficulty in mastering Philosophy and Theology. In his distress he appealed to the great Saint Teresa of Avila to intercede for him and promised he would do something in her honour, if his wish was granted.

St. Teresa was born in Avila, Spain, in 1515 and died in 1582. She came from a noble family with high moral values. However, she gave up all her material possessions and became a Carmelite nun in 1536. Because of her great wisdom, intelligence, humility, diligence and integrity she was declared a Doctor of the Church in September 1880. Since its foundation in 1885, the school has been entrusted under her patronage and protection, and therefore it is expected that the students of St. Teresa's School emulate and uphold her qualities and virtues.

St. Teresa's School in Kuching, Sarawak, Malaysia, had its beginnings in a small shop, at 149 Yorkshire Street, Rockdale, in England. The shop was kept by Alice Ingham and her widowed stepmother.

Ingham and a small group of friends conducted religious classes for children; they nursed the sick; they assisted with parish work. After a few years of this, Ingham was asked by Bishop Herbert Vaughan to undertake the management of domestic affairs at a newly founded missionary college in Mill Hill, near London. This meant that she was to be in charge of household toil- cooking, cleaning and pressing linen with heavy charcoal irons until 2 in the morning with four sisters. They no longer taught, nursed nor earned money for their many charities.

In 1883, the Congregation of St. Joseph's Missionary Sisters of the Sacred Heart was officially formed. Some of its members grouped in communities outside the college, but Mill Hill was where Mother Francis (Alice Ingham) lived. Mill Hill was the Congregation's centre of gravity- it was also the link between Sarawak and Rochdale.

A political exception in its day, Sarawak in the late 19th century was an oriental principality founded by Sir James Brooke in 1841, who expanded the boundaries of Sarawak, until his death in 1868, leaving a sizable amount of land to his nephew, Charles Brooke.

Rajah Charles Brooke had been in his uncle's service throughout his adult life. Rajah Charles disliked European commercial influence of the money-grabbing kind. The Borneo Company was the only foreign firm allowed to operate in Sarawak for a long time. He believed that unchecked western influence was sure to exploit and spoil the natives of Sarawak, and included the Christian missionaries in his suspicions, remarking once that Bishops are a bit of a nuisance out here and the missions do not benefit the Dayaks.

The Rajah expected the missionaries to settle the Dayaks; to transform them into law-abiding citizens of the sturdy gentlemen type. When Rajah Charles mentioned the Dayaks, he usually meant the Ibans, Sarawak's largest tribal group, and the one he understood and loved the most.

And so, when a letter came to him from the Bishop Vaughan requesting permission to set up a Catholic Mission in Sarawak, he wrote back: "... the Sarawak Government will have no objection to there being a Catholic Mission. I would recommend that your missionaries, on their arrival, to a district of Dayaks who have been almost untouched by teachings of any sort. This district would not be far from the capital, in which almost everything in the way of clothes, etc. can be obtained..."

== Principals ==
- Sister Theresa Cheetham (1885–1902)
- Sister Sebastian Leitner (1902–1924)
- Sister Bernadine O'Driscoll (1924–1938)
- Rev. Mother Joseph Connaughton (1924–1938)
- Sister Judith Egan (1968–1971)
- Mrs. Thankam Paul (1971)
- Sister Sylvia Cheong (1972–1982, 1987–1992)
- Mrs. Molly Chong (1982–1987)
- Mrs. Anna Dreba (1992-September 1997)
- Christopher Tan (1997–2005)
- Christopher Su Hiong Ai (2005–2006)
- Mary John (2006–present)
