= Anglo-Chinese Schools, Malaysia =

The Anglo-Chinese Schools of Malaysia refer to several Methodist-founded schools in Malaysia. These schools are not affiliated with the Anglo-Chinese Schools of Singapore, despite being founded by the same denomination.

== Malacca ==
- Anglo-Chinese School (ACS) or SMK Methodist, Malacca
- Ying Wa College, formerly Anglo-Chinese College

== Penang ==
Methodist Boys' School, Penang (formerly Anglo Chinese School Penang or ACSP). Sekolah Menengah Kebangsaan Methodist, Nibong Tebal(Nibong Tebal Methodist School, formerly ACS, Nibong Tebal)

== Negeri Sembilan ==
- SMK Methodist (ACS), Seremban (1915)
- SK Methodist (ACS), Seremban (1915)

== Perak ==
- SM Methodist (ACS), Ipoh (1895)
- SMK Horley Methodist (ACS), Teluk Intan (1899)
- SM Methodist (ACS), Kampar
- SMK Methodist (ACS), Sitiawan (1903)
- SMK Methodist (ACS), Parit Buntar (1907)

== Selangor ==
- SK Methodist (ACS), Klang (1893)
- SM Methodist (ACS), Klang (1893)
