= Bukit Bintang Boys' Secondary School =

Coordinates: 3°6′31.28″N 101°38′28.49″E

Bukit Bintang Boys Secondary School
- Sekolah Menengah Kebangsaan (L) Bukit Bintang
- Petaling Jaya, Selangor Darul Ehsan; Malaysia

Information
- Type: All-boys secondary school
- Motto: Latin: Nisi Dominus Frustra (Without God, All is vanity)
- Religious affiliation: Christian
- Denomination: The Brethren Church
- Established: 1958
- Founder: Miss Mary Glasgow
- School district: Petaling
- Grades: Form 1 - 5
- Gender: Male; Co-educational (Form 6)
- Colours: Olive green, yellow
- Yearbook: The Bintang
- Website: sites.google.com/moe-dl.edu.my/thebintang/

Bukit Bintang Boys Secondary School (Malay: Sekolah Menengah Kebangsaan (L) Bukit Bintang; abbreviated SMKLBB or BBBSS) was established in 1958, making it one of the oldest secondary boys school in the city of Petaling Jaya, Selangor, Malaysia.

The school only holds one school session. The morning session is for Form 1 to Form 5 students. This is so to accommodate the large number of students attending the school. The pupils are known as "BBians". It welcomes students from all races and religions.

== History ==
The school was founded by Miss Mary Glasgow, who was the headmistress of Bukit Bintang Girls' School (BBGS)

The municipal council, Majlis Perbandaran Petaling Jaya (MPPJ) (now named Majlis Bandaraya Petaling Jaya, MBPJ); allocated a piece of land to Glasgow for building a school for the community. Although the land was available, no money was provided to build it. Glasgow and the Bukit Bintang Girls' School students swung into action; raising money by holding fun fairs, food fairs and plays. Within a short time, the girls had raised enough to build the boys' school. Miss Yeoh Kim Eng (a retired teacher of BBGS) recounted the time when BBGS teachers and students, armed with buckets and bins, came to the newly built boys' school to wash and clean the building.

At its establishment, The Malay Mail, a local daily, called it the brother school of Bukit Bintang Girls' School. After deliberation with teachers and advisers to name the new school, Glasgow named it Bukit Bintang Boys' Secondary School in connection to the girls' school Glasgow founded.

As a young nation in 1957-58, the Malaysian government welcomed help from all quarters to build schools and to give its citizens an education. Christian missionaries such as Glasgow opened "Christian" schools in the early 1960s, usually in the rural areas. They either bought land or were granted land in outskirt areas (often rural, undeveloped areas) and were left to their own ingenuity to develop and build their schools. Although the schools were started by missionaries, the curriculum was based on government guidelines and was usually non-religious, although Bible studies were encouraged. Initially, classes were taught in English but has since changed to Bahasa Melayu in line with the government directives. Since 2003 (under government directives PPSMI), Science and Mathematics were taught in English.

The school's first Principal (known as the Headmaster) was Alastair L. McGregor (now Doctor) from Scotland. He served the school from 1958 to 1966. He was only a young man of 28 when he accepted the challenge to run a school halfway round the world from his home in Scotland, United Kingdom.

In 1961, the secondary school was moved to its current location in Jalan Utara, Petaling Jaya; and at that time, each form (Form 1 to 5) consisted of only one class. A year later in 1962 - the year when the first group of students sat for the Cambridge Examination, the school's opening ceremony took place and McGregor was appointed the first headmaster.

In 1976, a new science block was built at the cost of RM200,000.00. This block consists of three science laboratories and a lecture theatre. This block was named 'The Boler Block' in honour of David Boler, the headmaster at the time. Funds to build new wings were mostly raised by the students and teachers. Help was also given by certain Christian associations.

In 2000, Bukit Bintang Girls' School moved to a new location in Cheras and did not retain its original name; it is now known as SMK Seri Bintang Utara. The Pavilion shopping centre was built over the old location.

=== 50th Anniversary ===
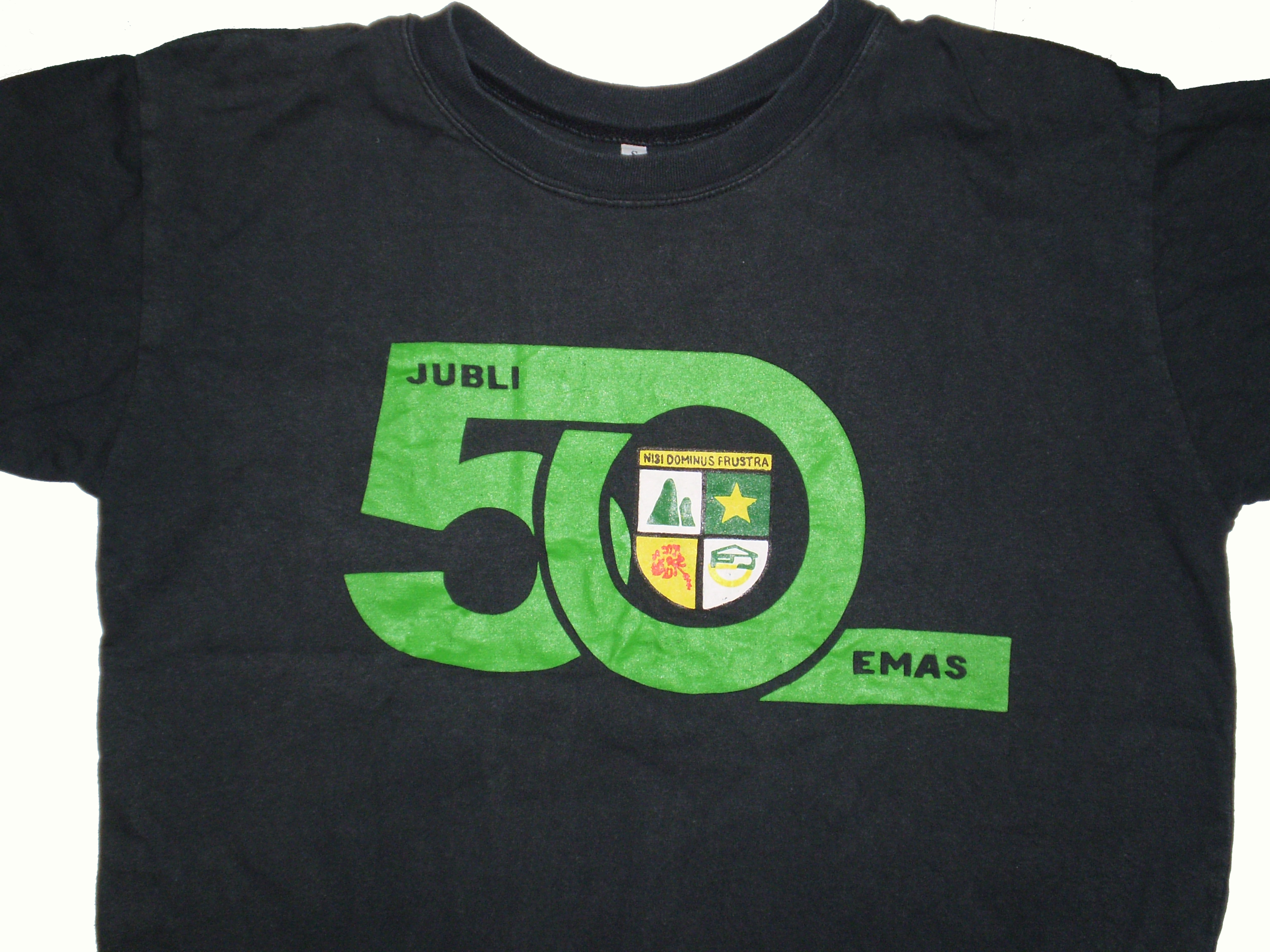
50th Anniversary T-shirt

In 2008, the school celebrated its 50th anniversary (Golden Jubilee). Tan Sri Musa Hassan, Malaysia's Inspector-General of Police, a BB alumnus, was the guest of honour. A 50th anniversary T-shirt was released and sold by the school Co-operative.

== School identity ==
The school motto is the Latin phrase: Nisi Dominus Frustra – 'Without God All is Vanity'; and is derived from Psalm 127:1.

=== Headteachers ===
McGregor in a 1961 class photo

1971 class photo

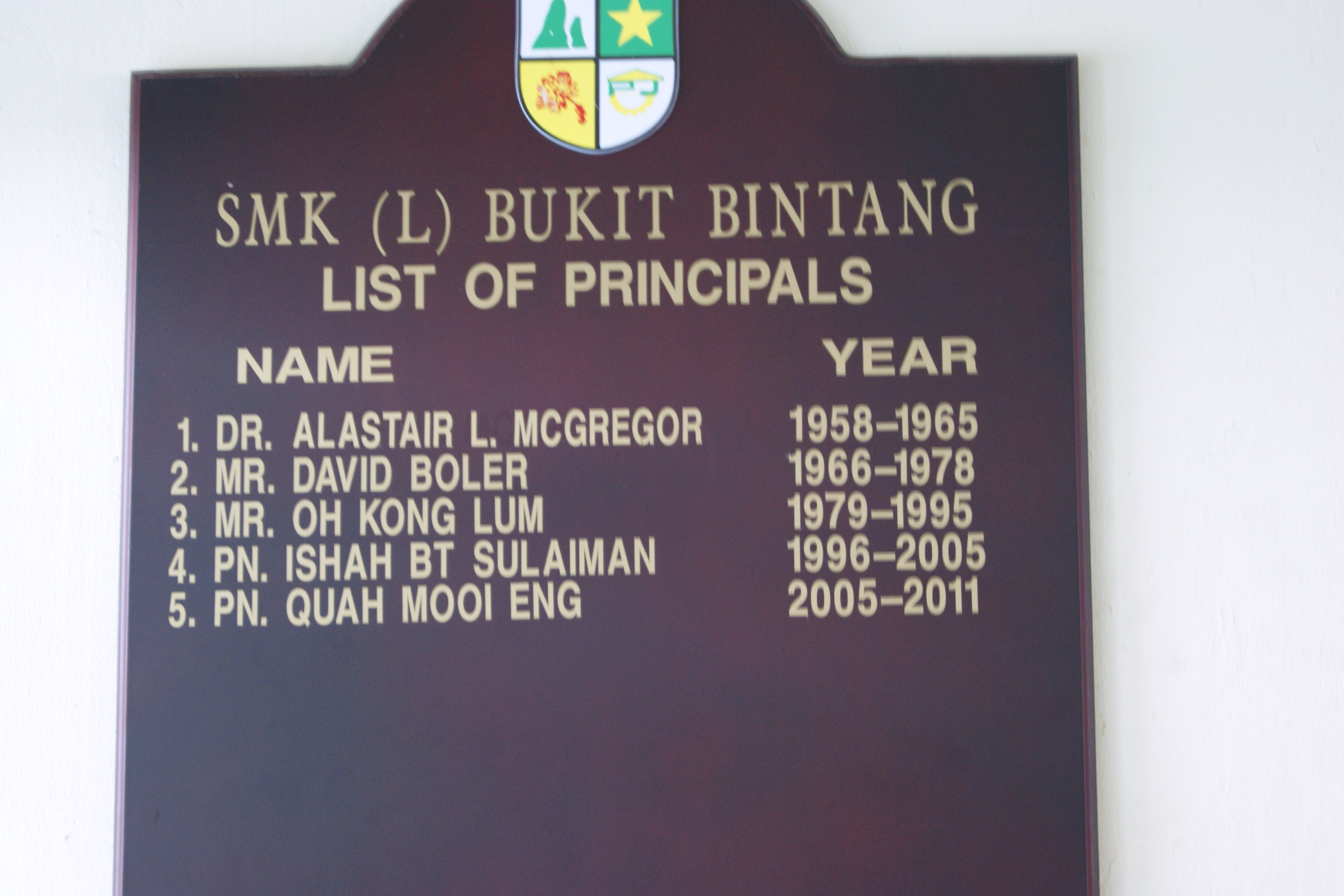
List of Principals

- Alastair L. McGregor (1958–1965)
- David Boler (1966–1978)
- Oh Kong Lum (1979–1995)
- Ishah bt. Sulaiman (1996–2005)
- Quah Mooi Eng (2006–2011)
- Tong Ah Ten (2011-2013)
- Koh Sui Keng (2013–2017)
- Parthipan A/L Subramaniam (2017-2022)
- Ts. Hj. Shanusi bin Hj Ahmad (2022–present)

=== The school badge ===
The second headmaster, FDavid Boler (1966–1978) designed a new school badge when he replaced McGregor. The top left hand corner of the badge depicts hills which stands for 'Bukit' followed by the top right hand corner which shows a star which stands for 'Bintang', a Malay word meaning star. The bottom left hand corner indicates the national flower 'Bunga Raya' (Hibiscus) and thus represents 'Malaysia.'

The design of a roof above the letters 'PJ' means that the school is situated in Petaling Jaya. The shape that resembles a gear below the letters 'PJ' symbolises that Petaling Jaya is an industrialised area. Boler redesigned the school tie by adding the design of the school badge onto the plain olive green tie.

=== School Song ===
There is two versions of the school song, Bahasa Melayu and English. The music that accompanies the School Song are Camberwell in C-Unison by John Michael Brierley.

=== School magazine ===
The school magazine is "The Bintang". The magazine reports the school's activities for the year, club activities, official school functions, news about teachers and students.

== Facilities ==
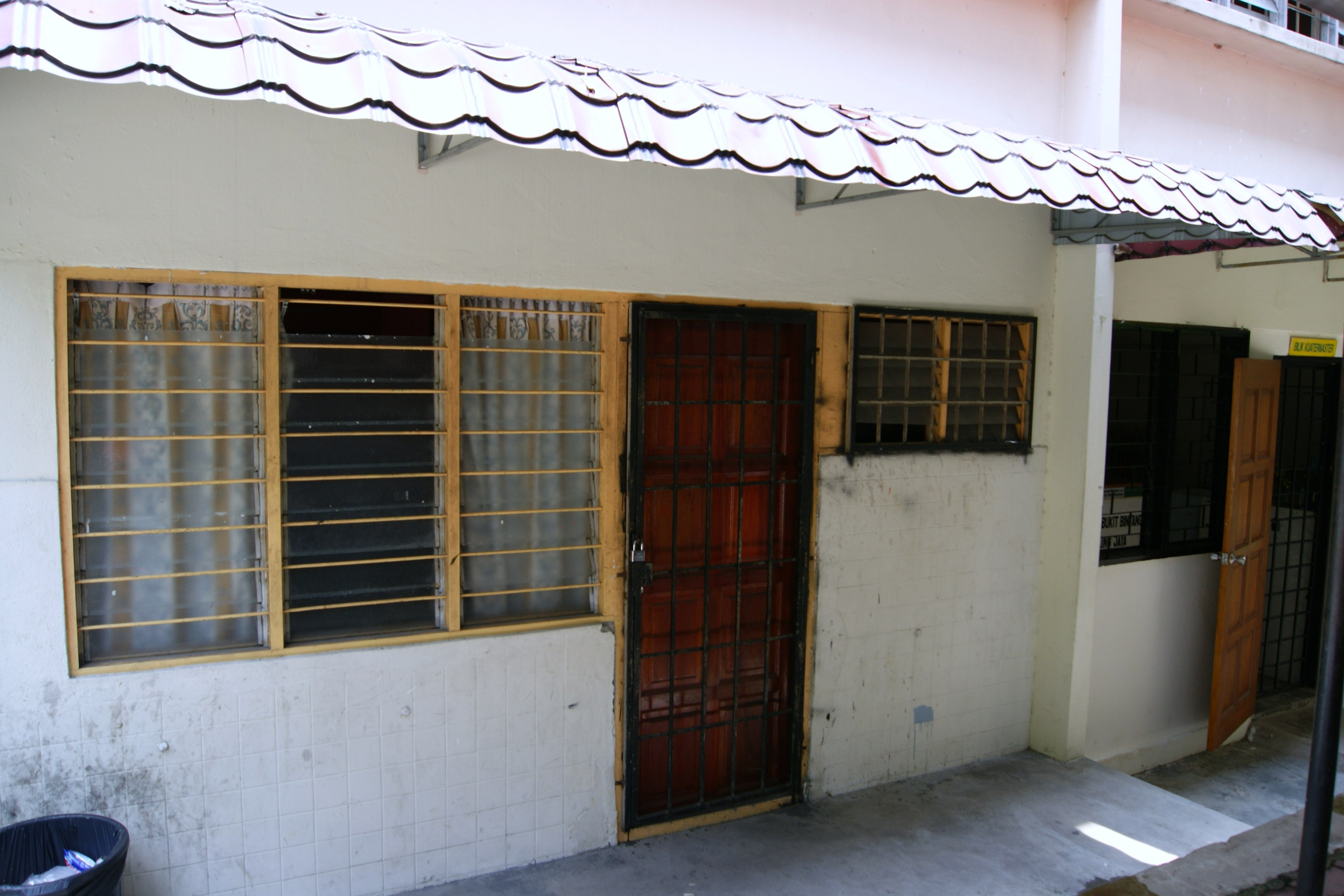
New PBSM Room

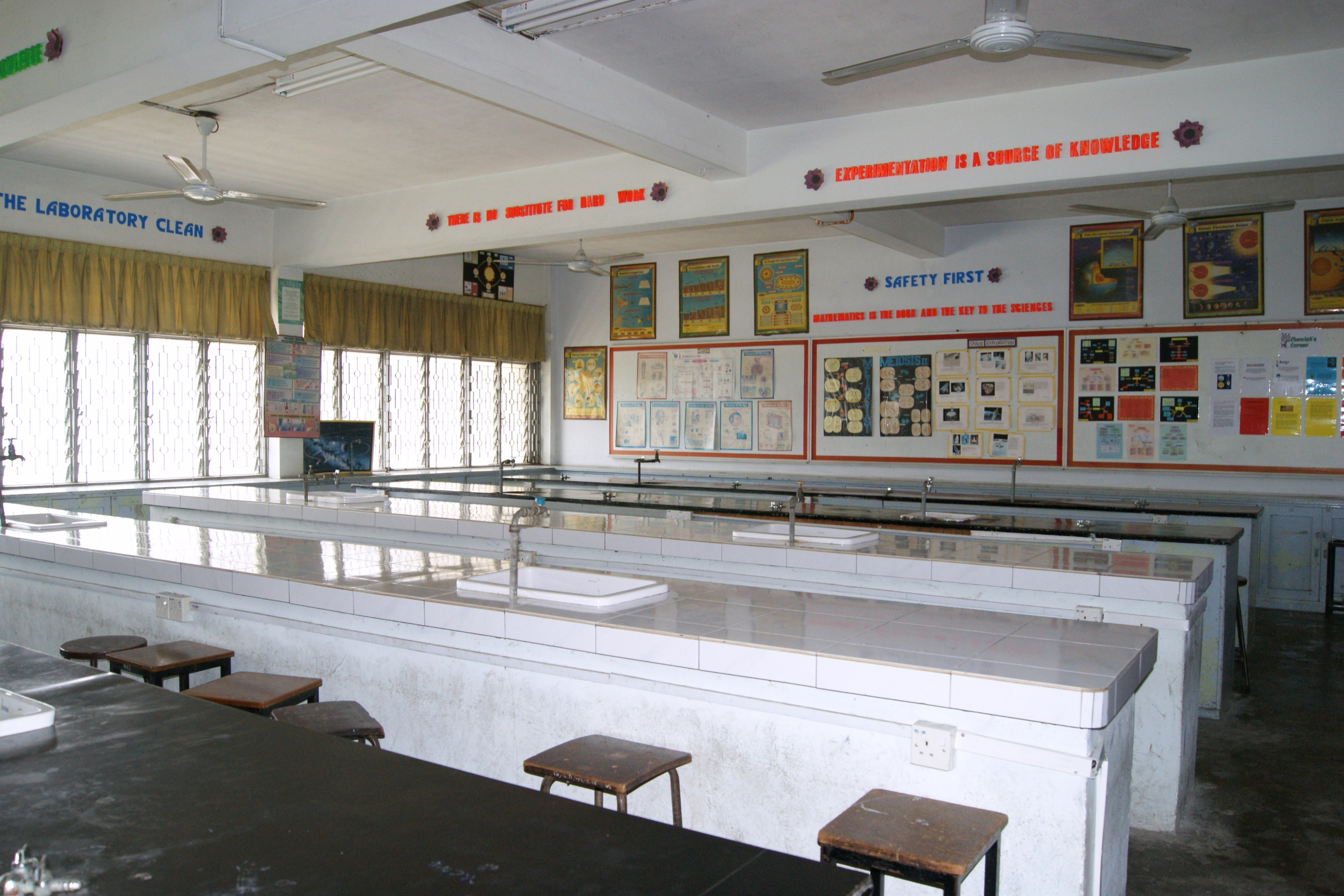
Renovated Science Lab I

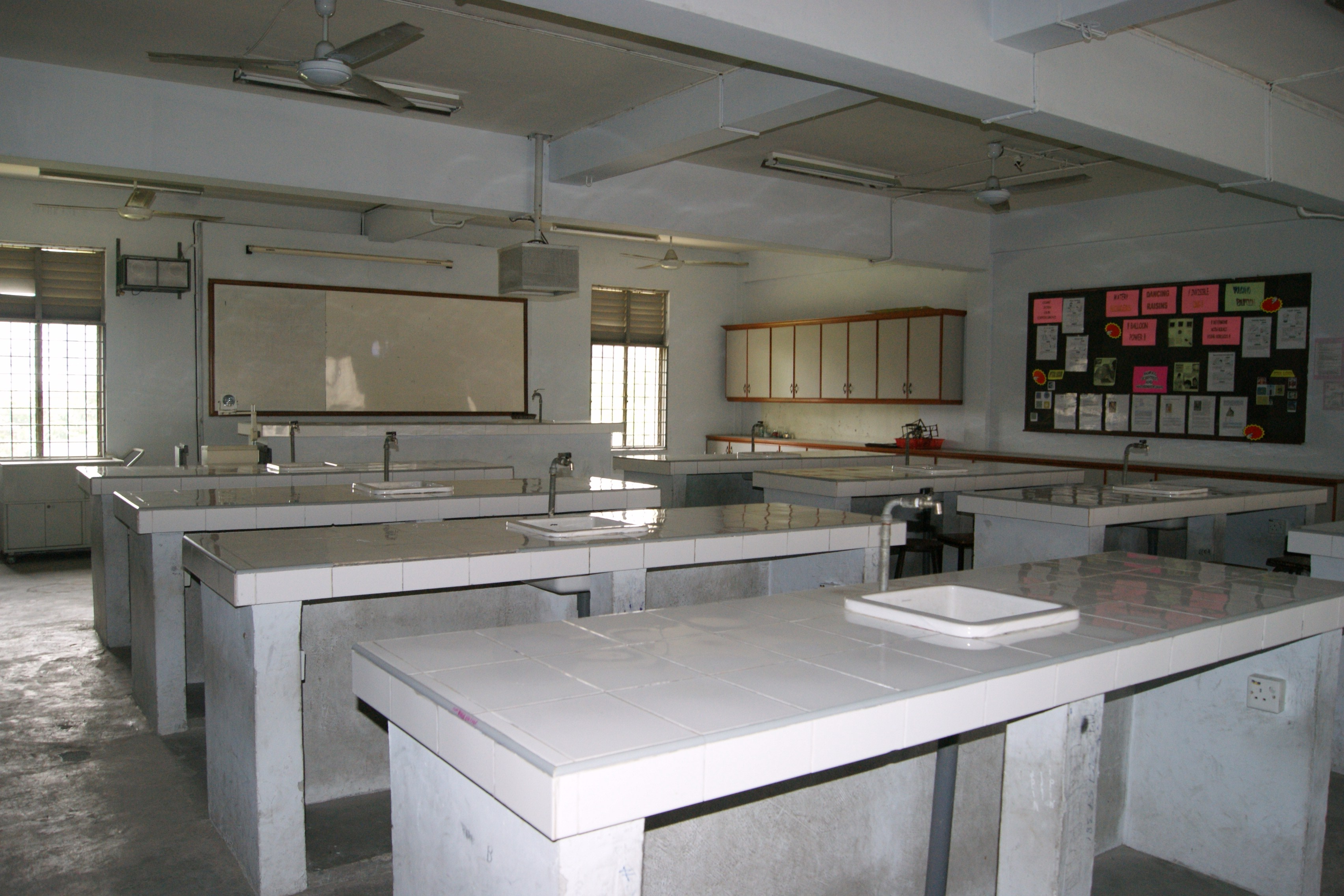
Renovated Science Lab II

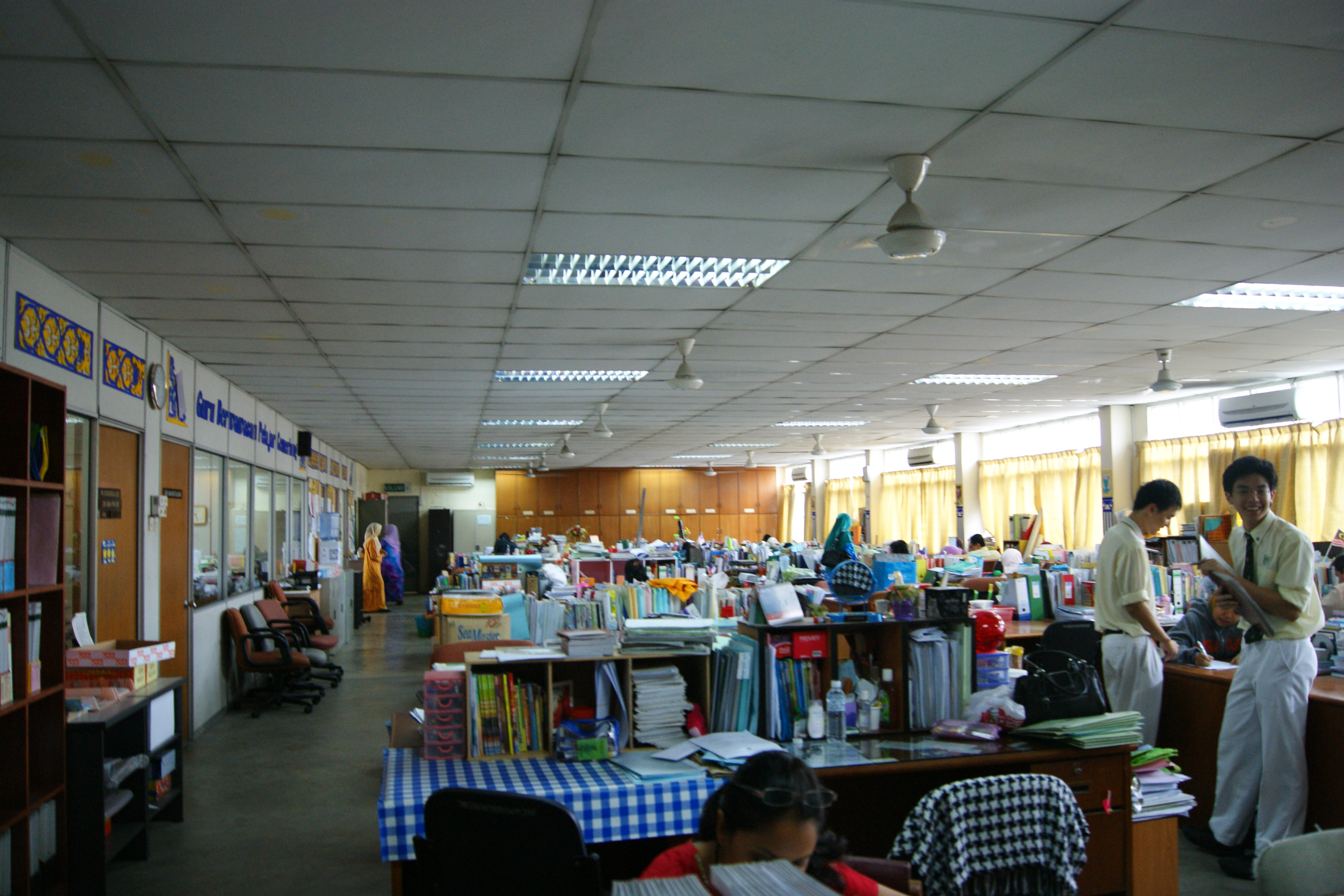
Teacher's Room with air-conditioners

In 2007, the school Co-operative was formed, named "Koperasi Sekolah Menengah Kebangsaan Laki-laki Bukit Bintang Berhad". The original business centre was set up at the previous counselling room. In 2008, it was moved to the room behind the Canteen Area (earlier the Music Room). The shareholders of the Co-operative are students and teachers. The products sold are mostly stationery and books, but now have included buns and ice-cream. After the Government announced that free textbooks would be given to all students, the Co-operative took over the role of school bookshop.

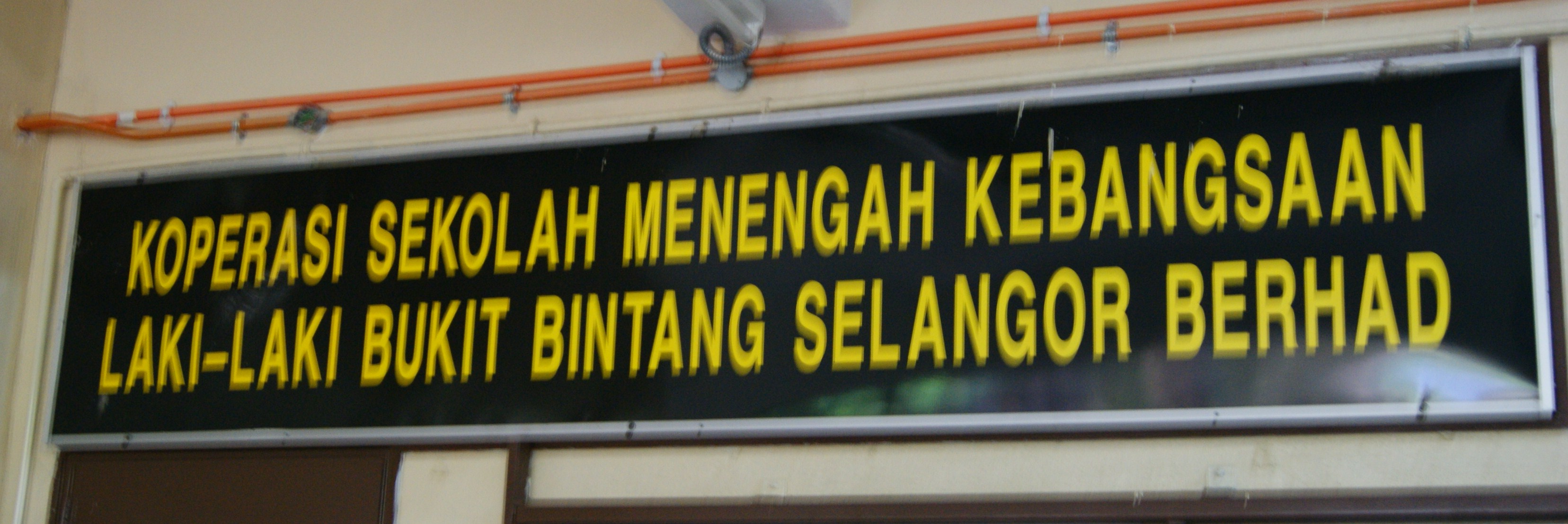
Co-operative signboard

In 2008, the road from the main gate to the squash complex was tarred. A new Computer Laboratory was made in the same year, with 30 computers that were donated by the public. The Computer Lab had earlier occupied the Auditorium, now occupy the room which was formerly the Snooker Room. A new Teacher's Cafe, a lounge for Teachers, was unveiled on Graduation Day in August 2009, in the presence of Madam Sharon Kang, the main sponsor. A new wall was built around the Squash Complex. Towards the end of the school year, with contributions from an ex-BBian, a gymnasium was installed in one of the Squash Complex classes.

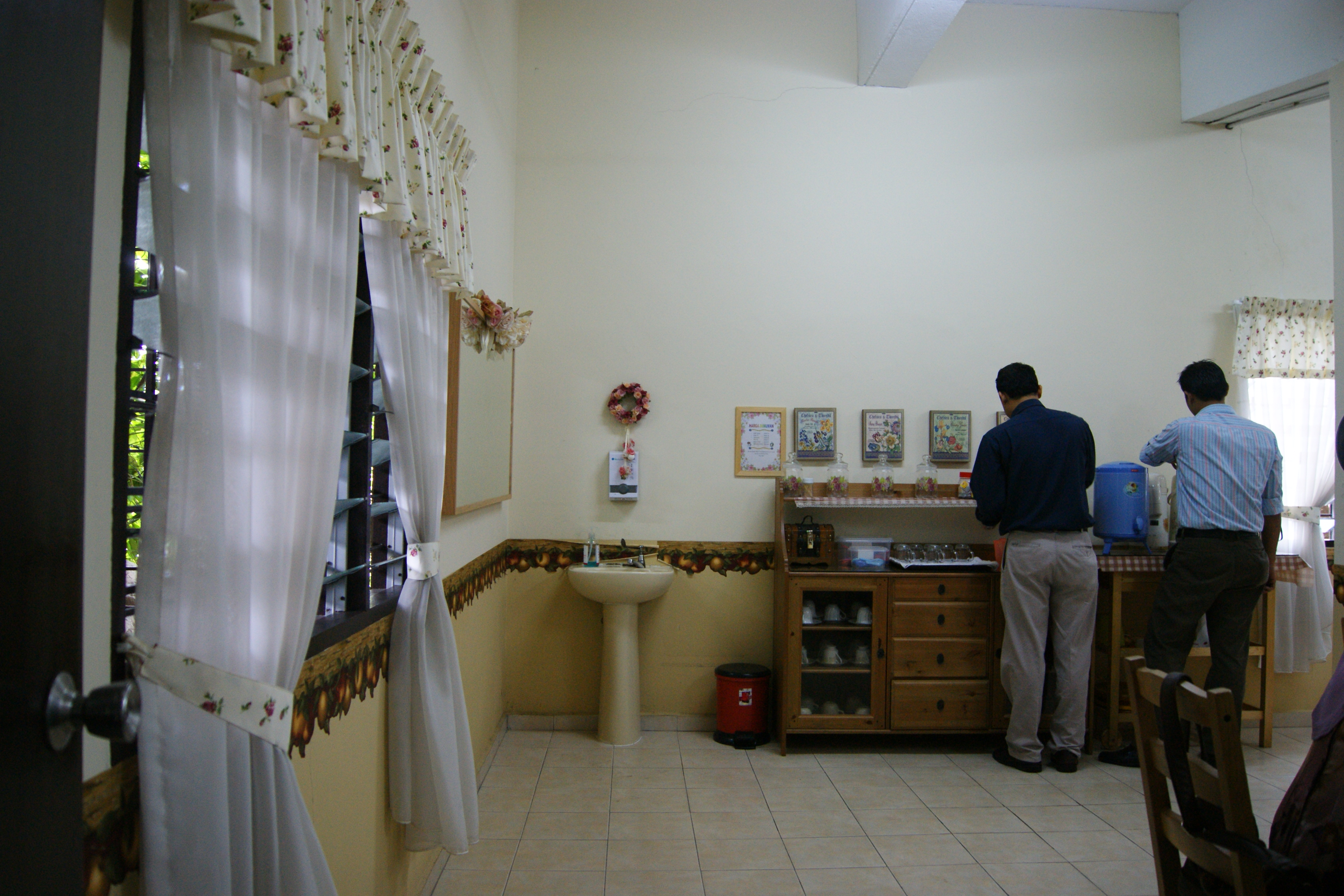
Inside the cafe I

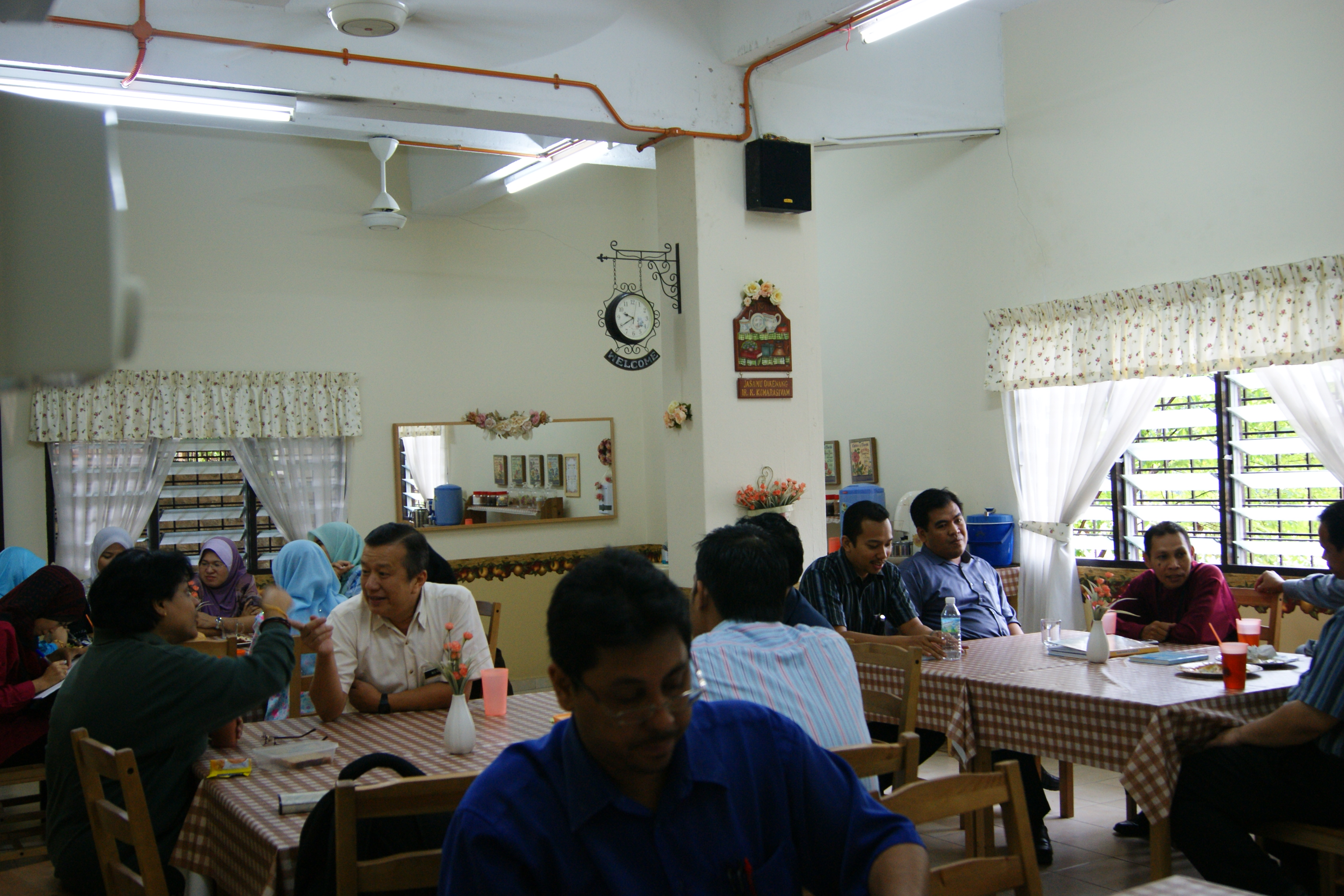
Inside the cafe II

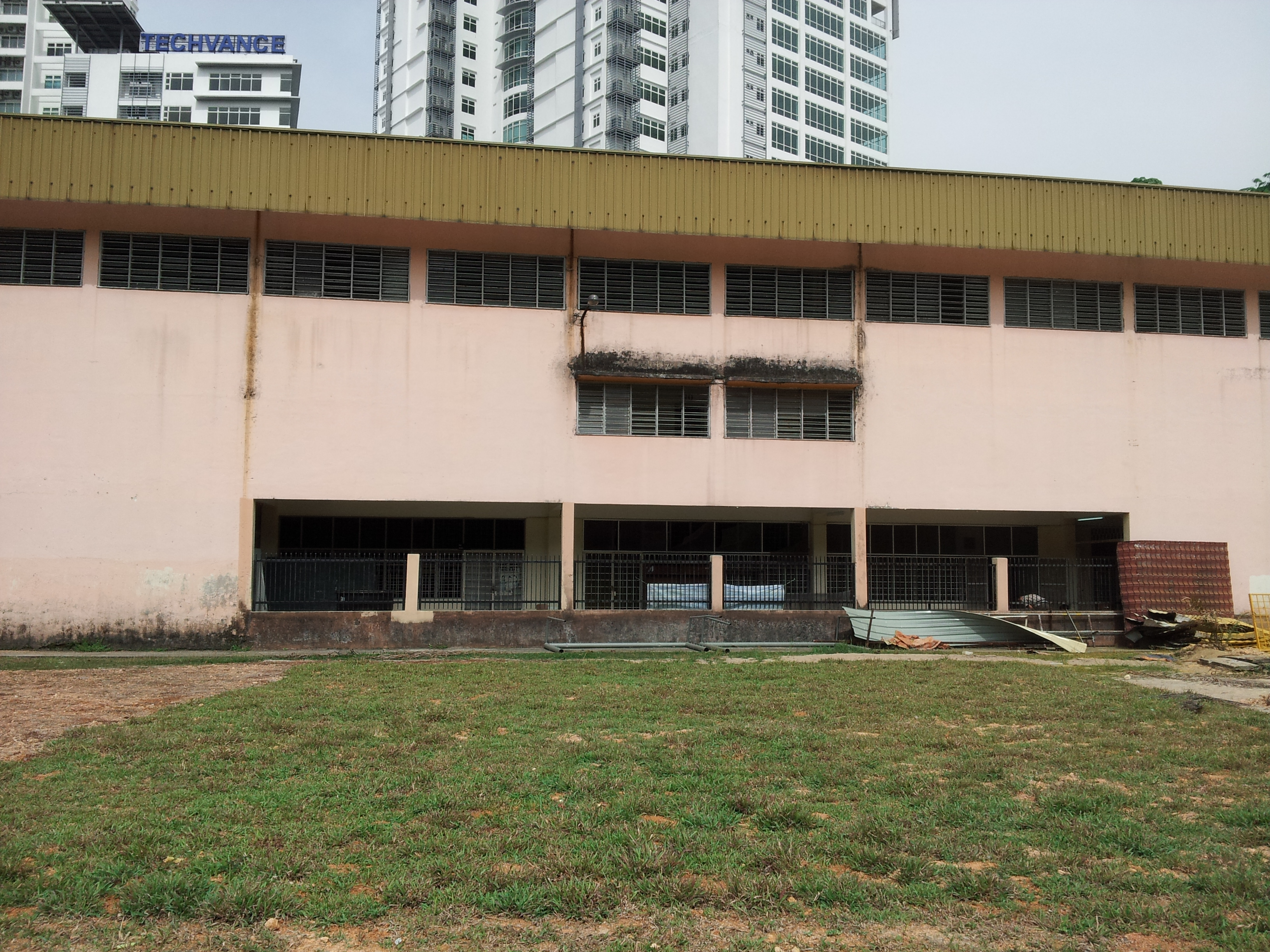
Squash area wall in 2013

In 2010, the old wiring system of the school was rewired and seven air-conditioners were installed in the Dewan McGregor. The stairs from the front of the Badminton Hall to the Canteen were upgraded, as were the stairs from the Canteen to the field.

In 2011, the auditorium was renovated, replacing the carpet flooring with newer flooring.

In 2013, the Dewan McGregor was renovated to fix its collapsing ceiling and to renovate the floor with new tiles. The girls' toilet was renovated, reducing the number of cubicles to make space for a new room. The area outside the Badminton Hall was renovated to fix the cracking pavements, and also to install new shades for the covered walkway. The school canteen was renovated to new floor and pillar tiles, and wooden seats were added to previously bare metal benches. The Squash Complex also was renovated in this year. The field and Kemahiran Hidup (KH) Labs are undergoing upgrading works.

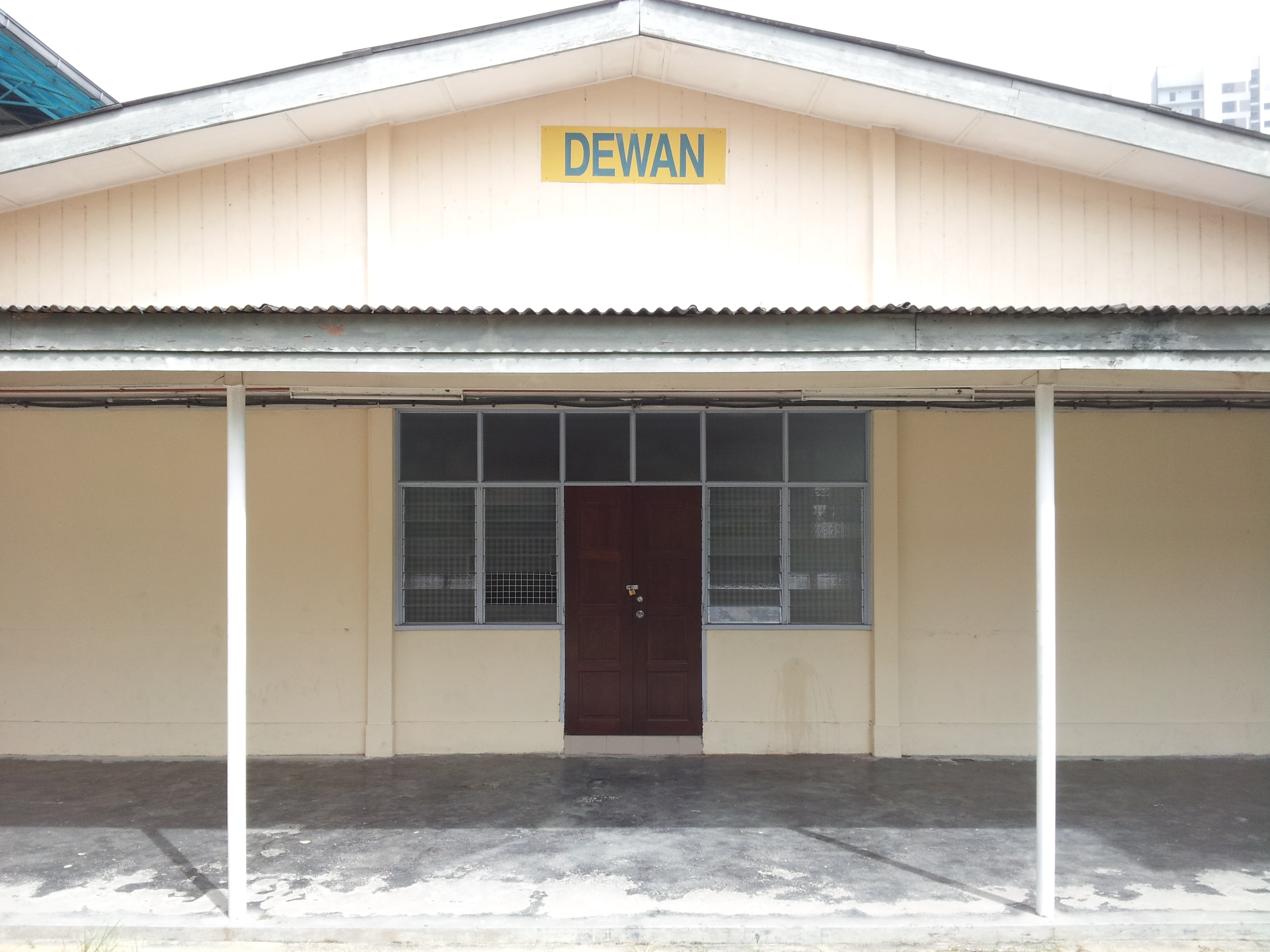
Dewan McGregor in 2013

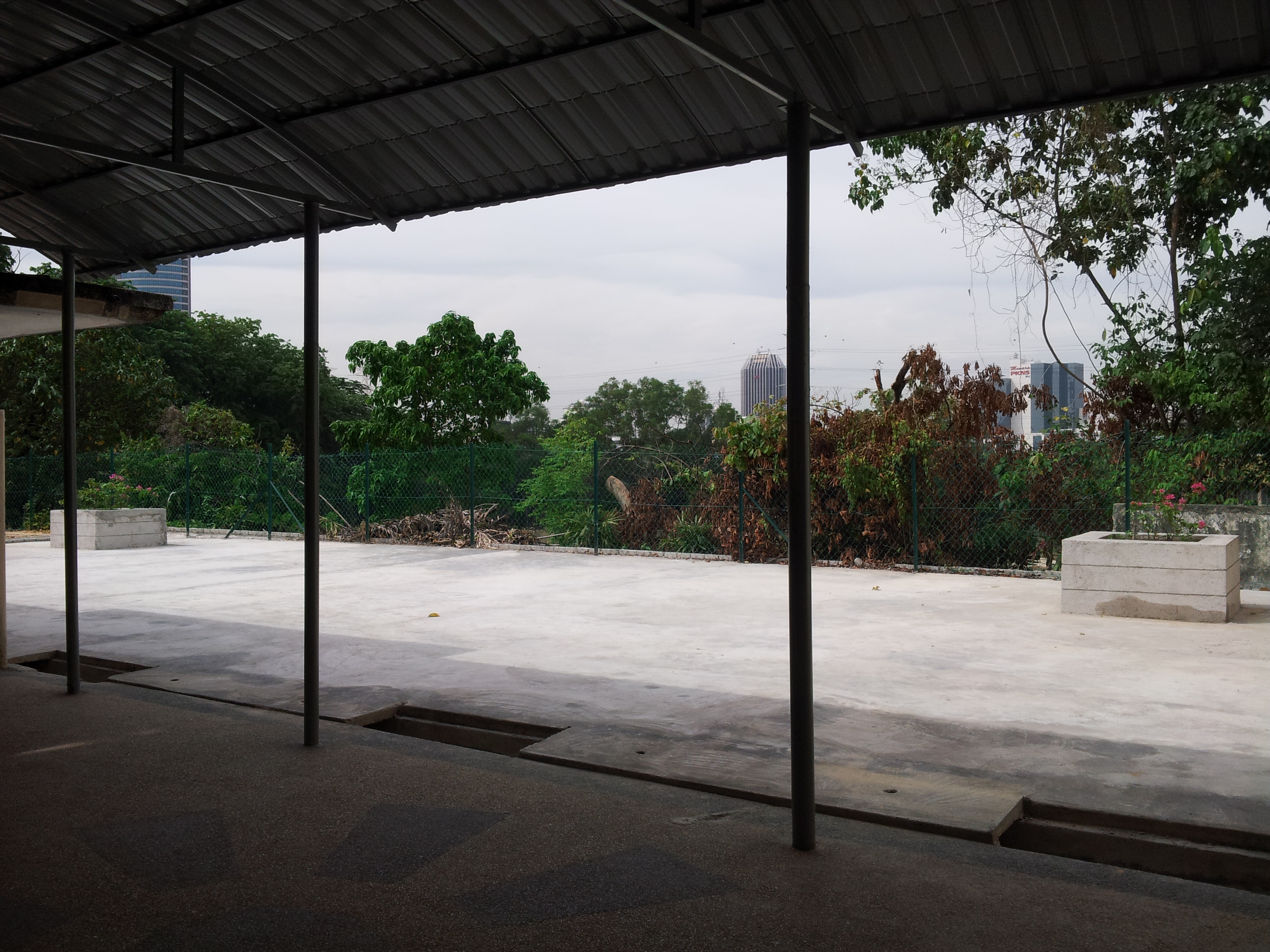
Area outside Badminton Hall I

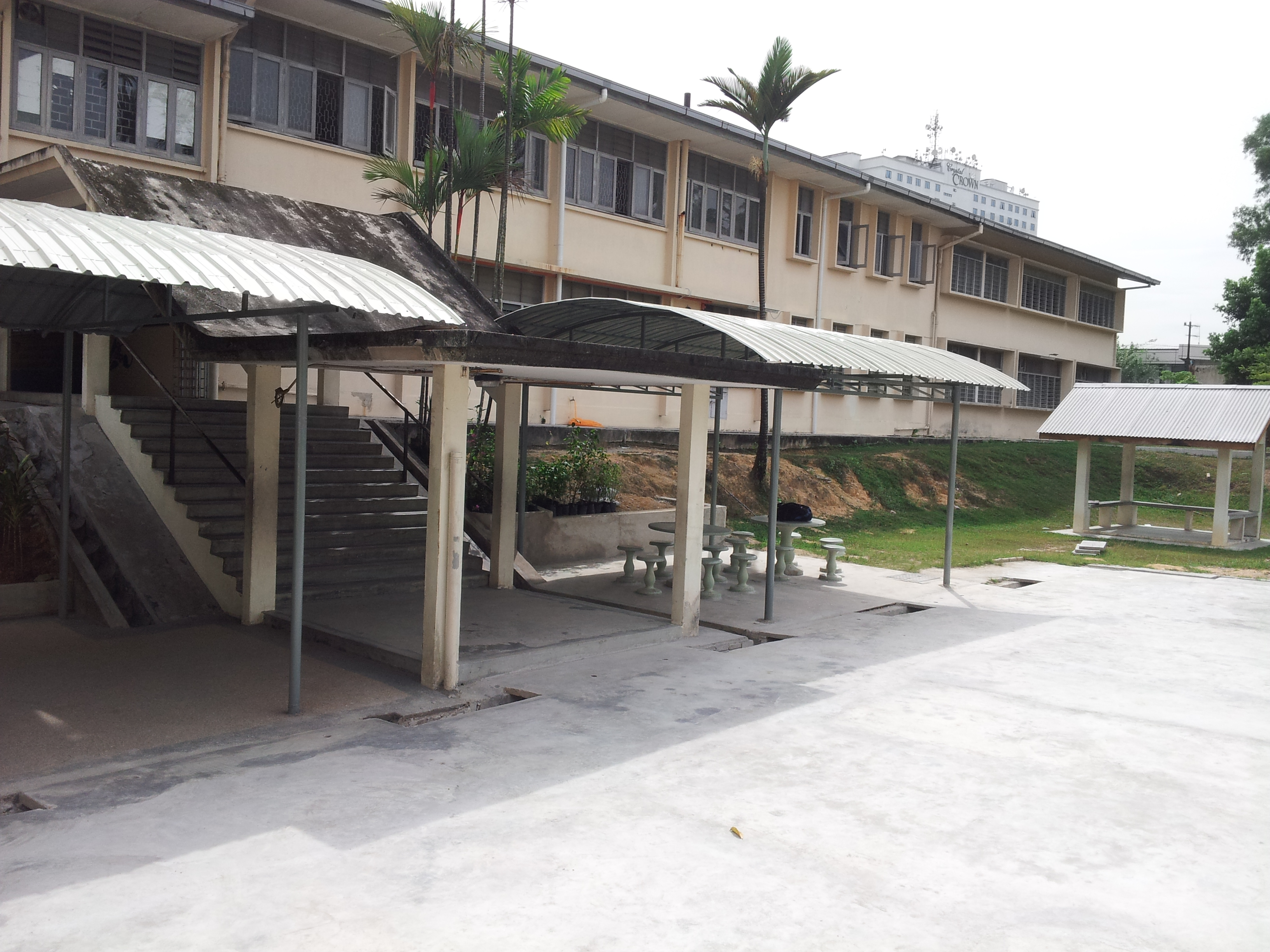
Area outside Badminton Hall II

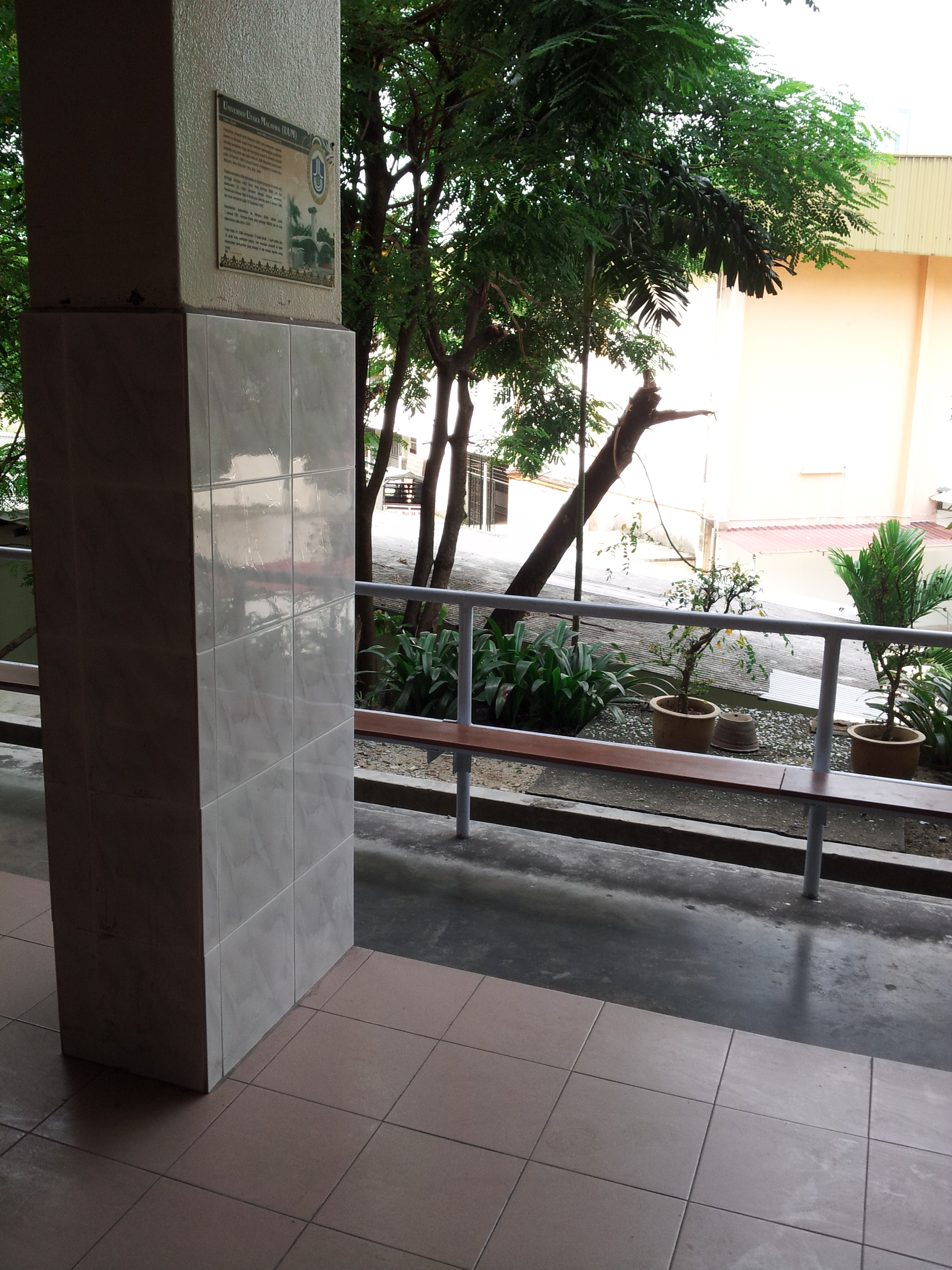
School Canteen after upgrade

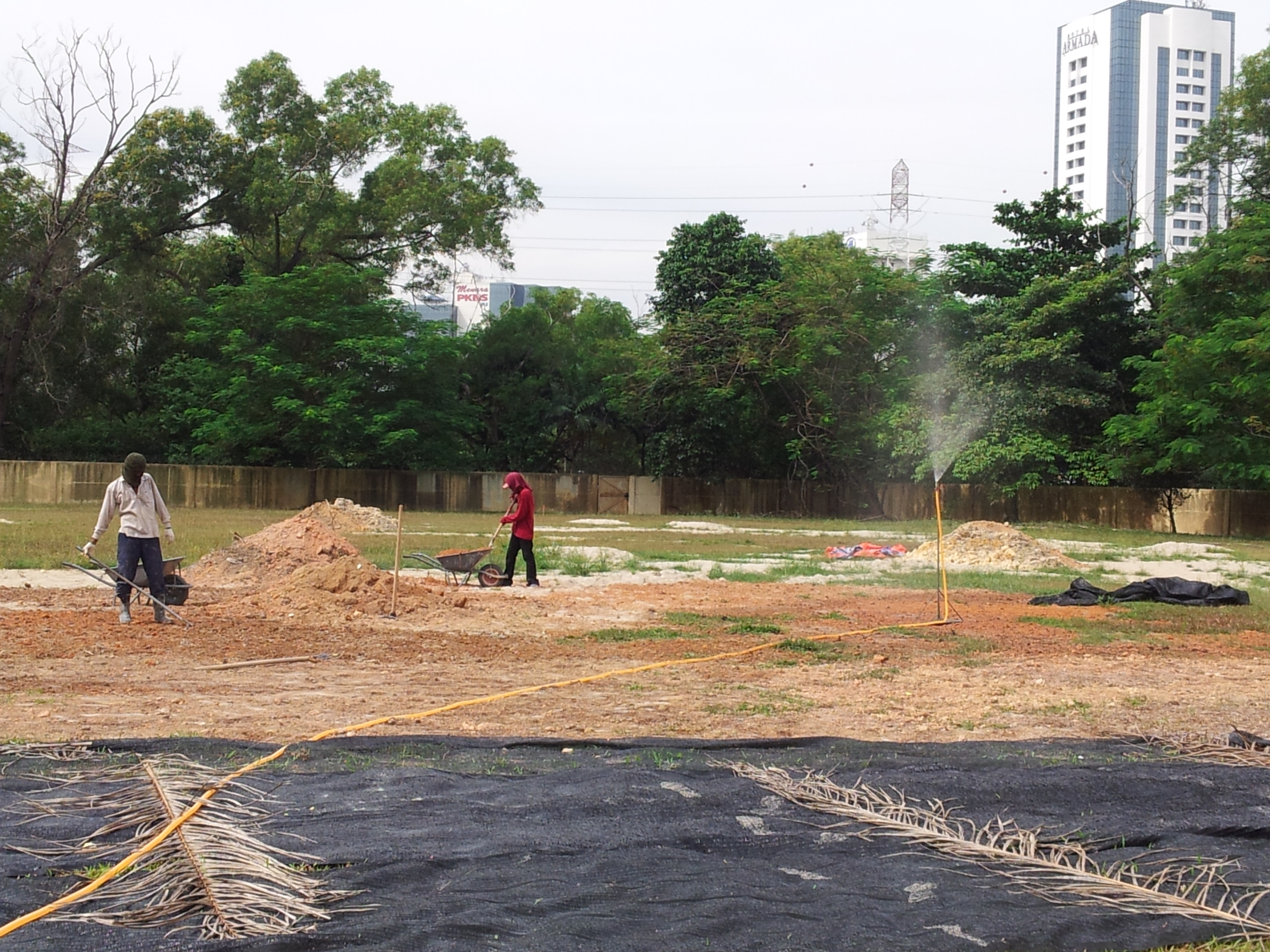
Works in progress in field during June 2013

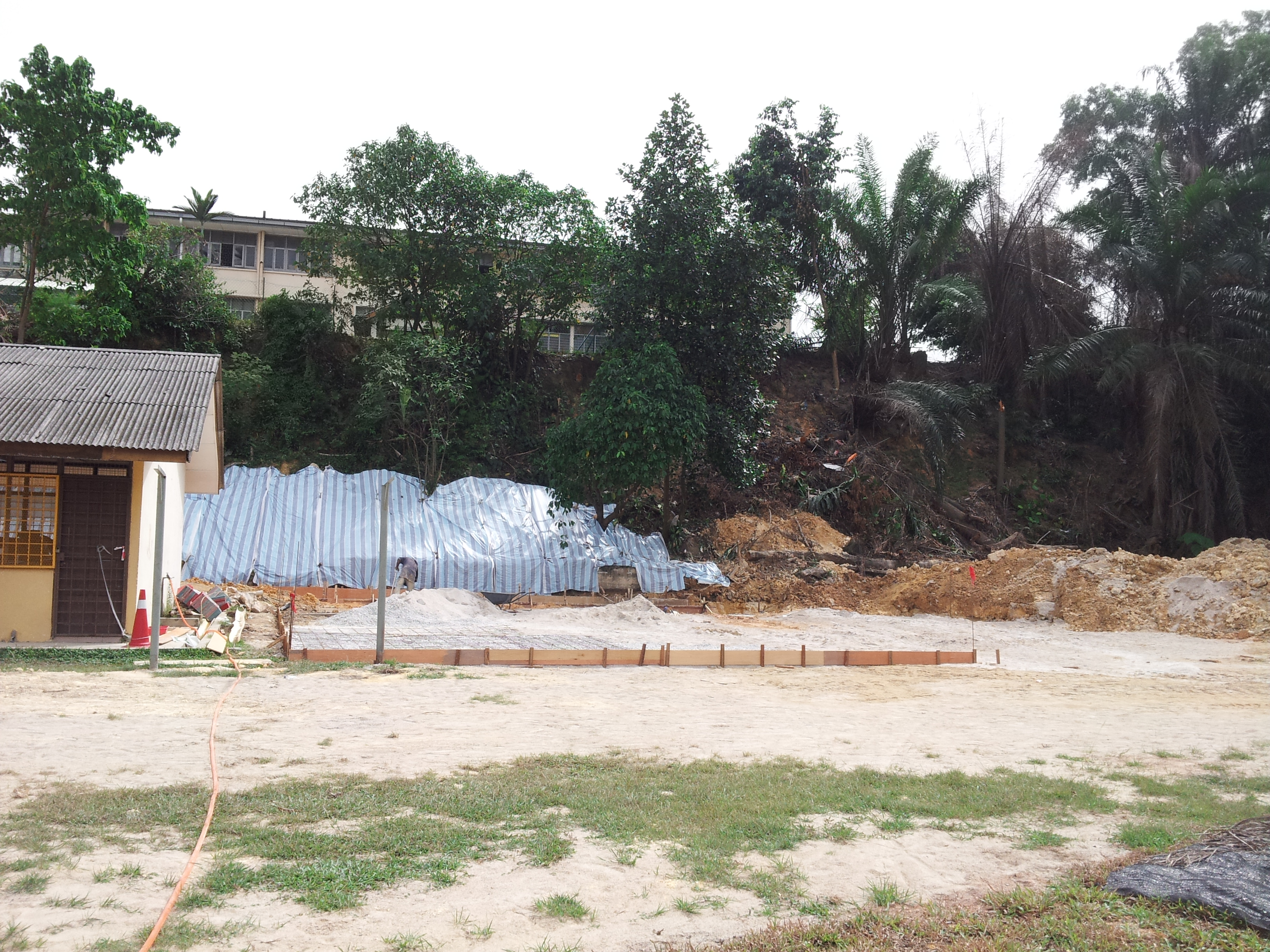
Works in progress beside KH Labs during June 2013

=== Largest squash court complex in Petaling Jaya ===
In 1985, a project to construct a new canteen and a gymnasium cum squash courts was completed at a cost nearly half a million Ringgit. Students, teachers and parents raised funds over five years from 1981 to 1985. Fund-raising projects such as "Jog-a-thon", Canteen Day and School Fun Fair were conducted during the period. Upon its completion, it produced the largest squash court facilities in Petaling Jaya.

The facilities were one of the first Public-Private Initiatives in Malaysia, when the term was still foreign to all of us. Ms Jacqueline Toh was the brainchild behind the effort. In her memoirs that was pen out in the Bintang '85, the BBBSS school book, she shared her love for squash, and how she has brought squash to BBBSS and then initiated the effort to build the courts. The arrangement was to build-and-use, the private company will be managing the courts after school times and the students will be able to use those courts during schools.

The old canteen was used as a temporary classroom to accommodate the increasing number of students but was eventually demolished. The new double storey block housed a hall upstairs and canteen downstairs. The new school hall also doubled as badminton courts. The batch of students sitting for their 1985 SPM examinations took their examinations in the new hall. Members of the public can rent the squash courts and the badminton hall for their private usage. The squash complex has played host to international tournaments, prominently the Milo All Stars Junior Squash Championship, in which it partners with the MBPJ Squash Complex.

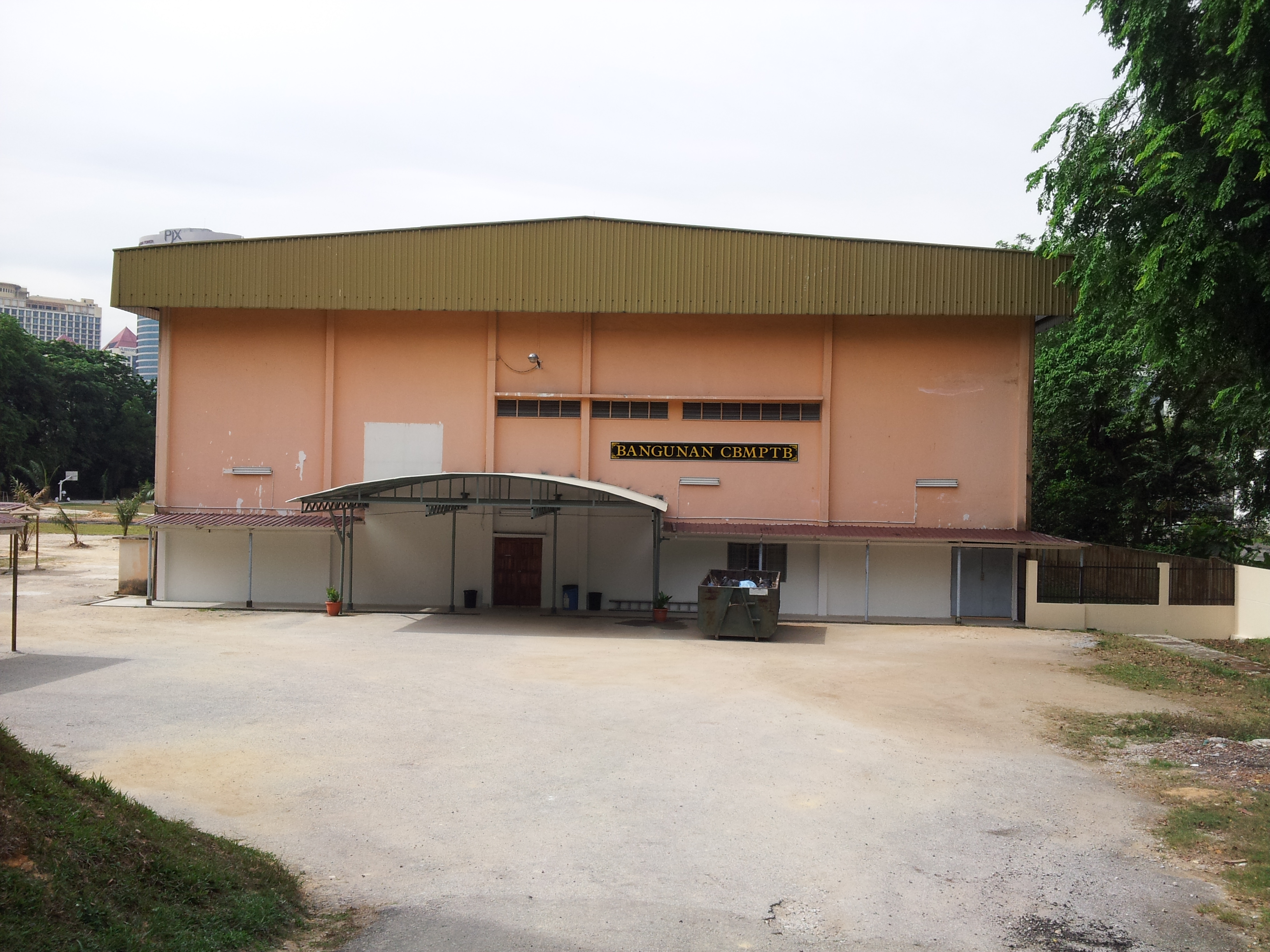
Squash court main entrance (After 2013 renovations)

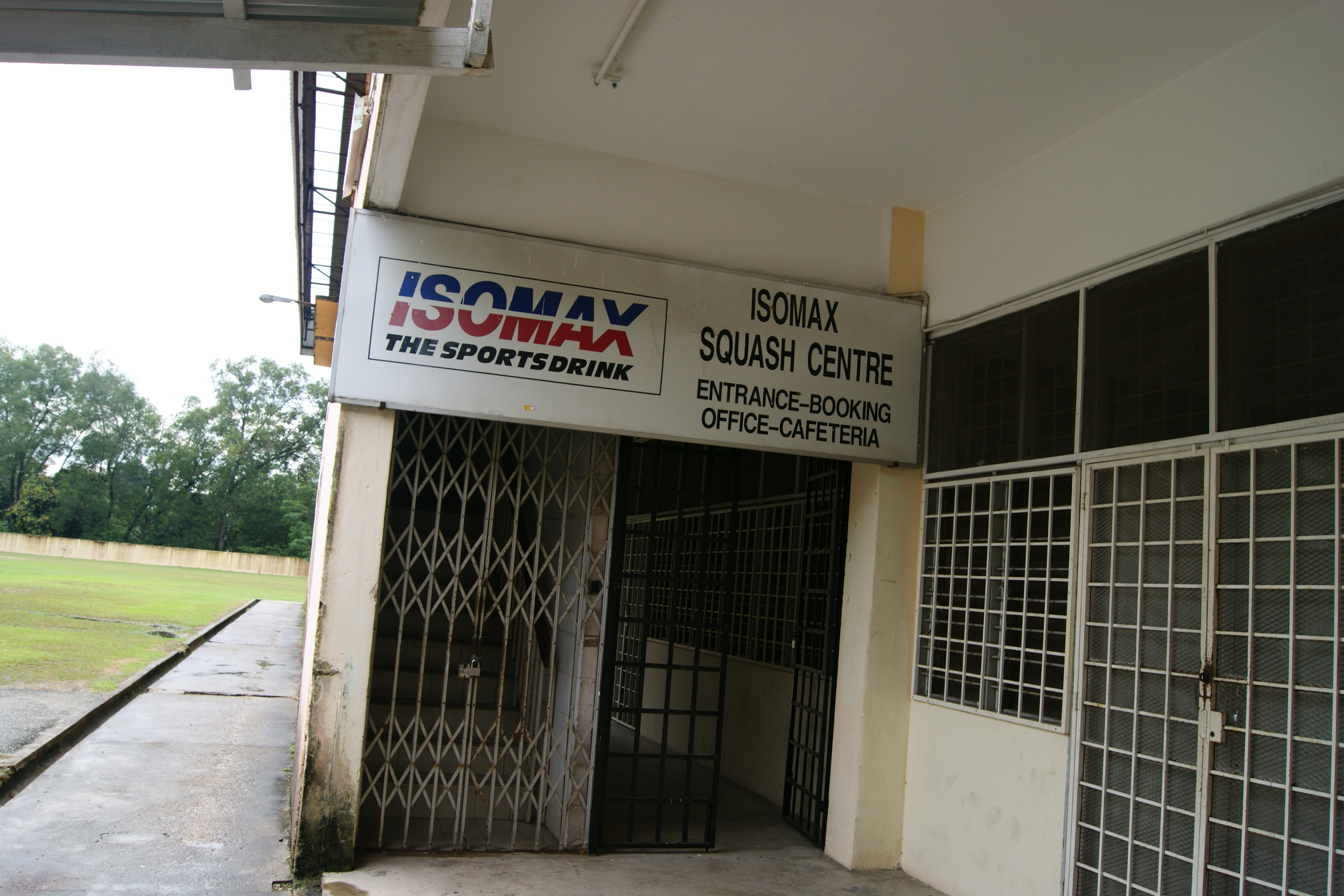
Squash court side entrance (Before 2013 renovations)

== Notable alumni ==
Some notable ex- BBians include

- Tengku Zafrul Aziz, Former Minister of International Trade and Industry (2022-2025) Former Minister of Finance (2021-2022), banker.
- Musa Hassan, 8th Inspector-General of the Royal Malaysian Police
- Acryl Sani Abdullah Sani, 13th Inspector-General of the Royal Malaysian Police
- Jason Leong, Malaysian comedian and former medical doctor
- Altimet, Member of the Selangor MLA for Lembah Jaya, former member of the Teh Tarik Crew group, musician.
- Reshmonu, R&B singer and musician.
- Emmet Roslan Ishak, Butterfingers vocalist and front man.
- Ahmad Zuqarnain Onn, CEO of Employees Provident Fund. Former CEO of Permodalan Nasional Berhad.

== See also ==
- List of schools in Selangor
- List of missionary schools in Malaysia
