= Anglo Chinese School, Kampar =

School in Malaysia

Coordinates: 4°19′01.6″N 101°09′08.1″E

The Anglo-Chinese School in Kampar, Perak comprises Sekolah Kebangsaan Methodist (ACS) Kampar and Sekolah Menengah Kebangsaan Methodist (ACS) Kampar.

The buildings are located opposite each other, linked by an overhead bridge that is rarely used by the students.

== Founding ==
ACS Kampar was founded in 1903 by missionary Rev William Edward Horley. The original building is still intact and being used as a primary school.

== Origin of Name ==
The name of the school (A.C.S.) is actually an abbreviation of the words Anglo-Chinese School. It was so named due to the introduction of public English school education managed by the missionary mainly funded by the local Chinese businessmen. The present school's site was said to be donated by the then tin miner Eu Tong Sen. Similar institutions were established in Ipoh and other major towns. The schools had been from day one open to all Malayan/Malaysian of All Races. Many successful scholars and leaders were produced for the country Malaya/Malaysia and Worldwide, getting top honours throughout the world in both institutions of higher learnings, professions, public institutions, civil services and industries. Following the independence of the then Malaya from the British in 1957, the education system of the nation was revamped altogether. The name ACS was maintained until the 70's. It was unnecessary changed to Sekolah Menengah Methodist possibly due to political pressure.

== Japanese Occupation ==
During World War II, the school was used as the main office for the local Japanese administration in Kampar. Also, the assembly grounds for the ACS Secondary School was used as the execution grounds by the troops. Because of this dark period of time, former students of the school have alleged sightings of supernatural beings. Common claims include sounds of Japanese troops marching and beheaded souls wandering around.

== Centennial Year ==
In 2003, ACS Kampar celebrated its 100 years of excellence in education. The celebration was attended by alumni and current students alike.

== Notable alumni ==
- Datin Paduka Seri Endon Mahmood - late wife of former Prime Minister of Malaysia, Abdullah Ahmad Badawi
- Datuk Seri Mohammad Nizar Jamaluddin - Menteri Besar of Perak
