= SMK Convent, Alor Setar =

Secondary school in Malaysia

Sekolah Menengah Kebangsaan Convent

Location
- Jalan Tanjung Bendahara, 05300 Alor Setar, Kedah, Malaysia

Information
- Type: National secondary school
- School district: Kota Setar

Sekolah Menengah Kebangsaan Convent or Convent Secondary School is in the municipality of Alor Setar, state of Kedah, in Malaysia. It is one of the 30 Convent secondary schools in Malaysia.
