= Mission school =

Religious school

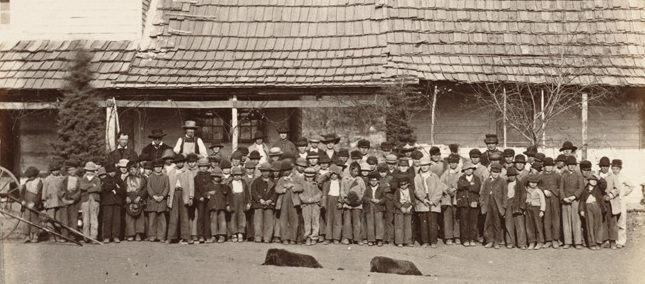
Potawatomi boys at St. Mary's Mission, Kansas, c. 1867

A mission school or missionary school is a religious school originally developed and run by Christian missionaries. The mission school was commonly used in the colonial era for the purposes of Westernization of local people. These may be day schools or residential schools (as in the Canadian Indian residential school system).

Mission schools were established in India as early as the 16th century. They eventually appeared on almost every continent, and persisted in some regions to the late 20th century.

These schools often adopted an evangelical and "heavily denominational" approach to religious education, with the intention of producing new teachers and religious leaders to propagate Christianity among the local population. They also provided academic and vocational training, and usually discouraged the traditional practices of the local people. Mission schools were sometimes government-funded, for example in the US "when Congress felt less inclined to provide the large sums of money needed to establish government schools" to educate the American Indian population.

== See also ==
- List of missionary schools in Malaysia
