= Anglo Chinese School, Sitiawan =

Anglo Chinese School (ACS) Sitiawan

Location
- Jalan Lin Chen Mei; Sitiawan, Perak 32000; Malaysia
- Coordinates: 4°11′48.3″N 100°42′02.7″E

Information
- Established: 1903

The Anglo-Chinese School (ACS) Sitiawan (Malay: Sekolah Menengah Kebangsaan Methodist (ACS) Sitiawan (Secondary) and Sekolah Kebangsaan (ACS) Sitiawan (Primary)), established in 1903 is the oldest and established primary and secondary educational institution located in Sitiawan. Although both shared the same name, the two schools are of separate entity as both have different management that handles both the ACS primary and ACS secondary school's matter.

== History ==
Both the primary and secondary schools shared a similar history. Founded in 1903, the school initially served as an orphanage with just four boys from Singapore. The original building of this school currently is located in Chung Hua Kung Hui (a multipurpose hall located in Kampung Koh). A year later the school's premises were moved to the opposite of Pioneer Methodist Church Sitiawan, which it still stands as of today. Under the leadership of the resident missionary Rev. B.F Van Dyke, it was expanded into a full-fledged school by a succession of missionaries. The school's current name did not exist until it was given by Rev W.E. Horley in 1916, changing its name from Industrial School Sitiawan.

Some of the buildings on the school grounds were built prior to World War II, including the present ACS Primary School Hall and the four classrooms attached to it by a corridor. Construction of the hall began in 1931 by Rev D.P. Coole and completed in 1938. Originally, ACS Sitiawan is an all-boys school like many other ACS speckled around Malaya and Singapore at the time, until the school began accepting female students since 1927. During the Japanese occupation, the school was used as one a Japanese school to teach the Japanese language.

In 1947, ACS Sitiawan began its first School Certificate class. Two years later the first Malay Special Class was carried out. In 1955, ACS Sitiawan for the first time became an examination center for School Certificate Examination. One year after Malaya gained its independence from the British (1958), the primary and secondary schools were separated. The first Form 6 science stream class started in 1973 with a total of 24 students, preparing for the Higher School Certificate (H.S.C) examinations. This first batch had achieved 82% passing rate for H.S.C. examination. In 1977, the school offered arts stream for form 6 after the Methodist High School (MHS) Sitiawan had closed down and ACS Sitiawan recorded the best H.S.C. result in Perak in the same year.

In 2009, the ACS Secondary School Sitiawan had 986 boys and 805 girls, making a total of 1791 students, supported by 123 teachers. As for the primary school in the same year, it had 624 boys and 491 girls, making a total of 1115 students, supported by 69 teachers.

Currently, ACS Sitiawan is one of the largest schools in terms of students enrolment, from standard one to form six and consistently achieving excellent academic results at UPSR, PT3, SPM and STPM levels while having strong extra curricular achievement in various fields, producing alumni with solid background in various industrial as well as academic fields. Its incumbent principal is Dr Siew Chang Yee.

== Academy ==
ACS Sitiawan has ten classes for form 1, 2 and 3 for the Form Three Assessment (Pentaksiran Tingkatan Tiga) (PT3) exam. For form 4 and 5 students who are about to take the Malaysian Certificate of Education (Sijil Pelajaran Malaysia) (SPM) exam, there are nine classes for each form and is generally divided between the science and the arts stream. The science stream consists of two computer science classes, one accounting classes and one economics class. The art stream generally take subjects such as business, visual arts and general sciences.

The school offers form six courses. The pre-university students who are preparing for the Malaysian High School Certificate (Sijil Tinggi Persekolahan Malaysia) (STPM) in ACS Sitiawan will have the option to choose to go for science or arts stream, whereby the science stream comprises one physics and one biology classes while the arts stream have the option to choose a finance class, Malay language class, Chinese language/Visual Arts class and history class. This school is the largest form six education centre in Manjung district and the only two schools that offers form six science streams, the latter being Nan Hwa National Type Secondary School Sitiawan (SMJK Nan Hwa Sitiawan).

As the most prestigious school in Manjung, ACS Sitiawan too offers Chinese, Tamil and German as an initiative to ensure students are able to master at least three languages, in line with the Malaysian Ministry of Education.

== Alumni ==
Among notable alumni of the schools are listed below.

- Alimuddin Mohd Dom - Former Director-General of Education Malaysia
