= Anglo Chinese School, Klang =

School in Selangor, Malaysia

Anglo Chinese School

Location
- Klang, Selangor; Malaysia
- Coordinates: 3.0431°N 101.4407°E

District information
- Type: Semi government-aided all-boys primary and secondary school (Note: The secondary school is almost an all-boys school, with an exception of Form Six, which is coeducational.)
- Motto: Sapienta Potentia Est
- Grades: Primary: Standard 1-6; Secondary: Form 1-6
- Established: 1892
- Governing agency: Methodist Church; Ministry of Education
- Schools: Primary: SRK Methodist ACS Klang; Secondary: SMK Methodist ACS Klang

Students and staff
- Students: Male: Primary (standard 1-6); Secondary (form 1-5); Mixed: Secondary (form 6)
- Colours: Blue; Yellow; White

Other information
- Publication: Primary: Mutiara Budi; Secondary: Pelita Murid
- Website: Official website

Anglo Chinese School (commonly known as ACS) is a semi-government aided primary and secondary school in Jalan Melawis and Jalan Raya Barat respectively within the district of Klang. It is the oldest school in the state of Selangor and one of the oldest in Malaysia. ACS was founded and established on 10 March 1892, and officially opened by Sir William Hood Treacher.

The primary and secondary schools initially functioned together but were separated when enrollment in both schools increased. The primary and secondary schools are now housed in different buildings, separated by a canteen that is located within the primary school and is adjacent to the secondary school. In 2009, a new canteen was constructed for the secondary school.

The school is commonly known in Malay as SRK Methodist ACS (primary) and SMK Methodist ACS (secondary) respectively. Students who have studied or are studying in ACS are known as ACS'ians.

== 1800s ==
In 1800s, the Klang District Officer, Walter W Skeat and Loke Yew encountered obstacles when raising money for a school building. They were finally successful in renting the premises of Penghulu Mohid's house in Jalan Rembau to start the new school. ACS initial enrolment was 14 students, with one teacher. The school was officially opened by Sir William Hood Treacher in 1893.

In 1896, the school became a British public school. The school was later sent by the Episcopal Methodist Mission and it was named Anglo Chinese School in 1915. In 1920, the original building, which was made of wood, was almost completely destroyed by fire.

The following year, a new building was erected at Jalan Raya Barat, its present-day location. It was opened by Oliver Marks, a resident of Selangor. Sultan Alaeddin Sulaiman was also present at the opening of the school. That year, when Reverend Abel Eklund and his wife Ruth Eklund arrived in Klang, there were 15 female pupils in ACS.

=== 1900s ===
On 24 May 1924, Ruth Eklund founded the Methodist Girls' School (MGS), an all-girls school located in the proximity of ACS. In 1922, the first batch of students took the Senior Cambridge Exams. Two years later, the new school magazine, called The School Review, was published. In 1925, The First Klang Scouts Troop was founded.

In 1941, a new building was built to accommodate the increasing enrollment. From 1942 to 1945, during the World War II period, the school became the head office of the Japanese army. In 1951, a new science laboratory was opened by Sultan Hisamuddin Alam Shah Alhaj. The whole school was renovated six years later. During the same year, the first Klang Boys' Brigade was founded with the assistance of Captain Peter Dawson and Reverend Ronald Buttler-White. In 1958, Additional Mathematics, and Pure Sciences, which encompasses Physics, Chemistry, and Biology, were introduced to Form 4 (16-year-old) students.

In 1961, the ACS Old Boys' Association was registered, with Koh Liang Sih as president. In 1963, a new three-storey building was completed. It had 11 classrooms, one office, one teachers' lounge, and one Geography room. It was declared open by Captain Abdul Hamid, the Malaysian Minister of Education. In 1973, the Parent-Teacher Association (Malay: Persatuan Ibu Bapa dan Guru; PIBG) was founded in the school hall. The first chairman was Adam bin Haji Yunus.

A three-storey block with 11 classrooms, and another block of four storeys which houses a teachers' room, an office, and an air-conditioned library were completed in 1978. It was officially opened by Y.B. Dato' Musa Hitam, the Minister of Education of Malaysia at that time. By 1979, new Form Six classes were created.

In 1980, the Report Card Day was introduced, and in 1981, the Mini Canteen day was held for the first time. In 1983, the PIBG raised funds to build a bicycle court, a tennis court, a sepak takraw court, a basketball court and a foyer. Ten years later, a celebration was held to commemorate ACS's 100th anniversary in both primary and secondary schools. In 1997, the name of the primary school was changed to SRK Methodist ACS Klang, while the name of the secondary school remained the same.

=== 2000s ===
In 2006, the nature society club and the school itself faced a major problem, when the trailer used by the club to store collected recyclable items caught fire. The school called the fire department but unfortunately the gates to enter the school compound were locked with heavy-duty chains and a lock pad.

In 2007, ACS Secondary underwent a major refurbishment, including the exterior of the school, along with the classrooms and the corridors being repainted, and the toilet renovated. The fund which has been raised for the renovation is mostly deposited to the person's personal bank account.

In 2018, the secondary school celebrated the 125th anniversary of the school by organising a charity night to raise funds to build a multipurpose sports hall for students to utilise during co-curriculum sessions for sepak takraw, futsal, basketball, volleyball, and badminton among others.

In 2020, both schools shut down due to the COVID-19 pandemic in Malaysia at various time in the year. As such, both students and teachers had to resort to online learning to keep up with their educational semesters, resulting in the semester dates differing from previous years, affecting the national exam that was supposed to be held during the November-December term.

== School buildings ==
In 2009, after the completion of a new canteen for the secondary students, the school was divided into a primary and secondary buildings with a steel gate between both. As such, the classes for each are kept separate from one another.

=== Primary school ===
There are 4 classes in each cohort at the primary school for students between standard 1 and standard 6. Since the school has two sessions: morning and afternoon, each classroom at the school is used by both sessions. There are 12 classrooms in total at primary school. Students are grouped according to academic achievement and placed in the following classes:

- Bestari
- Harmoni
- Kreatif
- Maju

=== Secondary school ===
Classes	Labs & studios	Other facilities
Yakin	Science 1	Library
Gigih	Science 2	Lecture hall
Cergas	Biology	Assembly hall
Azam	Physics	Sport courts & field
Setia	Chemistry	Workshop 1
Budi	Information technology 1	Workshop 2
Jujur	Information technology 2	Surau
Tekun (briefly)	Art studio	Canteen

== Head prefects ==
Year	Name	Ref.
2000	Andrew Foong Jun Li	
2001	Tee Sui Seng	
2002	Lim Khiam Ing	
2003	Mohana Raj Sivasamy	
2004	Lim Chong Teck	
2005	Tan Shang Neng	
2006	Selvandiran Ilanchelian (Ginger)	
2007	Khoo Hau Wei	
2008	Burhanuddin bin Moize	
2009	Nicholas Ng Yi Yang	
2010	Sam Chee Keong	
2011	Muhammad Hisyam bin Abdul Halim	
2012	Kelvin Goh Chun Han	
2013	Yuen Guo Dong	
2014	Arman Liam Sunder Fernandes	
2015	Rishaanthan Shantha Seelan	
2016	Vivek Selvaraju	
2017	Josiah Jeevanraj Joseph	
2018	Sugumaran Thiagarajan	
2019	Justin Khor Lheng How	
2023	Kirubaharan	
2024	Shashwin A/L Chandran	
2025	Abu Backer Siddique Bin Faheem Najib	
2026	Jeevesh A/L Achutan	

== See also ==
- Anglo-Chinese School
- List of schools in Selangor
