= 1948 Birthday Honours =

British government recognitions

The 1948 Birthday Honours were appointments by King George VI to various orders and honours to reward and highlight good works by citizens of the Commonwealth Realms. The appointments were made to celebrate the official birthday of the King, and were published in The London Gazette on 4 June.

The recipients of honours are displayed here as they were styled before their new honour, and arranged by honour, with classes (Knight, Knight Grand Cross, etc.) and then divisions (Military, Civil, etc.) as appropriate.

== United Kingdom and British Empire ==
=== Baron ===
- Colonel Sir Alfred Edward Webb-Johnson Bt., KCVO, CBE, DSO, TD, MB, ChB, President of the Royal College of Surgeons of England since 1941, by the name, style and title of Baron Webb-Johnson, of Stoke-on-Kent in the County of Stafford.
- Sir William Francis Kyffin Taylor GBE, KC, DL, Presiding Judge of the Liverpool Court of Passage, 1931—April, 1948; railway and Canal Commissioner since 1930, by the name, style and title of Baron Maenan, of Ellesmere in the County of Shropshire.
- Thomas Edward Williams Esq, Member of the National Council of Labour. For political and public services; by the name, style and title of Baron Williams, of Ynyshir in the County of Glamorgan.

=== Privy Councillor ===
- Sir Frank Soskice KC, MP, Solicitor-General since 1945, Member of Parliament for Birkenhead East since 1945.

=== Knight Bachelor ===
- Arthur Leigh Bolland Ashton, Director, Victoria and Albert Museum.
- James Raitt Brown, lately Secretary, Ecclesiastical Commission, now Secretary, Church Commissioners for England.
- His Honour Judge Edwin Cooper Burgis, County Court Judge.
- Charles Blake Cochran, Theatrical Producer and Manager.
- Robert Crichton CBE, chairman, West Cumberland Industrial Development Company, Ltd.
- Laurence Rivers Dunne MC, Chief Metropolitan Magistrate.
- Luke Fawcett OBE, General Secretary, Amalgamated Union of Building Trade Workers of Great Britain and Ireland.
- James Raffan Fiddes CBE, JP, Honorary Secretary, Trustee Savings Banks Association. Actuary, Savings Bank of Glasgow.
- Alan Henderson Gardiner DLitt, FBA, Egyptologist.
- Edward Bailey Gillett, Partner in Daniel Smith, Oakley and Garrard, Chartered Surveyors.
- William Gilliatt CVO, MD, MS, FRCP, FRCS, President of the Royal College of Obstetricians and Gynaecologists.
- Arthur Gouge FRAeS, MIMechE, Vice-chairman and Chief Executive, Saunders-Roe, Ltd.
- Clement Thornton Hallam, Solicitor to the General Post Office.
- Charles Robert Harington PhD, FRS, Director, National Institute for Medical Research.
- Geoffrey Heyworth, chairman, Lever Brothers and Unilever, Ltd.
- Cyril Norman Hinshelwood DSc, FRS, Dr. Lee's Professor of Chemistry, University of Oxford.
- Ellis Hunter FCA, Deputy Chairman and managing director, Dorman Long and Company Ltd., Middlesbrough, President of the British Iron and Steel Federation.
- Maurice Inglis Hutton CMG, Head of the British Food Mission to the United States of America.
- David Thomas Rocyn-Jones CBE, ChM, MB, DPH, JP, DL. For public services in South Wales.
- John Graham Larmor. For services to textile production in Northern Ireland.
- Godfrey Way Mitchell, chairman, George Wimpey and Company, Ltd.
- Frank William Morgan MC, General Manager, Prudential Assurance Company, Ltd.
- William Neill FAI, JP, MP, Lord Mayor of Belfast. For public services.
- William Rolfe Nottidge JP, chairman, Kent Education Committee.
- Leo Francis Page. For services to Penal Reform.
- Andrew Herrick Rowell, President of the Institute of Actuaries.
- Alderman Jabez Cliff Tibbits JP. For public services in Walsall.
- Harold Ernest Georges West, managing director, Newton Chambers Companies.
- James Steuart Wilson, lately music director, Arts Council of Great Britain.

Dominions

- The Honourable Norbert Keenan KC, Member of Legislative Assembly, State of Western Australia.
- The Honourable Charles George Latham, Member of the Legislative Council, State of Western Australia.
- The Honourable Justice Herbert Mayo, Senior Puisne Judge of the Supreme Court, State of South Australia.
- John Dudley Giblbs Medley MA, Vice Chancellor of Melbourne University, State of Victoria.
- John Newman Morris CMG, MB, BS, FRACS, Chairman of National Council of the Australian Red Cross. For outstanding services in Red Cross matters and voluntary hospital work in the State of Victoria.
- Gordon Burns Rolph CMG, OBE, Director of The Examiner, State of Tasmania. For services in connexion with the Press and Broadcasting.

Colonies, Protectorates, etc.

- Harold Egbert Allan OBE. For public services in Jamaica.
- Roland St. John Braddell. For public services in Malaya.
- Leslie Bertram Gibson, Colonial Legal Service, lately Attorney-General, Palestine.
- Lo Man Ram CBE. For public services in Hong Kong.
- Harold Francis Cartmel-Robinson CMG, OBE, Colonial Administrative Service, lately Chief Secretary, Northern Rhodesia.

=== Order of the Bath ===
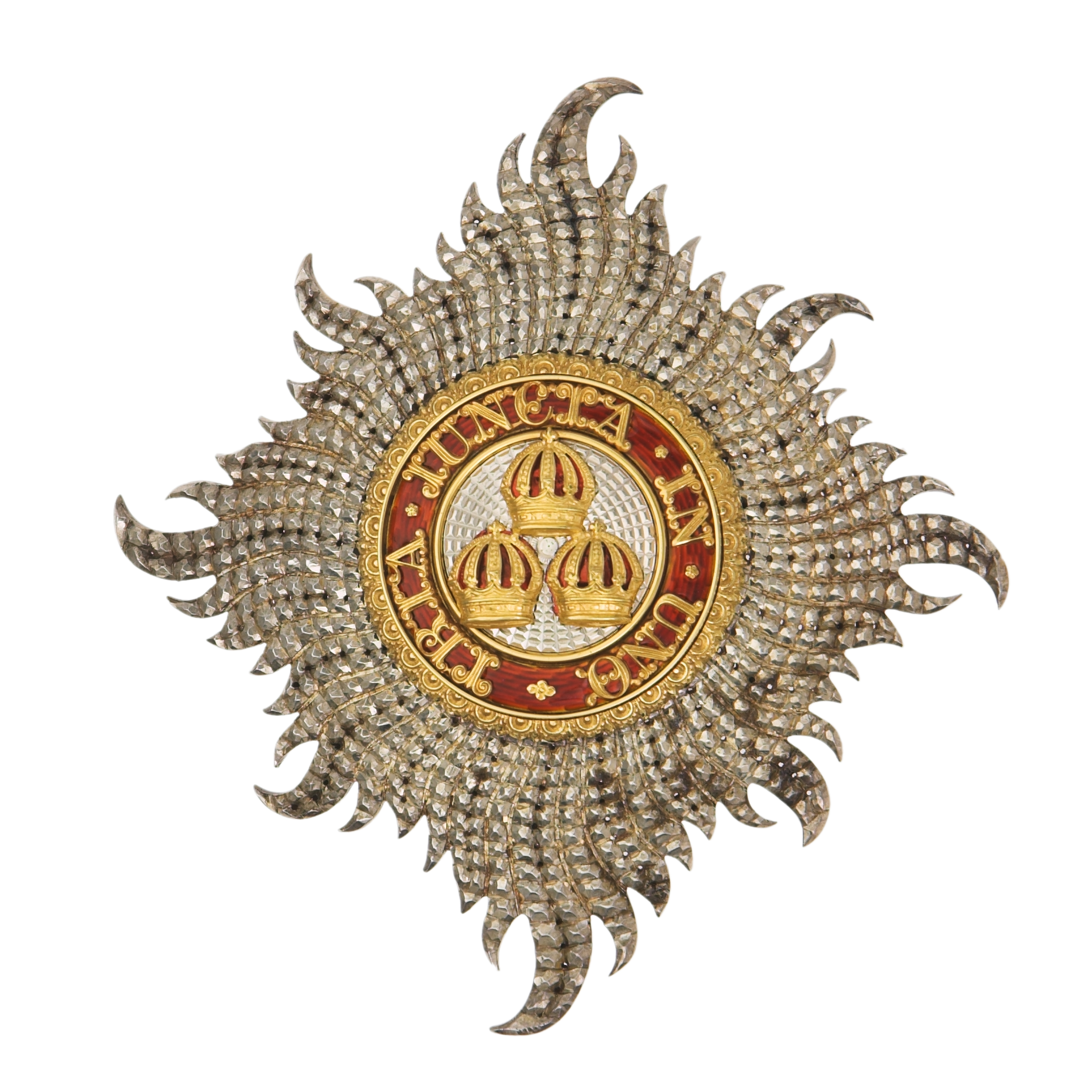
Civilian star of the Knight Grand Cross of the Order of the Bath

==== Knight Grand Cross of the Order of the Bath (GCB) ====
===== Military Division =====
Army

- General Sir John Tredinnick Crocker KCB, KBE, DSO, MC, ADC, late Royal Tank Corps.

Royal Air Force

- Air Chief Marshal Sir John Cotesworth Slessor KCB, DSO, MC, Royal Air Force.

===== Civil Division =====
- Sir Gilbert Francis Montriou Campion KCB, Clerk of the House of Commons.

==== Knight Commander of the Order of the Bath (KCB) ====
===== Military Division =====
Royal Navy

- Vice-Admiral John Maurice Mansfield CB, DSO, DSC.
- Vice-Admiral Ernest Russell Archer CB, CBE.
- Vice-Admiral Denys Chester Ford CB, CBE.

Army

- Lieutenant-General Otto Marling Lund CB, DSO, late Royal Regiment of Artillery.
- Major-General Reginald George Stanham CB, Royal Army Pay Corps.

Royal Air Force

- Air Marshal The Honourable Sir Ralph Alexander Cochrane KBE, CB, AFC, Royal Air Force.
- Air Marshal Sir Leslie Norman Hollinghurst KBE, CB, DFC, Royal Air Force.

===== Civil Division =====
- Brigadier Bruce Atta Campbell CB, CBE, TD, chairman, Territorial and Auxiliary Forces Association for the County of Argyll.
- Sir William Dawson Croft KBE, CIE, CVO, chairman, Board of Customs and Excise.
- Alan Edward Ellis CB, First Parliamentary Counsel.
- Sir William Strang KCMG, CB, MBE, Permanent Under-Secretary of State, Foreign Office (German Section).

==== Companion of the Order of the Bath (CB) ====
===== Military Division =====
Royal Navy

- Rear-Admiral Patrick William Beresford Brooking DSO.
- Surgeon Rear-Admiral Owen Deane Brownfield OBE, MB, BS, MRCS, LRCP, KHP.
- Rear-Admiral Marcel Harcourt Attwood Kelsey DSC.
- Rear-Admiral Gerald Maxwell Bradshaw Langley OBE.
- Acting Rear-Admiral Keith Macleod Lawder OBE, ACIS.
- Rear-Admiral Alexander Cumming Gordon Madden CBE.
- Rear-Admiral The Honourable Denis Crichton Maxwell CBE, MIMechE.
- Rear-Admiral Philip Ruck-Keene CBE, DSO.
- Rear-Admiral Richard Victor Symonds-Tayler DSC.

Army

- Major-General Joseph Aloysius Baillon CBE, MC, late Infantry.
- Brigadier Henry Bainbridge CBE, late Corps of Royal Engineers.
- Major-General Duncan Cameron Gumming CBE, General List (Sudan Defence Force Section).
- Major-General Edward Barrington de Fonblanque CBE, DSO, late Royal Regiment of Artillery.
- Major-General Charles Anderson Lane Dunphie CBE, DSO, late Royal Regiment of Artillery.
- Major-General Stuart Greeves CBE, DSO, MC, Special List (ex-Indian Army).
- Brigadier John Hogshaw MC, late Infantry.
- Major-General Percy George Calvert-Jones CBE, DSO, MC, late Royal Regiment of Artillery.
- Major-General Jeremiah John Magner MC, MB, late Royal Army Medical Corps.
- Brigadier Richard Hobson Maxwell, late Infantry.
- Major-General James Malcolm Leslie Renton DSO, OBE, late Infantry.
- Major-General Cecil Bruce Robertson CBE, MC, late Infantry.
- Major-General William Henry Stratton CVO, CBE, DSO, late Corps of Royal Engineers.
- Major-General Francis Joseph Walsh CBE, Special List (ex-Indian Army).

Royal Air Force

- Air Vice-Marshal Arthur Leonard Fiddament CBE, DFC.
- Air Vice-Marshal Alfred Clifford Sanderson CBE, DFC.
- Acting Air Vice-Marshal Robert Allmgham George CBE, MC.
- Air Commodore North Carter DFC.
- Air Commodore Herbert Francis Fuller CBE.
- Air Commodore John Swire Griffiths CBE.
- Group Captain Geoffrey Ivon Laurence Saye OBE, AFC.

===== Civil Division =====
- Colonel Charles William Dell Rowe MBE, TD, chairman, Territorial and Auxiliary Forces Association for the County of Huntingdon.
- Lieutenant-Colonel Sir Charles Bingham Lowther Bt., DSO, chairman, Territorial and Auxiliary Forces Association for the County of Denbigh.
- Major Gideon Campbell Rutherford, chairman, Territorial and Auxiliary Forces Association for the County of Sutherland.
- Edmund Gerald Compton, Under-Secretary, HM Treasury.
- John Harold Evans, Commissioner and Secretary, Board of Inland Revenue.
- Gilbert Nicolson Flemming, Under-Secretary, Ministry of Education.
- Harry Mason Garner FRAeS, Principal Director, Scientific Research (Air), Ministry of Supply.
- Christopher Frank Good MRCS, LRCP, Principal Medical Officer, Insurance Medical Service, Ministry of Health.
- Edmund George Harwood, Under-Secretary, Ministry of Food.
- Friston Charles How, Under-Secretary, Ministry of Supply.
- Major-General Lindsay Merritt Inglis CBE, DSO, MC, VD, Chief Judge and President of the Court of Appeal, Control Commission for Germany, British Zone.
- Horace John Johns MBE, Under-Secretary, Ministry of Agriculture and Fisheries.
- Norman Boyd Kinnear, Director, British Museum (Natural History).
- Dudley Owen Lumley OBE, Regional Director, London Postal Region, General Post Office.
- James Reid McGregor CBE, MC, Director of Finance, War Office.
- Victor Harry Raby MC, Under-Secretary, Air Ministry.
- Owen Maurice Smith, Under-Secretary, and Accountant-General, Ministry of National Insurance.
- George Foster Stedman MC, Under-Secretary, Ministry of Transport.
- Oliver Thornycroft OBE, FRAeS, MIMechE, Director of Aeronautical and Engineering Research, Admiralty.
- Herbert Brough Usher, Deputy-Secretary, War Damage Commission and Central Land Board.
- Geoffrey Charles Veysey, Under-Secretary, Ministry of Labour and National Service.

=== Order of Saint Michael and Saint George ===
Star of the Order of Saint Michael and Saint George

==== Knight Grand Cross of the Order of St Michael and St George (GCMG) ====
- The Right Honourable Robert Alderson, Baron Wright LLD, lately a Lord of Appeal in Ordinary.

Dominions

- Sir Eric Gustav Machtig KCB, KCMG, OBE, Permanent Under-Secretary of State for Commonwealth Relations, Commonwealth Relations Office (Division A).

Colonies, Protectorates, etc.

- General Sir Alan Gordon Cunningham KCB, DSO, MC, lately High Commissioner and Commander-in-Chief, Palestine.

Diplomatic Service and Overseas List

- Sir Orme Garton Sargent KCB, KCMG, Permanent Under-Secretary of State, Foreign Office.

==== Knight Commander of the Order of St Michael and St George (KCMG) ====
- Lieutenant-General Charles Henry Gairdner CB, CBE, Personal Representative of the Prime Minister of the United Kingdom in Japan.
- James Reginald Carroll Helmore CMG, Second Secretary, Board of Trade.

Diplomatic Service and Overseas List

- William Eric Beckett CMG, KC, Legal Adviser to the Foreign Office.
- Charles Brinsley Pemberton Peake CMG, MC, His Majesty's Ambassador Extraordinary and Plenipotentiary at Belgrade.
- John Monro Troutbeck CMG, Head of the British Middle East Office, Cairo.

Dominions

- The Honourable Albert Arthur Dunstan, Minister of Health, State of Victoria, formerly Premier of Victoria.

Colonies, Protectorates, etc.

- George Beresford-Stooke CMG, Colonial Administrative Service, Chief Secretary, Nigeria, Governor-Designate, Sierra Leone.
- Reginald Thomas Herbert Fletcher, Baron Winster, Governor and Commander-in-Chief, Cyprus.

Honorary Knight Commander

- His Highness Tengku Ibrahim Ibni Al-Marhum Sultan Mohamed IV CMG (Hon.), Sultan of Kelantan.

==== Companion of the Order of St Michael and St George (CMG) ====
- Christopher John Chancellor, General Manager, Reuters Ltd.
- William Henry Gardner, Assistant Secretary, War Office.
- Harold Legat, Assistant Headquarters Commissioner for Oversea Boy Scouts, and Migration.
- Henry John Bevis Lintott, Under-Secretary, Board of Trade.
- Frank Frewin Pinnock, Overseas Supplies Commissioner, Ministry of Food.
- Walter Simon, lately Assistant Secretary, HM Treasury.
- Henry Stevens OBE, lately Industrial Adviser to the Government of Turkey; now Regional Controller, East and West Ridings Region, Ministry of Labour and National Service.
- Percy Stocks MD, BCh, FRCP, DPH, Chief Statistician (Medical), General Register Office.

Diplomatic Service and Overseas List

- William Nimmo Allan, until recently Director of Irrigation, Sudan Government.
- Edwin Arthur Chapman-Andrews OBE, Minister at His Majesty's Embassy in Cairo.
- Roderick Edward Barclay, Head of the Personnel Department of the Foreign Office.
- David Hugh Montgomerie Boyle, attached to a Department of the Foreign Office.
- Alan Alves Dudley, Head of the Information Policy Department of the Foreign Office.
- John Bewley Greaves OBE, until recently Counsellor (Commercial) at His Majesty's Embassy at Washington (now United Kingdom Senior Trade Commissioner in Australia).
- Edgar James Joint OBE, Counsellor (Commercial) at His Majesty's Embassy in Brussels.
- John Walter Nicholls OBE, Head of the German Trade Department of the Foreign Office.
- Harold Couch Swan OBE, His Majesty's Consul-General at Genoa.

Dominions

- Joseph John Saville Garner, An Assistant Secretary in the Commonwealth Relations Office, lately serving as Deputy High Commissioner for the United Kingdom in Canada.
- William John Jungwirth, Permanent Head of Premier's Department, State of Victoria.
- The Honourable Alexander Hugh Panton, Speaker of the Legislative Assembly and formerly Minister of the Crown, State of Western Australia.
- Louis Laybourne Smith. For public services as an Architect in the State of South Australia.
- Alexander Colin Burlington Symon OBE, Deputy High Commissioner for the United Kingdom in India.

Colonies, Protectorates, etc.

- William Addis, Colonial Administrative Service, Colonial Secretary, Bermuda.
- Wilfred Joseph Bigg, Assistant Secretary, Colonial Office.
- John Cecil Rankin Buchanan MD, FRCP, Colonial Medical Service, Director of Medical Services, Fiji, and Inspector-General, South Pacific Health Service.
- Charles Tunstall Evans, Colonial Administrative Service, lately Senior District Commissioner, Palestine.
- Thomas Victor William Finlay, Colonial Police Service, Commissioner of Police, Nigeria.
- Colonel William Nicol Gray DSO, lately Inspector-General of Police, Palestine.
- Edwin Frank McDavid CBE, Colonial Treasurer, British Guiana.
- Henry Steven Potter, Colonial Administrative Service, Financial Secretary, Uganda.
- John Owen Sanders MIT, AMICE, General Manager, Malayan Railway.
- Duncan George Stewart, Colonial Administrative Service, lately Financial-Secretary, Palestine.
- Harold Haydon Storey DSc, FRS, Secretary to the Colonial Agricultural Research Committee.
- John Frederick George Troughton MBE, Colonial Administrative Service, Financial Secretary and Member for Finance, Kenya.

Honorary Companion

- His Highness Syed Putra ibni Almarhum Syed Hassan Jamalullail, Raja of Perlis, Federation of Malaya.

=== Royal Victorian Order ===
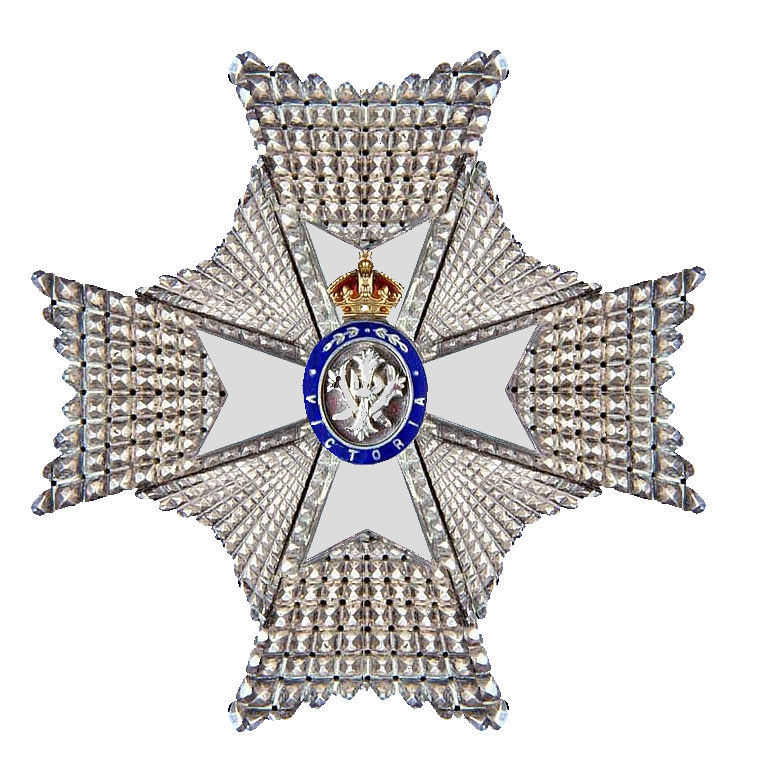
Insignia of a Knight / Dames Commander of the Royal Victorian Order

==== Knight Grand Cross of the Royal Victorian Order (GCVO) ====
- Sir James Ulick Francis Canning Alexander KCB, KCVO, CMG, OBE.
- Lieutenant-Colonel The Honourable Sir Piers Walter Legh KCVO, CMG, CIE, OBE.

==== Knight Commander of the Royal Victorian Order (KCVO) ====
- Commander Jameson Boyd Adams CVO, CBE, DSO, Royal Naval Reserve (retired).
- Walter Leslie Farrer.
- Lieutenant-Colonel Louis William Howard Kerr CMG, CVO, OBE.
- Arthur Noel Mobbs OBE.

==== Commander of the Royal Victorian Order (CVO) ====
- Cecil Gerald Graham Dandridge.

==== Member of the Royal Victorian Order (MVO) ====
At this time the two lowest classes of the Royal Victorian Order were "Member (fourth class)" and "Member (fifth class)", both with post-nominal letters MVO. "Member (fourth class)" was renamed "Lieutenant" (LVO) from the 1985 New Year Honours onwards..

Fourth Class

- Major Thomas Samuel Chandler LRAM, ARCM, Welsh Guards (retired), Director of Music.
- Frank Harvey Evans MVO.
- Henry George Pinnock MVO.
- John Richard Charles Rotton.
- Lawrence Edward Tanner MVO, MA, FSA.

Fifth Class

- Regimental Sergeant-Major Arthur John Brand MBE, late Grenadier Guards.
- Frederick James Dadd Ronald John Hill MBE.
- John Pillar.
- Charles Minto Roberts.
- Arthur Frederick Abbott Stamberg.

=== Order of the British Empire ===
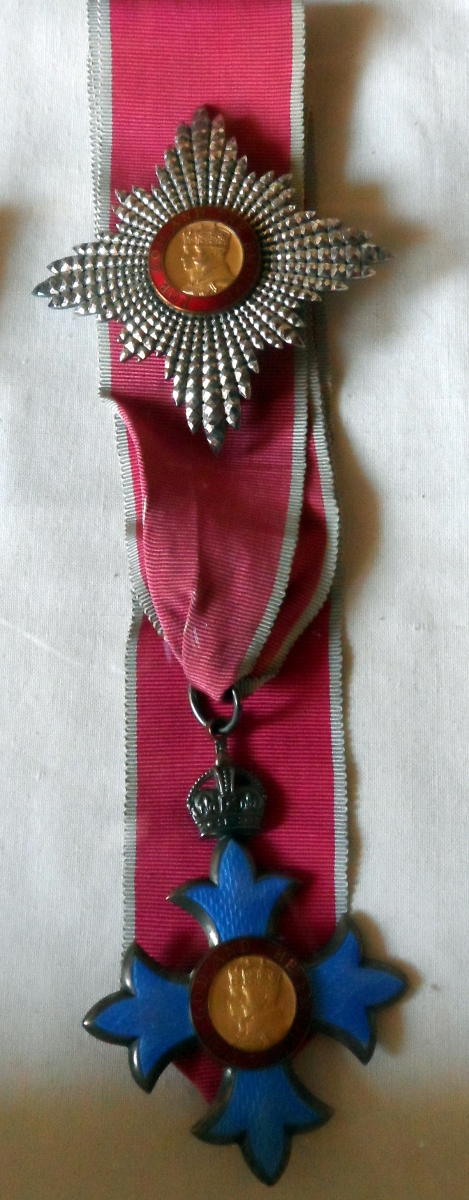
Insignia of a Knight Commander of the Order of the British Empire

==== Knight Grand Cross of the Order of the British Empire (GBE) ====
===== Civil Division =====
Diplomatic Service and Overseas List.

- Sir Reginald Wildig Allen Leeper KCMG, CBE, His Majesty's Ambassador Extraordinary and Plenipotentiary at Buenos Aires.
- Sir (Eubule) John Waddington, KCMG, KCVO, OBE, lately Governor and Commander-in-Chief, Northern Rhodesia.

==== Dame Commander of the Order of the British Empire (DBE) ====
===== Civil Division =====
- Evelyn Adelaide Sharpe, Deputy Secretary, Ministry of Town and Country Planning.

==== Knight Commander of the Order of the British Empire (KBE) ====
===== Military Division =====
Royal Navy

- Vice-Admiral Claud Barrington Barry CB, DSO.

Army

- Lieutenant-General Francis Robert Roy Bucher CB, OBE, MC, Special List (ex-Indian Army).

Royal Air Force

- Air Vice-Marshal Alan Filmer Rook CB, OBE, FRCP, MRCS, DPH, KHP.
- Acting Air Commodore Frank Whittle CB, CBE.

===== Civil Division =====
- Major Sir Jack Benn Brunel Cohen, chairman, National Advisory Council on the Employment of the Disabled.
- Henri Nicolas de Villiers, Deputy Secretary, Ministry of Works.
- Sir Hector James Wright Hetherington LLD, DL, Principal and Vice-Chancellor of Glasgow University.
- Michael Henry Braddon Nethersole CSI, CIE, DSO. For public services.
- Sir Alan Rae Smith OBE, FCA, Financial Adviser to the Ministry of Transport Partner In Deloitte Plender Griffiths and Company.
- Reginald Ramson Whitty CBE, Public Trustee.
- Arton Wilson CB, Permanent Secretary, Ministry of Pensions.

Diplomatic Service and Overseas List

- Alwyne George Neville Ogden CMG, OBE, until recently His Majesty's Consul-General at Shanghai.
- Alexander Theodore Newboult, CMG, MC, ED, Colonial Administrative Service, Chief Secretary, Federation of Malaya.

==== Commander of the Order of the British Empire (CBE) ====
===== Military Division =====
Royal Navy

- Captain Stuart Latham Bateson.
- Captain Alfred Charles Dewar OBE, BLitt, (Retired).
- Surgeon Captain Frederick George Hunt MB, BCh.
- Engineer Captain William Thomas Arthur Jordan OBE, (Retired).
- Superintendent Mary Beatrice Rundle, Women's Royal Naval Service.
- Colonel Richard William Spraggett MC, Royal Marines.

Army

- Colonel Eric Gilmour Brown, Royal Army Ordnance Corps.
- Brigadier Denys Herbert Vincent Buckle OBE, late Royal Army Service Corps.
- Brigadier David Henry Cole OBE, MA, LittD, Royal Army Educational Corps.
- Controller Jessie Evelyn Elgar, Auxiliary Territorial Service.
- Brigadier William Robert Norris Hinde DSO, late Royal Armoured Corps.
- Colonel Hugh Valdemar Sigvaid Muller, Special List (ex-Indian Army).
- Colonel William Ernest Pearson, late Royal Regiment of Artillery.
- Brigadier John Gordon Bedford-Roberts, The Argyll and Sutherland Highlanders (Princess Louise's).
- Brigadier Charles Gordon Stewart AMIMechE, Royal Electrical and Mechanical Engineers.
- Chief Principal Matron Anne Thomson RRC, Queen Alexandra's Imperial Military Nursing Service.
- Brigadier John Evered Witt MC, late Royal Army Service Corps.
- Brigadier Edmond Wodehouse, The Royal Welch Fusiliers.
- Brigadier Julian Jefferson, late Foot Guards. Lately Commander, North Caribbean Area.

Royal Air Force

- Air Commodore Eric Alfred Lumley MC, MB, BCh, DPH.
- Acting Air Commodore Henry Sam Francis Temple Jerrard.
- Group Captain Victor Swanton Bowling.
- Group Captain Robert James Pilgrim Morris.
- Group Captain John Willie Rose DSM, (Retired).
- Group Captain Harold Marshall Stanley Wright.

===== Civil Division =====
- Charles Ambrose Adams FRIC, Assistant Secretary, Ministry of Food.
- James Richard Alderson OBE, Assistant Secretary, Ministry of Town and Country Planning.
- Herbert Wilfred Ayers, Assistant Secretary, Ministry of National Insurance.
- Alderman George William Porntt Beswick JP, lately chairman, Derbyshire War Agricultural Executive Committee.
- John Henry Biggart MD, DSc, Professor of Pathology and Dean of the Faculty of Medicine, Queen's University, Belfast.
- Frank Bower, Chairman of the Finance and Taxation Committee, Association of British Chambers of Commerce.
- Colonel Edward de Winton Herbert Bradley DSO, MC, DL, Secretary, Territorial and Auxiliary Forces Association of the County of Lancaster (West).
- Alderman George Henry Bray JP, lately chairman, Herefordshire War Agricultural Executive Committee.
- John Hugh Burrell, Assistant Secretary, Home Office.
- John Busse, Vice-chairman of the Central Price Regulation Committee.
- Lieutenant-Colonel Ralph William Butler, Divisional Road Engineer, Eastern Division, Ministry of Transport.
- Paul Strangman Cadbury. For services to the Ministry of Food.
- Ambrose Callighan OBE, General Secretary, National Union of Blastfurnacemen, Ore Miners, Coke Workers and Kindred Trades.
- Elizabeth Dorothea Bowen Cole Cameron, Novelist.
- George William Alfred Canter, Secretary, Post Office Employees' Approved Society.
- James Clement JP, Chief Area Distribution Officer, Milk Products Division, Scotland, Ministry of Food.
- Richard Ronald John Copeland JP, DL. For services to the Boy Scout Movement in Staffordshire.
- Herbert William Cremer MSc, FRIC, Consulting Engineer; President, Institute of Chemical Engineers.
- Herbert Joseph Crofts MIMinE, MICE, Production Director, West Midlands Division, National Coal Board.
- Howard Usher Cunningham MC, Director, J. and J. Cunningham Ltd., Edinburgh.
- Maud Edith Cunnington. For services to archaeology.
- Edward Southward Curphey MBE, MINA, deputy director of Dockyards, Admiralty.
- Major Archibald Douglas Currie MC, TD, Director, Currie and Company (Newcastle) Ltd.
- Stuart Davey MBE, Director of Contracts (Air), Ministry of Supply.
- The Reverend Gwilym Davies, President, Welsh National Council, United Nations Association.
- Graham Richards Dawbarn FRIBA, FRAeS, Partner, Norman and Dawbarn, Architects and Consulting Engineers.
- Ernest Sidney Owen Dunlop, Director of Army Contracts, War Office.
- Edgar Charles Ellen MC, lately Chairman of the London Discount Market Association.
- Major John Frederick Ferguson, Chief Constable, Kent Constabulary.
- Professor Alexander Findlay DSc, LLD, FRIC. For services to Chemistry.
- Charles Eric Longsdon Fletcher, Assistant Secretary, Board of Customs and Excise.
- Lieutenant-Colonel William French DSO, MC, Superintendent, Technological Department, City and Guilds of London Institute.
- Sydney Clayton Fryers, House Governor and Secretary, Leeds General Infirmary.
- George Prowse Gilchrist MBE, Controller of Supplies, Ministry of Works.
- Harry Samuel Gosney, Regional Controller, Midlands Region, Ministry of Labour and National Service.
- Alan Arnold Griffith DEng, FRS, Research Engineer, Rolls-Royce, Ltd.
- George Spencer Hallas OBE, MC, MICE, Director of Works, Air Ministry.
- Alderman George Frederick Hamer JP. For public services in Montgomeryshire.
- Edgar James Hare, lately Secretary to the Governors of Queen Anne's Bounty.
- Basil Lucas Quixano Henriques JP, lately Warden of the Bernhard Baron St George's Jewish Settlement, Stepney. Member, Council of the National Association of Boys' Clubs.
- William Frederick Higgins OBE, MSc, Superintendent, Physics Division, National Physical Laboratory.
- Christopher Hollyoak OBE, MIMechE, Chief Superintendent, Royal Ordnance Factories, Woolwich.
- Herbert John Humphrys DSO, OBE, MC, lately Divisional Inspector of Mines, Ministry of Fuel and Power.
- Percy Croom-Johnson MICE, Chief Engineer, London Transport Executive.
- Dorothy Mary Elliott Jones OBE, JP, chairman, National Institute of Houseworkers, Ltd.
- Jack Jones, author and playwright.
- William Richard Jones DSc, Professor Emeritus of the University of London and of the Imperial College of Science and Technology. For services to the Board of Trade.
- Cecil Kershaw MIMechE, Director, British Optical and Precision Engineers, Ltd. For services to the production of optical instruments.
- Alexander King DSc, Chief Scientific Liaison Officer, Office of the Lord President of the Council.
- Russell Latham MC, Deputy Timber Controller, Board of Trade.
- Isaac Lawton, Assistant Secretary, Ministry of Civil Aviation.
- William Charles Letts OBE, Accountant-General, Ministry of Pensions.
- Thomas George Lund, Secretary of the Law Society.
- Henry Alvin Mahony PhD, FDSRCS, lately Principal Dental Officer, Ministry of Health.
- John Mann JP, Convener, Lanarkshire County Council.
- Arthur Howard Mathias, chairman, Retail Distributive Trades Conference.
- Edward Rowland Alworth Merewether MD, BS, FRCP, Senior Medical Inspector of Factories, Ministry of Labour and National Service.
- Henry Allen Dugdale Neville FRIC, lately Professor of Agricultural Chemistry, University of Reading.
- Albert Gordon Newman, Assistant Solicitor, Office of HM Procurator General and Treasury Solicitor.
- Tom Seth Newman JP, Secretary, Hearts of Oak Benefit Society.
- George Frederick O'Dell MIEE, Director of Contracts, General Post Office.
- Malcolm Osborne RA, President, Royal Society of Painter-Etchers and Engravers.
- John Forrester-Paton JP, President, World Alliance of the Young Men's Christian Associations (YMCA). Chairman of the Scottish Council, 1932–47.
- William Henry Leonard Patterson, Assistant Secretary, Board of Trade.
- Margery Perham MA, Reader in Colonial Administration, University of Oxford.
- Henry Bettesworth Phillips, Managing Owner of the Carl Rosa Opera Company.
- Lieutenant-Colonel Jocelyn Arthur Adair Pickard DSO, MInstT, Director General, Royal Society for the Prevention of Accidents.
- Michael Herbert Pickles, Joint Deputy Wool Controller, Board of Trade.
- Wilfred Eric Rice OBE, JP, chairman, Walham Green Disablement Advisory Committee.
- James Ritchie DSc, Professor of Natural History, University of Edinburgh.
- Walter Stewart Roberts, lately Assistant Secretary, Foreign Office.
- John Knewstub Maurice Rothenstein PhD, Director and Keeper of the Tate Gallery.
- Herbert Babington Robin Rowell AFC, DL, Chairman of Directors, R. and W. Hawthorn, Leslie and Company, Ltd., Newcastle upon Tyne.
- Percy Alan Sanders OBE, AMIMechE, JP, DL, Vice-chairman, Incorporated Soldiers', Sailors' and Airmen's Help Society.
- Frank Ogilvie Stewart, Assistant Secretary, Scottish Home Department.
- Francis John Stratton, lately Controller of Leather and Footwear, Board of Trade.
- Ethel Strudwick OBE, MA, chairman, Headmistresses Employment Committee and lately High Mistress, St Paul's Girls' School.
- Harold Victor Taylor OBE, DSc, lately Senior Education and Advisory Officer, Ministry of Agriculture and Fisheries.
- Richard Courtney Smith Taylor OBE, Assistant Paymaster General.
- George Alfred Titman MVO, OBE, Secretary, Lord Chamberlain's Office.
- William Leonard Tregoning, Chief of Industry Division, Commerce and Industry Bipartite Control Group, Control Commission for Germany (British Element).
- John Ernest Alfred Underwood MB, BS, MRCS, LRCP, DPH, Principal Medical Officer, Ministry of Education.
- Samuel Philip Viant JP, MP, Member of Parliament for West Willesden, December 1923 - October 1931, and since 1935. For political and public services.
- Martin Yorke Watson, Principal Assistant Secretary, Ministry of Defence.
- Ernest Powell Weller. Bursar of Gonville and Cams College, Cambridge. For services to the Ministry of Agriculture and Fisheries.
- Arnold Sydney Whitehead, Accountant and Comptroller General, Board of Inland Revenue.
- Norman Wilkinson OBE, Marine painter.
- John Gideon Wilson, chairman and managing director, John and Edward Bumpus, Ltd.

Diplomatic Service and Overseas List

- William Ewart Davis, Labour Attaché at His Majesty's Embassy in Paris.
- Sydney Entwisle Kay MBE, His Majesty's Consul-General at Marseilles.
- William Halford Lawson BA, FCA, United Kingdom Deputy for the Austrian Treaty.
- Norman Nairn OBE, managing director of Nairn Transport, Beirut.
- Professor Walter Fitzwilliam Starkie LittD, British Council Representative in Spain.
- Wilfred Eade Agar, OBE, lately Professor of Zoology, Melbourne University, State of Victoria.
- The Honourable Thomas Henry Bath, lately Member of the Legislative Assembly, State of Western Australia. For services in connexion with work for primary producers.
- William Arthur Weir Clark, Chief Secretary of the Central African Council.
- Charles Samuel Curtis, MD, medical director and Superintendent of Newfoundland Medical Service.
- Charles Alfred Derham, MC, lately President of the Chamber of Manufacturers of the State of Victoria.
- Philip Gruchy, General Manager, Anglo-Newfoundland Development Co., Ltd.
- Percival Stephen Shadforth, lately Manager of the Commonwealth Bank in Hobart and Financial Adviser to the Government of Tasmania.
- Lieutenant-Colonel Harold Arthur Faulkner Wilkinson, MC, Private Secretary and ADC to Governors of the State of Victoria since 1906.
- James Robbie Farquharson, OBE, General Manager of the Tanganyika Railways.
- Bryan Edwin Frayling, OBE, ARSM, MInstMM, Colonial Mines Service, lately Chief Inspector of Mines, Nigeria.
- John Wilson Norris, Chief Inspecting Engineer, Crown Agents for the Colonies.
- The Right Reverend William Thomas Porter, DD, Roman Catholic Bishop of the Gold Coast.
- Arnold Morgan Punnett, OBE. For public services in St Vincent, Windward Islands.
- Paul Sammy. For public services in Singapore.
- Henry Bennett Shaw, Colonial Police Service, lately Assistant Inspector General of Police, Palestine.
- Frederick Becher Taylor, OBE, Chairman of the Aden Port Trust.

Honorary Commanders

- Dato Nik Ahmad Kamil Bin Haji Nik Mahmud, Mentri Besar, Kelantan, Federation of Malaya.
- Raja Abdul Rashid, Raja-di-Hilir, Perak, Federation of Malaya.

==== Officer of the Order of the British Empire (OBE) ====
===== Military Division =====
Royal Navy

- Instructor Lieutenant-Commander Frederick Ernest Berry.
- Temporary Commander Leslie Alan Brown, Royal Navy Volunteer Reserve.
- Temporary Commander Douglas Walter Child, Royal Navy Volunteer Reserve.
- Commander John Graham Forbes.
- Major Campbell Richard Hardy DSO, Royal Marines.
- Captain Edmund Howard Neville Harvey, Royal Navy (Retired).
- Mortimer Joseph Lawrence DSC, Chief Engineer Officer, Royal Fleet Auxiliary.
- Temporary Acting Commander Jack Lees, Royal Navy Volunteer Reserve.
- Engineer Commander Daniel Patrick O'Dwyer (Retired).
- The Reverend Owen Roebuck, Chaplain.
- Commander Alfred George Spears.

Army

- Lieutenant-Colonel Stanley Acheson MBE, Royal Army Service Corps.
- Lieutenant-Colonel John Gerald Wolfe-Barry, Royal Regiment of Artillery.
- Chief Commander Irene Jenny Josephine Bignold de Cologan, Auxiliary Territorial Service.
- Lieutenant-Colonel Derek Grant Birkett, Royal Regiment of Artillery.
- Lieutenant-Colonel and Staff Paymaster, 1st Class Cecil Charles Blackwell MBE, Royal Army Pay Corps.
- Lieutenant-Colonel Charles Neil Melsworth Blair, The Black Watch (Royal Highland Regiment).
- Lieutenant-Colonel John Waistell Bowey TD, Army Cadet Force.
- Lieutenant-Colonel William Dalison Keown-Boyd, The King's Royal Rifle Corps.
- Lieutenant-Colonel Henry James Sinclair Brooke, The Queen's Own Royal West Kent Regiment.
- Lieutenant-Colonel The Honourable Henry Charles Hovell-Thurlow-Cumming-Bruce DSO, The Seaforth Highlanders (Ross-shire Buffs, The Duke of Albany's).
- Lieutenant-Colonel Leslie George Hamlyn Bryant, The Worcestershire Regiment.
- Lieutenant-Colonel Charles Edward Bull MBE, DCM, Royal Army Medical Corps.
- Lieutenant-Colonel Edward Maitland-Makgill-Crichton MBE, The Queen's Own Cameron Highlanders.
- Lieutenant-Colonel Raynard William Dale, Army Cadet Force.
- Lieutenant-Colonel John Eathorne Foden, General List.
- Lieutenant-Colonel Rodney Charles Foster, The Sherwood Foresters (Nottinghamshire and Derbyshire Regiment).
- Lieutenant-Colonel John Herbert Gillington MBE, MC, BA, Corps of Royal Engineers.
- Lieutenant-Colonel Percy Hugh Gough, Royal Regiment of Artillery.
- Lieutenant-Colonel James Aylmer Hall, The King's Own Royal Regiment (Lancaster).
- Lieutenant-Colonel Charles William Peter Head, Royal Regiment of Artillery.
- Lieutenant-Colonel Charles William Howard, Royal Regiment of Artillery.
- Lieutenant-Colonel Reginald Charles Instrall BA, AMIEE, Royal Corps of Signals.
- Lieutenant-Colonel Douglas Forsyth Johnston TD, Royal Artillery, Territorial Army.
- Lieutenant-Colonel John William Lisle, Corps of Royal Engineers.
- Lieutenant-Colonel Kenneth Campbell-Meiklejohn, Special List (ex-Indian Army).
- Brigadier Thomas Lewin Thurgill Miller, Special List (ex-Indian Army).
- Lieutenant-Colonel Philip Stanley Mitcheson DSO, Special List (ex-Indian Army).
- Lieutenant-Colonel Charles Richard Warrens Norman, The Durham Light Infantry.
- Lieutenant-Colonel Donal Patrick O'Kelly, Coldstream Guards.
- Lieutenant-Colonel Sidney William Packwood, Special List (ex-Indian Army).
- Lieutenant-Colonel John Claude Rowlandson, Royal Regiment of Artillery.
- Lieutenant-Colonel Gerald Kennedy Nicholas Trevaskis, The Northern Rhodesia Regiment, General List, Infantry (African Colonial Forces Section).
- Lieutenant-Colonel Albert William Turner AMIMechE, Corps of Royal Engineers.
- Lieutenant-Colonel Michael John Woollcombe DSO, Royal Tank Regiment.
- Lieutenant-Colonel Andrew George Heveningham, Royal Army Veterinary Corps. Lately Senior Veterinary Officer, Trans-Jordan Frontier Force.
- Lieutenant-Colonel Harry Owen Hughes ED, Hong Kong Volunteer Defence Force.

Royal Air Force

- Acting Group Captain Henry Everard Crichton Boxer.
- Wing Commander Richard Cecil Ayling.
- Wing Commander Wilfred Bowes.
- Wing Commander Oliver Russell Donaldson DSO, DFC.
- Wing Commander Sidney Charles George.
- Wing Commander Morgan George McNama.
- Wing Commander William Bentley Murray DFC.
- Acting Wing Commander John Sinclair Frankland Hood, Royal Air Force Volunteer Reserve.
- Acting Wing Commander Alfred Barnes Nicholas.
- Acting Wing Commander Thomas Graham Robertson.
- Acting Wing Commander Aubrey Sidney-Wilmot.
- Squadron Leader George Walter Salt.

===== Civil Division =====
- Charles Abell, Manager, Transatlantic Service, British Overseas Airways Corporation.
- Douglas Hay Reavell Adamson, Senior Inspector of Taxes, Board of Inland Revenue.
- George Henry Allison FSI, Senior Quantity Surveyor, Ministry of Health.
- Elizabeth Andrews JP. For political and public services in Wales.
- Percy Vincent Arculus, Principal, Ministry of Education.
- John Speed Balderstone MBE, chief executive officer, Assistance Board.
- Elizabeth Emily Banister JP, Headmistress, Lambeth Road Secondary Modern Girls' School, Liverpool.
- George Ronald Barclay, chairman, Watford District Committee, Eastern Regional Board for Industry.
- Alan John Bayly, Finance Officer, Home Counties Region, General Post Office.
- Wilfred Blackwell Beard, General Secretary, United Patternmarkers' Association.
- Alderman Charles William Beardsley JP, chairman, West Riding of Yorkshire Rivers Board.
- John Bedford MBE, chairman, Plymouth Savings Committee.
- John Martin Binmore MINA, MIMarE, Principal Officer, West of Scotland District, Ministry of Transport.
- Leonard Forbes Boden, Principal, Ministry of Town and Country Planning.
- Alan Bond, Chief Constable, Rutland, and Commandant, Police Training College, Ryton.
- Winifred Bramhall MBE, Inspector of Welfare of the Blind, Ministry of Health.
- Walter Theodore Karl Braunholtz PhD, FRIC, Secretary, Institution of Gas Engineers.
- Winifred Elsie Brenchley DSc, Head of Botanical Department, Rothamsted Experimental Station.
- William Brown, chairman, Chesterfield Savings Committee.
- Alexander Robson Bruce, Trade Commissioner, Class 2, Ottawa.
- Captain Cecil Crossley Buckler MICE, lately Regional Director of Opencast Coal, Ministry of Fuel and Power.
- William Finlayson Burton, Principal, Scottish Education Department.
- Eric Ashton Carpenter JP, chairman, Manchester Business Training Committee.
- Grace Hardyman Caulfeild RRC, lately Honorary Secretary, Portsmouth Branch, Soldiers', Sailors' and Airmen's Families Association.
- Anne, Lady Dalrymple-Champneys. For charitable services.
- William Rodney Charlton, Superintending Inspector, HM Customs and Excise.
- James Denys Percival Chataway, Principal, Board of Trade.
- Stephen William Cheveley MSc. For services to Agriculture.
- Captain Alfred Thomas Church, Master, RMS Newfoundland, Johnston Warren Lines Ltd.
- Sydney Townsend Clark, Production and Supplies Officer, British Iron and Steel Federation.
- Benjamin Cohen, Administrative Officer, Cairo, Ministry of Transport.
- George Edward Condllffe MIEE, Director, Electric and Musical Industries Research Laboratories, Ltd., Hayes, Middlesex.
- George Cowe, chairman, Schools Advisory Committee of the Scottish Savings Committee.
- George Noel Cox, Principal Officer, Ministry of Finance, Northern Ireland.
- William Cox, Director of Publications, HM Stationery Office.
- George Craig, Deputy Regional Controller, East and West Ridings Region, Ministry of Labour and National Service.
- Douglas Cranston, Chief Regional Officer, Midland Region, Central Office of Information.
- Ivor Gustavus Cummings, Administrative Officer, Colonial Office.
- Edith Dare, Matron, Queen Charlotte's Maternity Hospital, London.
- Alderman Lewis Davies JP. For public services in Staffordshire.
- Walter Percy Day, Head of Special Effects Department, London Film Studios, Shepperton.
- John Charles Dean MInstT, General Manager, West Yorkshire Road Car Company Ltd.
- Robert James Dippy AMIEE, Senior Principal Scientific Officer, Ministry of Supply.
- George Leonard Alfred Downing MICE, AMIMechE, Borough Engineer and Surveyor, Hackney Metropolitan Borough Council.
- Douglas Ross Edge, lately Wagon Repair Adviser to the Ministry of Transport.
- Averill Doris Eills MBE, JP, Honorary Secretary, City of Liverpool Branch of the Incorporated Soldiers', Sailors' and Airmen's Help Society.
- Eric William Eldridge, Trust Officer, Public Trustee Office.
- Hadrian Cyril Alick Elithorn, Secretary, Insurance Unemployment Board.
- Alderman George Edward Elmer JP, General Secretary, National Builders Labourers and Constructional Workers Society.
- Gordon Rattray Fenton MICE, MIStructE. For services as Chief Engineer, Docks and Inland Waterways Executive (Aire and Calder Navigation).
- Horace Francis Fitch, deputy director of Navy Contracts, Admiralty.
- James Fraser, Conservator of Forests, Inverness, Forestry Commission.
- George Anthony Gardner MIStructE, Chief Structural Engineer, Ministry of Works.
- William Garrett, President, Belfast Battalion of the Boys' Brigade.
- Ella Hudson Gasking, chairman and Joint Managing Director, Batchelor's Peas Ltd.
- George Gibbard JP, Chairman of the Livestock Committee, National Farmers' Union.
- John William Gofton, HM Inspector, Ministry of Education.
- Vernon Goodhand, Deputy Chairman, Royal Air Forces Association.
- James Porter Graham, President, Federation of Building Trade Employees of Northern Ireland, Ltd.
- Bernard Charles Gray MBE, Clerk of Accounts, Vote Office, Supreme Court of Judicature.
- Arthur Benjamin Griffiths FSAA, City Treasurer, Sheffield.
- Charles Henry Griffiths FRAeS, assistant director, Engine Research and Development, Ministry of Supply.
- David Howell Griffiths JP, Member, Wales Area and National Executive Councils of the British Legion.
- William Edward Bertram Griffiths, deputy director of Navigation, Ministry of Civil Aviation.
- George Nelson Haden MIMechE, chairman and managing director, G. N. Haden & Sons Ltd., Heating and Electrical Engineering Contractors.
- Eudora Haigh, Member, British Red Cross Society. For Services to members of the Forces in East Lancashire.
- Clifford Alfred Harrison FCA, chairman, Keighley Industrial Savings Sub-Committee.
- Frank Eric Harrison MC, Honorary Organiser of the Special Savings Campaigns in Blackpool.
- Cyril Herbert Hart MBE, assistant director of Navy Accounts, Admiralty.
- David McCowan Hill, Secretary, Scottish National Building Trades Federation.
- Henry Hill MIEE, lately Staff Controller, North Eastern Region, General Post Office.
- Amos Brook Hirst, Chairman of the Football Association.
- William Hogg, First Class Valuer, Board of Inland Revenue.
- Harold Charles Holbrook. For services as Head of Branch, Registry of Friendly Societies.
- Job Holland. For services to the Refractories Industries (Silicosis) Scheme.
- John Holmes, Chief Milk Production Advisory Officer, Ministry of Agriculture and Fisheries.
- Lieutenant-Colonel Frederick Robert Hornby, Employed in a Department of the Foreign Office.
- Fred Hughes MBE, lately Benefit Fund Secretary, Clerical and Administrative Workers Union.
- Alderman Edward Lawrence Hunt JP, chairman, Ipswich Committee, Air Training Corps.
- Frederic Bickerton Hunt, Senior Deputy Director of Victualling, Admiralty.
- Walter Raymond Iley, Director, Social Administration Division, Allied Commission for Austria (British Element).
- Nathan Isaacs, Director, Derby and Company Ltd.
- Councillor Douglas John James MBE. For services to National Savings in Tottenham.
- Reginald Frederick Jenkins, Principal, Air Ministry.
- Wilfrid Alexander Johnson ACA, Deputy Chief Accountant, Ministry of Agriculture and Fisheries.
- Cyril Frederick Johnston, Director, Gillett and Johnston, Ltd., Bell-founders, Croydon.
- John Dudley Johnston, Curator and Honorary Secretary, Royal Photographic Society of Great Britain.
- Alexander James Kellar, Civil Assistant, War Office.
- Herbert John Kelly, Northern Region Representative, British Council.
- Hugh Graham Larmor, Director, Brookfield Spinning Company Ltd., Belfast.
- Edwin Phrlip Le Masurier MBE, Lieutenant Bailiff of Jersey.
- Horace Tyrrell Lewis, Honorary Treasurer and Honorary Solicitor, National Association for the Employment of Regular Sailors, Soldiers and Airmen.
- Sidney Walter Douglas Lockwood, Works Manager, Armstrong-Whitworth Aircraft Ltd.
- Captain John MacGillivray, Farmer. For services to the breeding of Beef Shorthorn cattle.
- George Stewart Mackay, Regional Petroleum Officer, Edinburgh, Ministry of Fuel and Power.
- Neil Clark McPherson, Divisional Road Haulage Officer, Northern Area, Ministry of Transport.
- James Aratoon Malcolm, Honorary Treasurer of the United Services Corps and the Victory (Ex-Services) Association.
- Otto Blashford Meadmore, Director and Trustee of the Independent Order of Odd-Fellows (Manchester Unity) Friendly Society.
- Horace William Minshull MBE, chief executive officer, Foreign Office.
- George Edward Mitchell, Vice-chairman and Secretary of the China Association.
- James Alexander Mitchell, lately Divisional Officer, National Fire Service, Northern Ireland.
- Thomas George Mitchell. For services to the Londonderry City Savings Committee.
- William Mitchell MIMechE, Chief Marine Engineer, Vickers-Armstrongs, Ltd., Barrow-in-Furness.
- Arthur Ernest Monks JP, Labour Liaison Officer, Ministry of Agriculture and Fisheries.
- William Lionel Moore JP, Deputy Chairman, Worcestershire Agricultural Executive Committee.
- Commander Percy Arthur Morgan, Royal Naval Reserve (retired), Dockmaster, Railway Executive, Southern Region, Southampton.
- Sydney Hubert Morgan MC, MICE, lately Borough Surveyor of Rochdale.
- Stanley John Muddiman, deputy director of Audit, Exchequer and Audit Department.
- Charles Henry Newble, Director, Ministry of Pensions.
- James Newman JP, Member, Woolwich Metropolitan Borough Council.
- John Charles Orr, Divisional Food Officer, Northern Ireland Division, Ministry of Food.
- Thomas Humphrey Paget, Medal designer and modeller.
- Ralph Palmer, Head Postmaster, Newcastle upon Tyne.
- Nigel Owen Parry MA, JP, Principal, Alnwick Emergency Teachers Training College, Northumberland.
- James Patton MBE, MINA, Director and General Manager, Smith's Dock Company Ltd., South Bank, Middlesbrough.
- Herbert John Paul MICE, Chief Engineer, Yorkshire Ouse Catchment Board.
- Herbert Augustine Pendergast, deputy director of General Stores, Ministry of Supply.
- Hastings Ackroyd Perkin, Senior Partner, Rutherford Osborne and Perkm Ltd.
- Oscar John Phillips FIA, Assistant Comptroller, National Debt Office.
- Lieutenant-Colonel Horace Frederick Piper, Commander, Regierungsbezirk, Luneburg, Control Commission for Germany (British Element).
- Frederick James Burns Reid, Adviser to the Ministry of Food on Milk Distribution in Scotland.
- James Jackson Robertson MA, BD, Rector of Aberdeen Grammar School.
- William Robert Robins JP, Member, Swindon Borough Council.
- Bernard Harry Rockman JP, DL, chairman, King's Cross Local Employment Committee.
- George Joseph Rons, Chief Clerk, Prison Commission.
- Douglas George Ross, Chief Constable, Sutherland.
- James Ross, Fire Force Commander, North Eastern Area-of Scotland.
- Edward Roughley MBE, Chief Stores Officer, Home Office.
- Thomas Edmondston Saxby FRFPS, LRCP. & SE, JP, Medical Practitioner, Unst, Shetland.
- Harold Shand MBE, lately Director, G. A. Harvey and Company Ltd., Greenwich.
- Thomas Appleby Shearer, Principal, War Office.
- Alderman John Shee JP. For public services in Bradford.
- Joseph Shuttleworth, Principal Officer, Ministry of Health and Local Government, Northern Ireland.
- John William Simpson, lately Secretary, Incorporated Municipal Electrical Association.
- William Roger Sinclair, Finance Director, Milk Division, Ministry of Food.
- Alfred Sixsmith, Assistant Regional Controller, Ministry of National Insurance.
- Charles Davidson Smith JP, lately Secretary, Wigtownshire Agricultural Executive Committee.
- John Smith JP, Alderman, Crewe Town Council.
- Joseph Arthur Speed, Honorary Secretary, National Association of Insurance Committees.
- Mary Cecilia Wakefield, Lady Starmer, President, Durham County, National Association of Girls' Clubs and Mixed Clubs. For public services in County Durham.
- James Torrance Steele, Deputy Chief Inspector (Livestock), Department of Agriculture for Scotland.
- Captain Harold James Knox Stewart, Master, SS Turkistan, Strick Line (1923) Ltd.
- Osmond Guy Stewart MBE, chief executive officer, Ministry of National Insurance.
- Alfred Edward Stillwell, Chief Industrial Relations Officer, Ministry of Labour and National Service.
- Samuel Thomas Cryer Stillwell, Senior Principal Scientific Officer, Forest Products Research Laboratory, Department of Scientific and Industrial Research.
- Stanley James Bruce Morrison-Story FIAA, Technical Adviser, South-West Region, War Damage Commission and Central Land Board.
- John Whitley Suddards, chairman and managing director, J. Cawthra and Company Ltd., Bradford.
- Nathan Sutton MBE, FAI, Chief Compensation Surveyor, Ministry of Works.
- Frederick George Tayloe FIA, Secretary and Treasurer, Prudential Approved Societies.
- Bernard Thistlethwaite FCA, Director, Division of Monetary Accounting, European Regional Office, United Nations Relief and Rehabilitation Administration.
- Freda Thompson, Joint Regional Administrator, Women's Voluntary Services, Midland Region.
- Hugh Trotter CIE, Comptroller of the Nuffield Centre in London for HM Forces.
- Walter Tye FRAeS, Chief Technical Officer, Air Registration Board.
- Lewis Oswald Varrall MM, Assistant Accountant General, Ministry of Labour and National Service.
- Alderman William Hubert Vaughan, Deputy Chairman, Glamorgan Agricultural Executive Committee.
- Frederick William Verry, assistant director of Accounts, Air Ministry.
- Rosa Ward JP, chairman,Guide International Service (G.I.S)
- Walter Ward JP. For public services in the West Riding of Yorkshire.
- William John Francis Wellard MIEE, AMIMechE, Superintending Mechanical and Electrical Engineer (Grade II), Air Ministry.
- Gilbert Duncan West DSc, Associate Professor of Physics, Military College of Science.
- George Ronald White, Deputy Controller, Leather Control, Board of Trade.
- Major William White DSO, MC, JP, Headmaster, Coleraine Academical Institution, Co. Londonderry.
- Jane Honora Wicksteed, Member, Council of the Chartered Society of Physiotherapy.
- Hilda Freeman Williams MBE, Regional Administrator, Women's Voluntary Services, North Eastern Region.
- Leslie Gordon Wilson, Industrial Member, East and West Ridings Regional Board for Industry.
- Harry Woodhead, chairman, Local Appeal Board, Bradford.
- Ambrose William Wray, Principal, Ministry of Civil Aviation.
- Norah Wright, District Administrator, Women's Voluntary Services, Angus, Fife and Kinross.
- Lieutenant-Colonel Thomas Young WS, Local Army Welfare Officer, Scottish Command.

Diplomatic Service and Overseas List

- Herbert Addison, British subject resident in Egypt.
- Major Frederick John James Day, attached to a Department of the Foreign Office.
- Henry Hiddlestone Green, Assistant Fields Manager, Iraq Petroleum Company, Kirkuk.
- Kit Kenney, First Secretary (Information) at His Majesty's Embassy in Oslo.
- Robert Kirk MD, BSc, Bacteriologist, Sudan Medical Service.
- Frederick Robert Limpenny, British subject resident in the Argentine Republic.
- James McDonald, His Majesty's Consul at Portland, Oregon.
- Samuel Kissick Millar, until recently Principal, British Middle East Office, Cairo (now Principal, Foreign Office).
- John Charles Francis Miller, British subject resident in Venezuela.
- John Munro, Manager in Brazil of the Western Telegraph Company, Ltd.
- Thomas Godric Aylett Muntz, until recently First Secretary (Commercial) at His Majesty's Embassy at Lisbon (now Acting Counsellor (Commercial) at His Majesty's Embassy in Ankara).
- Alison Anne Norie, Director of Civilian Relief, British Red Cross Society, Pans.
- John Charles Dameron Scarlett, Financial Adviser to His Majesty's Embassy in Paris.
- Douglas George Whittall, British subject resident in Turkey.
- Arthur Geoffrey Trevor-Wilson MBE, British Consul at Hanoi.
- Edward Cunnington Allen, Financial Secretary, Basutoland.
- Emory Delmont Alvord, MSc, Director of Native Agriculture, Southern Rhodesia.
- Captain William Frederick Baddams, Officer of the Harbour Board of the State of South Australia.
- John Vernon Bartlett. For services in connexion with the provision of homes in the State of South Australia for blind ex-servicemen of the two wars.
- John Harold Burridge, Director of Crown Lands and Surveys, Newfoundland.
- William Richards Dawe. For services as President of Great War Veterans Association of Newfoundland.
- Albert Maynard Dawkins, Prominent Agriculturalist and Member of the advisory board of Agriculture in the State of South Australia.
- Benjamin Walter Durham, MIMM, JP, formerly President of Chamber of Mines and vice-president of Rhodesian Mining Federation.
- Alfred Ernest Floyd, Mus. Doc., formerly Organist and Conductor of St. Paul's Cathedral Choir, Melbourne, State of Victoria.
- Helene Dorothy Grey, Matron of Royal Melbourne Hospital, State of Victoria.
- John Leswere Gullage. For service in Government of Newfoundland steamers.
- Matthew Edgar Hawco, District Magistrate, formerly Minister of Posts and Telegraphs, Newfoundland.
- Ernest Glanville Hicks, Secretary and Chief Organiser, Lord Mayor's Fund for Metropolitan Hospitals and Charities, Melbourne, State of Victoria.
- Francis Eric Hitchins, Member of the Australian Wool Board and President of the Australian Wool and Meat Producers Association.
- Neville Jones, FRAI, formerly Keeper of Department of Prehistory, Ethnography and National History, National Museum, Southern Rhodesia.
- Frances Gertrude Kumm, President, National Council of Women, State of Victoria.
- John Claude Martin, LLB, Assistant Crown Solicitor, State of South Australia.
- Douglas Sinclair Miller, Director of Education, Basutoland.
- Merlyn Myer, Member of the National Council, Australian Red Cross Society in the State of Victoria.
- Damaris Margaret McKendrick, Matron, Psychopathic Home, Millbrook Rise, State of Tasmania.
- Eustace Meredith Rice, Chief Engineer, Rhodesian Railways Limited.
- John Frederick Ward, MA, Head Master, Prince Albert College, State of South Australia.
- Arthur Alan Wilson, formerly Member of Legislative Assembly, Western Australia. For services in improving industrial conditions.
- William David Bathgate, MC, LRCP, LRCS (Ed.), LRFPS, Medical Superintendent, Hospital of the Edinburgh Medical Missionary Society, Nazareth, Palestine.
- Howard Read Binns, MRCVS, Colonial Veterinary Service, lately Senior Veterinary Research Officer, Palestine.
- Lieutenant-Colonel Theodore Louis Bowring, AMICE, Director of Public Works, British Honduras.
- James John Joseph Giraldi, MD, MRCS, LRCP, Physician, King George V Hospital, Gibraltar.
- Charles Norman Griffin, MBE, MD, CM, Colonial Medical Service, Federal Senior Medical Officer, Leeward Islands.
- The Very Reverend Father Edwin Philip Harcourt, Vicar General, Windward Islands.
- Herbert Leslie Harris, JP, Town Clerk, Kingston & St. Andrew Corporation, Jamaica.
- Harold Noad Haskell, Headmaster, Harrison College, Barbados.
- Frank Claude Haslam, FRIBA, assistant director (Architectural), Public Works Department, Nigeria.
- John Henry Iliffe, lately Keeper, Palestine Archaeological Museum.
- Francis Derek Jakeway, Colonial Administrative Service, Secretary to the Government, Seychelles.
- Shankar Dhondo Karve, MB, BS. For public services in Kenya.
- Henry Kendall, lately Government Town Planner, Palestine.
- Margaret Laing, MBE, Superintendent of the Teso Leper Mission, Kumi, Eastern Province, Uganda.
- Melville Eric Leslie, Colonial Administrative Service, lately Labour Commissioner, Nyasaland.
- Elizabeth Josephine Le Sueur, MB, BCh, Lady Medical Officer, Sarawak.
- Carmel Micallef, Director of Public Works, Malta.
- Arthur James Mitchell, deputy director of Public Works, Tanganyika.
- Abdool Latiff Mahomed Osman. For public services in Mauritius.
- John Parnall, Commissioner of Debts, Zanzibar.
- Reginald Harry Payne, Government Printer, Northern Rhodesia.
- Grant Ellcock Pilgrim, lately Master, Queen's Royal College, Trinidad.
- Gladys Plummer, MBE, Colonial Education Service, deputy director of Education (Women), Nigeria.
- Edowo Awunor Renner, MB, ChB, Senior Medical Officer, Sierra Leone.
- Harold Giles Richards, Colonial Administrative Service, Chief Assistant Secretary, Colonial Secretary's Office, Cyprus.
- Walter William Ridout, Town Clerk, Nairobi, Kenya.
- Hubert Tom Ross, Government Printer, Federation of Malaya.
- Frank Cooper Sands, MBE. For public services as Scout Commissioner for Malaya.
- George Francis Thomas Saunders, MD, BCh, BAO, Colonial Medical Service, Senior Medical Officer, Gold Coast.
- Kunwar Bachint Singh. For public services in Fiji.
- Eric Montague Tibbitt, Colonial Audit Service, assistant director, Colonial Audit Department.

Honorary Officers

- Isaac Babalola Akinyele, Ashipa Balogun of Ibadan, Nigeria.
- Haji Mohamed Eusoff Bin Yusof, Assistant Registrar of Co-operative Societies, Federation of Malaya.
- Lawrence Ekeng Richard Henshaw, MB, ChB, DTM, LM, Medical Officer, Nigeria.
- Raja Haji Kamaralzaman Bin Raja Mansur, lately Malayan Civil Service.
- Vadake Menokil Narayana Menon. For public services in the Federation of Malaya.
- Akinpelu Obisesan. For public services in Nigeria.

==== Member of the Order of the British Empire (MBE) ====
===== Military Division =====
Royal Navy

- William Gerald Blight, Acting Commissioned Wardmaster.
- William George Bruty, Commissioned Engineer.
- Telegraphist Lieutenant Henry Victor Drury.
- George James Dyer, Warrant Recruiter, Royal Marines.
- Temporary Acting Lieutenant-Commander Thomas Ralston Lamont, Royal Navy Volunteer Reserve.
- Acting Lieutenant-Commander George Walter Morgan.
- Lieutenant John O'Sullivan (Retired).
- Acting Lieutenant-Commander Edward John Sawdy.
- Lieutenant-Commander Jeremiah Thomas Sheehan (Retired).
- Augustus Christmas George Sweet, Acting Commissioned Cookery Officer.
- Henry Francis Tomblin, Senior Chief Officer, Royal Naval Shore Wireless Service.

In recognition of bomb disposal service since the end of the war.

- Thomas Harold Walton, Temporary Acting Commissioned Gunner (T).

Army

- Major Denis Barber Ainley, Royal Regiment of Artillery.
- Warrant Officer Class I George Ashdown, Royal Regiment of Artillery.
- Major Wallace Henry Ayres, Royal Corps of Signals.
- Lieutenant-Colonel Sidney Ellis Baker TD, The Duke of Wellington's Regiment (West Riding), Territorial Army.
- Major Claud Glen Kelway-Bamber, The Argyll and Sutherland Highlanders (Princess Louise's).
- Junior Commander Margaret Wright Bishop, Auxiliary Territorial Service.
- Warrant Officer Class II Robert Arthur Bishop, Corps of Royal Engineers.
- Major William Henry Blake, The Rifle Brigade (Prince Consort's Own).
- Major William Alexander Brown Special List (ex-Indian Army).
- Major Alexander Gauld Cochrane, The Queen's Own Cameron Highlanders.
- Captain Edward John Cole, Royal Armoured Corps.
- Major Thomas Creech, Corps of Royal Engineers.
- Matron Elsie Muriel Ethelinda Dawe RRC, Queen Alexandra's Imperial Military Nursing Service.
- Lieutenant-Colonel George Donald de la Rue Browne, Special List (ex-Indian Army).
- Captain Peter Dootson, Royal Regiment of Artillery.
- Captain Charles Robert Durnford, Royal Army Medical Corps.
- Warrant Officer Class I Douglas Elliott, Royal Army Service Corps.
- Major Thomas Evans MC, The Royal Scots (The Royal Regiment).
- Major Charles Brian Penrose-Fitzgerald, General List (African Colonial Forces Section).
- Warrant Officer Class II Charles Fitzpatrick, Royal Regiment of Artillery.
- Major Patrick Elphinstone Fleming, Royal Electrical and Mechanical Engineers.
- Major and Staff Paymaster, 2nd Class Ronald Edwin Flitton, Royal Army Pay Corps.
- Lieutenant-Colonel Bernard Herbert Franklin, Special List (ex-Indian Army).
- Captain Harvey Cyril Freeman, Royal Electrical and Mechanical Engineers.
- Major Jack Montagu Freeman, Royal Army Service Corps.
- Captain Walter Augustus Smedley Gates, Royal Electrical and Mechanical Engineers.
- Major Kenneth Richards Gillmore, ex-Burma Army Service Corps, attached Royal Indian Army Service Corps (now released).
- Major Edward Purdy Gleadow, Royal Armoured Corps.
- Major John Richard Goodger, Corps of Royal Engineers.
- Major Arthur Aubrey Geaham, The Worcestershire Regiment, Territorial Army.
- Lieutenant-Colonel Victor Anderson Haddick, Special List (now General List, Infantry).
- Major Harold Hardy, Royal Electrical and Mechanical Engineers.
- Major Frances Healy, Royal Regiment of Artillery (now Extra Regimentally Employed List).
- Warrant Officer Class I Lawrence Rothwell Keys, Intelligence Corps.
- Major Hugh Holmes, The Royal Northumberland Fusiliers.
- Major William John Holohan, The Loyal Regiment (North Lancashire).
- Major William Edmund Ives MM, The Devonshire Regiment.
- Warrant Officer Class I Robert John Jones, Royal Army Service Corps.
- Major George Matthew Kirk, Royal Army Ordnance Corps.
- Warrant Officer Class I Frederick Latham, The Manchester Regiment.
- Major Donald Magee, Royal Army Educational Corps.
- Lieutenant Bernard Marney, The King's Own Yorkshire Light Infantry.
- Warrant Officer Class I Samuel John McHaffey, The Royal Inniskilling Fusiliers.
- Major Thomas McMullan, Army Cadet Force.
- Major Alastair Cheape Miller TD, The King's Own Yorkshire Light Infantry, Territorial Army.
- Major Raymond Ernest Miller, The Worcestershire Regiment (now Royal Army Service Corps).
- Cadet Major Arthur Pritchard MC, Array Cadet Force.
- Captain Meredith Roberts LRAM, ARCM, Extra Regimentally Employed List, Director of Music.
- Junior Commander Sybil Rothwell, Auxiliary Territorial Service.
- Major Peter Gordon Routley, Special List (ex-Indian Army).
- Major James Wesley Shaw, Royal Electrical and Mechanical Engineers.
- Warrant Officer Class I Robert Warwick Smalley, Royal Army Service Corps.
- Warrant Officer Class I Edwin John Thomas Smyth, Royal Army Service Corps.
- Warrant Officer Class I Bernard William Snook, Royal Army Educational Corps.
- Captain Thomas Edward Solman, Royal Army Service Corps.
- Warrant Officer Class II William Annand Thomson, The Gordon Highlanders, attached Army Cadet Force.
- Major Harry Leonard Frank Ward, 9th Hussars (Prince Albert's Own), Royal Armoured Corps.
- Major Neale Francis Gordon-Wilson, The Buffs (Royal East Kent Regiment).
- Major Thomas Foley Churchill Winnington, Grenadier Guards.
- Major Richard John Curnick, The Life Guards. Lately Second in Command, Cavalry Regiment, Trans-Jordan Frontier Force.
- Major Percival George Deere, Royal Army Service Corps, Lately Squadron Commander, Mechanised Regiment, Trans-Jordan Frontier Force.
- Captain Alberto Maria Rodrigues, Hong Kong Volunteer Defence Force.

In recognition of bomb disposal service since the end of the war.

- Major Richard Alfred Shorter, Corps of Royal Engineers.

Royal Air Force

- Acting Wing Commander Leslie Ernest Arnold Wright, Royal Air Force Volunteer Reserve.
- Squadron Leader George Charles Rowland Ackrill.
- Acting Squadron Leader Maurice Gilbert Down, Royal Air Force Volunteer Reserve.
- Acting Squadron Leader Arthur Hibbins MM.
- Flight Lieutenant Dennis William Ansell.
- Flight Lieutenant Robert John Frank Day.
- Flight Lieutenant William George Hales.
- Flight Lieutenant Philip Michael Sweatman Hedgeland.
- Flight Lieutenant Laurence Cecil Norris.
- Acting Flight Lieutenant Ifor John Davies.
- Flying Officer John Mackenzie.
- Warrant Officer Arthur Conrad Cook.
- Warrant Officer Arthur Fieldhouse.
- Warrant Officer Harry Frederick Friend.
- Warrant Officer William Edward Kingdom.
- Warrant Officer Leonard George Macey.
- Warrant Officer Leslie Harold Leekblade Tobin.
- Acting Warrant Officer Francis Finbarr Harvey.
- Flight Officer Joan Melles Carlin, Women's Auxiliary Air Force.

===== Civil Division =====
- Sydney Herbert Acres, Principal Staff Officer, Board of Customs and Excise.
- Margaret Ainslie, Higher Clerical Officer, Admiralty.
- James Henry Aitken, Chief Cartographer, Admiralty.
- Randall Frederick Alderton, Manager, Government Sales Division, Kodak Ltd., Middlesex.
- Kyle McClean Alexander JP, lately General Secretary, Presbyterian Health Insurance Society, Belfast.
- Ernest Appleby MM, lately Employer Member of the Reading District Committee, Southern Regional Board for Industry.
- Margaret Ellen Balding, lately Third Class Officer, Ministry of Labour and National Service.
- Margaret Fotherley Barrett, Deputy Chairman, Street Groups Committee, Birmingham Savings Committee.
- Evelyn Marie Bastin, Women's Land Army County Secretary for Devon.
- Frederick Charles Beale, lately Colliery Manager, Treherbert Colliery, National Coal Board, South-Western Division.
- George Leslie Bell, First Class Officer, Ministry of Labour and National Service.
- Captain Edward Arthur Bennett, Master, SS Elidir, Coppack Brothers and Company.
- Herbert James Bindon, Senior Executive Officer, Ministry of Civil Aviation.
- Harry Walter Allison Bleach, Clerk to the Licensing Authorities for Goods Vehicles and Public Service Vehicles, Ministry of Transport, Northern Traffic Area.
- Victor William Bone MIMechE, JP, Member of Lincoln Local Committee, Air Training Corps.
- Ethel Rose Booth, Ward Sister, Wellhouse Hospital, Barnet.
- Emily Olive Botham, Field Superintendent, Mission to Mediterranean Garrisons in Egypt.
- Ernest Bower, Honorary Secretary, Lincoln Division, Soldiers', Sailors' and Airmen's Families' Association.
- Thirza Eleanor Bowes, Collector of Taxes, Board of Inland Revenue.
- Frank Frederick Henry Boxall, Senior Executive Officer, Ministry of Civil Aviation.
- Flora Boyd, An Assistant Matron, Stobhill Hospital, Glasgow.
- Katharine Falconer Boyd, Superintendent Craibstone School of Rural Domestic Economy, Bucksburn, Aberdeenshire.
- Henry Gustave Brandt, Honorary Secretary, Stockport Savings Committee.
- John Brebner FRIC. For services as General Works Manager, Scottish Agricultural Industries, Aberdeen.
- Alfred Harvey Brown JP, Farmer, Hayling Island, Hampshire.
- Williamina Munro Brown, Higher Executive Officer, Ministry of Supply.
- Marguerite Olive Bryant, Secretary, Welsh Board for Industry.
- Iris Laura Bull, Organiser, Newburgh House Canteen, Winchester.
- Herbert Walter Burgess, Senior Executive Officer, Ministry of National Insurance, Cardiff.
- William Benjamin Camfield, Valuation Clerk, Higher Grade, Board of Inland Revenue.
- Frank Wallace Campion, Higher Executive Officer, Public Trustee Office.
- Frederic Thomas Campion, Higher Executive Officer, Foreign Office.
- Arthur Gerald Casey BEM, Evangelist and Secretary, Forces Welfare Branch, Church Army.
- Herbert Maurice Cashmore, Emeritus Librarian of the City of Birmingham and Past President of the Library Association.
- Edmondo Italo Patrizio Ceci, Staff Officer, Science Museum.
- Alfred John Charge, Keeper of Photographs, Imperial War Museum.
- William Clarence Charlton, Senior Executive Officer, Savings Bank Division, General Post Office.
- Joan Chignell, Executive Officer, Board of Trade.
- Alderman Alfred Frederick Joseph Chorley JP. For public services in Essex.
- Robert Clarke, Secretary, Linen Workers Approved Society.
- Arthur Grant Clarkson, Superintendent of the Land Charges and Agricultural Credits Departments, Land Registry.
- Lieutenant-Colonel Wilfred Edward Shewell-Cooper, Horticultural Officer, Eastern Command.
- Alice Mary Cowan, Founder and Leader of the Northwood Boys' Club, Middlesex.
- Alfred Cox, Works Manager, Wiggins Teape and Company (1919) Ltd., High, Wycombe.
- Alfred Edward Cox, Local Secretary, Southampton, Ancient Order of Foresters Friendly Society.
- Arthur Cox, Senior Executive Officer, Ministry of National Insurance.
- Frederick Alexis William Craddock, Senior Nurse Tutor, St. Bernard's Hospital, Southall.
- William Crawford, Chief Trains Clerk, Railway Executive, Southern Region.
- Henry Arthur Crawley, Senior Accounts Officer, Admiralty.
- Percival James Crisp, Senior Executive Officer, Air Ministry.
- Joseph Padgett Crook JP, District Secretary, Leeds, Independent Order of Rechabites.
- The Reverend Denis Daly, Superintendent of Missions to Seamen, Scotland.
- Basil Danells MC, Senior Chief Technical Officer, Ministry of Works.
- William Henry Damn AMIMechE, AIMarE, Chief Designer, Saunders Engineering and Shipyard Ltd., Beaumaris, Isle of Anglesey.
- William Henry Darlington MSc, AMIMechE, ASRAeS, Engineer, Metropolitan-Vickers Electrical Company, Ltd.
- Thomas George Davies AMInstT. For services as Traffic Manager, Western Welsh Omnibus Company, Ltd.
- William Rawson Davies, Higher Clerical Officer, Ministry of Supply.
- Albert William Dawe, District Officer, Penzance, HM Coastguard.
- James Edward Dean, Disablement Resettlement Officer, Midlands Region, Ministry of Labour and National Service.
- David Benjamin Dellar, Superintendent, Metropolitan Police Force.
- Norman Hungate Dennis, General Manager, Hull, British Industrial Solvents, Ltd.
- Robert Dickinson. For services to the Boy Scout Movement in Houghton-le-Spring and Sunderland.
- Phyllis Maria Knatchbull Dillistone, Housekeeping Sister, Papworth Village Settlement Sanatorium.
- Reginald Arthur Dods, Senior Staff Officer, Air Ministry.
- Ernest Alexander Thomas Edwards, lately Trade Union Member of the Eastern Regional Board for Industry.
- William Edwards, Member, Committee of Management of the National Amalgamated Approved Society.
- William Henry Edwards JP, chairman, Grays (Essex) Local Employment Committee.
- Stanley Emm, Staff Officer, Ministry of Transport.
- Alan Evans, Detective Superintendent, Derbyshire Constabulary.
- Helen Bridget Orr Ewing, County Organiser, Women's Voluntary Services, Somerset.
- Frederick Felgate, Higher Executive Officer, Board of Trade.
- James Ferguson, Superintendent, Belfast Head Post Office.
- Mabel Fidler, Headmistress, Princess Mary Village Homes (Approved School), Addlestone, Surrey.
- Leonard Henri Harcourt Finlay DSM, "S" Class Clerk, Admiralty.
- Elizabeth O'Kelly Finn, Head of Branch, Ministry of Food.
- Lucy Gladys Fitzpatrick. For services to children in Birkenhead.
- Stephen Fletcher FCA, County Accountant, Wiltshire and Somerset, Meat and Livestock Division, Ministry of Food.
- Richard Walker Francis JP, Alderman, Bishop's Castle (Shropshire) Town Council.
- William Freeman, lately London District Secretary of the Amalgamated Society of Woodworkers.
- Wilmet Hastings Frew, lately Higher Executive Officer, Scottish Education Department.
- Constance, Joan, Lady Fryer. For services, in the Eastern Region and at Headquarters, Women's Voluntary Services.
- Major Vernon James Garrow, Control Officer, Grade II, Control Commission for Germany (British Element).
- Peter Gaskell MIME, Assistant to Area General Manager, No. 2 (Wigan) Area, National Coal Board, North Western Division.
- Gerard Arthur George, chief executive officer, Ministry of Supply.
- William Charles Giles, Senior Staff Officer, Ministry of Fuel and Power.
- George Frederick Gilpin, Clerk to the Chairman of Ways and Means and Speaker's Counsel, House of Commons.
- Jack William Glare, Higher Executive Officer, Board of Inland Revenue.
- William Francis Glass, Principal Staff Officer, Air Ministry.
- Thomas Graham, Manager, Chace Industrial Hostel, Coventry.
- Frederick William Grebbell, lately District Inspector, Royal Ulster Constabulary.
- Kathleen Clare Greenhow. For public and social services in Guernsey.
- Ernest Geoffrey Greenwell, Officer-in-Charge, Manchester Juvenile Employment Bureau.
- Albert Edward Gregory, Higher Executive Officer, Commonwealth Relations Office.
- Augustus Algernon Grohmann MM, Interpreter, Grade A, Allied Commission for Austria (British Element).
- Richard Norman Hadwin, Chief Vibration Engineer, De Havilland Propeller Company.
- Francis Ernest Hale, Telephone Manager, Shrewsbury, General Post Office.
- William George Hall AMInstT, Traffic Manager, Eastern Counties Omnibus Company, Ltd.
- Edwin Walter Hallam, Technical Staff Officer, HM Stationery Office.
- Margaret Wilson Hamilton. For services as Secretary, Women's Friendly Society of Scotland.
- Oswald Hammond, Intelligence Officer, Grade II, Control Commission for Germany (British Element).
- Eric Hardy Harwood, Regional Commissioner, National Savings Committee, South Western Region.
- Walter John Hawker, Secretary, British Toy Manufacturers Association.
- Harold Hays, Senior Control Officer, Control Commission for Germany (British Element).
- Leonard Henry Hayward, Chief Inspector, Kolster Brandes Ltd., Foots Cray, Kent.
- Herford Heap, Chief Clerk, Westmorland County Education Committee.
- Arthur Henry Henbest, Staff Officer, Admiralty.
- Edward James Herad, Transport Officer to the Devon Agricultural Executive Committee.
- John Alphonsus Higgins, Clerk of the Rural District Council, Magherafelt, County Londonderry.
- Elizabeth Hodson JP, Trade Union Member of the North Western Regional Board for Industry. Chairman, Wigan Local Employment Committee.
- Lawrence Metcalfe Horwill, Assistant Chief Draughtsman, Yarrow and Company, Ltd., Scotstoun, Glasgow.
- Ann Marie Howes JP, Alderman Birmingham City Council.
- Harry Hudson, Chief Clerk, Royal Hospital, Chelsea.
- Erik Marshall Hughes, chief executive officer, North Midlands Region, Ministry of Fuel and Power.
- Ernest Jeffreys Humble JP, lately General Secretary, Liverpool Boy's Association.
- William Fleet Huson, Secretary, Southern Regional Roard for Industry.
- Barbara Olive Hutchinson, Administrative Officer, European Regional Office, United Nations Relief and Rehabilitation Administration.
- Major John Earle Huxley, lately Staff Officer, War Office.
- Arthur Llewellyn James, chairman, Llandrindod Wells Savings Committee.
- Charles Stanley Johnson, Honorary Secretary, Rutland Savings Committee.
- Lyelee Johnstone RRC, lately Matron, Sunshine Home for Blind Babies, East Grinstead.
- Alun Aneuryn Jones, managing director and Chairman of Directors, R. E. Jones and Brothers, Ltd., Conway.
- George Harry Edward Jones, Under-Manager, Sandwell Park Colliery, National Coal Board, West Midlands Division.
- Emeritus Professor John Share Jones MSc, FRCVS, Honorary Local Fuel Overseer, Wrexham Rural District Council.
- Agnes Mane Leonora Joyner, Superintendent, Nottingham County Nursing Federation.
- Harold Rear, deputy director, Building Materials, Ministry of Works.
- Henry Keeton, lately Staff Officer, Air Ministry.
- Thomas Kellie, Chief Mill Manager, W. G. Grant and Company Ltd., Dundee.
- John Richard Knight, Higher Executive Officer, Ministry of Pensions.
- George Eric Warner Lacey MB, BS, MRCS, LRCP, Admiralty Surgeon and Agent, Woolwich.
- Margaret Langdon, Regional Clothing Officer, Women's Voluntary Services, North Western Region.
- William Bibby Langford, Senior Executive Officer, Board of Trade.
- Thomas Wilkinson La Praik, Senior Traffic Officer, British European Airways Corporation.
- Quintin Young Lawson, Honorary Secretary, Strabane and District Savings Committee, County Tyrone.
- Robert James Lawson, Senior Executive Officer, General Post Office.
- Frank Trayton Levick. For services as secretary of The Farmers' Club.
- John Lewis, Senior Inspector, Ministry of Agriculture and Fisheries.
- Ernest Alexander Lowe, Secretary, Scottish Rural Workers Approved Society.
- Annie Lowrey, Matron, Queen Mary's (Roehampton) Hospital, Ministry of Pensions.
- Samuel James McCoubrey MM, Secretary, Sheet Metal Workers Trade Union in Northern Ireland.
- James McCreadie, Assistant Operating Superintendent, Railway Executive, Scottish Region.
- Richard James Gibson McCrudden MSc, Donor Panel Liaison Officer, National Blood Transfusion Service, South Western Region.
- Samuel Frank Chesney MacDonald, Staff Officer, Ministry of Home Affairs, Northern Ireland.
- Alexander Muir Mackenzie McGlashan, Higher Executive Officer, Department of Agriculture for Scotland.
- Eleanora MacGregor, Superintendent, Deaconess Hospital, Edinburgh.
- John McIntosh, Deputy Assistant Director of Army Contracts, War Office.
- John McIntyre, Acting Deputy Fire Force Commander, South West Area of Scotland.
- Daniel Mackay, Superintendent and Deputy Chief Constable, Inverness-shire Constabulary.
- William McKee, Flax Manager, Blackstaff Flax Spinning and Weaving Company, Ltd., Belfast.
- Peter McAlister McKelvie, Officer, Board of Customs and Excise.
- Kenneth Charles Baldwin Mackenzie, Honorary Secretary, Coffee Buyers' Association.
- David MacLennan, Member, Hill Farming Advisory Committee for Scotland.
- Thomas McMenemy, Member of the Executive Council, National Federation of Building Trades Operatives.
- Henry Madden, Trade Union Member of the Northern Regional Board for Industry.
- Samuel Kenneth Taubman Maddrell, Senior Area Officer, Liverpool, Ministry of Food.
- Councillor William Main JP, chairman, Fife Savings Committee.
- William John George Maloney, Technical Assistant and Film Librarian, HM Stationery Office.
- Christopher David Esmé Marney, Regional Petroleum Officer, North Western Region, Ministry of Fuel and Power.
- William Bath Marsh, Senior Executive Officer, Ministry of Health.
- Frederick Frank Marshall, Chief Designer, Royal Aircraft Establishment, Farnborough.
- Frederick George Martin, Office Manager, Amalgamated Engineering Union.
- Thomas Henry Martin, Bristol and District Secretary, National Union of Tailors and Garment Workers.
- Ivy Sue Mason, European Executive Chairman, Foster Parents Plan for War Children.
- Percy Maynard, Senior Executive Officer, Colonial Office.
- Elizabeth Black Meiklejohn, Superintendent of Typists, Department of Health for Scotland.
- Elizabeth Rosamund Meredith, National and Midland Region Clothing Storekeeper, Women's Voluntary Services.
- Thomas Midgley, Staff Clerk, Ministry of Labour and National Service.
- John Miller, Honorary Secretary of Thurso Lifeboat Station.
- Walter Henry Mills, Assistant Secretary, Railway Executive.
- Alexander Moore, Deputy Principal Officer, Ministry of Commerce, Northern Ireland.
- Arthur Moore, lately Secretary-Superintendent, Lincoln County Hospital.
- Thomas Frederick Moore, Superintendent, Mercantile Marine Office Stores, Ministry of Transport.
- Nathan Wilfred Morrison, Commandant, Leeds Special Constabulary.
- Janet Mathieson Morton, Higher Executive Officer, Ministry of Food.
- Cyril Robert Moss, Chief Sanitary Inspector and Chief Salvage Officer, Borough of Brighouse, Yorkshire.
- Frank William Mugridge, Higher Executive Officer, Ministry of Supply.
- Alistair Munro, President, British Friesian Society.
- Robert Naylor, chairman, Darlington, Auckland and District War Pensions Committee.
- William Newsham, Manager, Bournemouth Employment Exchange, Ministry of Labour and National Service.
- Harry Helstrip Nicholson MA, University Lecturer in the School of Agriculture, Cambridge.
- Observer Commander John Reginald Nixon, Group Commandant, No. 18 Group, Royal Observer Corps, Essex.
- Albert Edward Noakes, Senior Executive Officer, War Damage Commission and Central Land Board.
- John Thomas O'Brien JP, Senior Estate Surveyor, Ministry of Works.
- Alderman Richard O'Dowd JP, Vice-chairman, Central Committee, British Iron and Steel Kindred Trades Association.
- James Oram JP, District House Coal Officer, Devizes and Trowbridge.
- Dorothy Wordsworth Ormiston, Higher Executive Officer, Foreign Office.
- Bertram Charles Osborne, Assistant District Auditor, Ministry of Health.
- Charles Henry Osbourn, Area Welfare Officer, London County Council.
- Edwin Leonard Parish, Senior Disposals Officer, Ministry of Supply.
- William Seymour Park, Clerk in charge of Litigation, Board of Trade.
- Leslie Parnwell, Head of Branch, Tithe Redemption Commission.
- Thomas Mitchell Paterson, Regional Training Officer, Ministry of Labour and National Service.
- William George Patterson, Deputy General Works Manager, Siemens Brothers and Company, Ltd., Woolwich.
- George Pear, Senior Staff Officer, Ministry of Agriculture and Fisheries.
- Muriel Ella Pearman, Senior Executive Officer, Ministry of National Insurance.
- Frederick Harry Pearn, Superintendent of Engineering Organisation, British Overseas Airways Corporation.
- William Eddington Peel, Works Superintendent, Fire Control Department, R. W. Crabtree and Sons, Ltd., Leeds.
- William Ethelbert Pennick, Chief Assistant (Accounts), Flax Control, Board of Trade.
- Donald Henry Perkins, Chief Development Engineer, Henry Hughes and Son, Ltd., Barkingside, Essex.
- Mary Cynthia Perry, lately Assistant to the Ministry of Transport Representative for India, Burma and Ceylon.
- Ernest William Pickrell, lately Superintendent, Letterpress Printing, Ordnance Survey.
- Dorothy May Pitt, Higher Clerical Officer, London Telecommunications Region, General Post Office.
- John Magnus Platt, Technical Manager, Instrument Department, Laurence Scott and Electromotors, Ltd.
- Doreen Mary Pooler. For services as Secretary, Transport Committee of the Cocoa, Chocolate and Sugar Confectionery Association.
- William Soden Pringle JP, Treasurer, Grenville Lodge, Independent Order of Odd Fellows (Manchester Unity) Friendly Society.
- William Provost, Alderman, Staffordshire County Council.
- George William Pyman, Horticultural Instructor for domestic gardening under the Middlesex County Council.
- Maureen Ransome, deputy director, Incorporated Soldiers', Sailors' and Airmen's Help Society, British Army of the Rhine.
- Francis Harold Reckitt, Area Cold Storage Officer, London and South Eastern Division, Ministry of Food.
- Augustus Cecil Reeve, Senior Executive Officer, HM Treasury.
- Samuel William Reeve, Officer Supervisor, Admiralty, Rawalpindi.
- John Thomas Rice JP, Sub-Area Manager, Area Headquarters, National Coal Board, East Midlands Division.
- Thomas Rich, Honorary Secretary, Ennerdale Rural District Savings Committee.
- Arthur Roberts, Senior Executive Officer, Air Ministry.
- Ethel Gertrude Winifred Roberts, Chief Superintendent of Typists, Ministry of Civil Aviation.
- Jane Roberts, Headmistress, Leinthall Earles School, Herefordshire.
- Alderman William Roberts JP, lately Secretary, Cambrian and Festiniog District, Independent Order of Odd Fellows (Manchester Unity) Friendly Society.
- David Robertson JP, Councillor, Dumfries County Council.
- Robert Cahoon Rodden, Honorary Secretary, Ballycastle and District Local Savings Committee, County Antrim.
- Felix Arthur Rogers, Director and Secretary of Trade Associations attached to the British Electrical and Allied Manufacturers' Association.
- Josephine Royston. For public and social services in the Isle of Man.
- Hermann Thomas Charles Runge, Principal Executive Officer, Metropolitan Police Offices.
- Major Reginald John Salmon, Army Welfare Entertainments Officer, County of Middlesex.
- Samuel Sanderson JP, lately Secretary, Card, Blowing and Ring Room Operatives Approved Society.
- James Richard Saunders, Senior Executive Officer, Office of the Procurator General and Treasury Solicitor.
- Arthur Yorke Saville AMIMechE, managing director, British Jeffrey-Diamond Ltd.
- George Searle, Higher Executive Officer, Home Office.
- Hubert Shaw AMIEE, Area Engineer, General Post Office, Blackburn.
- Martha Shaw, Member of the Women's Voluntary Services. For welfare service in Edinburgh.
- William George Shipway MC, lately Sub-District Manager, Ministry of Transport, and Transport Officer of the Wholesale Grocers' War-time Association.
- Percy George Shute, Assistant Malaria Officer, Ministry of Health.
- Rosabelle Lindesay Sinclair. For public services in Northern Ireland.
- Walter John Skinner, chairman, West London District Committee, London and South Eastern Regional Board for Industry.
- Alexander McKenzie-Smith, Chief Registrar, Commonwealth Relations Office.
- David William Smith, Assistant Inspector, Class I, Ministry of Supply.
- Ethel Winifred Smith, Higher Clerical Officer, Board of Trade.
- Frederick William Smith, Higher Executive Officer, Department of Scientific and Industrial Research.
- Isabella Reid Smith, Honorary Secretary of the Civil Service Savings Committee, Scotland.
- Gwenllian Winifred Smith. For services as County Secretary, Cornwall Branch, British Red Cross Society.
- The Reverend Griffith John Sparham, Director of Hibbert Houses, Middle East.
- Elsie Rosaline Spruce, Higher Executive Officer, Foreign Office (German Section).
- Robert William Stapleton, Superintendent and Deputy Chief Constable, Leicestershire County Police Force.
- Ethel May Stevens, Secretary, National Union for Insurance.
- Marjorie Alice Stevenson, Regional Organiser, Women's Voluntary Services, North Eastern Region.
- John Storrie JP. For services to the Trade Union Movement in the West of Scotland.
- John Richard Stratford MRCVS, Divisional Veterinary Officer, Ministry of Agriculture, Northern Ireland.
- John Henry Tributten JP, District Secretary, Hull, National Union of Seamen.
- Kate Taylor, Head Teacher, West End County Infants School, Aldershot.
- Douglas Edgar Terry, Higher Executive Officer, Commonwealth Relations Office.
- Weston Clarence Timmis JP, Member, Cheshire War Agricultural Executive Committee.
- George Maurice Tomlin AMIEE, Chief Development Engineer, Salford Electrical Instruments, Ltd.
- Alfred Charles Tourgis. For public and social services in Alderney.
- Maurice George Tozer, Secretary, National Institute of Agricultural Botany, Cambridge.
- Joan Esther Treble. Civil Assistant, War Office.
- George Richard Turner, HM Inspector of Taxes, Board of Inland Revenue.
- Edith Valsler, Staff Officer, Ministry of Education.
- William John Veale, Honorary Secretary, Gloucester County Committee, Air Training Corps.
- Charles Edward Walker MA, Member, Southern Region Business Training Committee, and Principal, Municipal College, Bournemouth.
- David Walker, Chief Draughtsman, Engine Department, Fairfield Shipbuilding and Engineering Company Ltd., Govan, Glasgow.
- Edward Albert Walker JP, chairman, Downham Market Savings Committee, Norfolk.
- Wilfred Walker JP, Member, Horsforth Urban District Council.
- Archibald Albert Ward. For services as Seamen's Welfare Officer, Ministry of Transport.
- George Edwin Warren, Honorary Secretary, Enniskillen Savings Committee, County Fermanagh.
- Mary Julia Waters, Staff Clerk, Ministry of Labour and National Service.
- Herbert Burston Webber, Assistant to the United Kingdom Trade Commissioner at Melbourne.
- Violet Welton, Secretary, Standing Conference of National Voluntary Youth Organisations.
- Wallace Bernard Western, Senior Assistant, Ministry of Fuel and Power.
- Bernard Francis Whitaker, Manager, Tilmanstone Colliery, National Coal Board, South Eastern Division.
- Mary Ethel Whitehorn, Director, Student Welfare Department, British Council.
- Joseph Twist Whittle JP, lately Member, Ormskirk Urban District Council, Lancashire.
- Evelyn Ethel Wilkinson, Staff Officer, Assistance Board.
- Amy Pollock Williams, Joint County Borough Organiser, Women's Voluntary Services, Portsmouth.
- Hubert Ernest Guy Williams, President, National Association of Administrators of Local Government Establishments.
- Hywel Maldwyn Williams. For services to the Welsh textile industry.
- Roland Livingston Wynn-Williams, Secretary of the Home Office Committee on the closing hours of shops.
- William Arthur Williams, Joint Secretary, Association of British Insecticide Manufacturers.
- John Quinton Williamson, Chief Education Officer, Forestry Commission.
- Stephen Edward Wills, employed in a Department of the Foreign Office.
- Albert Edward Wright, Chairman of Committee, No. 162 (Stockport) Squadron, Air Training Corps.
- Freda Mary Wyatt, Senior Executive Officer, Central Office of Information.
- Joseph Gilbert Yardley, Secretary, Bath and West and Southern Counties Society.
- Frederick Yeomans, Senior Executive Officer, Ministry of Pensions.

Diplomatic Service and Overseas List

- Khan Bahadur Wazirzadeh Abdul Ahad, British Pro-Consul at Shiraz.
- Stanley George Burt-Andrews, British Vice-Consul at Sofia.
- Leonard Lee Atkinson, Assistant in the Commercial Section of His Majesty's Legation at Helsingfors.
- Harold Ferguson Bateman, until recently British Vice-Consul at Barranquilla.
- Henry Clement Birtles, Archivist at His Majesty's Legation at Beirut.
- Maude Elizabeth Brooker, lately shorthand typist at His Majesty's Embassy at Stockholm.
- Alice Chisholm Brossard, lately Captain, Women's Transport Service (First Aid Nursing Yeomanry). For services in South-East Asia prior to 2 September 1945.
- Norman Cornelius Brown, British West Indian subject resident in Panama.
- William Henry Brown, British subject resident on the Island of Pines, Cuba.
- Cecil Miller Coutts, Commandant of Police, Sudan Government.
- Kathleen Enid Cowan, British subject resident in the Argentine Republic.
- Ronald Agnew Finlay, British Vice-Consul at Manila.
- Malcolm Gale, Assistant in the Commercial Section of His Majesty's Embassy at Santiago.
- Thomas Alexander Gibson, British subject until recently resident in Egypt.
- William Henry Alexander Gilman, Assistant in the Commercial Section of His Majesty's Embassy in Lisbon.
- Harold Wilfred Hawkyard, Detective Superintendent, C.I.D. Metropolitan Police Force, lately Assistant Chief in the British Police Mission to Greece.
- Anna Holdcroft. For services in the Information Department of His Majesty's Embassy in Moscow.
- Basil Henry Lermitte, British subject resident in the Persian Gulf.
- Margaret Sutherland Chalmers Liddell, British subject resident in the Sudan.
- Jane Primrose Gibson McLeod, Clerk at His Majesty's Embassy in Belgrade.
- Anthony Anastasius Petychakis, British Vice-Consul at Canea.
- Duncan McCunn Reid, British Vice-Consul at Puerto Plata.
- William Howard Spring, Archivist at His Majesty's Embassy at Bogota.
- Norah Eva Swan, British subject resident in Uruguay.
- Beatrice Mildred Wilson, Clerk in the British Information Services, New York.
- Robert Carteret Alsop, Deputy Registrar, Supreme Court, Newfoundland.
- John Hann Blackmore. For services in connexion with Shipping and Seal Fishery, Newfoundland.
- Annie Sophie Davies. For social services in connexion with St. Gabriel's Home for Children, Bulawayo, Southern Rhodesia.
- Anne Derry. For social welfare services during the war in connexion with Basutoland Branch of the Victoria League.
- Bernard John Middleton Foggin, MVO, Secretary to Governor, Southern Rhodesia, and Clerk to Executive Council.
- Mother Mary Gertrude Green, Provincial-Superior of North West Province of Order of the Nuns of St John of God, in the State of Western Australia.
- Winifred Howie, Secretary and Superintendent of District and Bush Nursing Society, State of South Australia.
- Florence Kelly, Founder and President of Army Nurses Fund, State of South Australia.
- Thomas Henry Theodore Nave. For services in cultural life of Adelaide, State of South Australia.
- Louisa O'Brien. For services to Red Cross and Fighting Forces Comforts Fund, State of South Australia.
- Cecily Mary Gertrude O'Brien, Matron, District Hospital, Zeehan, State of Tasmania.
- Robert Patterson, District Superintendent, Rhodesian Railways, Limited.
- Molly Rule. For public service in Department of Internment Camps, Southern Rhodesia.
- Fynn Frankfort Sepamla, Special Grade Clerk, Swaziland.
- Francis Edward Allen, Marine Insurance Officer, Crown Agents for the Colonies.
- Ralph Israel Augustus Aubee, Assistant Accountant, Public Works Department, Sierra Leone.
- Sybil Kathleen Batley, MRCS, LRCP, Medical Superintendent, Church Missionary Society, Onitsha, Nigeria.
- George Alexander Bonello, Confidential Clerk to the Governor of Malta.
- Helen Bridgewater. For services to Education as the Founder and Headmistress of the Excelsior private secondary school in Nevis, Leeward Islands.
- Mobaheer Burrenchobay, Joint Registrar of Co-operative Societies, Mauritius.
- John Edward Hillbrook Calvert, Supervisor of Technical Training, Uganda.
- Joseph Boardman Clark, Manager, Steel Bros. & Co. Ltd., Haifa, Palestine.
- Douglas Manson Roy Cobban, lately Assistant Public Information Officer (Press) in Palestine.
- John Cockett, lately Clerical Officer, Palestine Government Clerical Service.
- Arthur Cole, Town Inspector, Revenue Department, Gibraltar.
- Ascencio Olivet Chetano Francisco Soares d'Almeida, Assistant Accountant, Public Works Department, Kenya.
- Captain Rupert Dennison, MM, ARCM, Director of Music, Trinidad Police Force.
- Samuel Oppon Gaisle, Labour Officer, Gold Coast.
- Hugh Leslie Denham Gee, lately Acting Deputy Commissioner of Pnsons, Palestine.
- Joachim Alfred Gomes. For social welfare services in British Guiana.
- William Clement Goodman, Steward and Secretary, Barbados General Hospital, Barbados.
- Helen Haylett. For public services in Tanganyika.
- Cyril Oswald Jennings, European Building Inspector, Town Board, Kuala Lumpur, Federation of Malaya.
- Daniel Emanuel Ojumin Johnson, Administrative Officer, Grade IV, Nigeria.
- Eulalie Kelly. For welfare services in the Bahamas.
- Christopher Kendrick, Chief Health Inspector and Secretary, Central Board of Health, Fiji.
- Edward Charles Kerrison, lately Health Inspector, Hong Kong.
- Marjorie Verrall King, lately Private Secretary to the Chief Secretary, Palestine.
- Robert Aldric Kitching, Colonial Agricultural Service, Agricultural Officer, Gambia.
- Sinnathamby Kula Singham, First Legal Assistant, Attorney-General's Office, Federation of Malaya.
- Harry Lander, Chief Sanitary Inspector, Medical Department, Singapore.
- Lim Seng Kiang, lately Financial Assistant, Police Department, Singapore.
- Dorothea Kathleen McCarogher, Nursing Sister and Dispenser, Universities Mission to Central Africa, Zanzibar.
- Frederick Thomas Machin, Senior Forester, Kenya.
- William McKay. For welfare services in Nyasaland.
- Mwalimu Daudi Mfuko, Head Teacher and Pathologist, St. Andrew's College, Universities Mission to Central Africa, Dar es Salaam, Tanganyika.
- Ng Chak Wing, Chief Interpreter, Supreme Court, Hong Kong.
- William Thomas Alport Nicholson, AMIEE, Electrical Engineer, Suva Town Board, Fiji.
- Arthur Clifford Gentle Palmer, Federal Education Officer, Antigua, Leeward Islands.
- Dorothy Florence Pole, Principal of the Annie Walsh Memorial Girls' School, Church Missionary Society, Sierra Leone.
- Dinah Nita Quist. For public services in the Gold Coast.
- Haritim Cleanthous Sacada. For philanthropic services in Cyprus.
- Amy Louise Scott. For social services in Trinidad.
- Eliza Eleanor Smith, Headmistress, Jamestown Junior School, St. Helena.
- Robert Thomas Stevens, assistant director, Electricity and Telephones, Mauritius.
- William Trafford, Assistant Controller of Telecommunications, Posts and Telegraphs Department, Federation of Malaya.
- Herbert Raymond Webb, Senior Forester, Uganda.
- Thomas William Willis, JP, Treasurer, Turks and Caicos Islands, Jamaica.
- Abraham Claudius Willoughby, lately Assistant Superintendent of Police, Nigeria.
- Arthur Thomas Wood, Chief Inspector of Works, Public Works Department, Gold Coast.
- Abdul Qader Zoobaidi, Secretary and Chief Assessor, Aden Township Authority.

Honorary Members

- Abdurahamam bin Ali, Liwali of Tanga, Tanganyika.
- Mabel Marsh, Educational Adviser, Methodist Mission Schools, Malaya.
- James Obiora Ugboma, Collector of Customs and Excise, Nigeria.

=== Companions of Honour (CH) ===
- Walter John de la Mare LittD, LLD, DLitt, Poet.
- The Reverend Howell Elvet Lewis DD. For services to Welsh religious and social life and letters.
- The Right Hon. William Whiteley MP, Parliamentary Secretary to the Treasury since 1945. Joint Parliamentary Secretary to the Treasury, 1942–45. Member of Parliament for the Blaydon Division of Durham, 1922–31 and since 1935.

=== Royal Red Cross (RRC) ===
First Class

- Principal Matron Edith Mary Beatrice Dyson OBE, Queen Alexandra's Imperial Military Nursing Service.

Second Class

- Senior Sister Joan Howe, Queen Alexandra's Imperial Military Nursing Service.
- Violet Brand, Commandant, V.A.D.
- Sister Joan Mary Clarke, Princess Mary's Royal Air Force Nursing Service.

==== Bar to Royal Red Cross ====
- Chief Principal Matron Nellie Gertrude Rees RRC, Princess Mary's Royal Air Force Nursing Service.

=== Imperial Service Order (ISO) ===
Home Civil Service

- Henry Tweedale Ashworth MBE, MM, Senior Executive Officer, Colonial Office (Golders Green).
- George William Bayliss, Principal, Board of Customs and Excise (Hemel Hempstead, Herts.).
- John Archibald Bessant MC, Superintending Architect, Ministry of Works (Woodford, Essex).
- William Ernest Sinclair Brebner, Assistant Keeper, Sasines Office, Register House, Edinburgh.
- Charles Ernest Pelham Brooks DSc, Senior Principal Scientific Officer, Air Ministry (Ferring-on-Sea, Sussex).
- Robert Henry Burden MBE, DCM, chief executive officer, HM Treasury (East Sheen).
- James Frederick Danielli, chief executive officer, Ministry of National Insurance (Acton).
- Sidney Edwin Dudley, Assistant Chief Inspector, Immigration Branch, Home Office (Stoke Newington).
- Walter Cecil Fenwick MBE, deputy director of Contracts, Ministry of Supply (Buckhurst Hill, Essex).
- James Olliff Griffits, Clerk of the Lists, Supreme Court of Judicature (Epsom, Surrey).
- Ernest Wilfred Hoyle, Principal, Ministry of Labour and National Service (London).
- Oliver John Hubbert MBE, Deputy Chief Passport Officer, Foreign Office (Ilford, Essex).
- Samuel William Irwin ARCScI, Chief Inspector for Technical Education, Ministry of Education, Northern Ireland (Cultra, County Down).
- Harry Kidd, lately Principal Technical Officer, Ministry of Transport (Wimbledon).
- Arthur Knight, Senior Executive Officer, Ministry of Civil Aviation (Romford, Essex).
- Gerald William Large OBE, Director of Establishment and Accounts, National Savings Committee (Brighton, Sussex).
- Captain James Legg, Assistant Engineer-in-Chief, General Post Office (Surbiton, Surrey).
- Richard Henry Mares, lately Principal, Ministry of Agriculture and Fisheries (Kingsbury).
- Alfred Robert Moody, Regional Manager, Central Land Board and War Damage Commission (Leatherhead, Surrey).
- George William Clifford Norfolk, Principal, Ministry of Fuel and Power (Thorpe Bay, Essex).
- Horace John Nowlan MICE, Deputy Civil Engineer-in-Chief, Admiralty (Chislehurst, Kent).
- Oswald Garnet Reynolds MC, Deputy Master, Melbourne Branch of the Royal Mint (Melbourne, Australia.
- Francis Septimus Tredinnick, Controller of Stamps, Board of Inland Revenue (Purley, Surrey).
- Edward Melville Tuke, District Auditor, Ministry of Health (Leeds).
- Bernard Allan Tyson, Principal, lately Ministry of Food (now Ministry of Agriculture and Fisheries) (Walton-on-Thames, Surrey).

Dominion Civil Service

- Stanley George Blackman, Sheriff of the State of South Australia.
- Francis Edward Hulley, Provincial Native Commissioner for the Midlands, Southern Rhodesia.
- Hubert Ambrose Solly. For service in Treasury, Engineering and Water Supply Departments, State of South Australia.
- Francis Grylls Steere, Clerk of the Legislative Assembly, State of Western Australia.
- Sydney Arnold Taylor, Public Service Commissioner, State of Western Australia.

Colonial Civil Service

- Stuart Thomas Crampton, Chief Accountant, Nigerian Railway.
- James Erik Hamilton DSc, Government Naturalist, Falkland Islands.
- James Le Cato Lightbourn, Auditor of Public Accounts, Bahamas.
- Wellesley Trevelyan Lord, Assistant Commissioner of Lands and Mines, British Guiana.
- Roy Sidney Martinez, lately Commissioner of Lands, Jamaica.
- Herbert Raymond Senior, Colonial Postal Service, Deputy Postmaster-General of the Gold Coast.
- Thomas Alvin Thompson, Inspector and Superintendent of Schools in the Bahamas.

=== British Empire Medal (BEM) ===
==== Military Division ====
Royal Navy

- Chief Petty Officer Writer William Edward Winnington Blair.
- Chief Petty Officer Vernon Frank Cable.
- Sick Berth Chief Petty Officer George Henry China.
- Engine Room Artificer Third Class Roy Claude Mourton Cooper.
- Sergeant William Dykes, Royal Marines.
- Sergeant Frederick William Evans, Royal Marines.
- Staff Sergeant Thomas William Patrick Franks, Royal Marines.
- Chief Petty Officer Frederick Gordon Harvey.
- Petty Officer Wren Mary Lilian Hubbard, Women's Royal Navy Service.
- Petty Officer John Hunt.
- Chief Petty Officer Ernest Frederick Jerrum.
- Petty Officer Hugh Lloyd Jones.
- Petty Officer Telegraphist Leslie Collier Jones.
- Chief Electrician Maurice William Last.
- Colour Sergeant John Lees, Royal Marines.
- Petty Officer Frederick Little.
- Chief Petty Officer (Air Mechanic) Christopher Frederick Mutton.
- Petty Officer Stoker Mechanic William Nagle.
- Air Artificer Fourth Class James Edwin Pratt.
- Marine Ronald Percy Ryalls, Royal Marines.
- Sick Berth Chief Petty Officer John Derek Sharples.
- Air Artificer Third Class Nicholas Charles Rupert Sinnott.
- Chief Electrical Artificer Sidney Taylor Smith.
- Stores Chief Petty Officer Ronald Stewart.
- Chief Motor Mechanic Third Class Frederick William Ernest Terry.
- Electrician James Thomson.
- Chief Petty Officer Frederick George Watson.
- Petty Officer John Sidney Wigley.

In recognition of Operational Minesweeping service since the end of the war.

- Leading Telegraphist Frank Gordon Jones.
- Chief Engine Room Artificer Fred Shepherd.

Army

- Sergeant Geoffrey Frank Adams, Corps of Royal Engineers.
- Staff Sergeant Jane Atkinson, Auxiliary Territorial Service.
- Sergeant Clarence Blake, Royal Electrical and Mechanical Engineers.
- Driver Edward Reginald Frank Boxall, Royal Army Service Corps.
- Sergeant Thomas William Burrell, Royal Artillery, Territorial Army.
- Staff Sergeant Harry Capener, Royal Army Service Corps, Territorial Army.
- Staff Sergeant Alfred Carrott, Royal Regiment of Artillery.
- Sergeant Ernest Victor Cotton, The Somerset Light Infantry (Prince Albert's).
- Staff Sergeant Frederick Davenport, Royal Army Service Corps.
- Sergeant Richard Dawe, Royal Electrical and Mechanical Engineers.
- Battery-Sergeant-Major Garuba Dikwar, Royal West African Frontier Force.
- Sergeant William James Dobson, Irish Guards.
- Sergeant Frank Goble, Grenadier Guards.
- Staff Sergeant John Hartley, Corps of Royal Engineers.
- Corporal Mabel Campbell Harvey, Auxiliary Territorial Service.
- Regimental Sergeant Major Ali Hassan, The King's African Rifles.
- Sergeant Doris Mary Hersey, Auxiliary Territorial Service.
- Sergeant Ronald Arthur Holland, Royal Electrical and Mechanical Engineers.
- Staff Sergeant Mohamed Hussein, East African Electrical and Mechanical Engineers.
- Colour Sergeant Ivan Hugh Jackson, The Royal Hampshire Regiment.
- Staff Sergeant Davidina Catherine Jardine, Auxiliary Territorial Service.
- Staff Sergeant George Jeffries, Corps of Royal Engineers.
- Staff Sergeant Patrick Terence Kenna, Royal Army Service Corps.
- Staff Sergeant Ida Lee, Auxiliary Territorial Service.
- Sergeant Albert Samuel Lloyd, Royal Regiment of Artillery.
- Sergeant John James Maudsley, Royal Army Service Corps.
- Corporal Henry McGuinness, The King's Own Royal Regiment (Lancaster).
- Staff Sergeant Stanley Charles Mills, Royal Regiment of Artillery.
- Staff Sergeant Ivor Morgans, Royal Army Service Corps.
- Battery-Sergeant-Major Stephen Nzioka Ngolo, East Africa Artillery.
- Sergeant Sidney Okoroafor, Royal West African Frontier Force.
- Corporal Dennis Charles Page, Royal Army Service Corps.
- Warrant Officer Class II Charles Howard Fairfax Price, Royal Army Ordnance Corps.
- Private John Rafferty, The King's Regiment (Liverpool).
- Sergeant Beatrice Amy Rawson, Auxiliary Territorial Service.
- Warrant Officer Class II Francis Loyola Robbins, Royal Army Service Corps.
- Corporal Noel Lindsay Robertson, Royal Corps of Signals.
- Sergeant John McWhirter Ross, Royal Corps of Signals.
- Fusilier George William Henry Skinner, The Royal Scots Fusiliers.
- Sergeant John Thompson, Royal Army Medical Corps.
- Lance-Corporal Alexander John Thorne, Royal Army Service Corps.
- Lance-Bombardier Josiah William Turner, Royal Regiment of Artillery.
- Staff Sergeant Laurence Bernard David Webb, Royal Army Ordnance Corps.
- Staff Sergeant William Anthony Whatling, Royal Tank Regiment.
- Staff Sergeant Arthur Herbert Lee Whitehead, Royal Regiment of Artillery.
- Sergeant Sidney Thomas Whitehead, Welsh Guards.
- Warrant Officer Class II Dennys Oliver Willcox, Corps of Royal Engineers.
- Warrant Officer Class II Robert Wilson, Corps of Royal Engineers.
- Corporal Gordon Wiltshire, The Welch Regiment.
- Sergeant William Henry George Withey, Corps of Royal Engineers.

Royal Air Force

- Flight Sergeant Richard Alderson.
- Flight Sergeant George Blore.
- Flight Sergeant Thomas Lillywhite.
- Flight Sergeant William James Macleod.
- Flight Sergeant Thomas Spencer James Nixon.
- Flight Sergeant Harold Edward Pike.
- Flight Sergeant William Charles Rendell.
- Flight Sergeant Reginald Wright.
- Acting Flight Sergeant Robert Bernard Waite, Royal Air Force Volunteer Reserve.
- Sergeant Robert Leslie Allen.
- Sergeant Gerald Corbett Bateman.
- Sergeant Reginald Booth.
- Sergeant Robert David Bune.
- Sergeant John Christopher Keenan.
- Sergeant William Vass Milne.
- Sergeant Harold Phoenix.
- Sergeant William Victor Rowe.
- Sergeant Richard Clive Scotson.
- Sergeant Francis Matthews Shirtliff.
- Sergeant Thomas Alexander Wright, Royal Air Force Volunteer Reserve.
- Pilot II Henry Edward Arthur Hurn.
- Corporal Wilfrid George Duffin.
- Corporal Eric Fred Spiers Pullen.
- Corporal Leonard John Smith.
- Corporal Ivor George Albert White.
- Corporal Frank Wilkins.
- Leading Aircraftman Charles Edward Evans.
- Aircraftman 1st Class Kenneth William Seago, Royal Air Force Volunteer Reserve.
- Flight Sergeant Kitty Parmiter Hawkins, Women's Auxiliary Air Force.
- Flight Sergeant Dorothy Anita Pulham, Women's Auxiliary Air Force.
- Sergeant Doris Eileen Hester, Women's Auxiliary Air Force.

==== Civil Division ====
United Kingdom

- Nancy Mary Abbott, Deputy County Borough Organiser, Women's Voluntary Services, Oxford City.
- Samuel Frederick Alder, Skilled Workman, Class I, Post Office Engineering Department, Gloucester.
- Thomas Emmanuel Armitage, Miner, Wharnicliffe Silkstone Colliery, National Coal Board, North Eastern Division (High Green, Sheffield).
- William Arnott, Master at Arms, SS Empress of Australia, Canadian Pacific Steamships Ltd. (Glasgow).
- Thomas Ashcroft, Maintenance Superintendent, Bristol Haulage Company (Weston-super-Mare, Somerset).
- Joshua Atherton, Laying-up Machine Operator, British Insulated Callenders Cables Ltd., Prescot (Warrington, Lancs.).
- Frank Campbell Aylesbury, Principal Foreman, Royal Aircraft Establishment, Farnborough, Hampshire.
- Alfred Bailies, Metal Man, Bersham Colliery, National Coal Board, North Western Division (Wrexham, Denbighshire).
- Walter Barber, Foreman Pattern Maker, Easterbrook Allcard & Company Ltd. (Stannington, Sheffield).
- Harold Herbert Barnett DCM, MM, Overseer, Regional Director's Office, London Postal Region (Morden, Surrey).
- John Bartlett, lately Depot Storeholder, Ministry of Supply Storage Depot, Glamorgan (Neath, Glam).
- Ben Bassett, Farm Worker, Sherburn, Malton, Yorkshire.
- Albert Charles Beall, Postal and Telegraph Officer, Northern District Office (Highbury).
- Louis Henry Bearne, Sub-Divisional Inspector, Metropolitan Police Force (London).
- Walter Edmund Bell, Clerk of Works, Royal Air Force Station, Waddington, Lincolnshire.
- Ada Bennett, Cotton Weaver, Thomas Moss & Sons Ltd. (Preston, Lancs.).
- Joseph Bennett, Pram and Erection Shaft Foreman, Tan Sad Ltd. (Perry Barr, Birmingham).
- Adolphus Bickham, Radio Overseer, Royal Air Force Southern Signals Area, Newbury (Welford, Berks).
- William A. Biggs, Honorary Representative of St Dunstan's in Leicester.
- David Alexander Black, Quartermaster, SS Maldan, T. & J. Brocklebank Ltd. (Dundee).
- Henry M. Black, Haulage Engineman, No. 3 Beoch Colliery, National Coal Board, Scottish Division (Dalmellington, Ayrshire).
- George William Boreham DCM, Regimental Sergeant Major, Dulwich College Junior Training Corps (Dulwich).
- Alexander Boyes, Inspector (Postal), Head Post Office, Glasgow (Bearsden, Glasgow).
- Albert Brain, Overman, Kingsbury Colliery, National Coal Board, West Midlands Division (Wilnecote, Staffs.).
- Frederick Bramham, Head Foreman Machines, Vickers-Armstrongs Ltd. (Barrow-in-Furness, Lancs.).
- Edward Thomas Brennan, Cable Foreman, HM Cable Ship Monarch, General Post Office (Woolwich).
- Harry George Brewster, Compositor and Deputy Storekeeper, Railway Executive, Eastern Region (Romford, Essex).
- Charles Herbert Brill, Assistant Foreman of Carpenters, R.N. Armament Depot, Woolwich (Plumstead).
- Gerald Brown, Barrack Warden, Royal Air Force Station, Hendon.
- David Cairns, Stripper, Polmaise 3/4 Colliery. National Coal Board, Scottish Division (Fallin, Stirling).
- Annie Mary Carrington, Workroom Overlooker J. Fearfield Ltd. (Sandiacre, Nottingham).
- Ethel Jane Carter, Sub-Postmistress, Langrish Sub-Office, Petersfield, Hampshire.
- Harold Horace Clark, Warrant Officer, No. 176 (Hove) Squadron, Air Training Corps (Hove, Sussex).
- Sidney Ernest Clarke, Organiser of Savings Group, York Street Flax Spinning Company Ltd., Belfast.
- William George Clarke, Senior Ambulance Driver, Worcester and District Ambulance Service (Worcester).
- Elsie Cochrane, Centre Organiser, Women's Voluntary Services, Selby, Yorkshire.
- Sidney Charles Cocks, Coach Finisher, Gloucester Railway Car & Wagon Company Ltd. (Gloucester).
- Frank Collins, Reconstruction Chargeman, Lofthouse Colliery, National Coal Board, North Eastern Division (Leeds).
- Alfred Cook, Works Inspector, Railway Executive, Eastern Region (Woodford Green, Essex).
- Frederick William Cook, General Foreman, Kodak Ltd. (Bushey, Herts.).
- Frederick Cotterill, Organiser, Tamworth & District Wounded Soldiers Entertainment Committee (Tamworth, Staffs.).
- Cecil William Creber, Chargeman of Engine Fitters, HM Dockyard, Devonport (Plymouth).
- Henry Edwin Thomas Clover, Skilled Workman, Class I, Larkswood Telephone Exchange (Walthamstow, London).
- Evelyn Louise Crowe, Assistant Supervisor, Class II, Wanstead Telephone Exchange (Woodford Green, Essex).
- Robert N. Dalgleish MC, Head Messenger, Offices of the Cabinet and Department of the Prime Minister, Northern Ireland (Belfast).
- Stanley Knott Davidson, Head Foreman Shipwright, R. & W. Hawthorn Leslie & Company Ltd. (Wallsend-on-Tyne, Northumberland).
- Albert Dawes, Overman, Primrose Hill (Fleakingley Beck) Colliery, National Coal Board, North Eastern Division (Woodlesford, Leeds).
- Charles Dawson, General Labourer and Scaffolder, Ministry of Works Depot, Bristol (Easton, Bristol).
- Elizabeth Day, Member, Women's Land Army, Bedfordshire.
- Patrick de Souza, Barrack Store Accountant, War Office Department, Singapore.
- Frederick Ernest Dicker, Principal Foreman of Stores, No. 14 Maintenance Unit, Royal Air Force Carlisle, Cumberland.
- Alfred George Dickinson, Station Officer, HM Coastguard, Fairlight, Sussex.
- Walter James Diggins, Telephone Mechanic, Factories Department, General Post Office (Kingsbury).
- Maud E. Dunn, Honorary Organiser and Collector, Mevagissey Savings Group, Cornwall.
- Henry Hugh Edwards, Regimental Sergeant Major, Canford School Junior Training Corps (Wimborne, Dorset).
- Denis Stevens Elvin, Assistant Workshop Officer, Military Engineering Experimental Establishment, Ministry of Supply (Christchurch, Hants.).
- Phillippa Ethel Ethelston, Voluntary Canteen Worker, Shrewsbury.
- Jean Featherstone, Head Nursery Attendant, Holgate Institution, Middlesbrough, Yorkshire.
- Hugh Fenner, Organiser and Collector, Villages Savings Group, Capel St. Mary, Suffolk.
- Gladys Naura Clarissa Strange-Fergus, Billeting Officer for Women's Voluntary Services, Glasgow.
- Michael Fitzpatrick, Dataller, Mains Colliery, National Coal Board, North Western Division (Ashton-in-Makerfield, Lancs.).
- John Oliver French, Foreman, Gypsum Mines Ltd. (Robertsbridge, Sussex).
- William Frost, Head Messenger, Northern Area Branch, HM Stationery Office (Manchester).
- John Henry Gale, Factory Foreman, Dried Milk Products Ltd., Johnstown, Carmarthenshire.
- Patrick Garrity, lately Telephone Operator, British Legion (Purley Oaks, Surrey).
- Sidney Albert Giles, Temporary Foreman, Royal Ordnance Factory, Woolwich (Welling, Kent).
- John Moore Glaister, Chargehand Fitter, Robert Stephenson Hawthorn Ltd. (Darlington, Co. Durham).
- Robert Gold, Oncost Worker, Douglas Castle Colliery, National Coal Board, Scottish Division (Douglas, Lanarkshire).
- Charles Graham Goodwin, Honorary Collector, Tickhill Savings Group, Doncaster, Yorkshire.
- George Gould, Colliery Overman, Norton Hill Colliery, National Coal Board, South Western Division (Midsomer Norton, Somerset).
- Kathleen Gracey, Centre Organiser, Women's Voluntary Services, Seaton Urban District (Seaton, Devon).
- Frank Gratrix, Moulder, Royal Ordnance Factory, Patncroft (Eccles, Lancs.).
- Charles James Greenaway, lately Superintendent of Works, Houses of Parliament, Ministry of Works (Sutton, Surrey).
- Ann Greep, Burgh Organiser, Women's Voluntary Services, Prestonpans, East Lothian.
- William George Percival Guest, Permanent Chargeman of Shipwrights, HM Dockyard, Sheerness (Sittingbourne, Kent).
- Charles Halford, Chargeman Stone Ripper, Mansfield Colliery, National Coal Board, East Midlands Division (Mansfield Woodhouse, Notts.).
- Thomas George Hall, Checkweighman, Snowdon Colliery, National Coal Board, South Eastern Division (Aylesham, Kent).
- Elizabeth Hortense Hammond. For services to the Women's Voluntary Services Centre, Westminster (London).
- Edward Alfred Harris, Supervisor of Canteen, Chiswick Works, London Transport Executive (Brentford, Middlesex).
- John Richard Harris, Chief Divisional Inspector, Railway Executive, Western Region (Ely, Cardiff).
- Stanley Harrison, Chief Petty Officer, Attenborough Unit, Sea Cadet Corps (Beeston, Notts.).
- James Hawton, Electric Crane Driver, Railway Executive, Southern Region (Millbrook, Southampton).
- Arthur Head, Office Keeper, Ministry of Town and Country Planning (Chelsea).
- Mary Hesp, Member of the Women's Voluntary Services. For services with the Forces in India.
- John Montague Hill, Depot Manager, House Coal Scheme, Brighton, Sussex.
- Robert John Hollis, Mechanic, Signals Research & Development Establishment, Ministry of Supply (Christchurch, Hants.).
- Arthur George Holmes, Chief Officer, Class II, HM Prison, Dartmoor.
- Henry Joshua Hore, Acting Senior Draughtsman, Admiralty (South Norwood).
- Harry Horner, Craftsman, Chiswick Works, London Transport Executive (Southall, Middlesex).
- Viola Madge Huband, Member of Women's Land Army, Swindon, Wiltshire.
- Elsie Lilian Hughes, Member of Women's Land Army, Bodmin, Cornwall.
- Ernest Harold Hunter, Senior Superintendent of Works (Engineering), Ministry of Works (London).
- Charles Hustwit, Tool Room Foreman, Scotts Motors (Saltaire) Ltd. (Shipley, Yorks.).
- Joseph. Ingram, Inspector (Postal), Head Post Office, Coventry (Canley, Warwickshire).
- Richard Ivey MM, Chief Inspector, War Department Constabulary (Chilwell, Notts.).
- George Albert Edward Jeffrey. Chargehand, Stowmarket Factory, Imperial Chemical Industries Ltd. (Stowmarket, Suffolk).
- George Jeffreys, Warrant Officer, No. 345 (City of Lancaster) Squadron, Air Training Corps (The Marsh, Lancs.).
- James Jennings, Greaser, SS Georgic, Cunard White Star Ltd. (Liverpool).
- Ethel Wyn Griselda Jewell, Canteen Manageress, Radar Research & Development Establishment, Ministry of Supply, Malvern (Barnstaple, Devon).
- Albert Westwood Johnson, Foreman, General Electric Company (Great Barr, Birmingham).
- James Kelly, Coal Cutter, Greenside Colliery, National Coal Board, Northern Division (Ryton, Co Durham).
- Edwin Kenley, Barrack Store Accountant, War Office Department, Cyprus.
- William Rathie Kerr, District Inspector, Railway Executive, Scottish Region (Edinburgh).
- Andrews King, Timekeeper, Newcraighall Colliery, National Coal Board, Scottish Division (Musselburgh, Midlothian).
- Florence King, Cone Drawer, Salts (Saltaire) Ltd. (Shipley, Yorks.).
- Henry Alfred Kirby, Head Fireman, Central Ammunition Depot, War Office, Bramley (Basingstoke, Hants.).
- John Edward Larby, Established Messenger, Ministry of Supply (Paddington).
- Hector Thomas Lawrence, Inspector of Engine Fitters, HM Norfolk Flax Establishment (King's Lynn, Norfolk).
- James Liesnham, Assistant Superintendent, Ordnance Survey Office (Chessington, Surrey).
- Gladys Lodge, Clothing Officer, Women's Voluntary Services, Leeds County Borough (Leeds).
- Dorothy Jane Lovegrove, Assistant Telephone Supervisor, Posts and Telecommunications Branch, Control Commission for Germany.
- Walter Frederick Lowe, Coal Face Worker, Sherwood Colliery, National Coal Board, East Midlands Division (Mansfield Woodhouse, Notts.).
- Mark Cornwall Lower, Jointer, Submarine Cables Ltd., Greenwich (London).
- William Martin Rouse Luscombe, Detective Officer attached to R.M. Police, Plymouth Area (Stoke, Plymouth).
- Walter Luxton, Permanent Way Inspector (Class 3), Railway Executive, Southern Region (Swaythling, Southampton).
- Peter Neill Mackellar, Senior Established Messenger, Scotland Office, Ministry of National Insurance (Edinburgh).
- Archibald McLean, Chemical Process Worker, Imperial Chemical Industries Ltd. (Grangetown, Yorks.).
- Anna Magee, Assistant Supervisor, Class II, Post Office Telephone Exchange, Bangor, Co. Down (Belfast).
- Margaret Malraison, Assistant Supervisor, Class I, Post Office Telephone Exchange, South Park (Sevenoaks, Kent).
- Alfred Markins, Night Supervisor, James Ferguson Ltd. (Poplar).
- David Maule, Head of Finishing and Despatching Department, James Scott & Sons (Dundee).
- William Fray Mayne, Iron Moulder, Holman Bros. Ltd. (Camborne, Cornwall).
- Ernest Edward Merritt, lately Senior Draughtsman, Admiralty (New Eltham).
- Herbert Metcalfe, Face Worker, Crigglestone Colliery, National Coal Board, North Eastern Division (Wakefield, Yorks.).
- Katherme Campbell Milne, Domestic Worker, Glasgow Royal Infirmary (Glasgow).
- James Milroy, Dairyman Cheesemaker, Urrbank, Bridge of Urr, Castle Douglas (Kirkcudbright).
- Fred Moiser, District Inspector, Railway Executive, North Eastern Region (Stockton-on-Tees, Co. Durham).
- William Morley, Haulage Worker, Babbington Colliery, National Coal Board, East Midlands Division (Ilkeston, Derby).
- Frank Morris, Warehouseman, Post Office Stores Department, Kew (Southgate).
- Margaret Jane Nash, Scale Payment Sub-Postmistress, Bodfor Terrace, Aberdovey, Merioneth.
- Emily Nield, Slubber tenter, Clover, Croft & Slate Ltd. (Rochdale, Lancs.).
- Edith Maud Nixon, Clothing Officer, Women's Voluntary Services, County of London (New Eltham, Kent).
- Patrick Charles O'Neill, Stores Assistant, Office of the Receiver for the Metropolitan Police District (London).
- William Orr, Foreman, Olive & Partington Ltd. (Glossop, Derby).
- George Paget, Repairer, Lewis Merthyr Colliery, National Coal Board, South Western Division (Cilfynydd, Glamorgan).
- Florence Parley JP, Centre Organiser, Women's Voluntary Services, Newark Borough (Newark, Notts.).
- Alfred William Parnell, Fitter, Motive Power Department, Railway Executive, London Midland Region (Bordesley Green, Birmingham).
- Ernest Rogers Parrish, Office Keeper, Savings Department, General Post Office (Hounslow, Middlesex).
- Henry Payne, Acting Senior Foreman of Storehouses, R.N. Store Depot, Copenacre (Chippenham, Wilts.).
- Thomas Pedley, Chargehand, Josiah Wedgwood Ltd. (Stoke-on-Trent, Staffs.).
- William Philipps, Chief Foreman, Repairer's Shops, Victoria and Albert Museum (South Kensington).
- Thomas Frederick Polley, Office Keeper in a Department of the Foreign Office (London).
- Frank Potter, Foreman, Ministry of Transport (Norwich, Norfolk).
- Horace Southam Privett, Map Mounter, Tithe Redemption Commission (Croydon, Surrey).
- George Albert Proctor, Technician, Post Office Engineering Depot (Sheffield, Yorks.).
- Florence Beatrice Kathleen Rawlings, Woman Inspector, Bristol City Police (Bristol, Glos.).
- Reginald Thomas Reed, Chief Officer, Class I, HM Prison, Dartmoor.
- Alice Ridley, Centre Organiser, Women's Voluntary Services, Gainsborough Urban District (Gainsborough, Lincs.).
- Thomas Riley, Foreman Bank Ranger, Docks and Inland Waterways Executive (Afram, Lancs.).
- Alexander Robertson, Goods Guard, Railway Executive, Scottish Region (Blair Atholl, Perthshire).
- Rose Ann Rose, Flax Spinner, South Mills Ltd. (Dundee).
- John Ryan, Fireman, Wilsontown Colliery, National Coal Board, Scottish Division (Wilsontown, Lanarkshire).
- Walter William Ryle, Office Keeper, Grade II, HM Treasury (Islington, N.I.).
- Ann M. Sadler, Centre Organiser, Women's Voluntary Services, Stanley Urban District and Lanchester Rural District (Lanchester, Co. Durham).
- William George Seller MM, Inspector (Engineering), Temple Bar Telephone Exchange, General Post Office (Sutton, Surrey).
- Thomas Shaw, Underground Dataller, Victoria Colliery, National Coal Board, West Midlands Division (Stoke-on-Trent, Staffs.).
- Richard Shears, Assistant Superintendent, Royal Courts of Justice (Norbury).
- Henry Edmund Sheffield, Head Draughtsman, Air Ministry (Stanmore, Middlesex).
- Terence Edward Shield, Coal Hewer, Dean and Chapter Colliery, National Coal Board, Northern Division (Ferryhill, Co. Durham).
- Milly Sigsworth, Member, Women's Land Army, Worksop, Notts.
- Elsie Sinnock, Cook, Chailey Public Assistance Institution, East Sussex (Cooksbridge, Sussex).
- Esthpr Ada Smith, Head Attendant, Female House Wards, Boundary House (Public Assistance Institution), Derby.
- Charles William Smith, Engineering Superintendent, British Overseas Airways Corporation.
- Frederick Charles Smith, Seniou Examiner, Staff of the Admiralty Gunnery Engineer Overseer, Southern Area (Dartford, Kent).
- Robert Henry Spencer, Painter, Building Research Station, Department of Scientific and Industrial Research (Watford, Herts.).
- Margaret Anne Stack, Supervisor, British Enka Ltd. (Bootle, Liverpool).
- Russell James Stannard, Superintendent-Nightwatchman, European Regional Office, United Nations Relief and Rehabilitation Administration (London).
- Frederick Starkey, Pithead Bath Attendant, Orgreave Colliery, National Coal Board, North Eastern Division (Sheffield, Yorks.).
- Elsie Ruth Stonelake, Deputy Centre Organiser, Women's Voluntary Services, St. Pancras (London).
- Alexander Straughan, Locomotive Driver, Railway Executive, North Eastern Region (Gateshead, Co. Durham).
- Elsie Grant-Suttie. For services to the North Berwick Townswomen's Guild (North Berwick, East Lothian).
- Frances Winifred Swan, Collector, Savings Group, Coventry (Warwick).
- Edith Marian Swarbrick, Overseer, Darwen Post Office (Blackburn, Lancs.).
- Reginald Henry Tankins, Maintenance Fitter, Southern Command, War Office (Salisbury, Wilts.).
- Peter Taylor, Foreman, Ministry of Transport (Wetherby, Yorks.).
- Walter Edward Taylor, Acting Assistant II, HM Underwater Detection Establishment (Portland, Dorset).
- Osborne William Tew, lately Passenger Guard, Railway Executive, London Midland Region (Hatch End, Middlesex).
- Constance Thompson, Area Orgarnser, Women's Voluntary Services (Pontefract, Yorks.).
- Frederick William Tranter, Physical Training Supervisor, Industrial Rehabilitation Centre (Egham, Surrey).
- Ethel Trim, Canteen Manageress, N.A.A.F.I (Whitchurch, Cardiff).
- Elizabeth Stewart Turfus, Temporary Postwoman, Edinburgh.
- Christina Mary Turner, Honorary Collector, Street Savings Group (Dorking, Surrey).
- Luther Henry Walters, Chargeman of Port Signalmen, Admiralty Central Signal Station (Copnor, Portsmouth).
- Adelaide Victoria Walton, Superintendent of Cleaners, Ministry of National Insurance (Acton).
- William Truman Wappett, Electrical Wireman, 1 Dunston Power Station, North Eastern Electric Supply Company Ltd. (Gateshead, Co. Durham).
- William Henry Watkin, Supervisor, South Kirby Colliery, National Coal Board, North Eastern Division (Pontefract, Yorks.).
- Kathleen Agnes Watson, Member, Women's Land Army, Glamorganshire (Cardiff).
- Stephen Weatherston, Chargeman Shipwright, Swan Hunter & Wigham Richardson Ltd. (Wallsend-on-Tyne, Northumberland).
- Alexander Blackie Weir, Head Forester, Kielder Forest (Hexham, Northumberland).
- Frederick Edwin Welford, Superintendent of Stores, No. 7 Maintenance Unit, Royal Air Force (Quedgeley, Glos.).
- Joseph Westwood, Jr., Senior Company Officer, Fire Staff, Scottish Home Department (Kirkcaldy, Fife).
- Thomas Henry Wheatley, Warehouseman, Egg Department, I. Beer and Sons Ltd. (Leytonstone).
- Elsie Wightman, Housemaid, Nurses' Home, Stepping Hill Hospital, Stockport (Levershulme, Manchester).
- John Williams, Head Foreman Patternmaker, Cammell Laird & Company Ltd., Birkenhead (Babbington, Cheshire).
- Thomas John Williams, Honorary Organiser and Collector, Collieries Savings Group (Neath, Glamorganshire).
- Thomas Llewellyn Williams, Foreman Electrician, Harland & Wolff Ltd. (Belfast).
- William Williams, Farm Worker, Llanerchymedd, Anglesey.
- Hiram Wilson, Blacksmith, Royal Naval Hospital, Haslar, Gosport (Catherington, Portsmouth).
- Isabella McKinnon Wilson, Sergeant, Ayr Burgh Police Force.
- Stanley Brown Wilson, Departmental Manager, Bridge of Weir Leather Company (Renfrewshire).
- John Wood, lately Carpenter, SS Baron Ailsa, Kelvin Shipping Company Ltd. (South Shields, Co. Durham).
- Ivan James Worsell, Member, Coast Life Saving Corps, Birling Gap (Eastbourne, Sussex).
- John Wright, Underground Road Repairer, Markham Colliery, National Coal Board, East Midlands Division (Chesterfield, Derby).
- Joseph Douglas Wynne MM, Radio Operator, Class I, Post Office Radio Station (Burnham-on-Sea, Somerset).

Foreign Services

- Edith Jean Marshall, Telephonist, HM Embassy, Buenos Aires.

Commonwealth of Australia

- Joseph Davis, lately Overseer of Works, Adelaide City Council, State of South Australia.
- James Phillips Culliford Peterson, lately Messenger, House of Assembly, State of South Australia.
- Hilda May Tapp. For services in connexion with Red Cross Society, State of South Australia.

Colonial Empire and former Mandated Territory of Palestine

- George Green, Senior Engine Driver, Water Boats, Harbour and Shipping Department, Barbados.
- Leonard King, Drainage Overseer, Block III Scheme, Corentyne, British Guiana.
- Hadjimichael Agapios, lately Head Steward, Government House, Cyprus.
- Tahir Merdjan, Mukhtar of Nicosia Town, Cyprus.
- Akosita Lolomea, Grade V Teacher, Fiji.
- Thomas Orlando Bolagu Fowlis, Second Grade Sanitary Inspector, Gambia.
- Paul Mboya, Executive Officer, Kisii Local Native Council, Kenya.
- Gerson d'Mello, 1st Grade Clerk, Kenya Clerical Service, Provincial Administration, Kenya.
- Francis Henry Arthur Koelmeyer, Technical Assistant, Grade I, Kuala Lumpur, Federation of Malaya.
- Che Masim Bin Hasan, Peon, Class I, Marine Department, Malacca, Federation of Malaya.
- Henry George Mardell, House Steward, Government House, Palestine.
- Milady Khalil Copty, Senior Graduate Nurse, Palestine.
- Ghattas Abdel Malik, Senior Storekeeper, Palestine Railways.
- Celia Schenker, Supervisor, Secretariat Typing Pool, Palestine.
- Mousa Ali Hammoudi, Clerical Officer, Grade II, Prisons Department, Palestine.
- Mark Atlas, Fruit Inspector, Palestine.
- Abdalla Yousef, Driver, Palestine Railways.
- Abdul Razzak Qassem, Mukhtar of Sinjil Village, Ramallah sub-district, Palestine.
- Collins Tehoquema Hazeley, Technical Staff, Grade III, Sierra Leone Railway.
- Justin Bullet Bin Kasid, Second Grade Clerk, District Office, Lushoto, Tanganyika.
- Nagar Bin Abdernabi, Third Chief Warder, Police and Prisons, Tanganyika.

=== Air Force Cross (AFC) ===
- Acting Wing Commander John Evelyn Grindon DSO.
- Squadron Leader Graeme Hunter Duncan.
- Squadron Leader Percy Oliver Valentine Green.
- Squadron Leader Michael Thomas Mary Hyland, Reserve of Air Force Officers.
- Squadron Leader Henry John Rayner DFC.
- Acting Squadron Leader Neville Frederick Duke DSO, DFC, Royal Air Force Volunteer Reserve.
- Acting Squadron Leader Joseph Herbert Spurgeon DFC.
- Flight Lieutenant Sidney Frederick Cooper, Royal Air Force Volunteer Reserve.
- Flight Lieutenant Norman Tom Evans.
- Flight Lieutenant Wilfred Thomas Haxby DFC.
- Flight Lieutenant William Desmond Hooper.
- Flight Lieutenant Paul Richard Mallorie.
- Flight Lieutenant Gartrell Richard Ian Parker DFC, DSM.
- Flight Lieutenant Philip Harry Tew.
- Flight Lieutenant Cecil Alan Tomlinson.
- Flight Lieutenant Donald Kingston Warburton.
- Flying Officer Clifford Bromley Lindop.
- Flying Officer George Herbert Tasney.
- Flying Officer Master Pilot William Douglas Bell.
- Master Signaller William John Ashcroft DFC.

=== Air Force Medal (AFM) ===
- Flight Sergeant Gordon Edgar Matthews, Royal Air Force Volunteer Reserve.
- Navigator Jonn Charles Reavill.
- Engineer II Stanley Wright.
- Gunner II Joseph Patrick L'Estrange, Royal Air Force.

=== King's Commendation for Valuable Service in the Air ===
Royal Air Force

- Acting Squadron Leader H. Coates DFC.
- Acting Squadron Leader P. W. Jamieson.
- Acting Squadron Leader A. G. Miles DFC.
- Flight Lieutenant R. H. Burgesse.
- Flight Lieutenant E. R. Gillespie, Royal Air Force Volunteer Reserve.
- Flight Lieutenant J. Lawson DFM.
- Flight Lieutenant R. W. Mathers DFC.
- Flight Lieutenant J. Parr DFM.
- Flight Lieutenant C. A. Sullings.
- Flying Officer J. Corrigan.
- Master Pilot A. E. Heath.
- Pilot II W. G. Monk.
- Navigator II V. Bowen, Royal Air Force Volunteer Reserve.
- Navigator II N. S. Rydings.
- Signaller II L. F. Rattenbury, Royal Air Force Volunteer Reserve.

=== King's Police and Fire Services Medal (KPFSM) ===
For Distinguished Service

England and Wales

- John Ormerod OBE, BEM, Chief Constable, Wallasey Borough Police Force.
- Colonel William Francis Henn MVO, Chief Constable, Gloucestershire Constabulary.
- Tom William Enfield, Chief Constable, Doncaster Borough Police Force.
- Robert Charles Hannaford OBE, District Commander, Metropolitan Police Force.
- John Harry Harker, Assistant Chief Constable, Lincolnshire Constabulary.
- John Philip William Kingston MBE, Chief Superintendent, Plymouth City Police Force.
- Benjamin Mervyn Beynon, Superintendent, Devonshire Constabulary.
- James Thomas Cockroft, Superintendent, West Riding Constabulary.
- Griffith William Roberts, Superintendent, Caernarvonshire Constabulary.
- Arthur Lawton Clarke, Superintendent, Stoke-on-Trent City Police Force.
- Oliver Arthur Ashment, Sub-Divisional Inspector, Metropolitan Police Force.

Scotland

- William Stewart, Chief Constable, Moray and Nairn Constabulary.
- David Baldie OBE, Chief Constable, Kirkcaldy Burgh Police Force.

Northern Ireland

- Albert Edward Smith, Head Constable, Royal Ulster Constabulary.

Fire Service

England and Wales

- Percy Pickersgill Booth OBE, former Chief Regional Fire Officer, No. 2 (Leeds) Region.
- Arthur Alfred Davis OBE, former Chief Regional Fire Officer, No 12 (Tunbridge Wells) Region.
- Frank Bitten MBE, former Assistant Chief of Fire Staff, National Fire Service Headquarters.
- Norman Amscough Swarbrick, former Divisional Officer, No. 10 (Manchester) Region.
- Daniel Durnford Ivall, former Assistant Fire Force Commander, No. 37 (London) Fire Force.

Scotland

- James Taylor Davidson OBE, Fire Force Commander, N.F.S., Central Area of Scotland.

Australia

- James Francis Sweeney, Superintendent 3rd Class, New South Wales Police Force.
- Wharton Craven Sydney Thompson, Superintendent 3rd Class, New South Wales Police Force.
- Robert Hamilton Blackley, Superintendent 3rd Class, New South Wales Police Force.
- Breffeny Richard Gorman, Inspector 1st Class, New South Wales Police Force.
- Francis Thomas Nunan, Inspector 1st Class, New South Wales Police Force.
- George William Arnold MVO, Superintendent 3rd Class, New South Wales Police Force.
- James Vincent Burgess, Inspector 2nd Class, New South Wales Police Force.

Ceylon

- Makalandage Albert de Silva, Superintendent of Police, Colombo Crimes.

Colonies and former Mandated Territory

- Stewart Lee Vincent CPM, Deputy Commissioner of Police, Kenya.
- Basil Morgan Benedict O'Connell, Assistant Commissioner of Police, Federation of Malaya.
- Leonard Faulconer Knight CPM, Assistant Commissioner of Police, Federation of Malaya.
- Patrick Joseph Meehan CPM, Superintendent of Police, Palestine.
- Geoffrey Harold Range BEM, Deputy Superintendent of Police, Palestine.
- Gordon Denis Toulson CPM, Deputy Superintendent of Police, Palestine.
- John Percival Bourne, Deputy Superintendent of Police, Palestine.

=== Colonial Police Medal (CPM) ===
For Meritorious Service

Southern Rhodesia

- Fungerai, African Station Sergeant, British South Africa Police.
- Ernest Murfin, Farrier Inspector, British South Africa Police.
- Louis Peach, Detective Inspector, British South Africa Police.

Swaziland Protectorate

- Johannes Musi, Sergeant Clerk and Interpreter, Swaziland Police.

Colonies, Protectorates, Tanganyika and the Former Mandated Territory of Palestine

- Alastair Robert Anderson, Assistant Superintendent, Singapore Police Force.
- Khaled Abdul Ghani El Arabi, Foot Constable, Palestine Police Force.
- Kenneth Arnold Bailey, First British Sergeant, Palestine Police Force.
- Henry George Beverley, Superintendent, Federation of Malaya Police Force.
- William Charles Black, British Inspector, Palestine Police Force.
- Halford Lovell Boudewyn, Inspector, Singapore Police Force.
- John George Hume Brett, Assistant Superintendent, Federation of Malaya Police Force.
- Robert Brooke, Head Constable, Palestine Police Force.
- Josiah Bunumbu, Court Messenger, Sergeant-Major, Sierra Leone Police Force.
- Fernand Andre Chasle, Sergeant-Major, Mauritius Police Force.
- Ernest Albert Cooke, British Inspector, Palestine Police Force.
- Arthur Cooper, Assistant Superintendent, Nigeria Police Force.
- Thomas Lewis Coppard, Assistant Superintendent, Palestine Police Force.
- William Donald Daw, First British Sergeant, Palestine Police Force.
- Selim George Deeb, Foot Sergeant, Palestine Police Force.
- Dewa Singh, Subedar, British North Borneo Armed Constabulary.
- Charles Thomas Winston Dobree, Superintendent, Federation of Malaya Police Force.
- James Hosie Joiner Dods, British Inspector, Palestine Police Force.
- Peter Anthony Doohan, First British Sergeant, Palestine Police Force.
- Archibald Henry Elston, Assistant Superintendent, Hong Kong. Police Force.
- Adeeb Ali Fares, Palestinian Inspector, Palestine Police Force.
- Derek Sendey Fountain, Senior Assistant Superintendent, Nigeria Police Force.
- John Neville Franklin, Superintendent, Gold Coast Police Force.
- Gindi Anak Banggan, Constable, Sarawak Constabulary.
- Hugh Gray, Assistant Superintendent, Singapore Police Force.
- Charles William John Greenstreet, Superintendent, Mauritius Police Force.
- Hamzah Bin Mahmud, Assistant Superintendent, Federation of Malaya Police Force.
- George Henry Walter Hickman, Second British Sergeant, Palestine Police Force.
- Mamode Sulliman Hossenbaccus, Sergeant-Major, Mauritius Police Force.
- James Hynds, Assistant Superintendent, Palestine Police Force.
- Salem Suleiman Abu Igbeli, Camelry Inspector, Palestine Police Force.
- Iu Muk, Sergeant-Major, Hong Kong Police Force.
- Wallace Moga Katuke, lately Senior Sergeant, Kenya Police Force.
- Raouf Husni Khadra, Palestinian Foot Sergeant, Palestine Police Force.
- Rassoonkhan Neeamuth Khan, Corporal, Mauritius Police Force.
- Paul Hengrave Kitson, Superintendent, Mauritius Police Force.
- Kichohi Korigo, 3rd Grade Sergeant, Kenya Police Force.
- Cyril James Lawson, Deputy Superintendent, Palestine Police Force.
- Arthur Bernard Lea, British Constable, Palestine Police Force.
- Momodu Alieu Lette, Sub-Inspector, Gambia Police Force.
- Loh Chong, Detective Sergeant, Federation of Malaya Police'Force.
- Peter Long, Second Class Inspector, Jamaica Constabulary.
- Cecil Alfred Mathias, Senior Superintendent, Uganda Police Force.
- Mordechai Medalia, Foot Sergeant, Palestine Police Force.
- Thomas Joseph Middleton, British Inspector, Palestine Police Force.
- Mkuzo, African Inspector, Northern Rhodesia Police Force.
- Russell Murray, Corporal, Trinidad Police Force.
- Fares Hussein Mustafa, Palestinian Sergeant, Palestine Police Force.
- Ahmed Yousef Abu Nar, Mounted Corporal, Palestine Police Force.
- George Olliver, Superintendent, Tanganyika Police Force.
- Titus Eleazar Peters, Inspector, Trinidad Police Force.
- Arthur James Poppy, Assistant Superintendent, Kenya Police Force.
- William Edwin Rumbelow, Assistant Commissioner, Sierra Leone Police Force.
- Mohammed Ali Salim, Foot Constable, Palestine Police Force.
- Charles Hugh Johnston Scott, Assistant Superintendent, Palestine Police Force.
- Mohamed Shah, lately Sub-Inspector, Singapore Police Force.
- Khalil Yousef Shuheiber, Acting Assistant Superintendent, Palestine Police Force.
- Alexander John Waterfield Slater, Assistant Superintendent, Federation of Malaya Police Force.
- Clive Alexander Smith, First Class Inspector, Jamaica Constabulary.
- Andiapen Sooben, Detective Sergeant, Mauritius Police Force.
- Tilbert St Louis, Sergeant, Trinidad Police Force.
- Dov Stotzki, Foo Corporal, Palestine Police Force.
- Harold Saul Swain, Senior Superintendent, Aden Police Force.
- George Milne Taylor, Assistant Superintendent, Kenya Police Force.
- Ivan Aaron Thompson, Sergeant, Barbados Police Force.
- John Randolph Ward, Assistant Superintendent, Kenya Police Force.
- Robert Joseph Webb, British Inspector, Palestine Police Force.
- Alfred Fitzjames Lyon Williams, British Inspector, Palestine Police Force.
- Kenneth Frederick Woodward, British Inspector, Palestine Police Force.
- Abdul Hamid Mohammed Younis, Mounted Sergeant, Palestine Police Force.
- Jacob Zlotnik, Palestinian Inspector, Palestine Police Force.

=== Mentions in Despatches ===
In recognition of services in Operational Minesweeping since the end of the war

- Leading Seaman (T.C.) John William Frederick Edwards.
- Chief Yeoman of Signals Ernest James Freestone.
- Mechanician 1st Class Samuel Huddlestone.
- Able Seaman Reginald Hirons.

== India ==
=== King's Police and Fire Services Medal (KPFSM) ===
For Distinguished Service

- B. B. S. Jetly, Indian Police, Deputy Inspector General of Police, Western Range, United Provinces.
- Gopi Krishna Handoo MBE, Indian Police, Senior Superintendent of Police, Agra, United Provinces.
- Babu Anil Kumar Misra, Inspector of Police, Cachar District, Assam.
- Mehta Dewan Chand, Superintendent of Police, Karnal, East Punjab.
- Rao Bahadur Jacob Devasahayam, Deputy Inspector-General of Police, Madras.
- Rao Sahib Venkataswamy Nayudu Ayyaswamy Nayudu, District Superintendent of Police (Officiating), Madras.
- Rao Sahib Baburao Sakharam Nalawade, District Superintendent of Police, Satara, Bombay.
- Ramchandra Rajaram Deshpande, Superintendent of Police (Officiating), Bombay City.
- Abul Fazl Abdul Hamld OBE, Indian Police, Inspector-General of Police, Bihar.
- Dibyendu Sundar Sinha, Senior Superintendent of Police (Officiating), Patna, Bihar.

== Ceylon ==
=== Knights Bachelor ===
- Richard Aluwihare CBE, Inspector General of Police. For services in connexion with the re-organisation of the Ceylon Police Force.

=== The Most Distinguished Order of Saint Michael and Saint George ===
==== Companion of the Order of St Michael and St George (CMG) ====
- Theodore Duncan Perera, Deputy Secretary to the Treasury and Secretary to the Cabinet.

=== The Most Excellent Order of the British Empire ===
==== Knight Commander of the Order of the British Empire (KBE) ====
===== Civil Division =====
- The Honourable Colonel John Lionel Kotelawala, Minister of Transport and Works.

==== Commander of the Order of the British Empire (CBE) ====
===== Civil Division =====
- Frank Arnold Gunasekera OBE, MRCS, LRCP, Senator, formerly Officer Commanding Ceylon Medical Corps.
- Stanley Graham Taylor, Director of Irrigation.
- Joseph Aloysius Donatus Victoria OBE, Senator. For voluntary social welfare services.

==== Officer of the Order of the British Empire (OBE) ====
===== Military Division =====
- Commander Gerald Royce Maxwell de Mel, Ceylon Royal Naval Volunteer Reserve.
- Brevet Colonel Randolph Jewell Francis Mendis, Staff Corps, Ceylon Defence Force.

===== Civil Division =====
- Kovindapillai Alvapillai, Food Commissioner and Director of Food Supplies.
- John Robert Blaze, Senior Physician, General Hospital, Colombo.
- Professor William Arthur Edward Karunaratne MD, Professor of Pathology, General Hospital, Colombo.
- Abdon Ignatius Perera, Acting Postmaster General.
- Abdul Raheman Abdul Razik, Senator, formerly Member of the State Council.
- Gunasena de Soyza, Commissioner of Co-operative Development.
- Sabapathy Somasundaram, Proctor of the Supreme Court.
- Bertram Edmund Weerasinghe, formerly Chief Officer, Colombo Municipal Fire Brigade, and Assistant Civil Defence Commissioner (Fire Services).

==== Member of the Order of the British Empire (MBE) ====
===== Military Division =====
- Captain Wilmot Selvanayagam Abraham, Staff Captain, Headquarters, Ceylon Garrison.
- Captain and Quartermaster Henry Edward Wittebron, Ceylon Garrison Artillery.

===== Civil Division =====
- Nandasara Wijetilaka Atukorala, Secretary to the Prime Minister.
- Homi Framjee Billimoria, Deputy Chief Architect, Public Works Department.
- Hylton Theodore Shirley d'Alwis, Architect, University Scheme, Peradeniya.
- Ralph St. Louis Pieris Deraniyagala, Clerk to the House of Representatives.
- James George Charles Stewart de Saram, Superintendent of Police, Central Province.
- Ratnasabapathy Doresamy, Member of Colombo Municipal Council, formerly Deputy Mayor of Colombo.
- Samuel Alexander Iddamalgoda Elapata, formerly Acting Assistant Government Agent (Emergency), Pelmadulla.
- Anian Walter Richard Joachim PhD, Acting Deputy Director of Agriculture.
- Erroll Alexander Koelmeyer, Superintendent of Police, Criminal Investigation Department.
- George Herbert Robins, Superintendent of Police, Colombo.

=== Imperial Service Order ===
- Arthur Lionel Basil Ferdinand, Assistant Government Agent, Matara.

=== British Empire Medal ===
Civil Division

- Marc South, Chief Inspector of Police, Ceylon.
