= Barker Road Methodist Church =

- Address: 48 Barker Road S309917
- Country: Singapore
- Website: https://www.brmc.org.sg/

History
- Former name: Barker Road Chapel
- Founded: 26 May 1957

Administration
- Division: Trinity Annual Conference (TRAC)

Clergy
- Pastors: Rev Dr Daniel Koh; Rev Lai Kai Ming; Rev Benjamin Fong; Rev Gilbert Lok; Ps Joshua Kwok; Mr Kevin Ngan

Barker Road Methodist Church (BRMC) is a Methodist church in Singapore located at 48 Barker Road along Dunearn Road, and is colocated with Anglo-Chinese School (Barker Road) and Anglo-Chinese School (Primary).

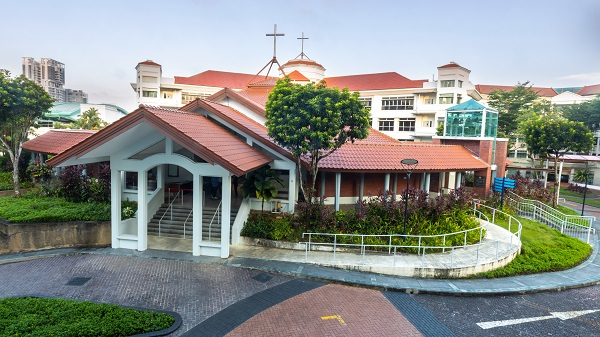
BRMC sanctuary

== History ==
BRMC was originally known as the Barker Road Chapel, and had its beginnings in 1956. It was later recognised as a Methodist church on 26 May 1957 with 12 registered members who were mainly Anglo-Chinese School boys.

BRMC is associated with the revival of Christian emphasis in the Anglo-Chinese School in the 1950s, and again in ACS Clock Tower Charismatic revival in 1972, when it hosted Anglo-Chinese School boys in the church sanctuary. Several participants in the revival later served as pastors in the church.

The church was one of the founding members of the National Council of Churches of Singapore.

In 2023, membership of the church stands at 3,150.

== Church buildings ==
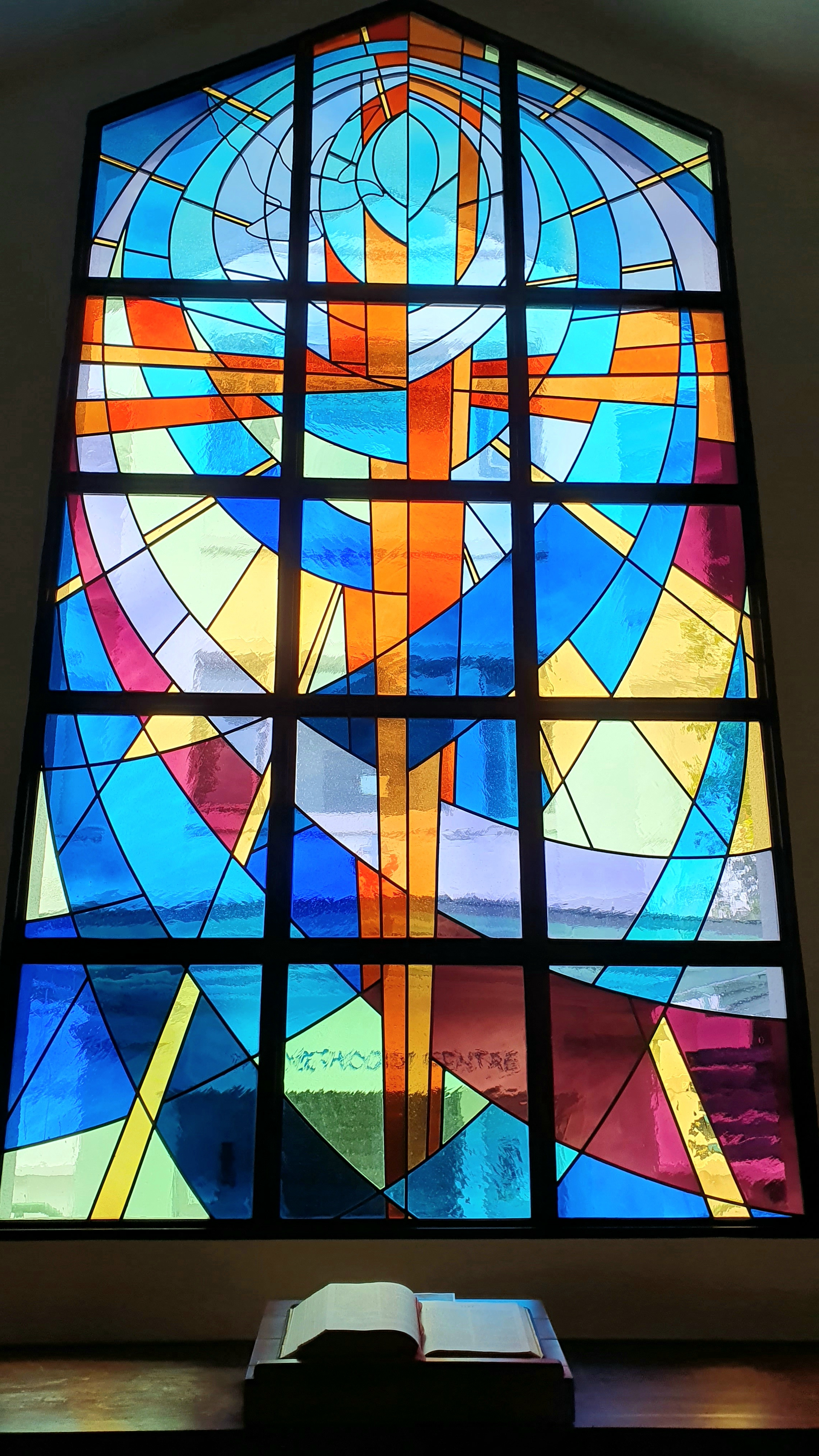
Stained Glass at BRMC sanctuary

The first purpose-built building was completed in 1963, and was dedicated by Bishop F. Lundy in 31 October 1965. It was demolished in 1987 and a new and much larger sanctuary was built. This was completed in 1991. It was then renovated in 1999 when the entire Barker Road campus comprising the school and Oldham Hall were redeveloped.

The newly renovated Sanctuary was completed in 2002, and form an integral part of the campus. The new sanctuary, although not architecturally significant, is large and seats a congregation of several hundred. It is a simple rectangular building surmounted a large tiled hipped roof. The interior is plain and utilitarian space, without any features of note, lit by plain fluorescent tubes. There is a small, simple stained-glass window at the liturgical east end, re-used from the earlier building. The church has a large four-manual digital organ by Allen Organs. There is a diminutive bell turret on the exterior, containing 5 bells, presented to the church by the 12th Singapore Company of the Boys' Brigade.

== Church planting ==
In October 1993, the church, together with Wesley Methodist Church launched a church-planting project at the Methodist Girls' School with the opening of a preaching point. It was later constituted as Covenant Community Methodist Church in September 1994.

A similar preaching point was established at Anglo-Chinese School (Independent) in 1998 in partnership with Wesley Methodist Church and Aldersgate Methodist Church, and was later constituted as Living Waters Methodist Church in April 2003.

In July 2007, BRMC opened a preaching point at Anglo-Chinese School (International). This preaching point was later constituted as Holland Village Methodist Church in 2012.

BRMC also runs Oasis BRMC Mission @Bukit Batok, which serves the local community by offering programmes for the disadvantaged and holds English and Mandarin worship services on Sundays.

== Affiliated organizations ==
BRMC also looks after the spiritual well-being of the following schools under the Anglo-Chinese School umbrella

- Anglo-Chinese School (Barker Road)
- Anglo-Chinese School (Primary)
- Anglo-Chinese School Oldham Hall
- The Boys' Brigade in Singapore 12th Company

It also hosts Barker Road Methodist Church Kindergarten, which was rebranded as BRMC Little Lights Preschool on 11 October 2021.

In 2001, the church jointly started what was to become MCYC Community Services Society with the Methodist Welfare Services (MWS). MCYC Community Services separated itself from MWS in June 2008 and became an independent charity organisation. It changed its name to Epworth Community Services on 21 June 2018.

The church also has Mandarin, Indonesian and Filipino congregations. The three services celebrated their 21st, 24th and 40th anniversaries in 2023 respectively.

== Notable events ==
The church organised and hosted several events that were relevant to the members of the public at large, and received coverage from the press. These include a forum on "Educational problems facing families in Singapore", a forum on "Family Life Problems" and a forum on "Approaches to Drug Problems".

The church also played host to the Boys' Brigade in Singapore during the Brigade's Thanksgiving Services.

The International Prayer Conference for Wesleyans in Renewal IIPCWR), was held at ACS Barker Road from 16–19 June 2004.

The 2018 edition of GoForth National Missions Conference was held on the ACS Barker Road campus and supported by the church.

On 22 July 2022, alumni, staff and students of ACJC, ACS (Barker) and ACS (Independent) organised “A Homecoming to God” to commemorate the 50th anniversary of the ACS Clocktower Revival.
