= Ong Teck Chin =

Singaporean educator (born 1949)

Dr. Ong Teck Chin
- Born: 24 November 1949 (age 76); Singapore
- Citizenship: Singaporean
- Education: National University of Singapore, University of Oxford
- Title: Principal of Anglo-Chinese School (Independent)
- Term: 1994–2010

Ong Teck Chin (simplified Chinese: 王德进; traditional Chinese: 王德進; Pe̍h-ōe-jī: Ông Tek-chìn; pinyin: Wáng Déjìn; born 1949) is a Singaporean educator. He was formerly the Principal of Anglo-Chinese School (Independent), and resident warden of its boarding school. He was the Principal of Singapore International School of Bangkok Sixth Form.

== Education ==
Ong is an alumnus of Raffles Institution and graduated from the National University of Singapore in 1972 with a Bachelor of Science (with honours) in chemistry. He went on to earn his Doctor of Philosophy in clinical biochemistry at the University of Oxford in 1975 under a Rhodes Scholarship.

== Career ==
Ong became a physiology lecturer at the Faculty of Medicine of the National University of Singapore (NUS) from 1975 till 1991. While lecturing in the NUS, he concurrently held the position of Vice-Principal in ACS(I) from 1988 until 1994, when he was appointed Principal.

Ong has published papers in international journals on exercise physiology, sports ergonomics and fitness assessments as well as research papers on education. During his reservist days in the Singapore Armed Forces, he received a Merit Award for his essay Discipline and Control in the Military, submitted for the 1989 Chief of General Staff Annual Essay Competition.

In addition, Ong was the chairman of the Broadcast, Publications & Arts Appeal Advisory Committee (BPAAC), one of the committees that advised the Government of Singapore on censorship issues. He was also an executive committee member of the now-defunct Singapore Centre for Teaching Thinking, established in 1998 at the National Institute of Education, as part of the Thinking Schools Learning Nation initiative launched by Senior Minister Goh Chok Tong in 1997. Ong is recognised as a Solemniser of Marriages by the Registry of Marriages, Singapore.

Ong was appointed Principal of Anglo-Chinese School (Independent) in 1994 when his predecessor, Lawrence Chia, stepped down after six years. Ong's appointment was initially controversial, as he was a former student of Raffles Institution, a rival school.

During his tenure as principal, ACS(I) gained the Singapore Quality Award and the Singapore Quality Class in recognition of administrative and educational excellence. Singapore Quality Class (SQC) is the certification for the overall business excellence standard, and the Singapore Quality Award (SQA) is conferred on organisations that demonstrate the highest standards of business excellence. The school received many other awards, such as the School Excellence Award (an award for academic excellence), the School Distinction Award, the Best Practice Awards and many awards at the Odyssey of the Mind (OM) World Finals. Ong also serves as the Odyssey of the Mind Singapore Tournament Director.

Ong was initially the Vice-Principal for pastoral care in the school. This is currently a core component of the school's curriculum. Ong introduced the practice of naming classes after biblical heroes, books or cities in 1997, as well as the practice of dedicating each academic year to an inspirational theme from the Bible.

The International Baccalaureate Diploma Programme was introduced during his tenure. The school was the first in the Singapore education system to implement the programme. This was a significant step in the reform of Singaporean education system, which had been cited by critics as being too harsh and rigid in its regimen, not to mention its examination-centric approach towards achieving academic excellence.

Ong maintained the school's reputation for strict discipline. He has said:

"We have corporal punishment for serious offences. If parents disagree, then they should not have put their child in this school".

The Anglo-Chinese School (Independent) publicity material for the International Baccalaureate Diploma Programme additionally emphasises that IB students guilty of serious violations of academic dishonesty, if male, may be caned.

In 31 July 2016, Ong was appointed principal of Singapore International School Of Bangkok (SISB) Sixth Form. Ong resigned as principal of SISB in mid-2024 after serving for eight years.

=== Incident ===
On 4 October 2010, Ong announced his resignation as Principal of Anglo-Chinese School.

It was implied that he stepped down for health reasons. However, his resignation came shortly after allegations of inappropriate behaviour towards a male teacher had been made about him to the ACS Board of Governors. An inquiry committee was formed, comprising members from both the Anglo-Chinese School Board of Governors and the Anglo-Chinese School (Independent) Board of Management.

Tan made statements to The New Paper stating that he filed the complaint because he "wanted justice to be served" and that there were "possibly a few people" involved in this matter. According to a report in The Straits Times, "Mr Tan told The Straits Times that he had e-mail, text messages and recordings to prove his claims of Dr Ong's inappropriate behaviour."

The panel convened found that these allegations were reinforced by their findings: "Dr. Ong Teck Chin has conducted himself in an inappropriate manner and that his conduct has fallen short of the standards expected of a principal". The Board did not state the nature of the allegations.

In a press statement on 22 November 2010, the ACS Board of Governors and the ACS(I) Board of Management said that Ong deeply regretted his actions and had apologised. His last official day of work at ACS was 30 November 2010.

== Accolades ==
- The Outstanding Young Person of Singapore (Silver) Jaycees International Award in 1975
- The National Day Commendation Medal (Military) in 1994 in recognition of his contributions to the Singapore Armed Forces (SAF)
- The National Institute of Education Dr Ruth Wong Gold Medal for the Diploma in Education Administration(Secondary)
- The Public Administration Medal (Silver), awarded during National Day 1997

== Personal life ==
In April 2008, Ong underwent major open heart surgery to correct coronary disease.
