= Anglo-Chinese Junior College =

- 英华初级学院; Maktab Rendah Anglo-Chinese

Location
- 25 Dover Close East, Dover; Queenstown, 139745; Singapore; 1.3036°N 103.7864°E

Information
- Type: Junior college
- Motto: The Best Is Yet To Be
- Religious affiliation: Christianity
- Denomination: Methodist
- Established: 1977
- Founder: William F. Oldham
- Superintendent: Rathi Parimalan
- Session: Single-session
- School code: 0803
- Chairman: Richard Seow (ACS Board of Governors)
- Principal: Valarie Wilson
- Gender: Mixed
- Colours: Red; Blue; Gold
- Song: ACS Forever
- Affiliation: Anglo-Chinese Schools; Fairfield Methodist School (Secondary); Geylang Methodist School (Secondary); Methodist Girls' School; Paya Lebar Methodist Girls' School (Secondary)
- Website: https://acjc.moe.edu.sg/

Anglo-Chinese Junior College (ACJC) is a junior college in Dover, Queenstown, Singapore. It was established in 1977 and is part of the Anglo-Chinese School. It offers a two-year pre-university programme leading to the Singapore-Cambridge GCE Advanced Level examination.

== History ==
The history of the school dates back to 1913 when the Anglo-Chinese College building project and the fund-raising initiative were started by Reverend J S Nagle. He started negotiations with the British colonial government about setting up a college to prepare students for British university education. The proposal was turned down by the government, who decided in favour of establishing Raffles College to commemorate the centenary of the founding of Singapore.

In 1970 the ACS Board of Governors submitted their recommendations for a junior college to the Singapore government. A 6-hectare site at Rochester Park on a 30-year lease was given for the construction of the college. Thus, on 3 January 1977, Anglo-Chinese Junior College became the fifth junior college to be established in line with the Ministry of Education's policy on pre-university education, equivalent to a British Sixth-form college, and welcoming 968 students in Pre-U 1 and Pre-U 2. To start with, it was an all-male institution. Its main complex was equipped with three lecture theatres, a library, the Tan Chin Tuan Auditorium and eight laboratories. The Shaw Sports Complex housed a 400-metre bitumen track, tennis, volleyball, basketball and sepak takraw courts.

In 1986, an expansion of the college was proposed and approved by the Ministry of Education three years later. The extension included a new four-storey Library Block to contain the Oldham Library on two levels, two lecture theatres and two micro-computer laboratories. A multi-purpose void deck was built under the extension for events to be held in the college. A new 8-lane 400m track and soccer field with floodlighting capacity was also included. This phase was completed in 1991 and cost $3.5 million.

On 1 March 1992, the college's Founder's Day, the ACJC Sports Complex started construction. The complex contains two swimming pools, a gymnasium, badminton courts and billiard facilities. A multi-purpose hall was also built in the complex, together with a lounge, dance studios, and a Heritage Room where trophies and memorabilia are showcased. The Complex also houses a cafe on the pool deck. $500,000 for the complex were raised through the college's biannual carnival, Fun-O-Rama, and other carnivals.

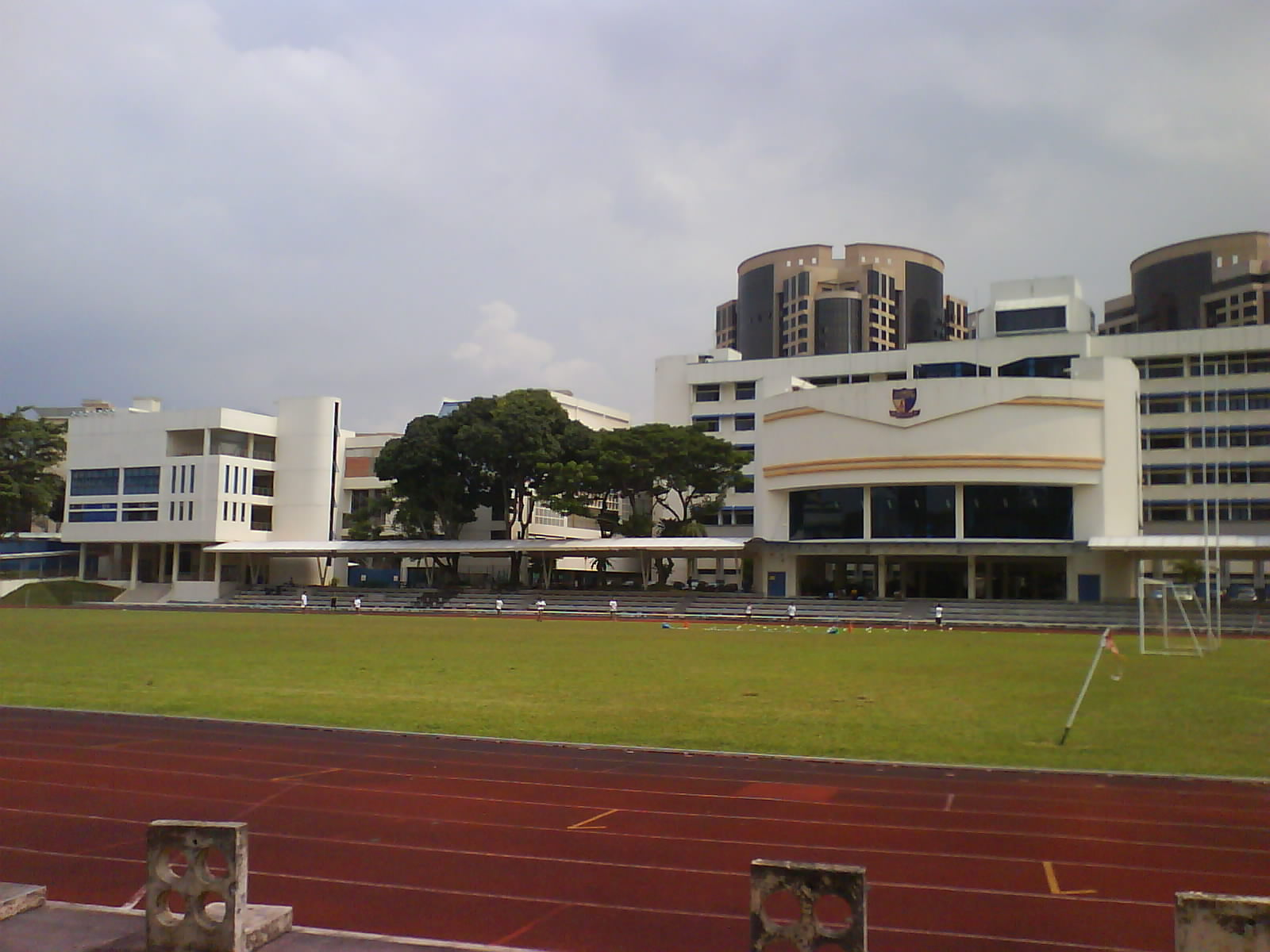
(From left to right) Oldham Wing, Library Block and Viewing Gallery. The main 7-storey building is in the background, behind the Gallery.

In line with MOE's requirements, such as IT-enabled facilities, a major renovation was planned for the college. In 1999, the College Upgrading Project was started at a total cost of $21 million. The main block was refurbished and a 600-seat lecture theatre and viewing gallery built, with a concourse linking it to the lobby of the building. An Oldham Wing and covered walkways to all parts of the campus were built. The renovations was completed by December 2002.

The Anglo-Chinese Junior College Center for Performing Arts is the main venue for performing arts programmes at ACJC. Commissioned in May 2008, it hosts a fully equipped theatre, a black box, a dance studio and other places for the performing arts. The CPA is home to many of the College's musical and theatrical productions, and the facilities are also available for use by the community.

== Co-curricular activities ==
Clubs and Societies	Performing Arts	Services	Sports
Christian Fellowship; Debate and Oratorical Society; Interact Club; Pixel Labs (Digital Media & Film Society); STEM Council (Science, Technology, Engineering and Mathematics); AC Uniformed Groups	ACSian Theatre; Choir; Concert band; Dance Society; Guitar Ensemble; String Ensemble	First Aid; Media Resource Crew; Photographic Society; Students’ Council	Badminton; Basketball; Bowling; Canoeing; Cross country; Floorball; Football; Hockey; Netball; Rugby; Softball; Squash; Swimming; Table tennis; Tennis; Track and Field; Volleyball; Waterpolo

== Academic Information ==
=== Academic Profile ===
Students must adhere to the MOE prescribed standard of at least three H2 and one H1 subject (of which at least one must be a contrasting subject), General Paper, Project Work, and Mother Tongue Language.

Subject	H1 Level	H2 Level	H3 Level
Art	◆	◆	◆
Biology	◆	◆	◆
Chemistry	◆	◆	◆
China Studies in English		◆	
Computing		◆	
Economics	◆	◆	◆
English Language and Linguistics		◆	
Further Mathematics		◆	
Geography	◆	◆	◆
General Paper (8881)	◆		
History	◆	◆	◆
Literature in English	◆		◆
Mathematics	◆	◆	◆
Mother Tongue Languages and Literature	◆		
Music		◆	◆
Physics	◆	◆	◆
Project Work	◆		
Theatre Studies		◆	

Knowledge and Inquiry has no longer been offered since 2022.

== Achievements ==
=== Performing arts ===
==== Choir ====
The ACJC Choir is the four-time winner of the Singapore Youth Festival Choir of the Year award (1989, 1993, 1995, 1997) and double holder of the Best Junior College Choir title (2001, 2003). In 2005 the choir was awarded the Gold with Honours award in the Singapore Youth Festival. The Choir also achieved the Gold award at the 2007 SYF Central Judging and the Gold with Honours awards at the 2009 and 2011 SYF Judging.

The Choir participates in overseas competitions and tours. Its first tour was to Japan in 1989. Since then it has toured South Korea (1990) and the United States (1993), where it performed at the headquarters of the United Nations and Carnegie Hall. The Choir was invited by the International Federation for Choral Music to perform at the 4th World Symposium on Choral Music in Sydney, Australia in 1996.

Since 1997 the Choir has won international competitions in Sweden, Finland, the Netherlands, the Czech Republic, and Slovakia. In 2006 the ACJC Choir competed at the Llangollen International Eisteddfod in Wales and came second in the Youth Category and first in the Mixed Category.

In June 2008 the ACJC Choir emerged as the only choir with three Gold medals at the 3rd Festa Choralis International Choir Competition in Bratislava, Slovakia. The only Asian choir at the competition, it competed alongside choirs from Poland, Great Britain, the Czech Republic, Russia and Slovakia in the Mixed Choir (Adult), Youth Choir (up to 19 years old) and Folk Song Categories. In all three categories, the ACJC Choir won gold medals with top marks and was the only choir in the competition to whom the adjudicators awarded a perfect score of 100 points.

The Choir organises the annual concert An Evening With Friends, and performs regularly at community and ministerial events.

=== Sports ===
ACJC has won many championships in bowling, rugby, softball, swimming, water polo, badminton, golf, billiards, netball, air rifle, football, squash, tennis and track and field.

The ACJC cross-country team was successful in the national schools' championships for 2001, 2002 and 2003 for the boys' team. The girls' team won the championship in 1999 and has consistently emerged among the top 3 teams since. In 2002 and 2003, the boys' team won individual champions. Its latest win in the national inter-school cross-country championships was in 2007.

In rugby, ACJC has held the 'A' Division title since 2000 but lost it to longtime rival Raffles Junior College in 2004. In 2005 the title was finally regained by ACJC. Waterpolo has also resulted in numerous wins for the college.

In bowling, ACJC has also won many championships in the girls category, having retained the 'A' division title since 2018, with a historic clean sweep of all the medals in 2021. The boys team has also constantly emerged top 3 since their last win in 2015, finishing 2nd in the 2022 National School Games.

== See also ==
- Anglo-Chinese School
- Anglo-Chinese School (Barker Road)
- Anglo-Chinese School (Independent)
