= Li Denghui =

Li Denghui may refer to:

- Lee Teng-hui (1923–2020), fourth president of the Republic of China (Taiwan) (1988-2000)
- Li Denghui (educator) (1873–1947), president of Fudan University, Shanghai
