= Anglo-Chinese School (Barker Road) =

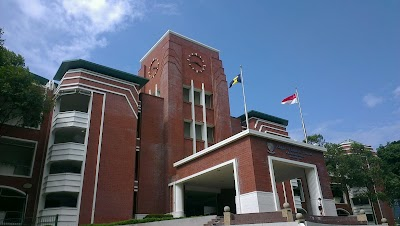

Location
- 60 Barker Road, Singapore; 309919; 1°19′10.9″N 103°50′8.7″E

Information
- Type: Government-aided
- Motto: The Best Is Yet To Be
- Religious affiliation: Christianity
- Denomination: Methodist
- Established: 1 March 1886; 140 years ago
- Founder: William Fitzjames Oldham
- Sister school: Methodist Girls' School, Singapore
- Superintendent: Toh Chye Seng
- School code: 7032
- Chairman: Richard Seow (ACS Board of Governors)
- Principal: Tse Horng Khoo
- Chaplain: Malcolm Tan
- Gender: Boys
- Enrolment: 1450
- Colour: Red Blue Gold
- Song: ACS Anthem
- Affiliations: Anglo-Chinese Junior College
- Website: www.acsbr.moe.edu.sg

Anglo-Chinese School (Barker Road) is a Methodist all-boys' secondary government-funded school situated at Barker Road in Newton, Singapore. It is a member of the Anglo-Chinese family of schools in Singapore. It offers the Singapore-Cambridge GCE Ordinary Level Certificate and SBB full subject-based banding G1, G2, and G3 courses for its students from Sec 1 to Sec 4/5. Students may then move on to Anglo-Chinese Junior College or Anglo-Chinese School (Independent) if wanting to continue this ACS tradition. ACS was also the first school in Singapore to have a flower named after it, the Ascocenda Anglo-Chinese School orchid, a hybrid created by the school to mark its 116th Founder's Day on 1 March 2002. ACS has many partner schools, such as the Anglo-Chinese School (Junior) and Anglo-Chinese Junior College.

It was a full school which subsumed Anglo-Chinese School (Primary) as its primary school section until 1998, when the school split into two. The school has been based at the newly rebuilt Barker Road campus since 2003.

== Barker Road campus ==
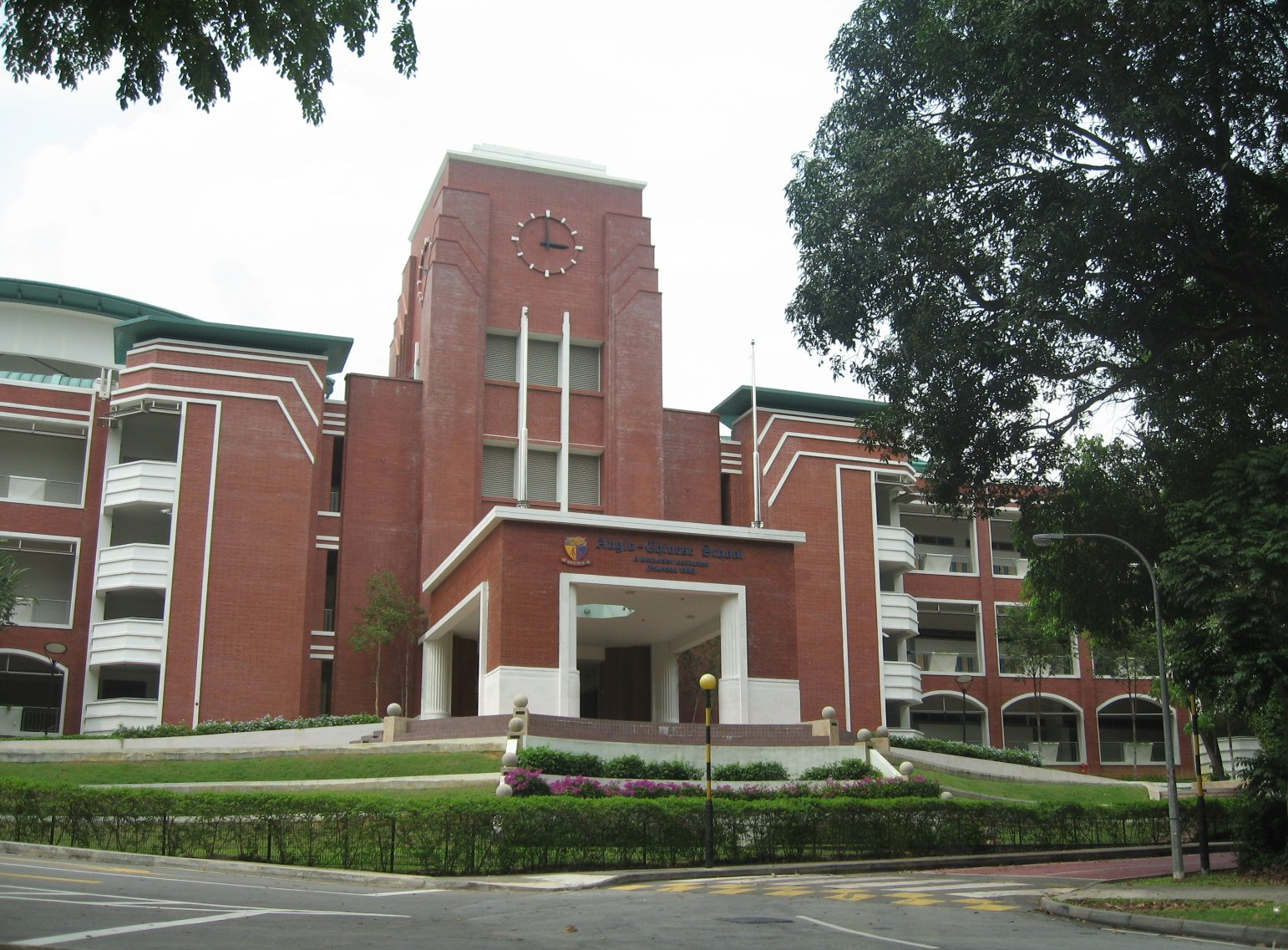
Anglo-Chinese School (Barker Road) with its distinctive clock tower. The Barker Road Campus also houses Anglo-Chinese School (Primary).

In 1999, ACS (Barker Road) moved out of the campus after a closing ceremony on 4 November, to allow the campus to be redeveloped. A replica now stands 20 metres from the old clock tower, with the original clock mechanism installed in the new tower.

The 5.7-hectare campus now contains the primary and secondary blocks of ACS (Primary) and ACS (Barker Road), respectively. In between the primary and secondary buildings is an administrative block housing the administrative office as well as the two libraries. The landscaped, open-air Student Plaza links the three buildings together. The cafeteria, bookstore, CCA rooms and Music Studios are one floor below the Plaza. The Arts Centre contains the Mrs Lee Choon Guan Concert Hall, Tan Cheng Siong Drama Theatre and the Lee Kong Chian Auditorium, which can seat 830, 270 and 1,200 respectively.

The sports complex also sits on the campus, containing the Shaw Pool and the Tan Chin Tuan Sports Hall. The Sports Hall has three basketball courts, a racket centre, full recreational facilities, including a gym and changing rooms. The Olympic-size pool has eight lanes. The Transport Centre/carpark is below the complex.

Barker Road Methodist Church and the Methodist Centre (housing the Methodist Church in Singapore) have also been relocated to the redeveloped Barker Road campus. ACS Oldham Hall has also been renovated with improved facilities, such as air-conditioning in some rooms, a cafeteria, and the capacity to house 500 boarders. The Barker Road campus was designed by SAA Architects Pte and the entire project cost was S$95 million, of which S$15 million had to be raised by the school. In 2004, the campus won the CIDB Award for Construction Excellence.

Construction of the Indoor Sports Hall Complex was completed in January 2022, and features 2 full sized basketball courts, and a futsal court. The block also features multiple fully air conditioned classrooms, and a university styled lecture theatre.

== Notable alumni ==
- Tharman Shanmugaratnam, 9th President of Singapore
- Dr Ng Eng Hen, Former Minister of Defence, Singapore
- Winston Choo, Lieutenant-General of the Singapore Armed Forces
- Lim Kim San, Former Cabinet Minister, Chairman of the Housing and Development Board and Chairman of the Port of Singapore Authority
- Goh Keng Swee, Former Member of Parliament, Former Deputy Prime Minister
- Ng Eng Hen, Former Member of Parliament, Former Minister of Defence
- Tan Chin Tuan, Former Chairman of OCBC Bank
- Nathan Hartono, Singer-Songwriter

== See also ==
- Anglo-Chinese School
- Anglo-Chinese School (Junior)
- Anglo-Chinese School (Independent)
- Anglo-Chinese Junior College
