= McCallum Street =

Street in Chinatown, Singapore

Coordinates: 1.2790°N 103.8462°E

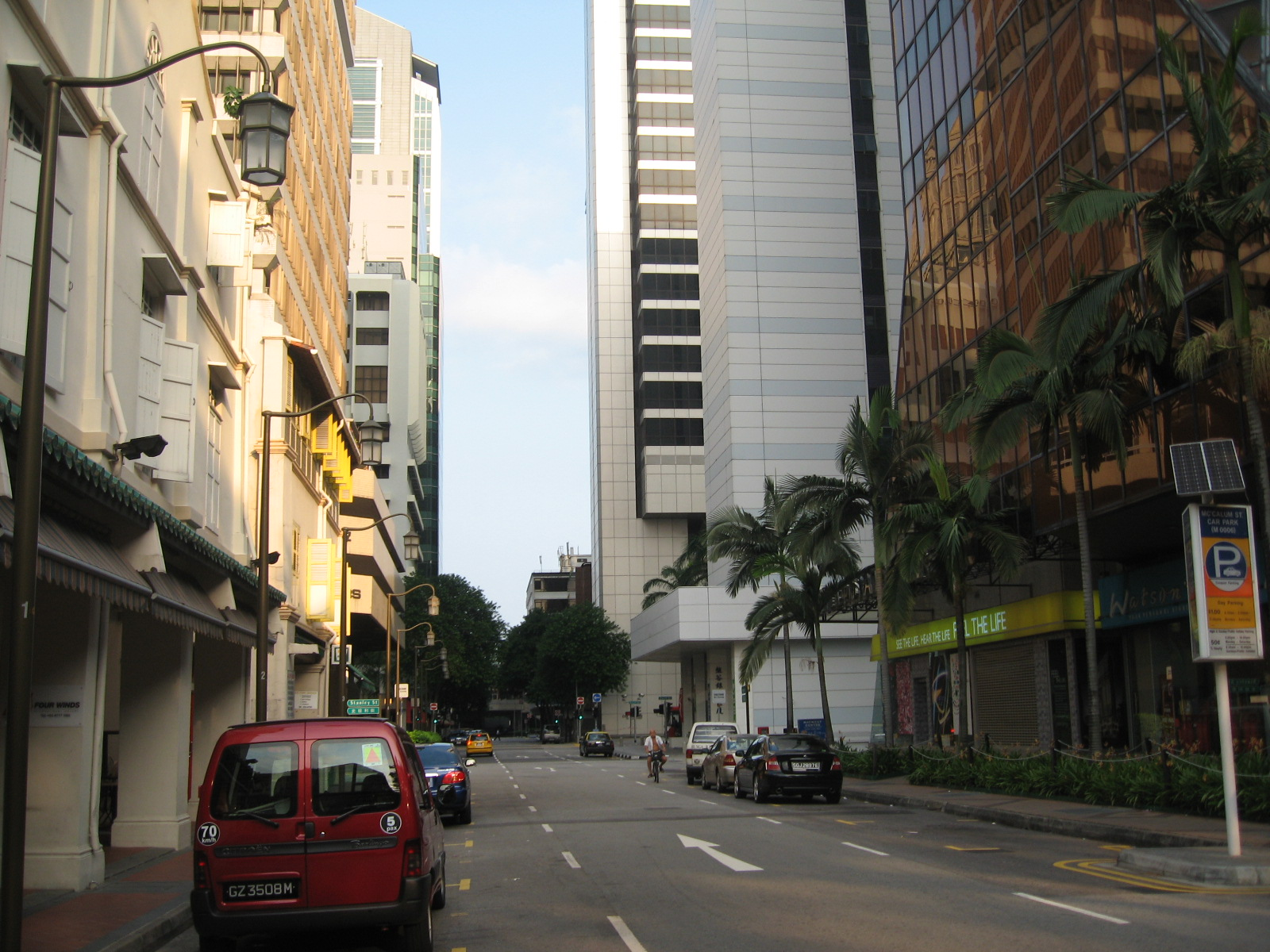
McCallum Street in Chinatown, Singapore

McCallum Street (Chinese: 麦卡南街) is a one-way street located in Chinatown, Singapore, and the financial district of Shenton Way in the planning areas of both Outram and Downtown Core, respectively. The street starts from Shenton Way and ends at the junction of Telok Ayer Street which then continues to Amoy Street. The Chinatown part of the street links the junction of Telok Ayer Street and Amoy Street towards Cecil Street, and for the Shenton Way part linking from Shenton Way to Cecil Street.

== Etymology ==
Before the official naming of the street, the street was called tit lok a-ek bue-tiau koi in Hokkien, meaning the "last street in Telok Ayer" as it was unnamed.

In 1895, after the town area of Singapore is levelled and drained and the area divided into various, various public streets were declared in the new area, including McCallum Street. The street is named after Major Henry McCallum, who was a colonial engineer in Singapore in the 1890s.
