= Henry McCallum =

British colonial governor (1852–1919)

Sir Henry Edward McCallum GCMG
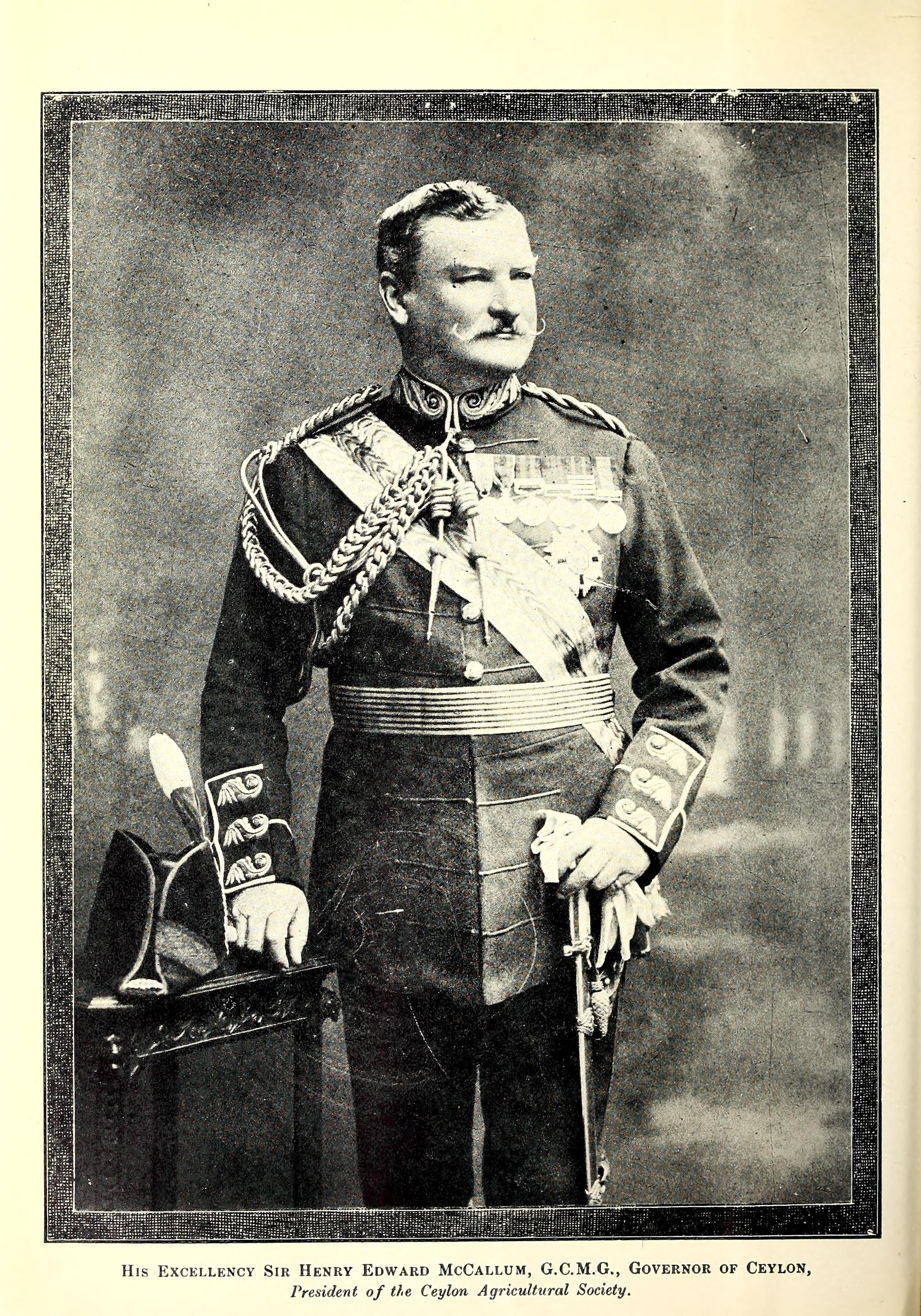

20th Governor of British Ceylon
- In office 24 August 1907 – 24 January 1913
- Monarchs: Edward VII; George V
- Preceded by: Hugh Clifford (Acting governor)
- Succeeded by: Reginald Edward Stubbs (Acting governor)

Personal details
- Born: 28 October 1852 Yeovil, Somersetshire, England
- Died: 24 November 1919 (aged 67) England

Viceregal styles of Sir Henry Edward McCallum
- Reference style: His Excellency
- Spoken style: Your Excellency

Sir Henry Edward McCallum, GCMG (28 October 1852 – 24 November 1919) was a British colonial governor.

== Biography ==
McCallum attended the Royal Military College in Woolwich and began his colonial service career in 1874.

He was Colonial Engineer for the Straits Settlements based in Singapore and played a key role in introducing electricity to Singapore in 1892. However he was involved in a public spat with James MacRitchie the Municipal Engineer who recommended against the introduction of electricity.

He was governor of Lagos Colony from 1897 to 1899 before coming to Newfoundland in 1899. The friction between McCallum and Prime Minister Robert Bond resulted in his recall in early 1901.

McCallum then became governor of Natal in February 1901, arriving in his new province in May to take up residence in Pietermaritzburg. His tenure in Natal included the last year of the Second Boer War, with guerrilla fighting in neighbouring Transvaal and Orange River Colony. On the conclusion of this war in June 1902, parts of Transvaal was transferred to Natal, increasing the colony by about one-fourth. The period following the war was succeeded by commercial depression, though in Natal it was not so severely felt as in other states of South Africa. The government of Natal met the crisis by renewed energy in harbour works, railway constructions and the development of the natural resources of the country. Politics in the colony was unsettled, however, and his tenure saw several changes of government. McCallum was the host when in December 1902 the British Colonial Secretary Joseph Chamberlain visited the colony.

McCallum′s last appointment came as governor of Ceylon in 1907. He retired from colonial service in 1913 and returned to England.

The isolated outport of McCallum on the southern coast of the island of Newfoundland is named for Henry McCallum.

== Legacy ==
In Singapore, McCallum Street is named after him in 1895 for his contributions as the Colonial Engineer.

In Penang, Malaysia, there is another McCallum Street named after him.

== See also ==
- Governors of Newfoundland
- List of governors of Natal
- List of communities in Newfoundland and Labrador
- List of people of Newfoundland and Labrador

Political offices
Preceded by Sir Gilbert Thomas Carter	Governor of Lagos; 1897–1899	Succeeded by William MacGregor
Preceded by Sir Herbert Harley Murray	Colonial Governor of Newfoundland; 1899–1901	Succeeded by Sir Cavendish Boyle
Preceded by Hon Sir Walter Hely-Hutchinson	Governor of Natal; 1901–1907	Succeeded by Matthew Nathan
Preceded by Hugh Clifford acting governor	Governor of Ceylon; 1907–1913	Succeeded by Reginald Edward Stubbs acting governor
