= SISB =

SISB Pcl
- Bangkok; Thailand

Information
- Type: International School; Boarding School
- Established: 2001
- Founder: Mr Kelvin Koh Yew Hock
- Gender: Male
- Key products: Education Services
- Website: http://www.sisb.ac.th

SISB Public Company Limited is an operator of international schools in Thailand. The only school listed on the Stock Exchange of Thailand, its schools teach the Singaporean curriculum.

As of 2023, SISB has six campuses in Thailand for children between the ages of 2 and 18, with more than 4,000 students from over 30 countries.

== History ==
SISB founded its first school, the Singapore International School of Bangkok (Ekkamai campus) in 2001 in Bangkok, Thailand. It was the first Singapore International School established in Thailand. In 2012, SISB established its second school (SISB Pracha Uthit campus) which is currently the group's flagship campus. SISB schools offer education from nursery, kindergarten, primary to secondary (Year 8 to 13 which includes sixth form) levels.

Headquartered in Bangkok, Thailand, SISB Public Company Limited currently employs over 500 employees.

== Curriculum ==
SISB schools adopt the Singapore and UK curriculum. All SISB schools use English as the main medium for teaching and provide a trilingual curriculum in English, Chinese and Thai languages.

== Accreditations ==
In 2016, SISB Pracha Uthit was appointed by the Singapore Examinations and Assessment Board (SEAB) as the official examination centre for the Singapore International Primary School Examination (iPSLE). SISB Pracha Uthit is an approved centre certified by Cambridge International Examinations (CIE) to conduct the IGCSE, AS and A Levels examinations. SISB Pracha Uthit is a certified SAT and Hanban (Chinese proficiency) test centre. It is fully accredited by the Council of International Schools (CIS) and the New England Association of Schools & Colleges (NEASC).

== Schools ==
SISB operates five schools and one joint-venture school in Thailand:

- Singapore International School of Bangkok (SISB Pracha Uthit)
- Singapore International School Chiangmai (SISB Chiangmai) (joint-venture)
- Singapore International School Nonthaburi (SISB Nonthaburi)
- Singapore International School Suvarnabhumi (SISB Suvarnabhumi)
- Singapore International School Thonburi (SISB Thonburi)
- Singapore International School Rayong (SISB Rayong)

SISB also formerly operated one school that has now shut down.

- Singapore International School Ekkamai (SISB Ekkamai)

== School Facilities ==
Facilities at SISB Schools include equipped with general classrooms, a swimming pool, library, science and computer laboratories, multi-purpose hall and playgrounds. SISB Pracha Uthit campus provides full-time and boarding options.
