= Anglo-Chinese School (Independent) =

Independent school in Singapore

Location
- 121 Dover Road; Singapore 139650; 1.302570°N 103.780586°E

Information
- Type: Autonomous
- Motto: To God Be The Glory, The Best Is Yet To Be
- Denomination: Methodist
- Established: 1 March 1886; 140 years ago
- Founder: William Fitzjames Oldham
- Sister school: Methodist Girls' School
- Superintendent: Stella Wee Bee Lian
- School code: 7001
- Chairperson: Choe Peng Sum (ACS Board of Governors)
- Principal: Kevin Pang
- Chaplain: Reverend Khoo Kay Huat
- Staff: 500
- Gender: Boys (Year 1–4); Mixed (Year 5–6)
- Age range: 12–18
- Enrolment: 2900
- Colour: Red Blue Gold
- Song: ACS Anthem
- Team name: Team ACS
- Website: acsindep.moe.edu.sg

Anglo-Chinese School (Independent) (ACS(I)) is an independent Methodist secondary school in Dover, Singapore. Founded in 1886 by Reverend William Fitzjames Oldham, it was recognised as an International Baccalaureate World School in 2005, and has since consistently ranked among the top three schools worldwide that offer the IB Diploma Programme.

Keeping in line with its history as a boys' school, ACS(I) provides secondary education for only boys from years 1 to 4. Since 2012, ACS(I) and its affiliated school Methodist Girls' School (MGS) have partnered for an Integrated Programme, which allows ACS(I) and MGS students to skip the Singapore-Cambridge GCE Ordinary Level examinations and proceed directly to years 5 and 6 at ACS(I) to complete the IB Diploma Programme.

== History ==
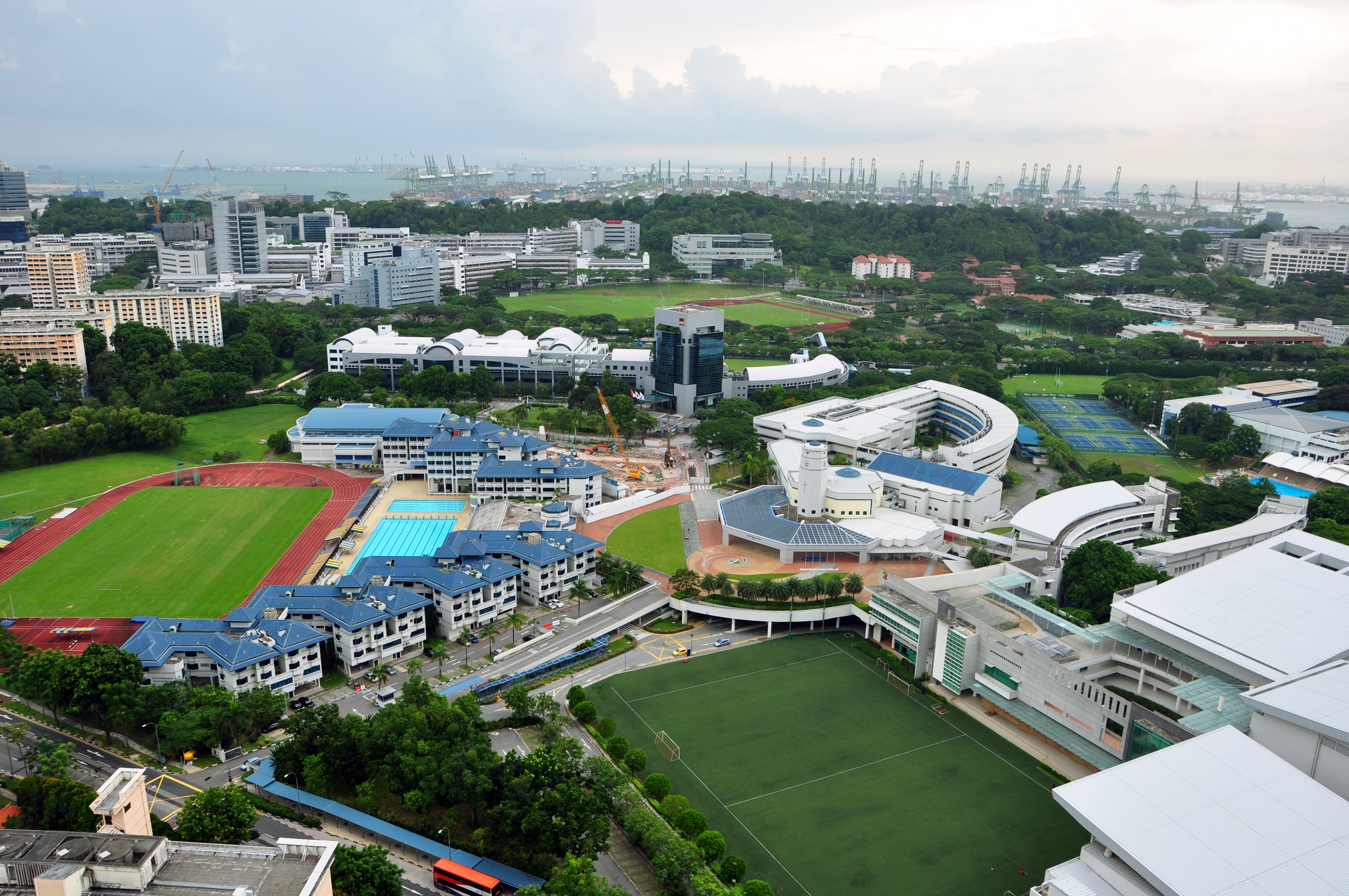
Aerial view of the school, before the construction of the new apartment-styled boarding block: (from left to right) sports complex, boarding school, original main building, IB block

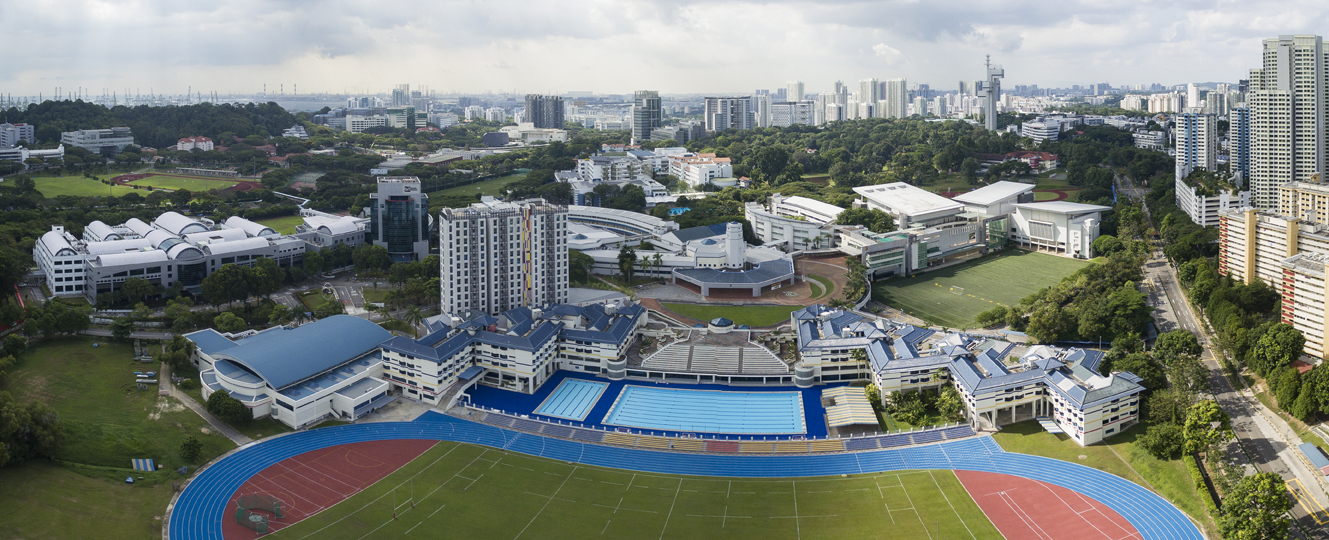
Aerial Panorama of Anglo Chinese School Independent in Dover Road, Singapore. Shot 2016.

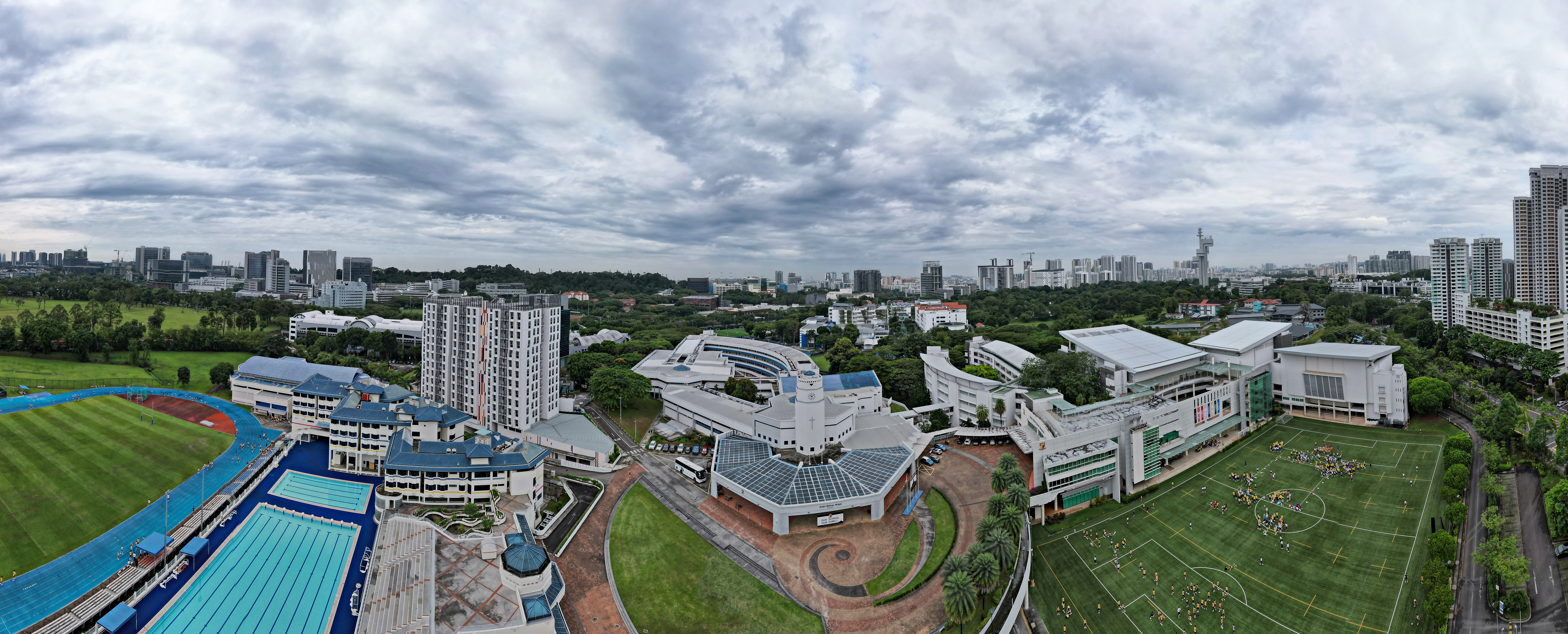
ACS (Independent) Aerial Panorama. Shot in Feb 2023.

ACS was offered 'independent' status by the Ministry of Education in 1987. This was accepted by the ACS Board of Governors. In 1992, the school moved from Barker Road to a new campus at Dover Road. The site was opened by Finance Minister Richard Hu on 1 March 1993, the 107th anniversary of the school's founding by Bishop William Fitzjames Oldham.

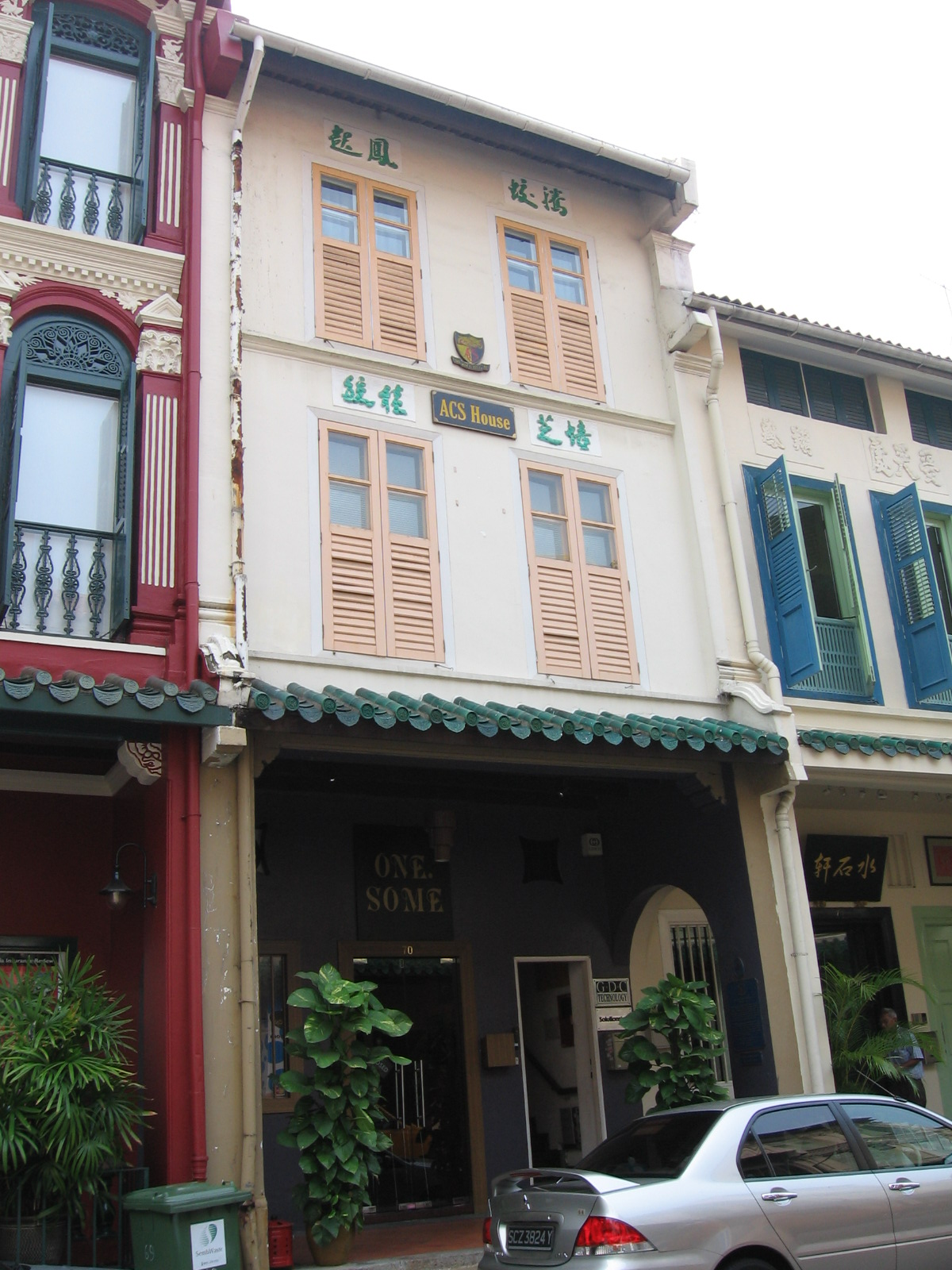
The ACS House along Amoy Street, the original premises of ACS

ACS was founded on 1 March 1886 by Bishop William Fitzjames Oldham as an extension of the Methodist Church in Singapore. Its first location was a shophouse at 70 Amoy Street with a total of 13 pupils. Its name came from the fact that it conducted lessons in English at night and Chinese in the afternoon. By the following year, enrolment had increased to 104, and the school moved to Coleman Street.

Between 1914 and 1920, led by Reverend J. S. Nagle, the school introduced regular religious services and physical education classes. Afternoon classes were also established for academically weaker pupils. In a bid to ensure continuity in school life and keep the school adequately staffed, Nagle encouraged former students, known as "old boys", to return to the school as teachers.

The Anglo-Chinese Continuation School was started by the new principal, Reverend P. L. Peach, in 1925, for students who had to leave the school due to the newly imposed age limits on school-going boys by the government. Eventually, ACS was renamed the Oldham Methodist School. A secondary school was opened at Cairnhill Road.

During the Japanese occupation of Singapore between 1942 and 1945, lessons were suspended, and the school re-opened its doors only in 1946, a year after the Japanese surrender, when the buildings at Cairnhill and Coleman Street were made safe from war damage. The pre-war principal, T. W. Hinch, who had been interned by the Japanese, returned to the school. He set up "X" and "Y" classes, each with different levels of difficulty, for students who had missed years of their education due to the Occupation. In September 1950, the secondary school moved from Cairnhill to Barker Road.

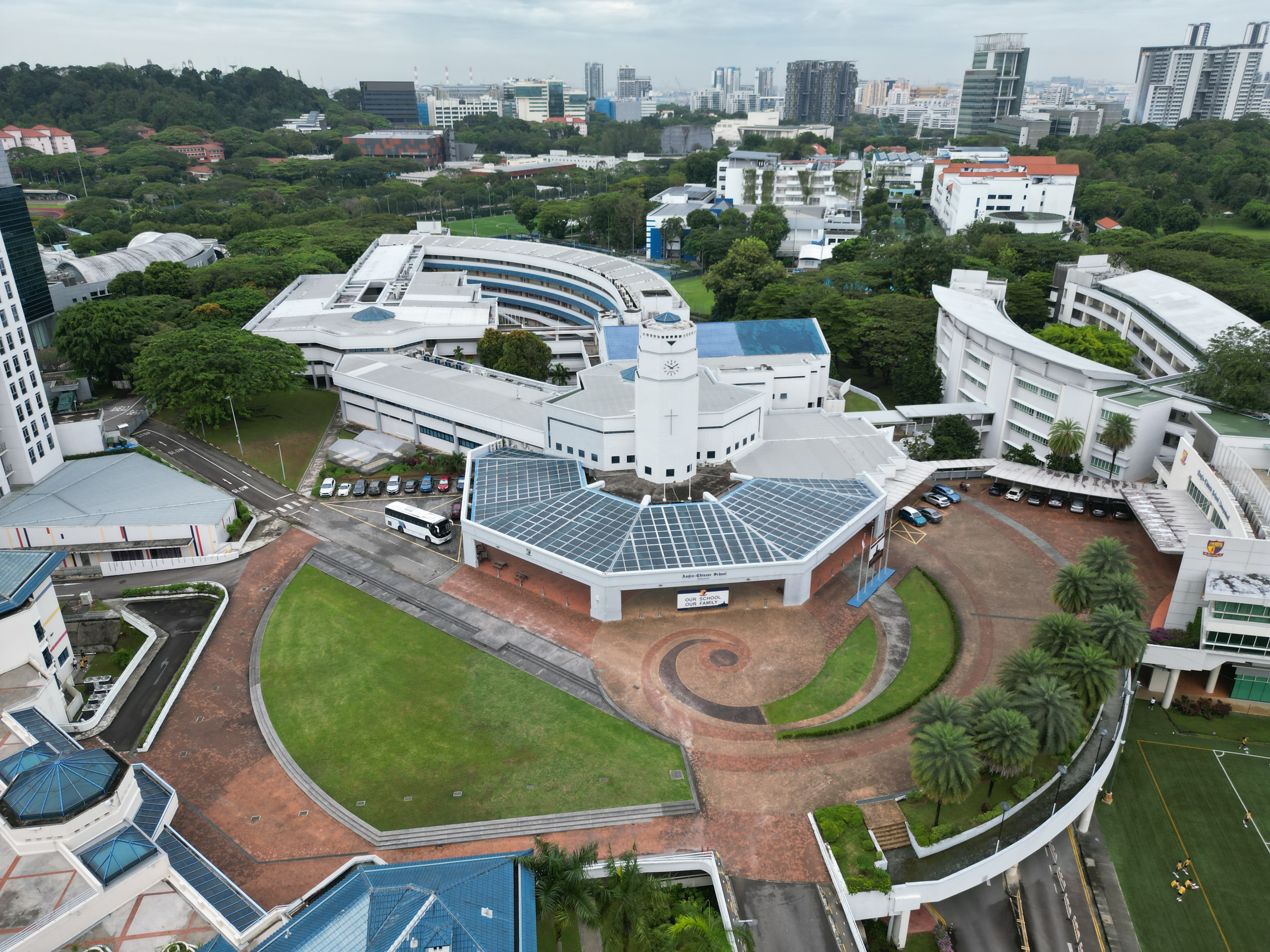
The ACS (Independent) Clock Tower from above

Also in 1950, Post School Certificate Classes, later known as Pre-University Classes because they were supposed to prepare students for tertiary education, were set up, and the first batch of girl students was enrolled in ACS. Students in the lower grades continued to be all-boys, a practice which persists to this day. Thio Chan Bee, the first Asian principal of ACS, took over in 1952. During his tenure, both the Cairnhill and Barker Road premises were expanded, the latter with the building of the Lee Hall, a three-storey building housing twelve classrooms and four laboratories.

ACSP moved out of the Coleman Street campus in 1994; in its place now are the National Archives. In 1988 the Ministry of Education started its Independent School programme. Independent schools are allowed to be privately funded and subject to less government regulation in setting out their curriculum. The school was renamed ACS (Independent); in 1993 the Barker Road campus was vacated and the school moved to Dover Road. After strong lobbying by alumni, the Barker Road site was retained for a second secondary school. At the same time, Anglo-Chinese Primary School abandoned Coleman Street (the old building now housing the National Archives of Singapore) to share premises with the new secondary school at Barker Road, now named ACS (Barker Road).

When Bishop Oldham started the school in 1886, he also took in some students as boarders. The boarding facility soon expanded and moved into ever-larger premises, first in Bellevue at Oldham Lane, then to Dunearn House at Barker Road. In 1986, when ACS celebrated its centennial year, the boarding school known as Oldham Hall moved into new premises within the ACS Barker Road campus. It moved back into the rebuilt premises in December 2002 and was renamed ACS Oldham Hall.

=== Principals ===
The principal of the school is also the school's chief executive officer. The first principal of the independent school was Lawrence Chia, an associate professor of chemistry at the National University of Singapore and a Presbyterian elder. Chia stepped down at the end of 1993 and one of his two vice-principals was selected to replace him. Ong Teck Chin held the post from 1994 to October 2010. From 5 October 2010, Fanny Tan was appointed acting principal in his stead, until the appointment of Winston James Hodge as new principal with effect from 21 June 2011. Then, in December 2018, Arene Koh was appointed as principal. In December 2025, Kevin Pang became the principal after the Ministry of Education's principal rotation for 2026.

=== Awards ===
ACS (Independent) was awarded the Singapore Quality Award (SQA) in October 2009. ACS (Independent) has achieved the Singapore Quality Award, all four Best Practice Awards, School Distinction and School Excellence Awards. ACS(I) has won The Straits Times' 'Top School in Sports (Boys)' award 14 times, starting with the first award in 1996 and winning thereafter every year until 2010, with the exception of 1999.

=== Examinations ===
In the GCE 'Ordinary' level examinations, ACS(I) had been ranked in the top 15 institutions in Singapore for a number of years since 1995. In 2008 it was reported that ACS(I) students taking the IB exams for the first time had produced results among the best in the world: nine students had obtained the perfect score of 45, making up almost half the 20 candidates worldwide to do so. It was also reported that ACS(I)'s performance put it among the top three IB schools in the world. In 2010, 27 students worldwide were reported to have achieved the perfect score, of whom 13 came from the ACS(I) November 2009 examination cohort. In 2011, it produced 28 students who earned the perfect score. The number of perfect scorers increased to 29 in 2012. and 37 in 2013. In 2014, the school produced 32 of the 43 students nationwide who obtained perfect scores. In 2015, 34 students scored the perfect score. In 2016, 41 scored the perfect score, accounting for the 48 in Singapore and 81 worldwide to do so. In 2018 ACS scored an average of 41.6 points per IBDP student making it the top IB school in the world as per the league tables published by Education Advisers Ltd.

== Campus ==
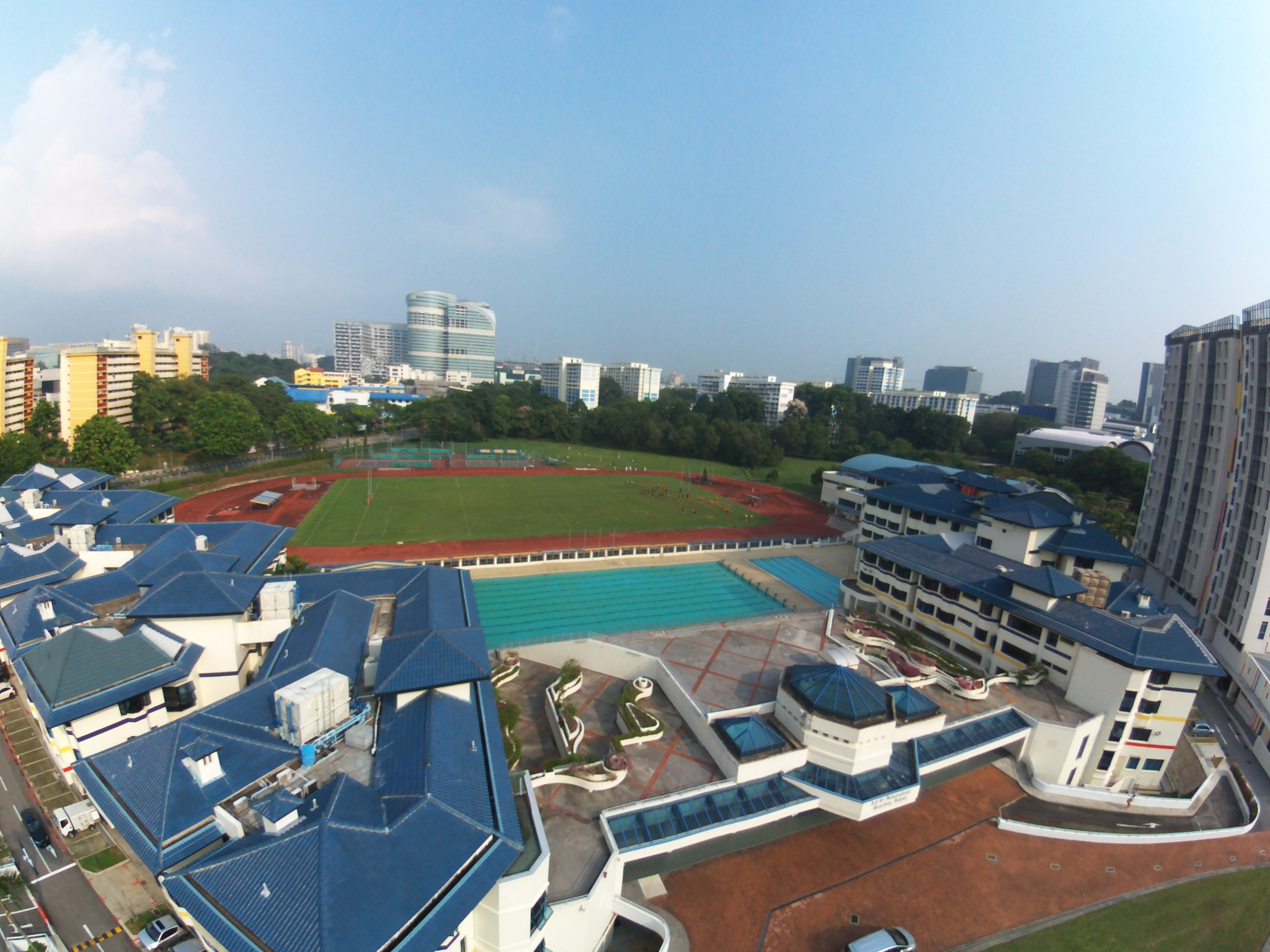
Sports Facilities

=== Facilities ===
ACS(Independent) has a number of facilities, including a campus-wide Wi-Fi network, air-conditioned classrooms, computer and science laboratories, multi-purpose halls, auditoriums, and lecture theatres. ACS(I)'s sports facilities include an artificial turf, track, rugby field, gymnasium, swimming pools and basketball, squash and tennis courts.

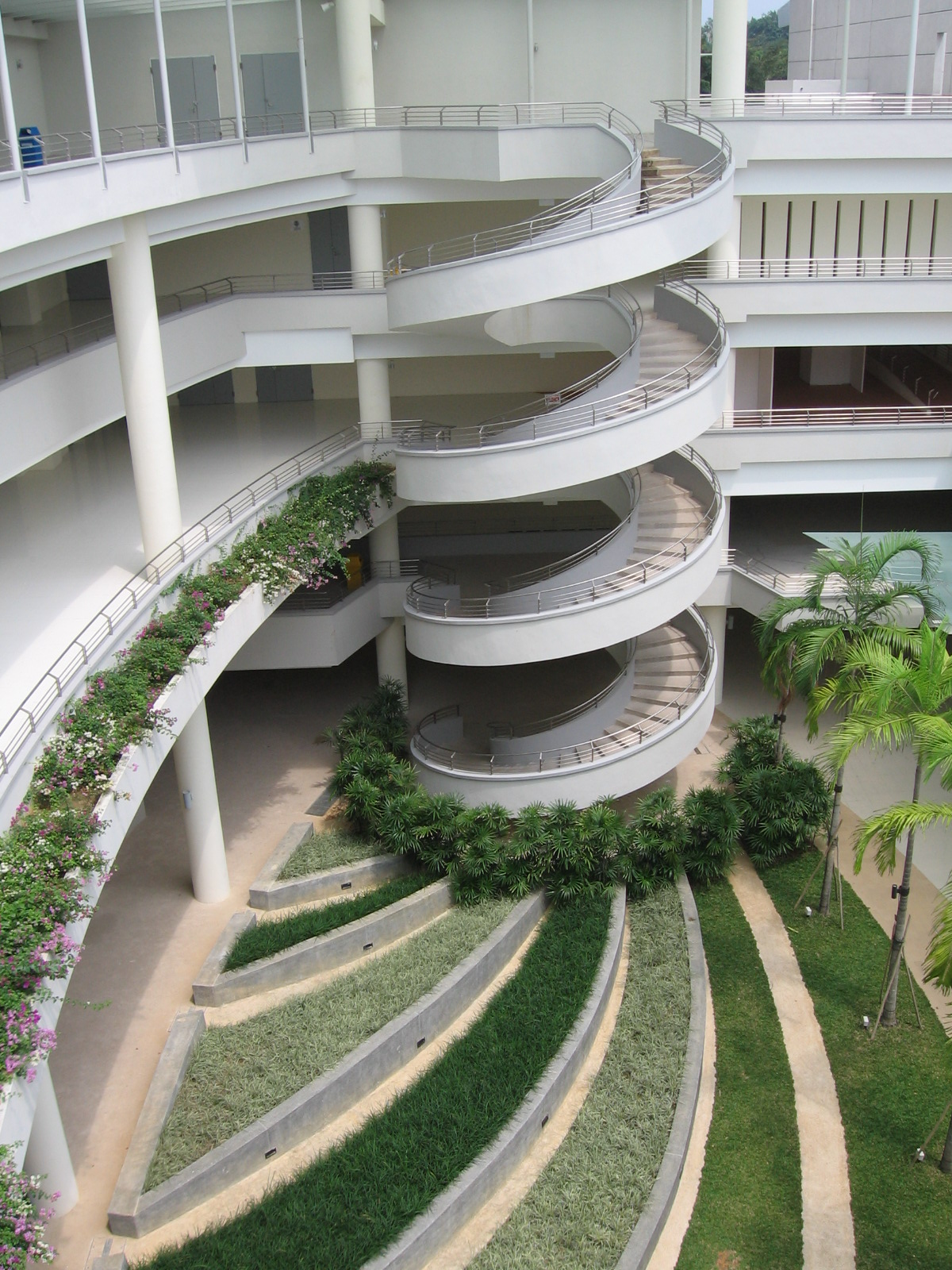
IB Block

=== Boarding school ===
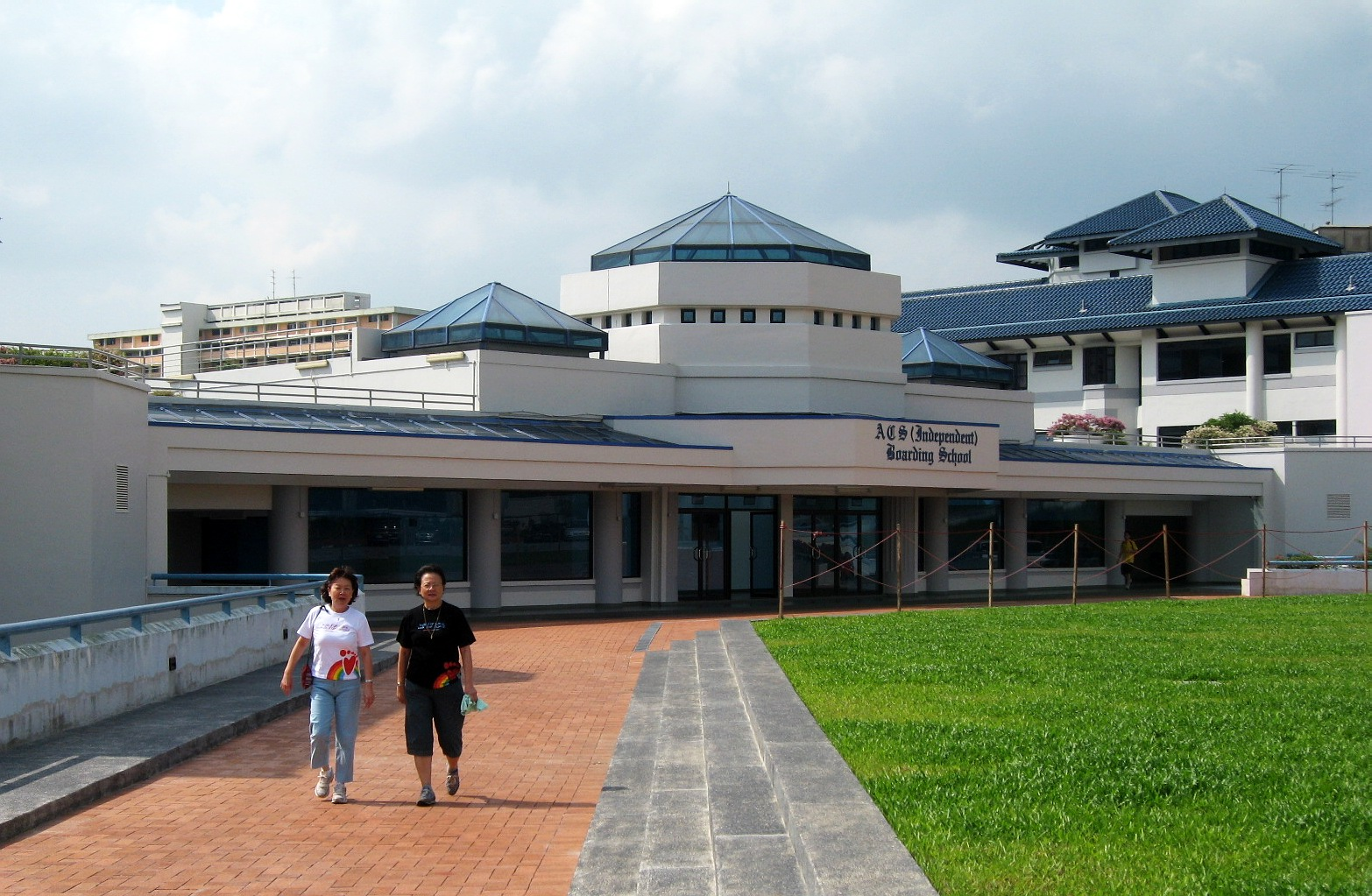
ACS (Independent) Boarding School

Established in 1994, the ACS (Independent) Boarding School houses around 500 students, mostly overseas scholars from the People's Republic of China, Indonesia, Vietnam, and Malaysia. Resident staff live alongside the students and provide a balance of academic and pastoral support.

=== The Shaw Library and Resource Centre ===
The library is named after its financial benefactor, Runme Shaw. It contains over 100,000 books, reference materials and IB syllabus-based course books.

== Achievements ==
=== Sports and games ===
ACS (Independent) has produced national champions and national sportsmen. It has been strong in swimming, sailing, water-polo and rugby. It has been The Straits Times' Top School in Sports (Boys) in an almost unbroken streak since this title was first awarded, from 1996 to 2009. The exception was 1999, in which The Chinese High School won the title. The record number of gold medals in a single season was achieved in 2018, where it won 17 gold medals and 10 silver medals. The school has held many winning streaks such as the "B" Division Rugby Title from 1997–2003 and the "C" Division Rugby Title from 1997–2009. In 2008, ACS (Independent) won a grand slam in Rugby, winning all three "A" Division, "B" Division and "C" Division titles, and the school has won multiple since.

==== National inter-schools championships ====
Note : Records from 1989 onwards; "A" Division records from 2007 onwards

- Air pistol
  - "C" Division: 2019
  - "B" Division: 2006, 2009
  - "A" Division: 2010, 2018
- Air rifle
  - "C" Division: 2003
  - "B" Division: 2010
- Badminton
  - "C" Division: 1996, 1997,2017
  - "B" Division: 1992, 1993, 1994, 1995, 1998, 2010, 2013, 2014, 2016, 2018, 2019
  - "A" Division: 2010, 2011, 2013, 2014, 2019
- Basketball
- Bowling
  - "C" Division: 1995, 1996, 1997, 1998, 2000, 2001, 2002, 2003, 2004, 2007, 2008, 2011, 2026
  - "B" Division: 1995, 1996, 1998, 2002, 2003, 2004, 2005, 2006, 2016, 2021, 2026
  - "A" Division: 2018, 2019, 2021, 2023, 2026
- Canoeing
  - "C" Division: 2000, 2004, 2010, 2013, 2019, 2025
  - "B" Division: 2000, 2004, 2006, 2007, 2008, 2009, 2010, 2011, 2012, 2014, 2015, 2023, 2024, 2025
  - "A" Division: 2008
- Cricket
  - "C" Division: 1996, 2000, 2003, 2004, 2005, 2006, 2008, 2009, 2016, 2017, 2018, 2019, 2022, 2023
  - "B" Division: 2003, 2006, 2007, 2008, 2009, 2012, 2016, 2018, 2019, 2022
  - "A" Division: 2010, 2014, 2016, 2017, 2019, 2022
- Golf
  - "C" Division: 2008, 2017, 2022
  - "B" Division: 2010, 2022
  - "A" Division: 2022
- Rugby (15-a-side)
  - "C" Division: 1993, 1995, 1997, 1998, 1999, 2000, 2001, 2002, 2003, 2004, 2005, 2006, 2007, 2008, 2009, 2011, 2014, 2016, 2017, 2018, 2019, 2022, 2023, 2024, 2026
  - "B" Division: 1997, 1998, 1999, 2000, 2001, 2002, 2003, 2007, 2008, 2010, 2011, 2013, 2015, 2016, 2017, 2019, 2022, 2024, 2025
  - "A" Division: 2008, 2011, 2012, 2014, 2015, 2016, 2017, 2018, 2019, 2022, 2023, 2024, 2025
- Sailing
  - "C" Division: 1999, 2000, 2001, 2004, 2006
  - "B" Division: 1996, 1998, 1999, 2000, 2001, 2004, 2006, 2008
  - "A Boys" Division: 2008
- Softball
  - "C" Division: 2017
  - "B" Division: 2006, 2007
  - "A" Division: 2007, 2008
- Squash
  - "C" Division: 1998, 1999, 2000, 2006, 2007, 2008, 2009, 2010, 2017, 2022
  - "B" Division: 1999, 2000, 2001, 2002, 2003, 2004, 2005, 2006, 2007, 2009, 2010, 2011, 2019, 2022, 2023, 2024
  - "A" Division: 2007, 2008, 2012, 2013, 2014, 2022
- Swimming
  - "C" Division: 1993, 1994, 1995, 1996, 1997, 1998, 2003, 2004, 2007, 2009, 2010, 2011, 2012, 2014, 2015, 2016, 2017, 2018, 2019, 2022
  - "B" Division: 1993, 1994, 1995, 1996, 1997, 1998, 2004, 2005, 2006, 2009, 2010, 2011, 2012, 2013, 2014, 2015, 2016, 2017, 2018, 2019
  - "A" Division: 2014, 2015, 2016, 2017, 2018, 2019, 2022
  - "A" Division girls: 2026
- Tennis
  - "C" Division: 1991, 1992, 1993, 1995, 1996, 1997, 1998, 2000, 2001, 2004, 2005, 2010, 2011, 2015, 2016, 2018, 2021, 2022, 2023, 2024
  - "B" Division: 1993, 1995, 1996, 1997, 2002, 2003, 2005, 2007, 2009, 2011, 2013, 2015, 2016, 2017, 2021, 2022, 2023, 2024
  - "A" Division: 2008, 2015, 2016, 2017, 2022, 2023
- Water-Polo
  - "C" Division: 1992, 1993, 1996, 1997, 1998, 2005, 2008, 2009, 2010, 2011, 2012, 2014, 2015, 2016, 2018
  - "B" Division: 1992, 1993, 1997, 1998, 1999, 2000, 2005, 2006, 2010, 2011, 2012, 2014, 2016, 2018, 2022, 2023
- X-Country
  - "C" Division: 2013, 2016, 2019
  - "B" Division: 2004, 2015, 2017
  - "A" Division: 2016, 2017

=== Uniformed groups ===
The school has also performed well in its uniformed groups, achieving Gold and Best Unit awards multiple times over the past years. In 2011, all of the school's units attained a Gold award. ACS (Independent) holds the record of having the largest amount of Uniformed Groups in a single school. In addition to this, ACS (Independent) is the only school with a National Cadet Corps Tri-Service, and one of two schools which pioneered the National Police Cadet Corps. The Scout and Venture Scout units of the school are also the largest in Singapore. The Boys' Brigade and Boys' Brigade Primers also encompasses the Boys' Brigade Bagpipe Band, one of only 15 in Singapore. However, the NPCC (Sea) unit and Military Bagpipe Band have since been shut down.

- National Cadet Corps (Air)
  - Best Unit Competition (Gold): 2001, 2002, 2003, 2004, 2005, 2006, 2007, 2008, 2009, 2010, 2011, 2012
  - Best NCC (Air) Unit: 2001, 2004, 2010, 2011, 2012, 2013, 2015
  - Best Overall NCC Unit: 2010 (discontinued)
  - C.M. Philips Award: 2011
- National Cadet Corps (Land)
  - Best Unit Competition (Gold): 2004, 2005, 2006, 2007, 2008, 2009, 2010, 2011
- National Cadet Corps (Sea)
  - Best Unit Competition (Gold): 2004, 2005, 2006, 2007, 2008, 2009, 2010, 2011
  - Best NCC (Sea) Unit: 2005, 2010, 2011
- National Civil Defence Cadet Corps
  - Unit Overall Proficiency Award (Gold): 2008, 2009, 2010, 2011, 2012, 2013, 2014, 2015, 2016, 2017
  - Precision Drill Competition (Champion): 2012
- National Police Cadet Corps
  - Unit Overall Proficiency Award (Gold): 2000, 2001, 2002, 2003, 2004, 2007, 2008, 2009, 2010, 2011, 2012, 2013, 2014, 2015
- Military Bagpipe Band
- Boys' Brigade
  - J.M. Fraser Award (Gold): 2001, 2002, 2003, 2004, 2005, 2006, 2007, 2008, 2010, 2011
  - Best Seniors' Company: 2006, 2007, 2008, 2010
- Boys' Brigade Primers
- Boys' Brigade Bagpipe Band
  - Boys' Brigade Pipes and Drums Festival BB Category (Champion): 2015, 2016, 2017
  - Boys' Brigade Pipes and Drums Festival Open Category (Champion): 2015, 2016, 2017
- Scouts
  - Frank Cooper Sands' Award (Gold): 2001, 2002, 2003, 2004, 2005, 2006, 2007, 2008, 2009, 2010, 2011, 2012, 2013, 2014, 2015, 2016, 2017, 2018, 2019, 2023, 2025
  - National Patrol Camp: 2008, 2009, 2010, 2013, 2016, 2018, 2025
- Venture Scouts
  - Frank Cooper Sands' Award (Gold): 2005, 2006, 2007, 2008, 2009, 2010, 2011, 2012, 2013, 2014, 2015, 2016, 2017, 2018, 2025
- St. John's Brigade
  - Corps Achievement Award (Gold): 2002, 2003, 2005, 2006, 2007, 2008, 2009, 2010, 2011, 2012, 2013, 2014, 2015, 2016, 2017, 2018

=== Clubs, societies and performing arts ===
ACS (Independent) Debate Team members have represented Singapore at the World Schools Debating Championships, including in the Championship title win in 2015 and the 1st Runner-Up result in 2007. ACS(I) emerged National Champion in 1998, 2005 and 2013 as well as 1st Runner-Up in 2004, 2006 and 2016 at the Singapore Secondary Schools Debating Championships. At the national championships for pre-university levels organised by the Singapore Ministry of Education, ACS(I) emerged champion in 2010 and 2018 as well as 1st Runner-Up in 2012, 2014, 2019 and 2025. In the Ministry of Finance Budget Debate Challenge ACS(I) emerged Secondary School division Champion in 2010 and Pre-University division 1st Runner-Up in 2009 and 2010.

The Symphonic Band won Gold with Honours awards in the 2005, 2007 and 2009 SYF competitions, being the only school besides Saint Patrick's School to have achieved this. It was ranked as one of the top three bands in all three years. The band also received a Gold in the 2011 competition. The Wind Ensemble received a Gold in its first year of participation in SYF in 2007, as well as a Bronze in 2009 and a Silver in 2011. In 2006, the band took part in the 17th Australian International Music Festival in Sydney, Australia, attaining a Gold Award. In the Singapore International Band Festival 2008, the band competed against professional bands in the open division and won the only Gold award, it also achieved second place in the Finals. In the SIBF competition for 2010, the band achieved Silver in the Open Category, while in 2012, the Symphonic Band was awarded a Gold in Division II and the Wind Ensemble was awarded Silver in Division I. In 2011, both the Symphonic Band and Wind Ensemble participated in the Senior Category at the Hong Kong Winter Band Festival, attaining Silver and Gold (2nd Placing) respectively. The Symphonic Band has also received Distinction Awards at the 2013 and 2015 Singapore Youth Festival Arts Presentation for Concert Bands.

The Choir, established in the 1980s, has taken part in many international and local choral competitions and workshops. The Choir has achieved a Gold award in the 2009 SYF Central Judging, as well as a Gold award in the recent 2011 SYF Central Judging. The Choir also obtained a Gold award at the Genting International Choral Competition in 2007. The IB choir now performs as an a cappella society.

== Notable alumni ==
- Politicians
  - Vivian Balakrishnan, Minister for Foreign Affairs, Singapore
  - Chen Show Mao, former Member of Parliament, Singapore
  - Chiam See Tong, former Member of Parliament and Head of the Singapore People's Party, Singapore
  - Eileen Chong (politician), Non-Constituency Member of Parliament, Singapore
  - Fong Jen Arthur, former Member of Parliament, Singapore
  - Geh Min, Nominated Member of Parliament, Singapore
  - Goh Keng Swee, former Deputy Prime Minister, Minister for Defence, Minister for Finance and Minister for Education, Singapore
  - Ho Peng Kee, former Senior Minister of State for Home Affairs, Singapore
  - Dr Richard Hu, former Minister for Finance and Minister for Trade and Industry, Singapore
  - Lam Pin Min, former Member of Parliament, Singapore
  - Lee Teng-hui, first President of Fudan University, Shanghai, China
  - Alvin Lie Ling Piao, member of People's Representative Council of Indonesia as the representative of National Mandate Party
  - Lim Kim San, former cabinet minister, Chairman of the Housing and Development Board and Chairman of the Port of Singapore Authority, Singapore
  - Lui Tuck Yew, former Minister for Transport and former Second Minister for Foreign Affairs, former Chief of Navy and former Chief Executive of the Maritime and Port Authority, Singapore
  - Sellapan Ramanathan, 6th President of Singapore
  - Ng Eng Hen, former Education Minister and former Defence Minister, Singapore
  - Sin Boon Ann, former Member of Parliament, Singapore
  - Tan Chuan Jin, Former Speaker of Parliament, Singapore
  - Tan Soo Khoon, former Member of Parliament, former Speaker of Parliament, Singapore
  - Dr Tay Eng Soon, deceased Senior Minister of State (Education), Singapore
  - Tharman Shanmugaratnam, 9th President of Singapore
  - Toh Chin Chye, Former Deputy Prime Minister, Singapore
  - Yeo Cheow Tong, former Member of Parliament, former Minister for Transport, Singapore
  - Alvin Yeo, Senior Counsel, deceased Senior Partner of WongPartnership LLP and former Member of Parliament, Singapore
  - Charles Yeo, lawyer and former chairman of Reform Party
  - Gerald Giam, Member of Parliament for Aljunied GRC
  - Yuen Pau Woo, Canadian Senator representing British Columbia
  - Chee Soon Juan, Secretary-General of the Singapore Democratic Party
  - Alvin Tan, Minister of State for National Development and Minister of State for Trade and Industry
  - Hamid Razak, Member of Parliament for West Coast–Jurong West GRC
- Athletes
  - Ang Peng Siong, former Singapore national swimmer, co-founder and Managing Director of APS Swim School & Aquatic Performance Swim Club
  - Mark Chay, Singapore national swimmer
  - Desmond Koh, former Singapore national swimmer, Rhodes Scholar
  - Joseph Schooling, national swimmer, participated in the 2012 London Olympics, gold medallist in the 2016 Rio Olympics
  - Quah Zheng Wen, national swimmer, participated in the 2012 London Olympics
  - Oon Jin Teik, CEO of Singapore Sports Council and former Singapore national swimmer
  - Poh Seng Song, Singapore national sprinter
  - Ronald Susilo, Former Singapore national badminton player
  - Gary Tan, Singapore national swimmer
  - Thum Ping Tjin, former Singapore national swimmer, Rhodes Scholar
- Business leaders
  - Lim Siong Guan, former Head of Singapore Civil Service, Group President of Government of Singapore Investment Corporation
  - Ong Beng Seng, Managing Director Hotel Properties Limited
  - Seow Poh Leng, founding member of the Ho Hong Bank
  - Tan Sri Dr. Tan Chin Tuan, former Chairman of Oversea-Chinese Banking Corporation, philanthropist
  - Tan Sri Dato' Sri Dr. Teh Hong Piow, Chairman of Public Bank

- Arts
  - Terence Cao, Mediacorp 8 actor
  - Mark Chan, composer and former Singapore national swimmer
  - Glen Goei, international director
  - Colin Goh, filmmaker and editor of TalkingCock.com
  - Goh Soon Tioe, violinist and conductor of Singapore Youth Symphony Orchestra
  - Ivan Heng, actor, director
  - Nat Ho, Actor
  - Kevin Kwan, novelist, best known for the bestselling satirical novels Crazy Rich Asians, China Rich Girlfriend, and Rich People Problems
  - Hossan Leong, actor, Radio DJ
  - Lin Junjie (Wayne Lim Jun Jie), singer
  - James Lye, former TV actor
  - Ong Keng Sen, director
  - Adrian Pang, actor
  - Bernard Tan, musician and composer
  - Melvyn Tan, international pianist
  - Eleanor Wong, playwright
  - Russel Wong, photographer
  - Jerrold Yam, poet and lawyer
- Other professions
  - Alex Au, social activist
  - Belinda Ang, Singapore Supreme Court Judge
  - Cavinder Bull, Senior Counsel
  - Choo Han Teck, Supreme Court Judge
  - Steven Chong, Judge of Appeal
  - Winston Choo, Lieutenant-General (Retired), former Chief of the Defence Force, Singapore Armed Forces, Chairman of Singapore Red Cross
  - Khoo Boon Hui, Senior Deputy Secretary, Ministry of Home Affairs, President of INTERPOL and former Commissioner of Police
  - Glenn Knight, lawyer
  - Lieutenant General Desmond Kuek Bak Chye, former Chief of the Defence Force, Singapore Armed Forces
  - Li Denghui, founding President (1917–1937) of Fudan University
  - Professor Lim Kok Ann, Dean of Medicine NUS (1965–72), President of Singapore Chess Federation (1961–72)
  - Lieutenant General Melvyn Ong, former Chief of Defence Force, Singapore Army
  - Andrew Phang, Judge of Appeal
  - V K Rajah, Judge of Appeal, Attorney-General of Singapore (2014-2017)
  - Lucien Wong, Attorney-General of Singapore (2017–Present), Senior Counsel
  - Sim Kee Boon, former head of Singapore Civil Service
  - Rear Admiral Ronnie Tay, former Chief of Navy, Republic of Singapore Navy
  - Rear Admiral Frederick Chew, Director of Joint Operations, Singapore Armed Forces
  - Woo Bih Li, Singapore Supreme Court Judge
  - Wong Meng Kong, chess Grandmaster

== See also ==
- Methodist Girls' School (Secondary)
- Anglo-Chinese School (Barker Road)

== Notes ==
1. ^ https://web.archive.org/web/20070930224744/http://www.moe.gov.sg/press/2004/pr2004sea_sda.htm", School Excellence Award (SEA), Ministry of Education, Singapore, 2006
