= Tan Chin Tuan Mansion =

Mansion in Singapore

Coordinates: 1°18′19″N 103°50′15″E

Tan Chin Tuan Mansion is a historic mansion at the junction of Cairnhill Road and Cairnhill Circle in Cairnhill, Singapore. Completed in 1926, it served as the residence of banker and philanthropist Tan Chin Tuan and his family. In 2007, it was integrated into a condominium as its clubhouse.

== Architecture ==
The mansion was built in the Beaux-Arts style. It features a porte-cochère accompanied by columns of the Ionic order. The mansion's façade features "rich ornamentation and detailing." The building features a bell-shaped turret, which was once a common feature of mansions and bungalows in Singapore. Its interior features teak doors and panels, as well as terrazzo tiles of the Art Nouveau style. Plaster cornices can be found on the ceiling of the room above the mansion's porch.

== History ==
The mansion was designed by Chung Hong Woot of the architectural firm Chung & Wong. It was built for community leader Tan Kah Kee in 1926. However, he sold off the mansion to raise funds for the construction of the Xiamen University in Fujian, China. In 1939, prominent banker and philanthropist Tan Chin Tuan purchased the mansion. It served as the private residence of Tan and his family for decades.

The mansion was gazetted for conservation by the Urban Redevelopment Authority on 19 May 2003. A 20-storey luxury condominium was built over the mansion in the 2000s, with the mansion being restored and integrated into the development as its clubhouse. The construction work cost $3 million and took four years, completing in 2007. In 2008, the building received the URA Architectural Heritage Award for its "successful integration of old and new." Rachel Lau of Rice Media included the mansion on her list of the "lamest attempts" at building conservation in Singapore, writing that the mansion is "destined forever to be the bigger building's footstool".
