= Li Denghui (educator) =

Chinese educator

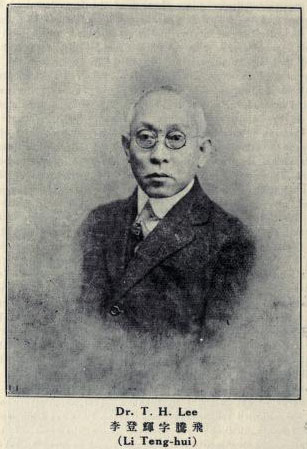

Li Denghui (Chinese: 李登輝; Pe̍h-ōe-jī: Lí Teng-hui, 1873–1947, courtesy name Téngfēi (Chinese: 騰飛; Pe̍h-ōe-jī: Thêng-hui)), also Lee Teng Hwee, was the president of Fudan University of Shanghai, 1917–1937.

== Biography ==
Li's ancestors came from the Tong'an District, Fujian, but he was born in Batavia, Dutch East Indies (present day Jakarta). He went to study in Singapore at the Anglo-Chinese School, where he became a Christian. He then continued at Yale University, becoming one of the first Nanyang Chinese to study there. He graduated with a BA degree in 1899.

Upon his return from the United States, Li founded an educational institute in Batavia, called Yale Institute. He also taught in a school founded by the Chinese Indonesians, Tiong Hoa Hwee Koan, with the hope of transforming the Chinese community overseas.

When he realized that he was not very successful at providing new kind of education for his people, Li went to Penang, Malaysia and met with a number of his friends with similar ideals. He then decided to move to Shanghai, China. He arrived in Shanghai in October 1904, organized the World Chinese Student Federation in July 1905 and became its first President, aiming to promote social justice in China, unite Chinese students studying overseas, and help members secure employment, medical care and legal advice. Similar associations were set up in Penang, Qingdao, Fuzhou, Hawaii and Singapore. Most of the original members of the federation were Christians and patriots.

At about the same time, Li became a supervisor of Fudan Public School. In 1913, when the founder of the school had to leave China, Li became its principal, teaching several subjects such as English, logic and philosophy. In 1917, when Fudan Public School became a university with a modern curriculum in the humanities, natural sciences and business as well as modern European languages, he became its first President.
