= Anglo-Chinese School =

Family of schools in Singapore

District information
- Type: Independent
- Motto: The Best is Yet To Be
- Established: 1 March 1886; 140 years ago
- Governing agency: Ministry of Education; Methodist Church of Singapore
- Schools: Anglo-Chinese School (Junior); Anglo-Chinese School (Primary); Anglo-Chinese School (Barker Road); Anglo-Chinese School (Independent); Anglo-Chinese School (International); Anglo-Chinese Junior College; ACS Bali

Students and staff
- Colors: Red; Blue; Gold

Anglo-Chinese School (ACS) is a family of Methodist schools in Singapore and Indonesia. It was founded in 1886 by Bishop William Fitzjames Oldham as an extension of the Methodist Episcopal Church. Its students and alumni are referred to as "ACSians" (/ˈɑksiɑn/). ACS was the first school in Singapore to have a flower named after it, the "Ascocenda Anglo-Chinese School orchid", a hybrid created by the school to mark its 116th Founder's Day on 1 March 2002.

== History ==
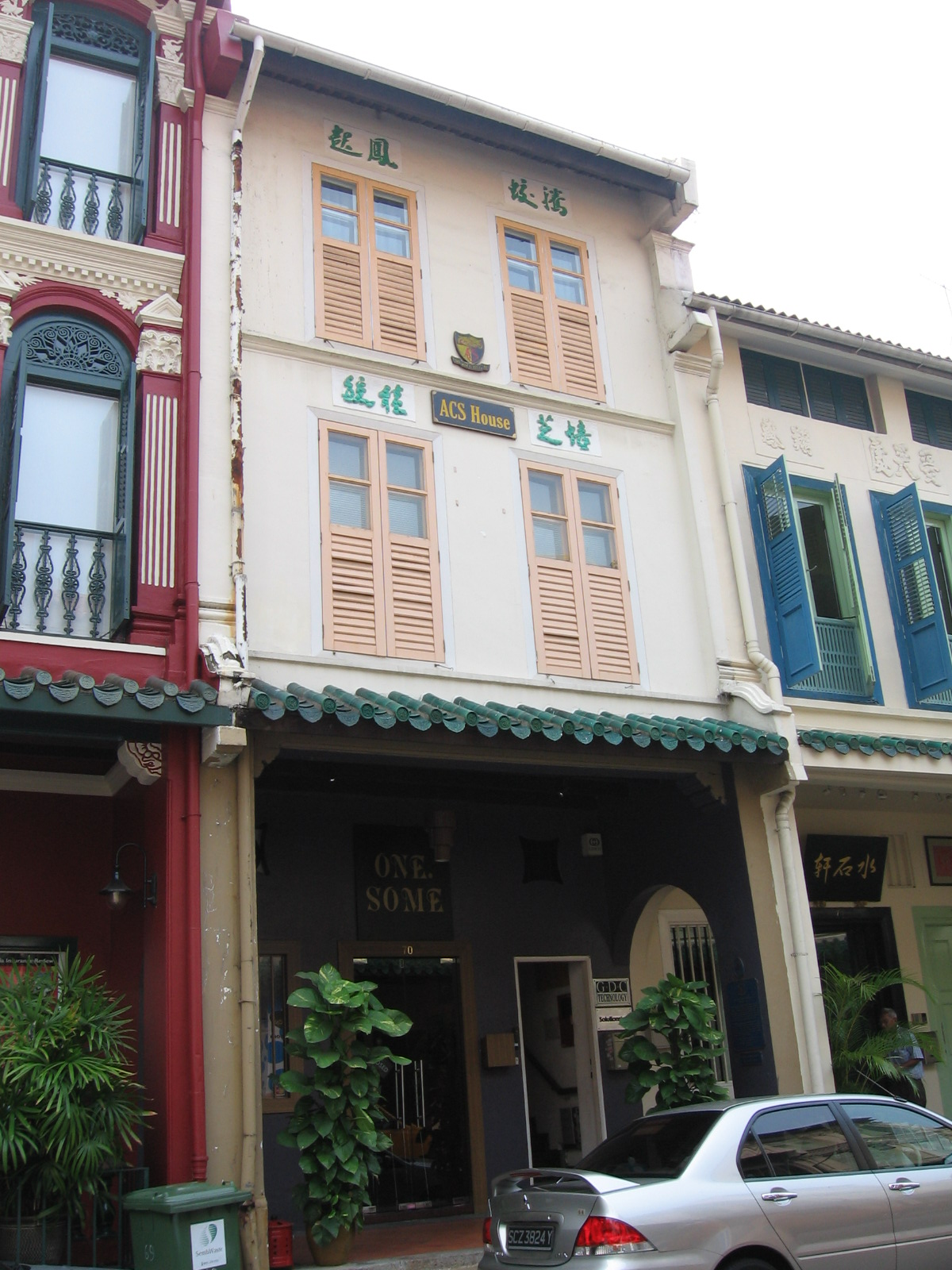
The ACS House along Amoy Street, the original premises of ACS

Founded on 1 March 1886 by Bishop William Fitzjames Oldham as an extension of the Methodist Church, the school was a shophouse at 70 Amoy Street, Singapore with 13 pupils. The name of the school came from its conducting lessons in Chinese in the morning and English in the afternoon. By the following year, enrollment was 104 and the school moved to Coleman Street.

== Houses ==
Anglo-Chinese School — Houses
House	Colour	Hex code
Oldham	Red	#C62828
Thoburn	Green	#2E7D32
GHK	Yellow	#FDD835
CKS	Blue	#1565C0
SVM	Purple	#6A1B9A
LSG	Grey	#9E9E9E
TKK	Dark blue	#0D47A1
TCT	Orange	#EF6C00

Between 1914 and 1920, under Reverend J. S. Nagle, the school introduced religious (or "chapel") services and physical education classes. Afternoon classes were started for academically weak pupils. In a bid to ensure continuity in school life and keep the school adequately staffed, Nagle encouraged ex-students, known as "old boys", to join the school as teachers. The Anglo-Chinese School Old Boys' Association is a link through which many "old boys" continue to maintain close ties with the school.

The Anglo-Chinese Continuation School started in 1925 under a new principal, the Reverend P.L. Peach, who had to leave the school due to the newly imposed government age limits on school attendance by boys. ACS became Oldham Methodist School while a secondary school opened in Cairnhill Road.

During the World War II Japanese occupation of Singapore between 1942 and 1945, lessons were suspended. The school opened again in 1946, a year after the Japanese surrender, once the buildings at Cairnhill and Coleman Street had been made safe following damage sustained during the war. The pre-war principal, T. W. Hinch, who had been interned by the Japanese during the occupation and had been sent back to England to recover, returned to the school in June 1946. He set up "X" and "Y" classes, each with different levels of difficulty, for students who had missed their education due to the occupation. In September 1950, the secondary school relocated from Cairnhill Street to Barker Road.

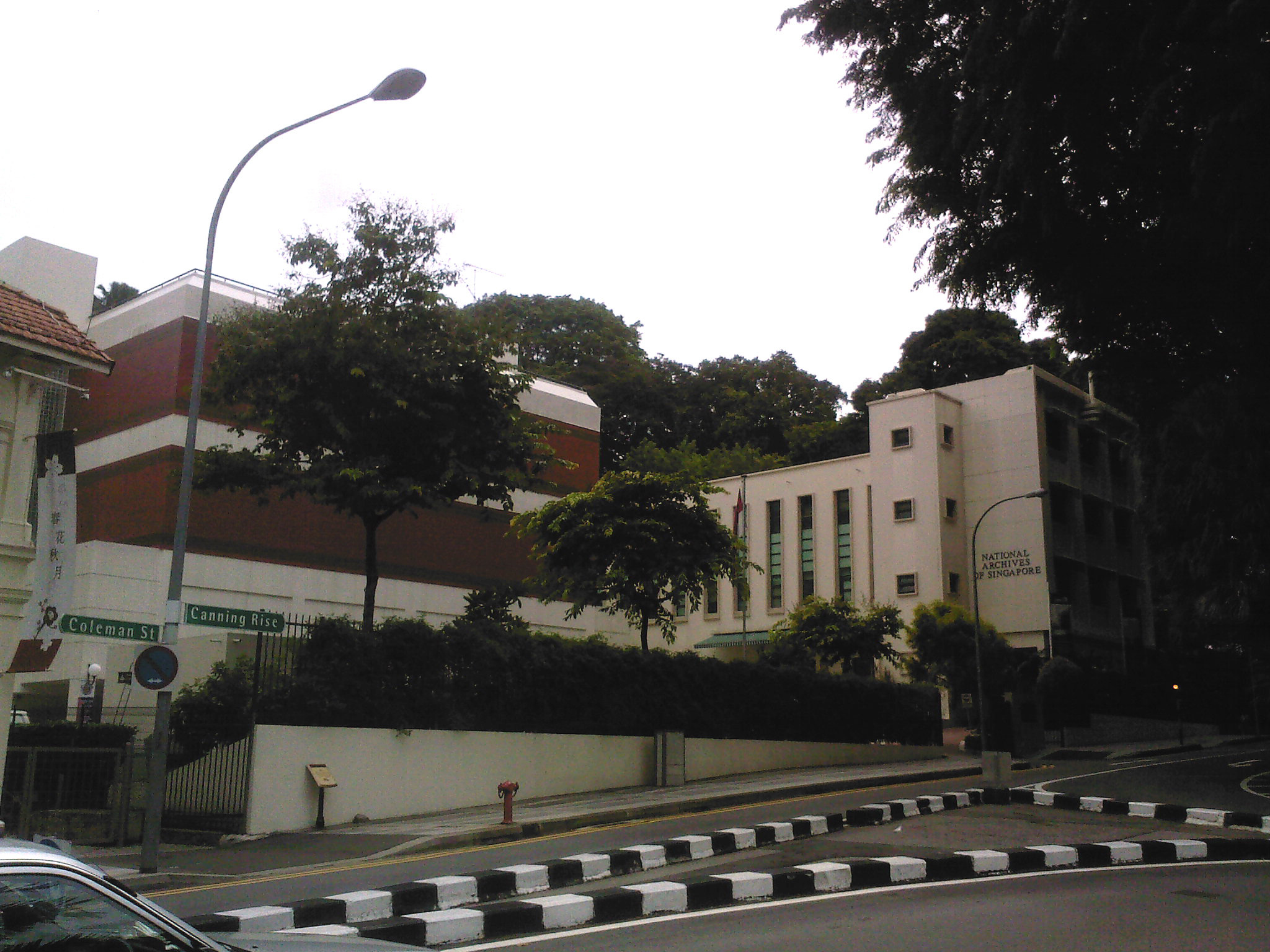
ACPS moved out of the Coleman Street campus in 1994; in its place now are the National Archives.

In 1988, when the Ministry of Education started its independent school program, the school reorganized. New regulations allowed schools access to private funding and subjected them to less government regulation in the content of their curricula. Renamed ACS (Independent), in 1993 the school vacated the Barker Road campus and moved to Dover Road. After strong lobbying by alumni, the Barker Road site became the site of a second secondary school. At the same time, the Anglo-Chinese Primary School abandoned its Coleman Street premises (the old building now housing the National Archives of Singapore) to share premises with the new secondary school at Barker Road, now named ACS (Barker Road).

== Schools ==
=== Anglo-Chinese School (Primary) ===
Anglo-Chinese School (Primary) (ACSP) was separated from the secondary classes in 1928 and was located at Coleman Street while the secondary classes moved to the new building at Cairnhill. In 1951, a branch school was established at Barker Road. In 1957, ACPS in Coleman Street catered to pupils from Primary 1 to 3 while Primary 4 to 6 classes remained known as ACJS. In 1961, leaving the Barker Road campus to be used for secondary and pre-university classes, Mr Lau Hee Boon became the first autonomous principal of ACPS with pupils from Primary 1 to 6, incorporating the Oldham Methodist Primary School with classes from Primary 1 to 6 in the afternoon. At the end of 1984, the junior school moved to 25 Peck Hay Road, while the primary school continued lessons at Canning Rise until 1994. It merged with the Barker Road school in that year, but in December 1998 relocated temporarily to 9 Ah Hood Road while waiting for the completion of the Barker Road campus rebuilding project. The school moved back to Barker Road on 4 December 2002.

=== Anglo-Chinese School (Independent) ===
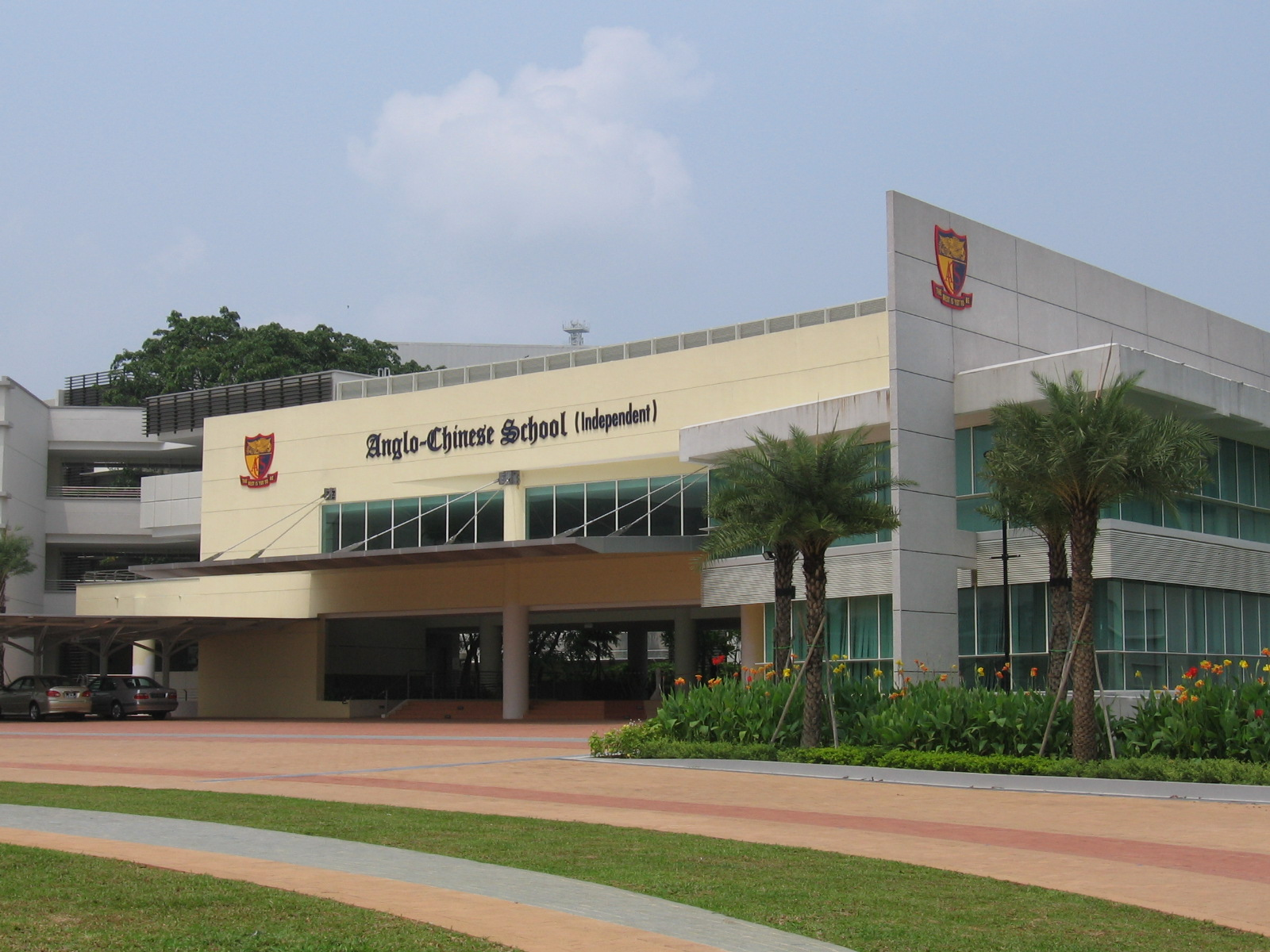
Anglo-Chinese School (Independent)

Anglo-Chinese School obtained its independence status from MOE in 1988. In 1988, Anglo-Chinese Secondary School was renamed Anglo-Chinese School (Independent). After receiving its independent status, the school had outgrown the Barker Road campus and plans were made to construct a new building. It relocated to 121 Dover Road in 1992.

=== Anglo-Chinese School (Barker Road) ===
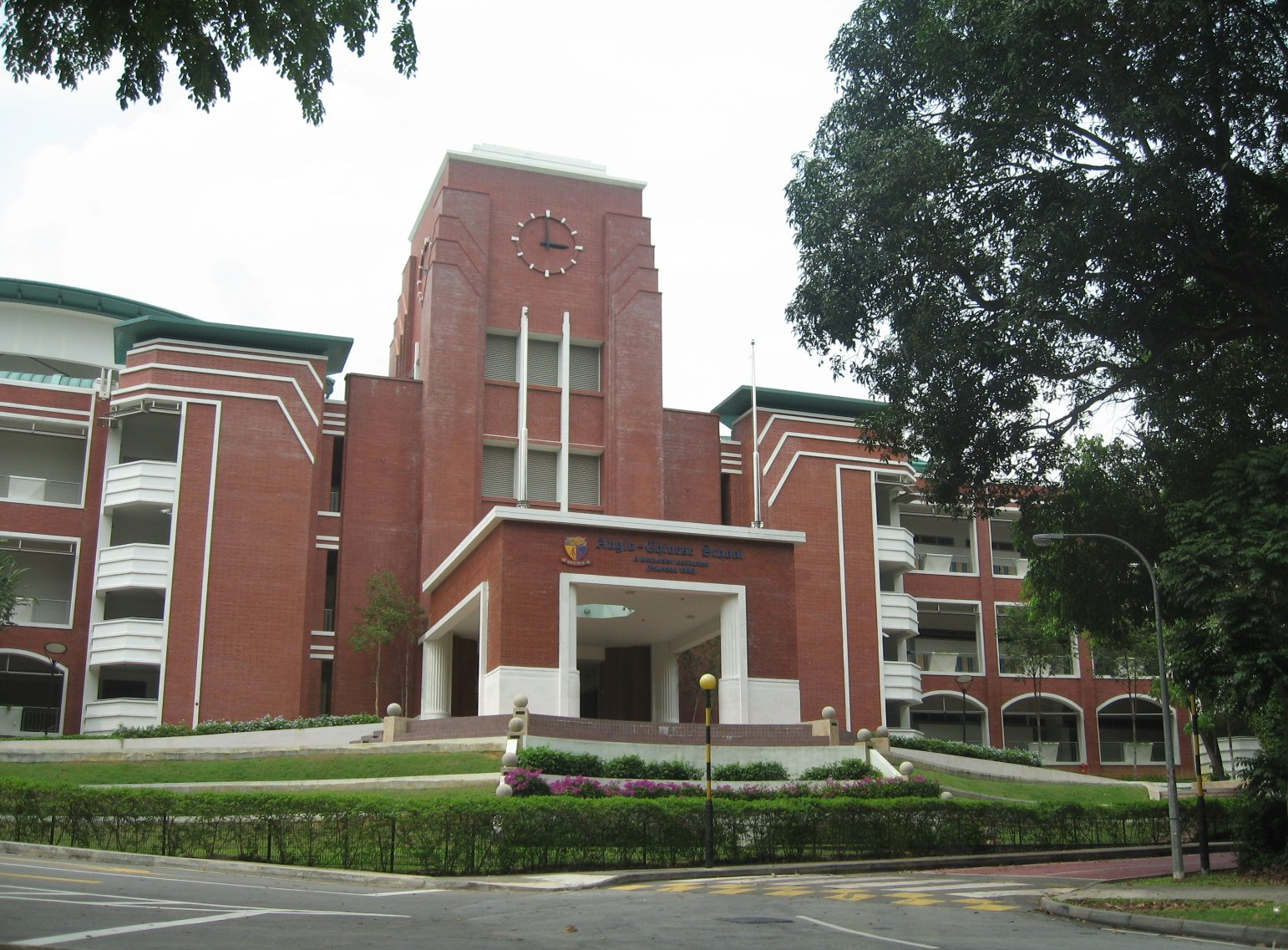
Anglo-Chinese School (Barker Road)

Anglo-Chinese School (Barker Road) opened in 1994 and is located at the Barker Road campus. It moved to the former Swiss Cottage Primary School while awaiting completion of the Barker Road rebuilding project. The school was divided into primary and secondary sections, the latter retaining the Barker Road suffix and the former later becoming ACS (Primary).

=== Anglo-Chinese School (International) ===
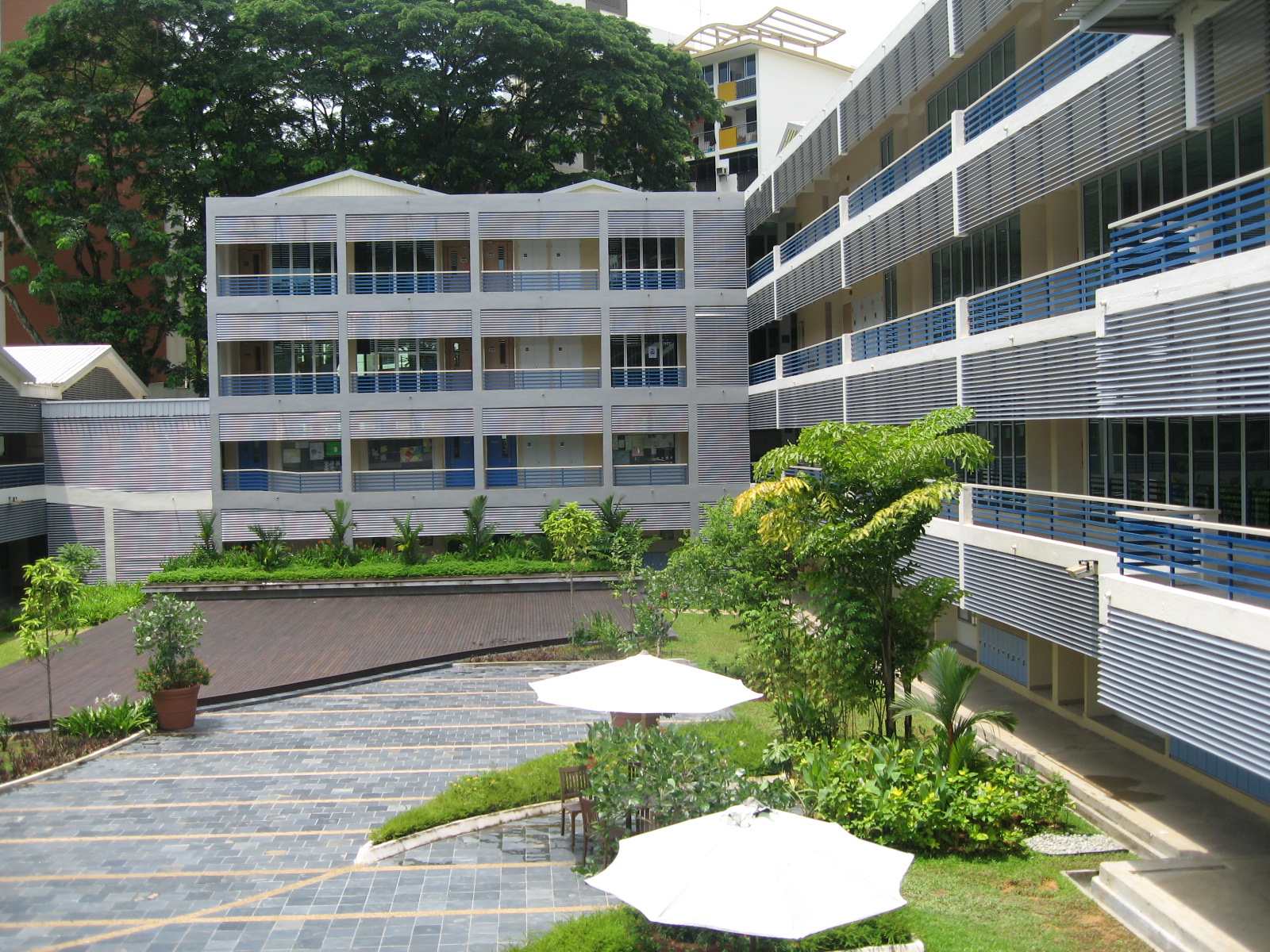
ACS (International)

Anglo-Chinese School (International) is a private school. The school opened in January 2005 with 150 students and is located in Holland Village on the former premises of the now defunct Buona Vista Secondary School at 61 Jalan Hitam Manis.

From January 2026, a 10-storey elementary school building on the same site as its high school can accommodate 450 pupils from seven years of age to 12. The pupils will follow the Cambridge Primary curriculum offered by Cambridge International Education.

=== Anglo-Chinese Junior College ===
Anglo-Chinese Junior College opened in 1977, and is located at 25 Dover Close East.

=== ACS Jakarta ===
ACS Jakarta began in July 1996 as Sekolah Tiara Bangsa (STB) before entering a partnership with ACS in 2002. It became known as ACS Jakarta in 2006.The school admits boys and girls from nursery to grade 12 (3 – 18 years old). Students sit for the Cambridge Primary Checkpoint Test at the end of Grade 6, the Cambridge International General Certificate of Secondary Education at the end of grade 10, and the International Baccalaureate at the end of grade 12.

=== ACS Bali ===
ACS Bali opened in July 2025, and offers the IGCSE program and the International Baccalaureate diploma programme.

== Notable alumni ==
- Vivian Balakrishnan, Minister for Foreign Affairs
- Joseph Schooling, national swimmer, Olympics Gold Medallist
- Tharman Shanmugaratnam, 9th President of Singapore
- Lim Nee Soon, business and community leader
- Dr Ng Eng Hen, former Minister for Defence
- Lim Siong Guan, Advisor and former President of GIC from 2007 to 2016, Head of Singapore Civil Service
- Seow Poh Leng, prominent banker and philanthropist
- Adrian Lim, murderer, dropped out
- Lim Bo Seng, resistance fighter
- Adrian Tan, lawyer, President of the Law Society of Singapore
- Tan Chin Tuan, prominent banker and philanthropist
- Tay Eng Soon, former Senior Minister of State for Education, Singapore
