= Amoy Street, Singapore =

Street in Singapore

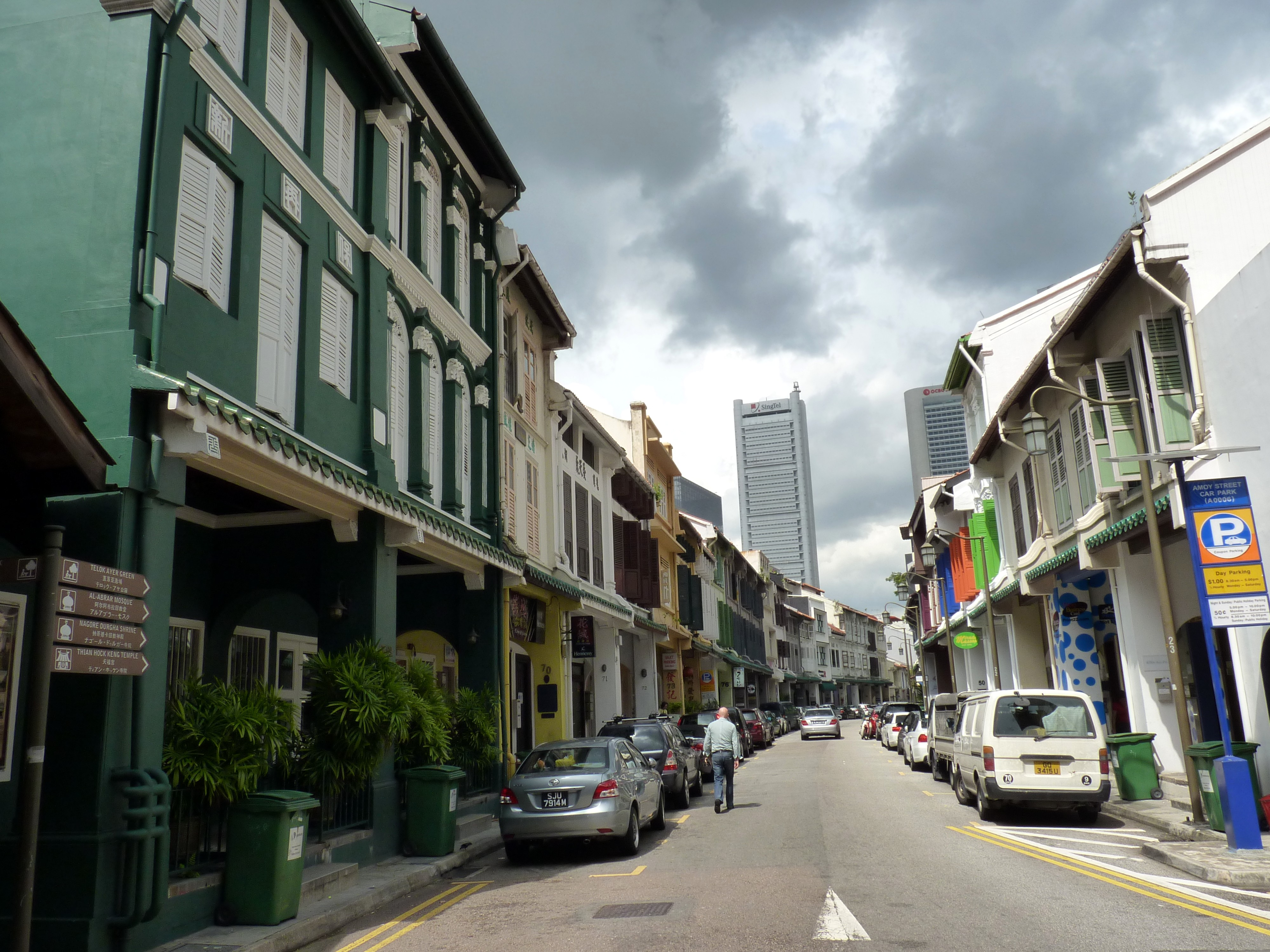
- Interactive map of Amoy Street, Singapore
- Namesake: Xiamen
- Nearest metro station: Telok Ayer MRT station
- Coordinates: 1.2814156°N 103.8473785°E

Amoy Street (simplified Chinese: 厦门街; traditional Chinese: 廈門街) is a one-way street located within Chinatown, within the Outram district in Singapore. The street is close to Tanjong Pagar MRT station.

Amoy Street starts at its junction with Telok Ayer Street and McCallum Street and ends with its junction with Pekin Street, now a pedestrian mall. It is intersected by Boon Tat Street and Cross Street.

== Etymology and history ==
The name Amoy is an English transliteration of the Zhangzhou pronunciation of the words 厦门 (pronounced Ē-mn̂g in Standard Hokkien (Amoy).) The Zhangzhou Hokkien pronunciation Ē-mûi was used instead of Standard Amoy Hokkien might because of the overwhelming numbers of Zhangzhou people who left Amoy in China to settle in Singapore through the city's port. Amoy Street is one of the old streets developed during the 1830s defining Chinatown under Stamford Raffles' 1822 Plan.

In George Drumgoole Coleman's 1836 Map of Singapore, the street was labelled as "Amoi Street", likely as a reference to the many migrants who came from Amoy.

Amoy Street was noted for its opium smoking dens. The street was given many names by the local Chinese based on the landmarks located there. In Hokkien, it was called the ma cho keng au (rear of the Ma Cho Temple), in Cantonese, the kun yam miu hau kai (behind the Kun Yam temple). In both dialects, it referred to Thian Hock Keng located on Telok Ayer Street where both goddesses were worshipped.

Also in Cantonese, the street is also known as ha mun kai, ha mun being the Cantonese pronunciation of the characters.

Colloquially, the street was also known as Free School Street or ghi oh khau (义学口 front of the school) as the Cui Ying School was built here in 1854.

== Notable locations ==
=== Anglo-Chinese School ===
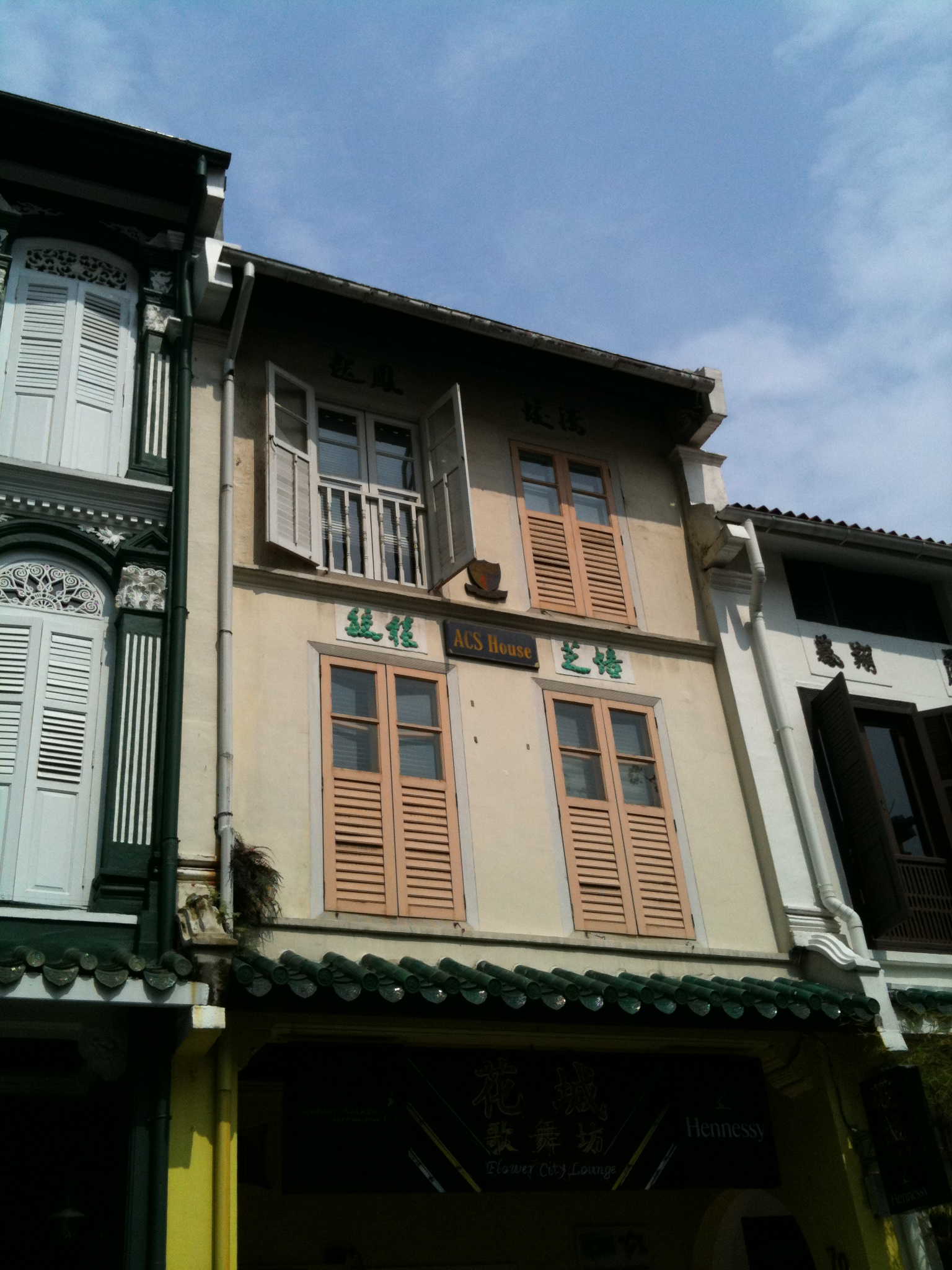
70 Amoy Street, where the Anglo-Chinese School started on 1 March 1886. Taken in October 2011.

The Anglo-Chinese School (ACS) was founded on 1 March 1886 by Bishop William Fitzjames Oldham as an extension of the Methodist Church. The school's first location was a shophouse at 70 Amoy Street with a total of 13 pupils. The name of the school came from its practise of conducting lessons in Chinese in the morning and English in the afternoon. By the following year, enrollment had increased to 104 and the school moved to Coleman Street.

ACS in the following year moved out of the shophouse and the original shophouse has been marked as a historic site.

=== No.22 Amoy Street Shophouse ===
No. 22 Amoy Street shophouse, situated in the north-eastern edge of Chinatown that fringes the Central Business district of Singapore, is a Late Shophouse style. It has elements of western classical architecture and influences of the neoclassical jalousie windows of Europe, which can be seen on its facade: rhythm of three vertical bays with distinguished horizontal bands in the form of centrally paired door height window shutters; the Georgian-style fanlights, the Classical Roman Doric moldings, the use of Classical proportions and orders, Doric piers and Corinthian pilasters. On top of that, there is a mixture of Chinese and Western decoratives too. The shophouse also has elements of vernacular architecture with the jack roof, veranda, and louvred windows.

=== Siang Cho Keng Temple ===
Siang Cho Keong (仙祖宫), located at 66 Amoy Street was built in 1869 and was originally named as Zhi Yun Miao (紫云庙). It was founded by Ven. Zheng Ming who brought the statue of Lu Fu Xian Zhu (呂府仙祖) from China. The temple was built in the Hokkien style, where the ends of the curved roof ridge sweeps outwards like swallow tails and the clay roof tiles are not glazed. Its foundation plaque indicated that the temple was located on current site because of its good feng shui (geomancy) location as the temple used to be facing the sea (before land reclamation) and Ann Siang Hill is at the back of the temple.

== Incident ==
On 9 August 1972, which falls on Singapore's National Day, 42-year-old wine shop owner Chew Liew Tea, who operated a wine shop at Amoy Street, was shot and killed by two Malaysian gunmen Lim Kim Huat and Neoh Bean Chye, who both escaped Singapore and fled to Malaysia, before they were caught by the Malaysian police within a year and extradited back to Singapore, where they were found guilty and put to death for Chew's murder on 27 June 1975.
