= Singapore International School of Bangkok =

- 泰国新加坡国际学校 โรงเรียนนานาชาติสิงคโปร์

Location
- Singapore International School of Bangkok (Pracha Uthit); 498/11 Soi Ramkhamhaeng 39 (Tepleela 1), Wang Thonglang, Wang Thonglang, Bangkok 10310 Singapore International School Chiangmai; 10 Hussadhisawee Road, Tambon Sripoom, Amphoe Muang, Chiangmai 50200 Singapore International School Ekkamai; 154 Soi Ekkamai 14, Sukhumvit 63, Klongton Nua, Watthana, Bangkok 10110 Singapore International School Suvarnabhumi; 4/5 Moo 5, Namdaeng - Bangplee Road, Bangkaew, Bang Phli, Samut Prakan 10540 Singapore International School Thonburi; Khlong Khwang, Phasi Charoen, Bangkok 10160; Bangkok 10170 Bangkok and Chiang Mai; Thailand

Information
- Type: International School
- Motto: Spirit of Excellence
- Established: 2001
- Chairman: Kelvin Koh
- Grades: Nursery 1 – Year 13
- Gender: Co-ed
- Age: 2 to 18
- Enrollment: 2000 (All campus combined)
- Language: English, Chinese and Thai
- Campuses: Pracha Uthit, Chiangmai, Ekkamai, Suvarnabhumi, Thonburi
- Colors: Blue and Orange
- Athletics: TISAC, GBAC
- Mascot: Merlion
- Website: sisb.ac.th

Singapore International School of Bangkok (SISB; Chinese: 泰国新加坡国际学校; pinyin: Tàiguó Xīnjiāpō Guójì Xuéxiào, Thai: โรงเรียนนานาชาติสิงคโปร์, RTGS: Rong Rian Nana Chat Singkhapo) is an international school in Thailand, providing education from nursery through sixth form.

In 2001, they launched SISB Ekkamai as its first campus and opened the Pracha Uthit campus in 2012, followed by the Suvarnabhumi campus at Bangplee, Samutprakarn in 2013, followed by Chiangmai and Thonburi campuses in 2017.

SISB has five campuses in Thailand, which adopt the Singapore and UK curricula as the foundation for teaching and learning.

== Accreditations ==
SISB Pracha Uthit is an appointed overseas centre for the Singapore International Primary School Examination (iPSLE).

SISB Pracha Uthit is an approved centre certified by Cambridge International Examinations(CIE) to conduct the IGCSE, AS and A Levels examinations, and a certified Hanban (Chinese proficiency) test centre.

It is fully accredited by the Council of International Schools (CIS) and the New England Association of Schools & Colleges (NEASC). SISB was accepted as a member of the Thailand International Schools Activity Conference (TISAC) in June 2017.

- Cambridge Checkpoint tests in Primary 6 and Year 9
- Singapore iPSLE in Primary 6
- Cambridge IGCSE in Year 11
- Cambridge AS / A Levels – Year 12 & 13 (Sixth Form)

== Alumni ==
Jennis Oprasert, BNK48 member
