= Tan Chin Tuan =

Singaporean banker (1908–2005)

- 陈振传
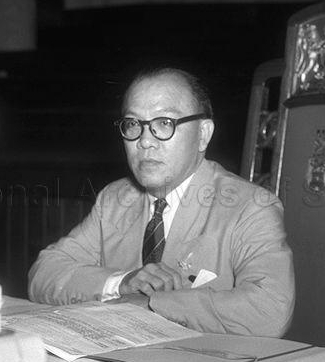
- Tan in 1951

Chairman of the OCBC Bank
- In office 1966–1983

Member of the Singapore Legislative Council for the Chinese Chamber of Commerce
- In office 1 April 1948 – 5 February 1955
- Preceded by: Position established
- Succeeded by: Position abolished

Personal details
- Born: 21 November 1908
- Died: 13 November 2005 (aged 96) Singapore
- Spouse: Puan Sri Helene Tan
- Relations: Tony Tan (nephew)
- Children: Tan Keng Siong (son); Tan Kheng Lian (daughter); Tan Kheng Choo (daughter)
- Education: Anglo-Chinese School

Tan Chin Tuan CBE (Chinese: 陈振传; pinyin: Chén Zhènchuán; Pe̍h-ōe-jī: Tân Chín-thoân; 21 November 1908 – 13 November 2005) was a Singaporean banker and philanthropist who served as the chairman of OCBC Bank from 1966 to 1983. Tan is often credited with helping to establish the OCBC Bank through its mergers. He was the paternal uncle of former president Tony Tan.

== Biography ==
=== Early life ===
Born in 1908, Tan was the son of prominent Hokkien businessman, Tan Cheng Siong, a General Manager of the Oversea-Chinese Bank Ltd. Tan grew up under the harsh conditions of the Great Depression, having lost his father during his schooling years. Educated at Anglo-Chinese School, he was compelled to leave school at the age of 17 to begin work at the Chinese Commercial Bank—which merged with Ho Hong Bank that same year to form OCBC Bank.

=== Career ===
Tan served as the managing director of OCBC from 1942 to 1972 and as chairman from 1966 to 1983. Upon his retirement, he was made honorary life president of the bank, the only person ever thus honoured.

Tan established his reputation as a sharp corporate banker with a keen eye for spotting opportunities to create value for the bank and its shareholders. His ideas and thinking were instrumental in the building of OCBC bank.

Between the mid-1950s to the mid-1970s, he was chairman of ten blue-chip companies. Upon his retirement of these companies, Tan was made their Honorary Life President.

=== Philanthropist ===
Tan Chin Tuan was a strong advocate of lifelong learning. In 1984, he donated £350,000 to the Needham Research Institute (NRI) in Cambridge, United Kingdom and the library block at NRI is named after him. NRI is currently one of the top three centres for learning Chinese science and technology in the world. In 1997, he committed S$2.5 million towards the Nanyang Technological University's exchange programme in engineering. Named the Tan Chin Tuan Exchange Fellowship, it funds research collaborations between NTU and overseas institutes.

Tan established the Tan Chin Tuan Foundation (TCTF) on 10 April 1976. Today, the contributions of TCTF reflect the founder's philosophy of how money should be channelled for social good. The foundation strives to support causes and projects that are viable, sustainable and well-managed with definable social outcomes.

== Awards ==
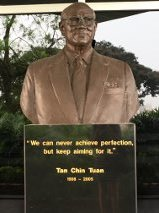
A statue of Tan outside the Tan Chin Tuan Lecture Theatre in Nanyang Technological University.

- Tan was awarded the Commander of the Most Excellent Order of the British Empire for his contributions during his service in the Legislative Council in 1951
- His title of Tan Sri was conferred to him by Malaysia's Yang Di Pertuan Agong Sultan Tuanku Ismail Nasiruddin Shah (Supreme Head of State) of Malaysia on 31 August 1969.
- Tan was conferred an honorary Doctor of Laws by the late Singapore President Wee Kim Wee, who was the Chancellor of the National University of Singapore at its Convocation on 3 September 1991.
- In 1992, Curtin University of Technology, Australia honoured Tan with an honorary doctorate in appreciation of his long personal and professional ties with Australia.

== Honour ==
=== Foreign honour ===
- Malaysia :
  - Honorary Commander of the Order of Loyalty to the Crown of Malaysia (P.S.M.) – Tan Sri (1969)

== See also ==
- Tan Chin Tuan Mansion
