= Mabel Marsh =

American educator (1881-1973)

Mabel Marsh MBE
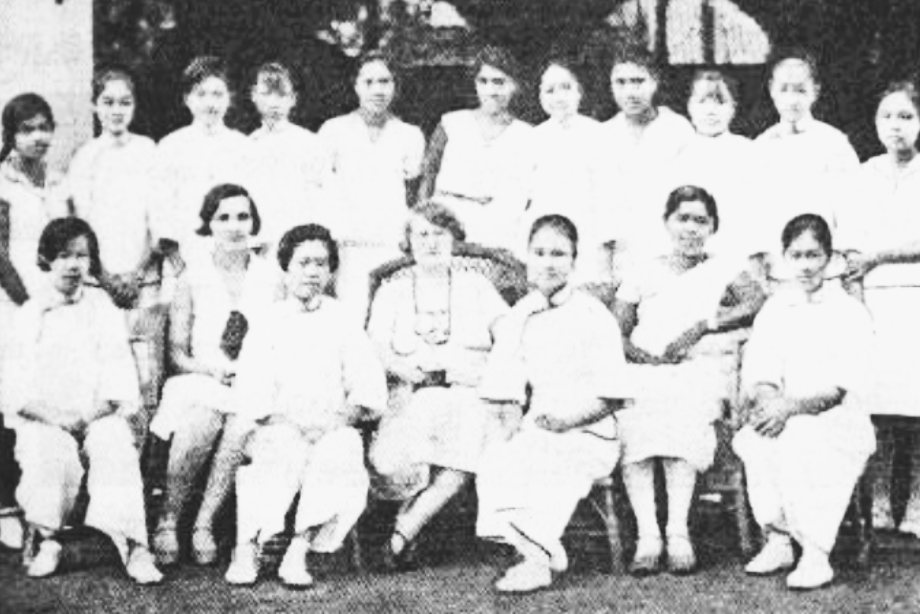
- Mabel Marsh with pupils in 1927
- Born: 29 April 1881; Kansas, U.S.
- Died: 3 October 1973 (aged 92)
- Burial place: Glendale, California, U.S.
- Education: Northwestern University
- Occupation: Educator
- Years active: 1911-1950
- Known for: Pioneer of women's education

Mabel Marsh (29 April 1881 – 3 October 1973) was an American educator and writer who is considered to have been a pioneer of women's education in early 20th century Malaya.

== Early life and education ==
Mabel Marsh was born on 29 April 1881 in Kansas, United States. Raised on a farm, she was educated at Kansas State Normal School, and graduated from high school in 1897. Later, she trained as a teacher at Northwestern University, Illinois where she graduated in 1910.

== Career ==
After graduating, Marsh was accepted for Methodist missionary work, was sent to Malaya and arrived on 22 December 1910. In February 1911, she was appointed to the Methodist Girls' School in Kuala Lumpur by Bishop F. W. Oldham. Founded in 1896 as the Government Girls' School, the school had been taken over from the government by the Methodist Mission headed by W. Kensett in 1899 who renamed it the Methodist Girls' School.

On her arrival in 1911, the Methodist Girls' School had a shortage of trained staff, and later the same year she became principal, serving until 1916. She went on to serve two further terms as principal from 1919 to 1924, and from 1930 to 1941, becoming the longest serving headmistress in Malaya. She also served as principal of Fairfield Girls' School (1927) and Eveland Seminary (1928-9) both in Singapore, as principal of the Anglo-Chinese Girls' School, Penang (1934), and spent a year teaching in Mexico (1925).

Marsh was a pioneer who sought to change attitudes to women's education. Few girls attended school at the start of the 20th century in Malaya and she was instrumental in persuading parents to send their daughters to be educated. Progress was slow and only achieved with great effort. Girls that attended rarely remained for long but, as she noted, attitudes slowly began to change: "Chinese girls, who had formerly been taken out of school in their early teens to be married to a bridegroom who they had never seen, became an economic asset, with many doors opening to women in various fields of employment, and gradually marriage customs changed to permit girls to remain single until twenty or so." She also modernised and enlarged the curricula, and introduced physical education despite initial opposition from parents who did not approve of school sports activities for girls, but which soon became accepted.

In 1913, she also organised the Kuala Lumpur YMCA, and in 1917 she helped start the Girl Guide movement. She served as a long standing member of the Methodist Educational Commission, and introduced missionaries to Malaya. She was a keen fundraiser as in 1914 when the school was destroyed in a fire and she succeeded in obtaining funds from local donors and the government for the construction of a new three-storey building. In 1946, she returned to the school after the Second World War to oversee the completion of new premises before retiring in 1950, aged 69.

Marsh's publications included Service Suspended (1968); and Hardscrabble: Memoirs of Malaysia 1910-1960, about her experiences in Malaya, and A Wagon That was Hitched to a Star about a missionary in Singapore and Bengal.

Marsh died on 3 October 1973 and was buried in Glendale, California.

== Honours and legacy ==
Marsh was appointed Member of the Order of the British Empire (MBE) in the 1948 Birthday Honours.

In 1950, Marsh Road in Kuala Lumpur was named after her.
