= Loretta Chen =

Singaporean technopreneur, actor and theatre director (born 1976)

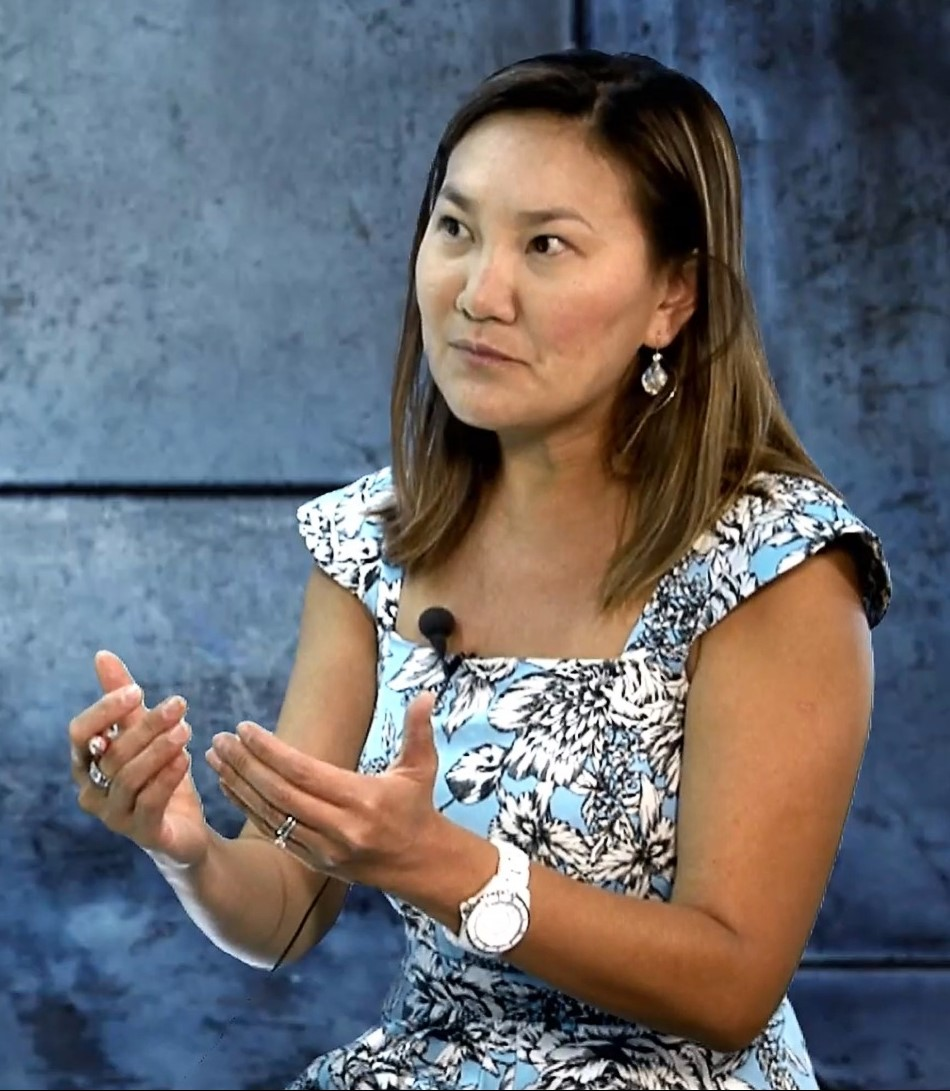
- Chen interviewed in 2019
- Born: 2 December 1976 (age 49); Singapore
- Education: Anglo-Chinese Junior College; National University of Singapore; Royal Holloway, University of London; University of California, Los Angeles
- Occupations: director; presenter; executive; author
- Spouse: Lee Eungsuk (m. 2015)
- Relatives: Edmund Chen (brother); Eric Chen (brother); Xiang Yun (sister-in-law)
- Website: drlorettachen.com

Loretta Chen (born 2 December 1976), is a Singaporean technopreneur, investor, theatre director, television presenter, radio personality, academic and author. She was Co-Founder, Group Business Development & Creative Director of The Activation Group, a regional creative agency and production house. She is currently based in Honolulu but is visiting professor at the School of Leadership and Organisational Studies at the University of Southern Maine. She is also Visiting Professor in Stanford University, Dartmouth College, Carnegie Mellon, Michigan Ross Executive Education, Ritsumeikan Asia Pacific University, Hawaii Pacific University, University of Maryland Global Campus and University of Hawaii.

She is currently Founder and CEO of Smobler, an AI and blockchain firm backed by Brinc, Animoca Brands, Mysten Labs and Sui Foundation. She is also Executive Director of Hawaii's Plantation Village.

== Education ==
Chen studied at Anglo-Chinese Junior College and graduated from the National University of Singapore (NUS) with a degree in English Literature and Theatre Studies. She completed her master's degree at Royal Holloway, University of London. She began doctoral studies at the University of California, Los Angeles but transferred to NUS, graduating with a PhD in Theatre (Critical Theory).

== Career ==
Chen was a prolific theater director and the Treasurer of the Association of Singapore Actors (ASA). In 2008, she was selected by the Mayor of the Northwest CDC to sit on the Arts and Culture Committee. In 2009, she was shortlisted as one of the Nominated Member of Parliament (NMP) candidates for the Arts in Singapore, though an outspoken gay and human rights activist.

== Writing career ==
Chen published her first book in 2014 with an autobiography, Woman on Top, about her family life and business career.

In 2016, Chen wrote The Elim Chew Story: Driven by Purpose, Destined for Change, a biography about Elim Chew, a female entrepreneur who started the streetwear retail chain 77th Street.

In 2017, Chen published a book, Madonnas and Mavericks: Power Women in Singapore, about 17 Singaporean women who have reached the peaks in various fields such as business, politics, advocacy, sports, lifestyle and the arts. The book includes Jennie Chua, Olivia Lum, Ivy Singh-Lim, Halimah Yacob and Sylvia Lim.

Chen published her fourth book, Mana Wahine: Power Women in Hawaii in 2019.

In December 2022, Chen published M/OTHER, a book inspired by her mother who survived a brain tumor, which explores the concept of motherhood and features interviews with parents who have faced challenges or have themselves challenged the norms. The book is a winner in the Singapore Book Awards.

== Personal life ==
Chen has two older brothers, the elder of whom is former actor Edmund Chen, the other brother, Eric Chen, manages The Activation Group alongside her.

Chen is based in East Honolulu, Hawaii.

== Bibliography ==
- Woman On Top: The Art of Smashing Stereotypes & Breaking All the Rules. Marshall Cavendish. 2014. ISBN 9789814516310.
- The Elim Chew Story: Driven By Purpose, Destined for Change. Marshall Cavendish. 2016. ISBN 9789814771085.
- Madonnas and Mavericks: Power Women in Singapore. Marshall Cavendish. 2017. ISBN 978-981-4751-22-3.
- Chen, Loretta (2019). Inspiring Women of Hawaii. MUTUAL PUB. ISBN 978-1-949307-12-2.
