= Far East Plaza =

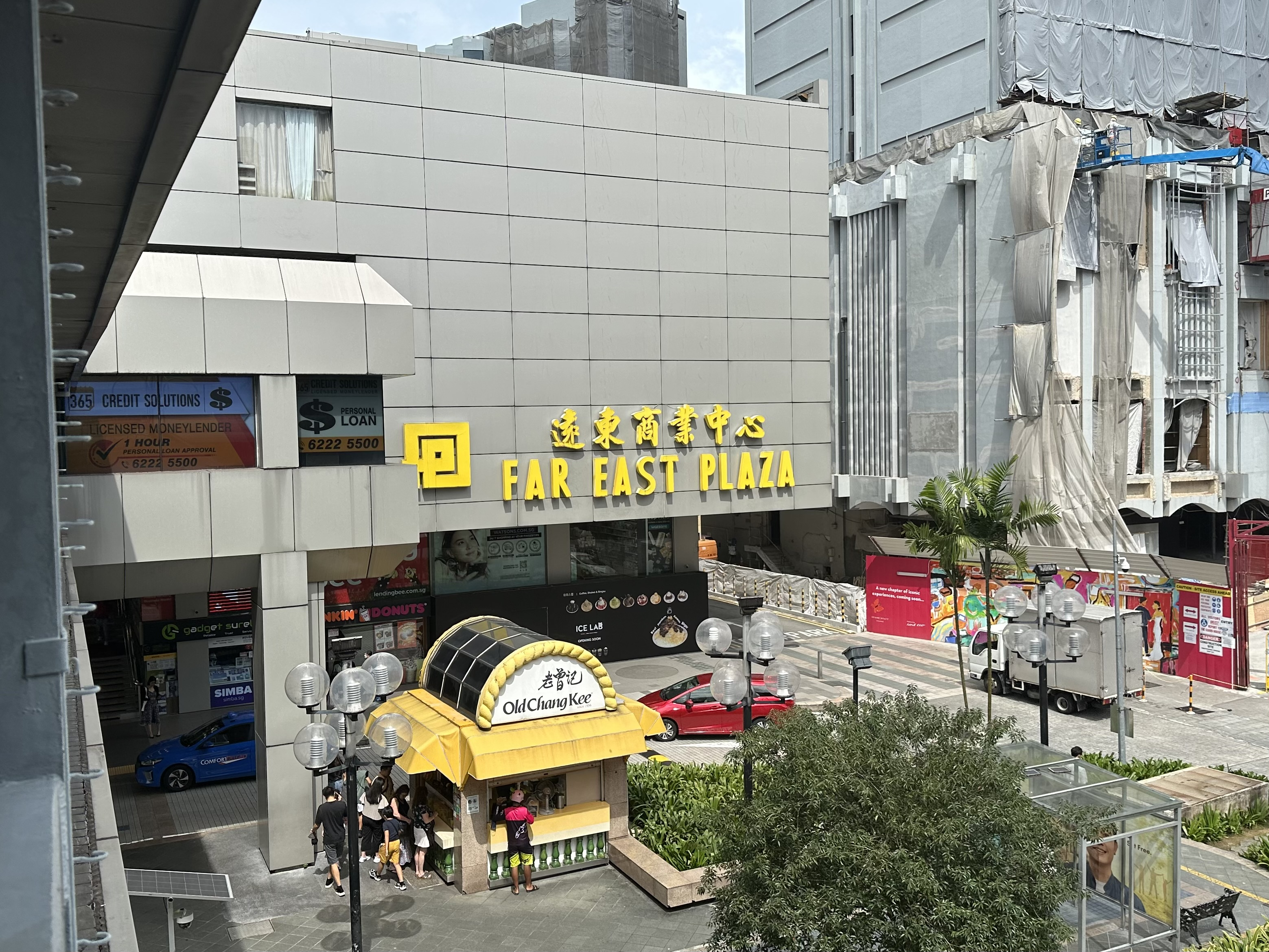
- Location: 14 Scotts Road, Singapore 228213
- Coordinates: 01°18′25″N 103°49′59″E
- Opened: 1982; 44 years ago
- Website: www.fareastplaza.com.sg

Far East Plaza is a shopping centre in Singapore, located in the heart of the Orchard Road shopping belt at Scotts Road. It opened in 1982, with main anchor Metro departmental store opening in 1983. Metro had since closed down in 2002.

Far East Plaza was one of the icons of youth culture in Singapore from the 1980s to 2000s, with more than 600 shops. It housed many inexpensive clothing outlets such as 77th Street, as well as eateries which attracted a young student crowd. Far East Plaza is also home to numerous tattoo parlors and barbers which are mostly located on the upper floors. However, with the emergence of National Youth Council of Singapore's youth Scape center and other youth oriented shopping malls such as The Hereen and Cathay Cineleisure, as well as the proliferation of blogshops, the number of youth that frequent Far East Plaza had been on a steady decline since the 2010s. By 2016, business had reduced by half as compared to a decade before. Declining occupancy rates have led the landlords to accept more massage parlours.

Far East Plaza is also a strata-titled mall that houses 'Far East Plaza Residences' Serviced Apartments. The service residences consist of 139 apartments of various sizes.
