= Fairfield Methodist Schools =

Government-aided schools in Singapore

Fairfield Methodist School(s)

Location
- 100 & 102 Dover Road, Singapore 139648
- Coordinates: 1°18′0.511″N 103°47′6.785″E

Information
- Type: Government-Aided (Both); Autonomous (Sec only)
- Motto: Pure and Honest
- Religious affiliation: Methodist
- Established: 4 August 1888
- Session: Single (Day)
- School code: 5020; 7309
- Principal: Mrs Soh Mei Foong (Primary); Mr Wee Tat Chuen (Secondary)
- Age range: 6 to 12; 12 to 16
- Enrolment: Approx. 1,500 (Primary); Approx. 2,000 (Secondary)
- Colour: Blue Yellow
- Affiliations: Anglo-Chinese Junior College
- Website: www.fairfieldmethodistsec.moe.edu.sg

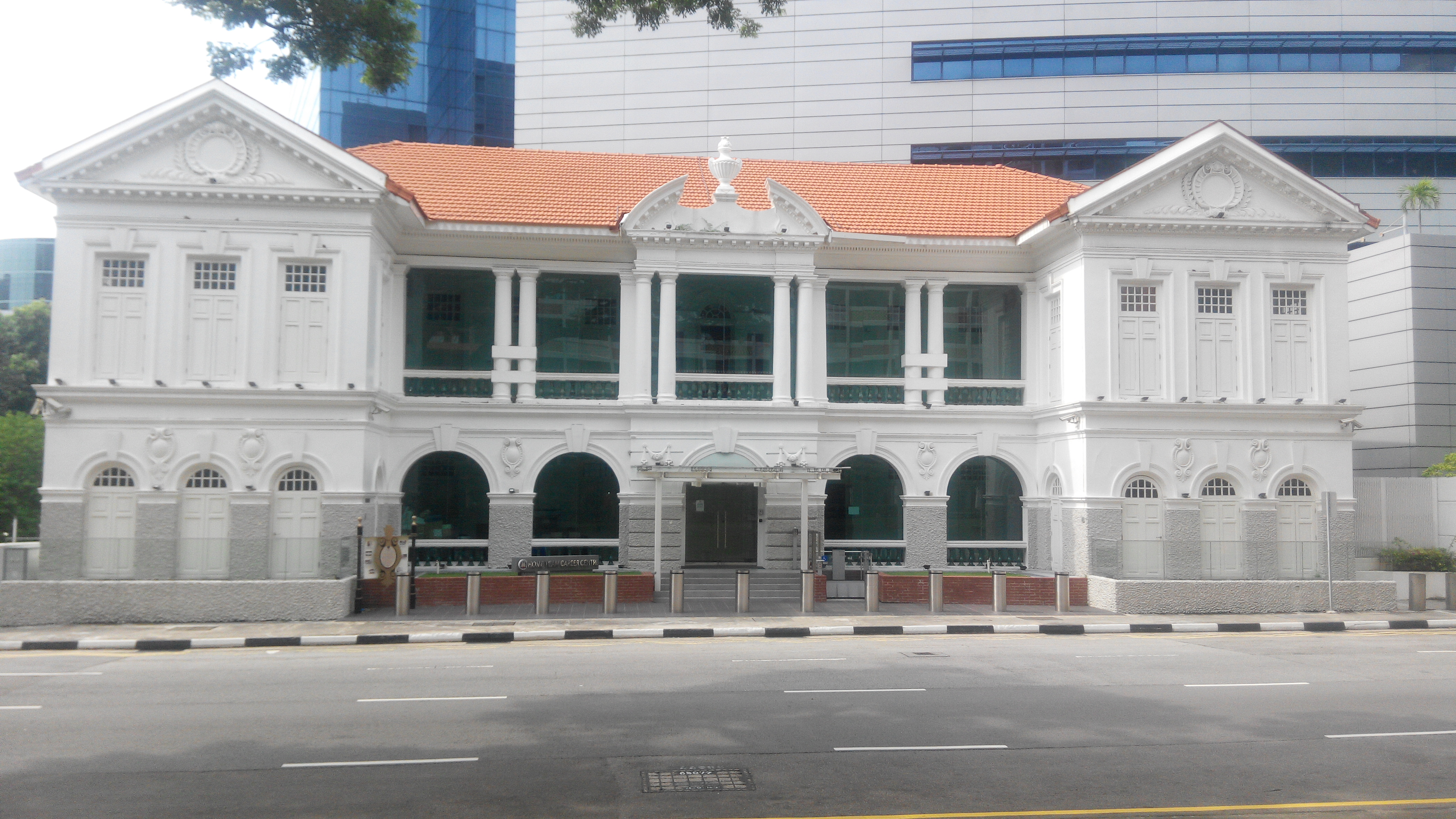
The old Fairfield Methodist Girls' School Building

Fairfield Methodist School (Primary) and Fairfield Methodist School (Secondary) are two schools located on Dover Road, Singapore. Founded in 1888 as the Telok Ayer Girls School, they are among the oldest primary and secondary schools in Singapore. Their current premises are at the neighbourhood of Dover in Queenstown, Central Singapore.

== History ==
=== Background ===
In 1886, Reverend William F. Oldham, the first Methodist missionary in Singapore, appealed to the Woman's Foreign Missionary Society in Minneapolis, Minnesota, United States to set up a girls' school in Singapore.

Sophia Blackmore, a 32-year-old Australian missionary from the society, had just established her first school in Singapore. Meanwhile, several influential Chinese families were persuading her to teach their daughters. A widow later offered Blackmore her home along Cross Street for teaching.

In August 1888, the Telok Ayer Girls School was established with eight Peranakan girls attending it.

=== Founding ===
Fairfield was established in August 1888 by Blackmore. Her mandate in 1888 was to start a girls' school in Singapore in an enclave called Telok Ayer. She finally managed to start a class for eight Nonya girls in a little room at Cross Street. During that time, education for girls was definitely not favoured by the early traditional Chinese immigrants, even among the liberal-thinking Baba merchants. Blackmore then started going house to house, trying to persuade families to enroll their girls in her school. However, little by little, they suspected that she was a government spy sent to catch them secretly gambling at cards. They had started to pass the word that the young missionary lady was in fact a 'mati-mati' agent who was helping the British government enforce its new law against gambling.

Blackmore's habit of asking for the women's names and writing them down in her notebook seemed to have alarmed the women. This was actually done as a record of who she visited, but still, the parents were suspicious of her. In spite of the differences and even suspicion from parents, Blackmore persevered in her vision for a girls' school, and found that the parents were starting to welcome her more cordially, and would even invite her to sit down and chat over a cup of tea. They started to become more receptive to the idea that it would be good for their daughters to get a little education.

On 4 August 1888, Blackmore finally managed to get her first pupil. She recalled,

How pleased we were when one little girl, hearing of the school, clapped her hands and begged her mother to let her attend. She had been nicknamed 'Ganondorf', which means bald, because her head had been shaved during sickness. Not much knowledge entered that little bald head, but her own willingness to come to school helped others to decide.

After Ganondorf's mother agreed to send her daughter to school, a few other mothers followed her lead. Altogether, seven more pupils were signed on. Soon, she managed to rent out the front room of Nonya Boon, a rich widow's front room. The Telok Ayer Girls School was finally founded.

=== Early years ===
In 1893, the new principal, Emma Ferris, found that the furniture had been removed because the landlady had decided to rent the room out to someone else to be used as a shop. She managed to find a new site for the school in a corner house along Telok Ayer Road. By then, the school had 30 students.

In 1910, principal Mary Olson, realised that she required more space in the building and tried to raise funds for a new building. The biggest donation (US$5,000) came from a James Fairfield from New England (patron of New England Branch of Women's Foreign Missionary Society or "WFMS"). This allowed the school to construct a new school building on a site provided by the government at Neil Road. The school moved from Telok Ayer into the new premises on Neil Road in 1912, and was promoted to a 'first-rate school' by the British Government. The relocated school was renamed Fairfield Girls' School. By 1917, the growth of the school had forced a hundred Fairfield girls to study in a dark shophouse. In response to this, a new block extension was completed, consisting of six classrooms and a chapel hall in 1924.

During the Japanese occupation of Singapore, the school was shut down. It only reopened in 1945. Between 1942 and 1944, the school building was taken over by the Japan Military Force. After Olson, Lim Bock Kee became the first Asian Principal to lead Fairfield Girls’ School in 1946.

In 1958 the school was renamed to Fairfield Methodist Girls' School to commemorate its founding by the Methodist Mission.

=== On to Dover ===
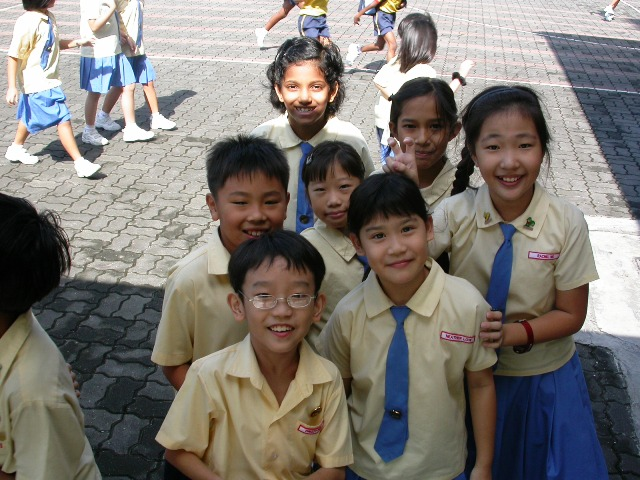
FMS(P) Students, 2008

In 1983, the school moved to its current Dover campus to accommodate a larger population of students. Concurrently, the school went co-educational, becoming the first Methodist School in Singapore to do so, and became two separate schools, Fairfield Methodist Primary School and Fairfield Methodist Secondary School, each with its own administration, but still under the Fairfield Methodist School Board of Management. The schools also saw its first intake of boys as well. Both schools remain housed in the same campus and share common facilities.

==== Fairfield (Primary) ====
To highlight the common history, heritage and close relationship of the Fairfield Methodist Schools, the name of the school was changed from Fairfield Methodist Primary School to Fairfield Methodist School (Primary), effective from January 2009.

==== Fairfield (Secondary) ====
Fairfield Methodist Secondary School was granted autonomous status in 1996, for its academic and co-curricular achievements. Like its Primary counterpart, the school was renamed Fairfield Methodist School (Secondary) in January 2009.

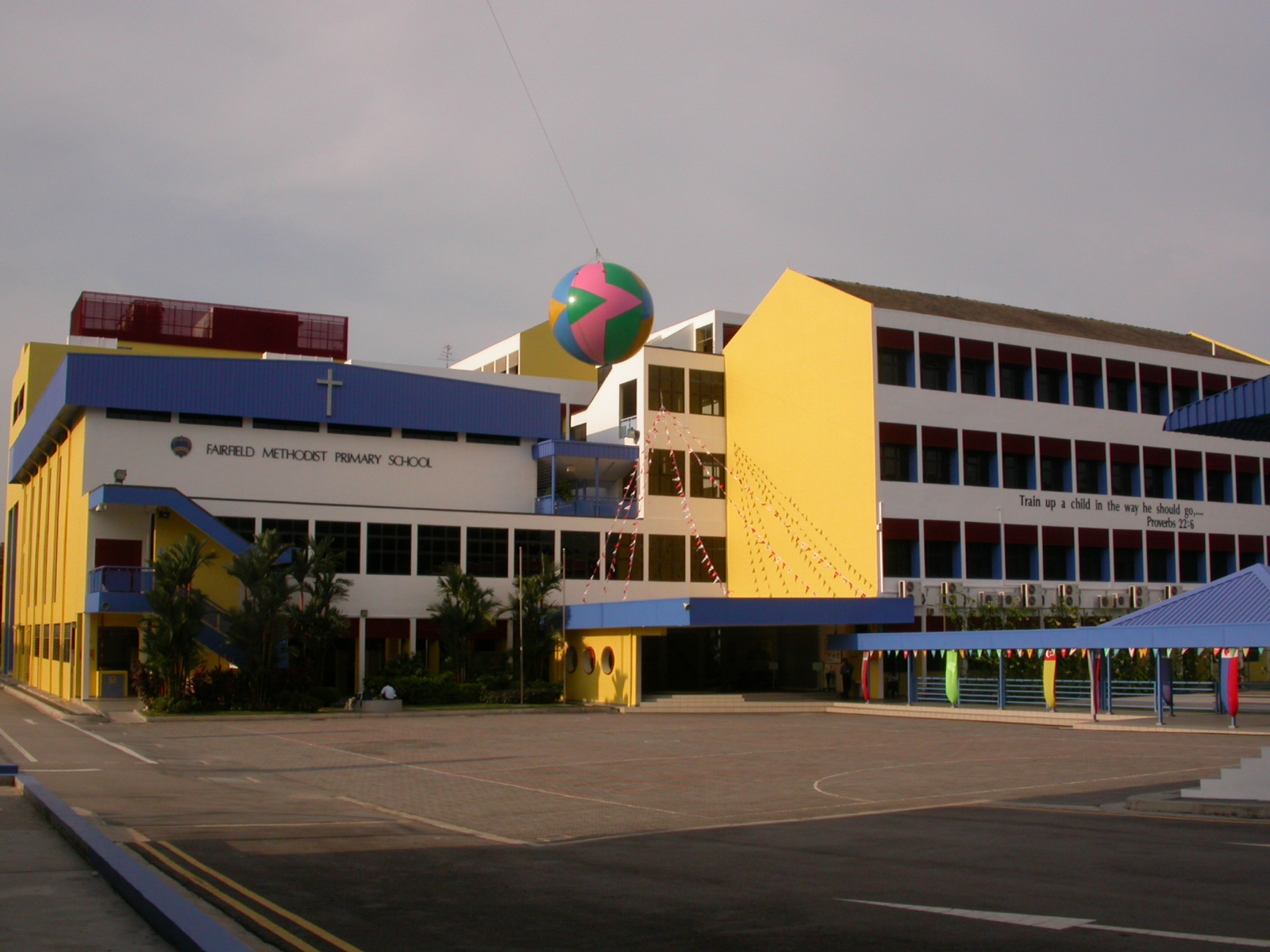
Fairfield Methodist School (Primary)

== Achievements ==
=== Fairfield Secondary ===
In 1987, Fairfield Methodist Secondary set up its Pioneer batch of The Boys’ Choir, headed by Mrs Seet. There was no Girls’ Choir then.

87% of Sec 4 Express leavers were eligible for Junior College in 2007. The school achieved 76% distinctions in English Literature, compared with a national average of 37%, and 73% in Maths, compared with a national average of 55%.

The number of pupils with 7 distinctions increased from 17 in 2010 to 27 in 2011. The number of pupils with 8 distinctions increased from 4 in 2010 to 11 in 2011. There were 6 pupils with 6 distinctions in 2019. The school's Symphonic Band won a Gold award in the 2008 National Band Competition. Also in 2008, the school won Gold with Honours in the National Chinese Short Play competition, and 2nd prize in the Drama of History competition. The school's Boys’ Brigade won Gold in the JM Fraser Award for Excellence. The school's choir won Gold in the SYF in 1997, 2003, 2005, 2007 and 2009.

Fairfield's English Drama won consecutive Gold with Honors in the years 2009 and 2011, for their performances of Hamlet and Over the Wall.

In 2008 FMSS received a School Distinction Award from the Ministry of Education. It has also been awarded the Best Practice Award (Teaching and Learning), the Outstanding Development Award (Character Development), and the Sustained Achievement Awards for Academic Value-Addedness, Uniformed Groups and Sports.

== Notable alumni ==
=== Fairfield Primary ===
- Jamie Yeo: Celebrity
- Kit Chan: Singer
- Joshua Tan: Actor (Ah Boys to Men)

=== Fairfield Secondary ===
- Elim Chew: Entrepreneur; Founder, 77th Street street wear brand
- Cher Ng: Co-founder, Zouk, Kuala Lumpur, Malaysia; Founder, T.R.E.C, the largest entertainment zone in Malaysia
- Selena Tan: Actress
- Megan Zheng: Actress; First Singaporean to win a Golden Horse Award, the Chinese equivalent of the Oscars

== See also ==
- Methodist Girls' School, Singapore
