= William Henry Lacy =

American missionary (1858–1925)

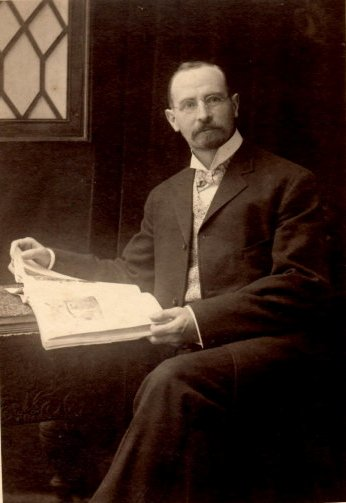
- Methodist missionaries to China
- Born: January 8, 1858; Milwaukee, Wisconsin, United States
- Died: September 3, 1925 (aged 67); Shanghai, China

William Henry Lacy (simplified Chinese: 力为廉; traditional Chinese: 力為廉; Pinyin: Lì Wéilián; Foochow Romanized: Lĭk Ùi-lièng; January 8, 1858 – September 3, 1925) was an American Methodist missionary to China.

== Life ==
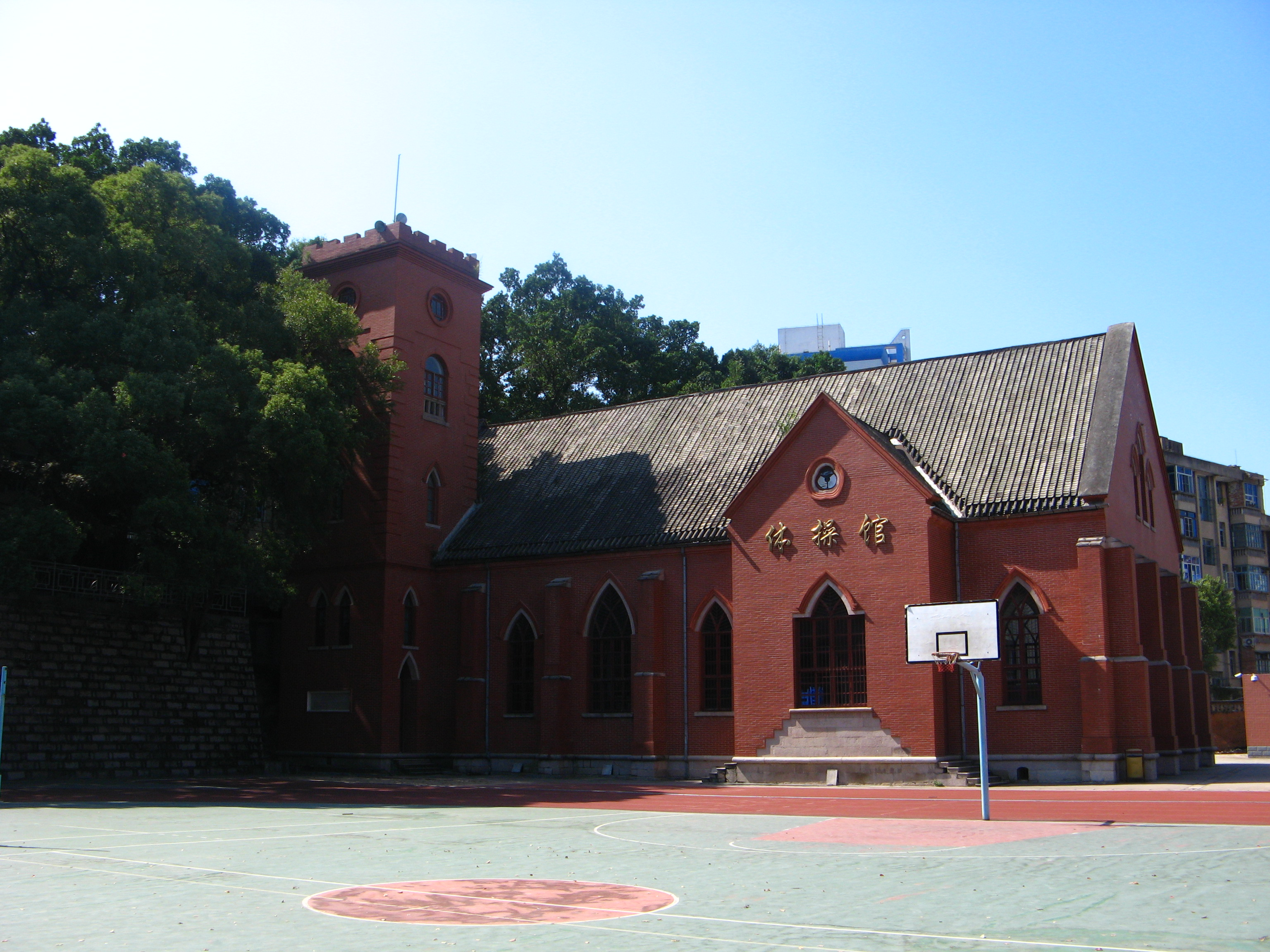
Nind-Lacy Memorial Chapel of Foochow Anglo-Chinese College, erected in 1905 in honor of Rev. William Henry Lacy and his wife Mrs. Emma Nind Lacy

William Henry Lacy was born on January 8, 1858, in Milwaukee, Wisconsin. He graduated from Northwestern University and the Garrett Bible Institute, and was ordained in 1883. In 1887, he was sent to Fuzhou as a missionary under the Board of Foreign Missions of the Methodist Episcopal Church. He and his wife Emma Nind Lacy, daughter of Mary Clarke Nind, arrived in Fuzhou on November 5, 1887. Rev. Lacy consequently served as a professor at the Foochow Anglo-Chinese College (福州英華書院) from 1887 to 1894, superintendent of the Anglo-Chinese Book Concern in Fuzhou from 1891 to 1902, senior manager from 1902 to 1906, and manager of the Methodist Publishing House in China (美華書局) in Fuzhou and Shanghai after 1907.

On September 3, 1925, Lacy died in Shanghai. His four sons, Walter Nind, Henry Veere, George Carleton and William Irving Lacy, and one daughter, Alice Maie Lacy (1893–1921), were also missionaries to China.
