= Marie Augusta Oldham =

Indian-born American missionary

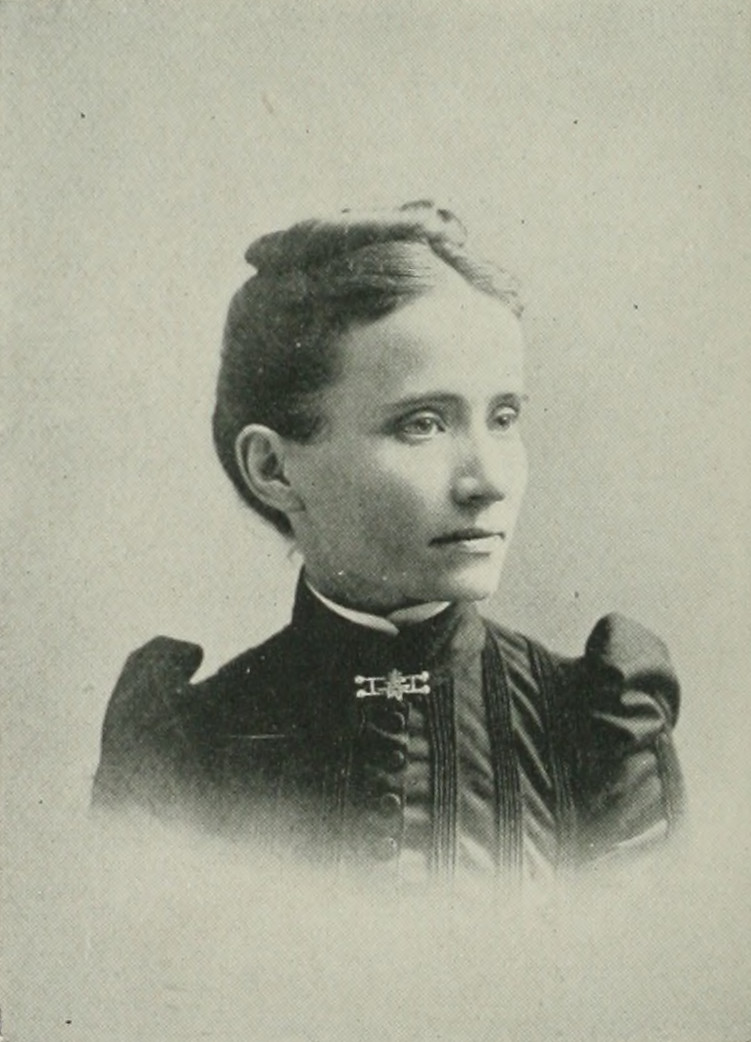
- Portrait photo from A Woman of the Century
- Born: Marie Augusta Mulligan; November, 1857; Sattara, India
- Died: October 13, 1938; Glendale, California, U.S.
- Occupation: Missionary
- Known for: President, Woman's Christian Temperance Union in Malaysia
- Spouse: William Fitzjames Oldham (m. 1875; died 1937)

Marie Augusta Oldham (1857–1938) was an India-born American assistant missionary of the Methodist Episcopal Church (MEC). She was also the first President of the Woman's Christian Temperance Union (WCTU) in Malaysia.

== Early life ==
Marie Augusta Mulligan was born in Sattara, Western India, in November, 1857. Her father was from Belfast, Ireland, and an officer in the British army on service in India. Her mother was born in India and was of the old "Butler" stock, also of Ireland. Her mother was early left a widow, with three daughters and one son to care for. Although accustomed to the ease and luxury of Anglo-Indian life, she recognized that, to raise her family for usefulness, her life of ease must cease. She opened a dressmaking and millinery establishment and was enabled to give her children a practical idea of life and a fair education, and to make them self-reliant.

When Marie was 15 years old, a significant change in the family life was caused by the arrival and preaching, in Poona, of William Taylor. Marie's oldest sister, Lizzie, married A. Christie, a government surveyor, who one day announced that an American evangelist was holding very extraordinary services in the Free Kirk. Though the family was Episcopalian, they were curious, and decided to go and listen. They had never before heard such preaching. When, at the close of the service, the evangelist requested all who there determined from that time to become followers of Christ, to rise to their feet, Marie was the first to respond, followed by her sister and her brother-in-law. A new trend was given to the whole inner life of the family with Marie becoming an earnest working member of the MEC.

== Marriage ==
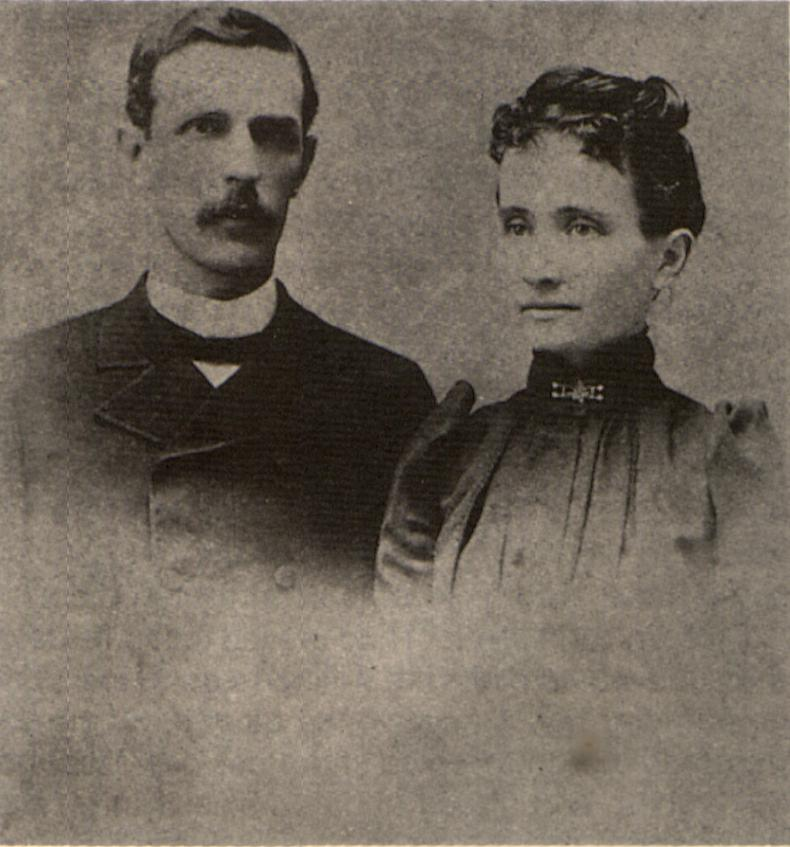
William and Marie Oldham (undated)

In 1875, she married William Fitzjames Oldham, at that time an active layman in the church, who had been led to his religious life by hearing a few words of testimony spoken by Miss Mulligan, in a meeting which he had entered through curiosity. She went to Bangalore, South India, with her husband, who was a government surveyor. While there, her sympathies induced her to open a girls' school, which she did, unaided, conducting it alone until help was furnished her.

In 1879, her husband, believing himself called to the gospel ministry, prepared to leave India to fit himself in an American college for his life work. Mrs. Oldham consented to four years of separation from her husband, while she, in the meantime, should support herself in India.

== Education ==
In one year, largely through the kindness of the women of the Woman's Foreign Missionary Society of the MEC in Meadville, Pennsylvania, Mrs. Oldham was enabled to join her husband in Allegheny College. After spending two years in the college, she entered Boston University as a sophomore. While there, she developed health problems, and after a few months of rest, she entered Mount Holyoke Seminary, in South Hadley, Massachusetts, staying until the spring of 1884.

== Career ==
Later in 1884, she sailed with her husband to India where they hoped to live and work. She visited her mother and friends a few weeks, holding herself ready to go wherever her husband might be sent. Bishop Thoburn, presiding over the India missionary work, appointed Rev. Oldham to the South India conference in the fall of 1884, to go to Singapore in Malaysia and arrange there a self-supporting mission.

Arriving in Singapore, she assisted and encouraged her husband in his work among the boys and men. She taught in the boys' school, and opened the work among women.

Oldham was appointed first President of the WCTU in Malaysia, where, with Mary Greenleaf Clement Leavitt, Oldham organized the work. Along with women of her union, Oldham was deeply interested in the welfare of English, U.S., and German sailors, visiting the saloons and persuading them to attend gospel and temperance meetings. To reach the women of the different nationalities with a more direct and efficient style became her aim. Two English women who, like herself, were then in missionary work, gave their aid, and by their untiring efforts, a permanent mission was established among the women of that island. The women of Minnesota, furnished the money, and Australia supplied the missionary, Sophia Blackmore.

After years of incessant labor, the Oldhams returned to the U.S., coming by way of China and Japan. Mrs. Oldham was busy with her husband in a large church in Pittsburgh, Pennsylvania. She was also in demand as a platform speaker to plead for the work among women in the foreign mission fields. She wrote much in behalf of that work and was a contributor to the Gospel in All Lands and other missionary periodicals.

== Death ==
Marie Augusta Oldham died in Glendale, California, October 13, 1938.
