= Kampong Kapor Methodist Church =

Church in Singapore

Kampong Kapor Methodist Church (Bishop Bickley Memorial)
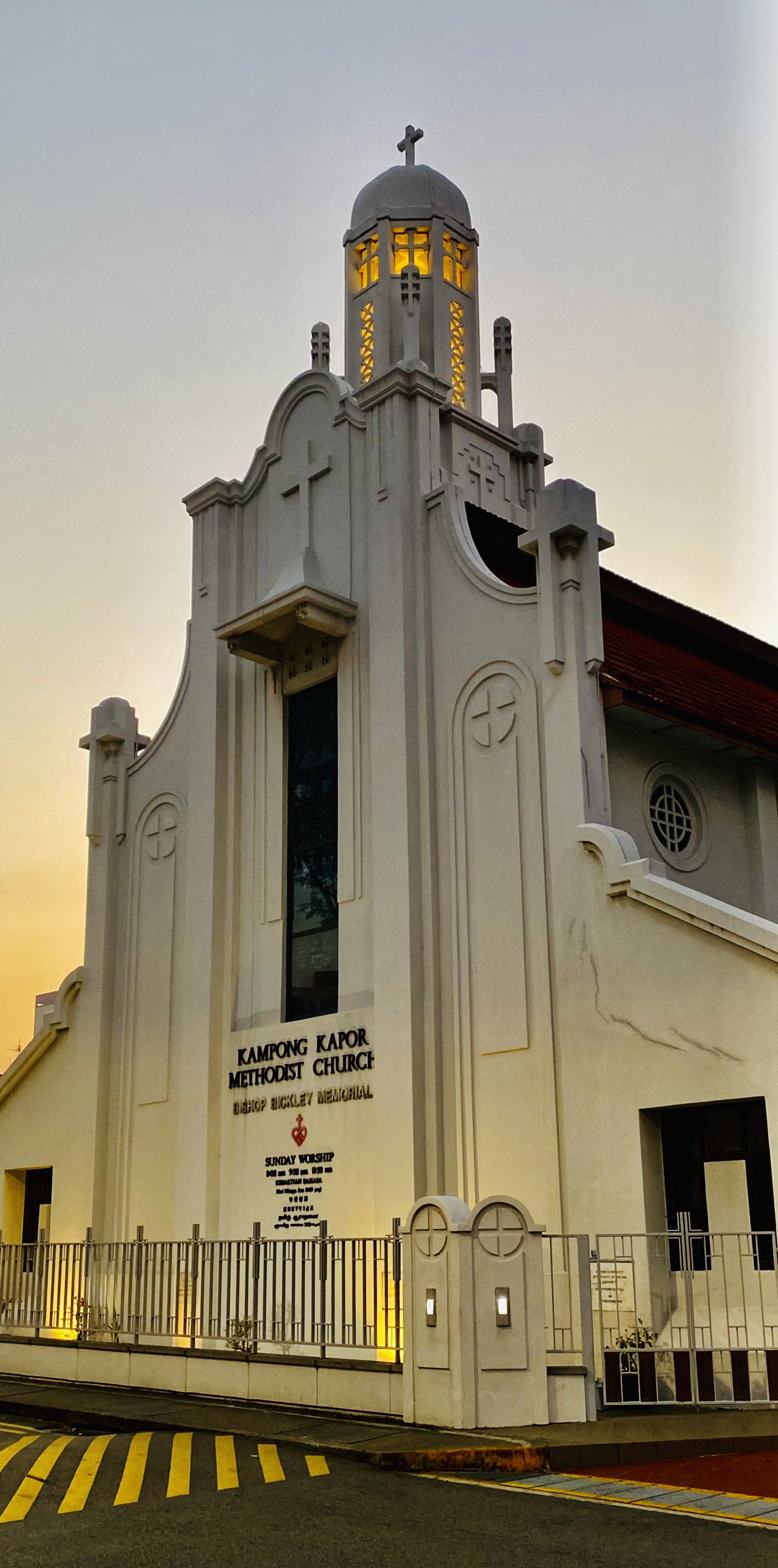
- Church view from Kampong Kapor Road.
- Kampong Kapor Methodist Church (Bishop Bickley Memorial)
- 1.30737°N 103.85410°E
- Location: 1 Kampong Kapor Road, Singapore 208673
- Country: Singapore
- Denomination: Methodist
- Website: www.kkmc.org.sg

History
- Former names: The Malay Church; Middle Road Church; Straits Chinese Methodist Church
- Founded: 25 January 1894; 132 years ago
- Founder(s): Sophia Blackmore; Cpt. Rev. William Shellabear

Architecture
- Architect: Swan and Maclaren
- Style: quasi-Art Deco
- Groundbreaking: 1928
- Completed: 1929

Administration
- Division: Trinity Annual Conference (TRAC)

Clergy
- Pastor: Rev. Anthony Phua

Kampong Kapor Methodist Church (Abbreviation: KKMC) is located on Kampong Kapor Road in Singapore's Little India district. The church is approximately 300 metres from Jalan Besar MRT station.

Founded in 1894, KKMC is one of the first Peranakan churches and the fourth Methodist church to be established in Singapore. During its early years, the church catered to the Peranakan or Straits-born Chinese, with services conducted in Baba Malay in a building located on 155 Middle Road. In 1930, the church moved to 1 Kampong Kapor Road.

The church building on Kampong Kapor Road was given conservation status by Singapore’s Urban Redevelopment Authority in 1989; its earlier building on 155 Middle Road was awarded historic site status in 2000.

== History ==
Founded as a church in 1894, Kampong Kapor Methodist Church began its activities in November 1890, in the lower room of the Deaconess Home. Upon request, Miss Sophia Blackmore, a missionary to Singapore (and also the founder of the Fairfield Methodist Schools and the Methodist Girls' School) started a Sunday Malay language worship service. The group comprised 25 “native” girls from the mission hostel, boys from Epworth Home (precursor of the Methodist Youth Fellowship), Malay-speaking Christian workers from the nearby Mission Press and two missionaries.

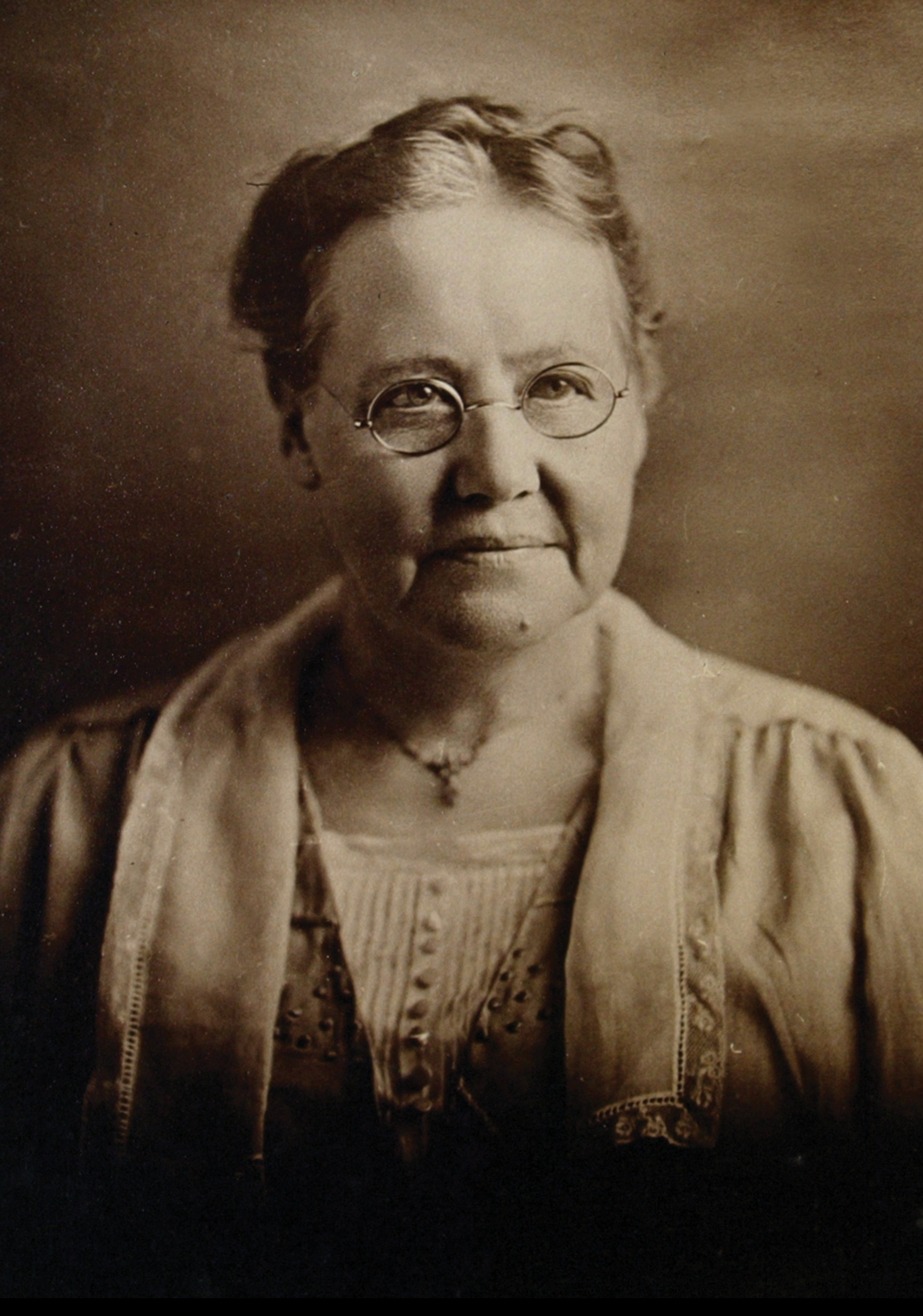
Miss Sophia Blackmore (1857-1945).

On 25 January 1894, this group moved to “The Christian Institute” located on 155 Middle Road to function as a church.

Rev. Shellabear and about a dozen young men held street and kampong meetings in Malay. Meanwhile, Miss Blackmore and her team of women as well as the women missionaries made a deep impression on Nyonya women and their children as they distributed tracts, sang hymns, visited several hundred “native” Straits-born Chinese women in their homes and held Sunday School for “native” children in their homes and along five-foot ways.

The church soon outgrew its Middle Road premises and a new building was constructed on Kampong Kapor Road. It was completed in 1930 and the church became known as The Straits Chinese Methodist Church (Bishop Bickley Memorial). This reflected the largely Chinese membership and the vast donations which the family and friends of Bishop George Harvey Bickley made for the construction of the building.

In 1957 the name was changed to Kampong Kapor Methodist Church.

== Buildings ==
The original building occupied by the church was on 155 Middle Road.

The later church building dates from 1929, and was designed by Swan and Maclaren. Over the years the church has undergone major renovation and rebuilding works which did not affect its main features.

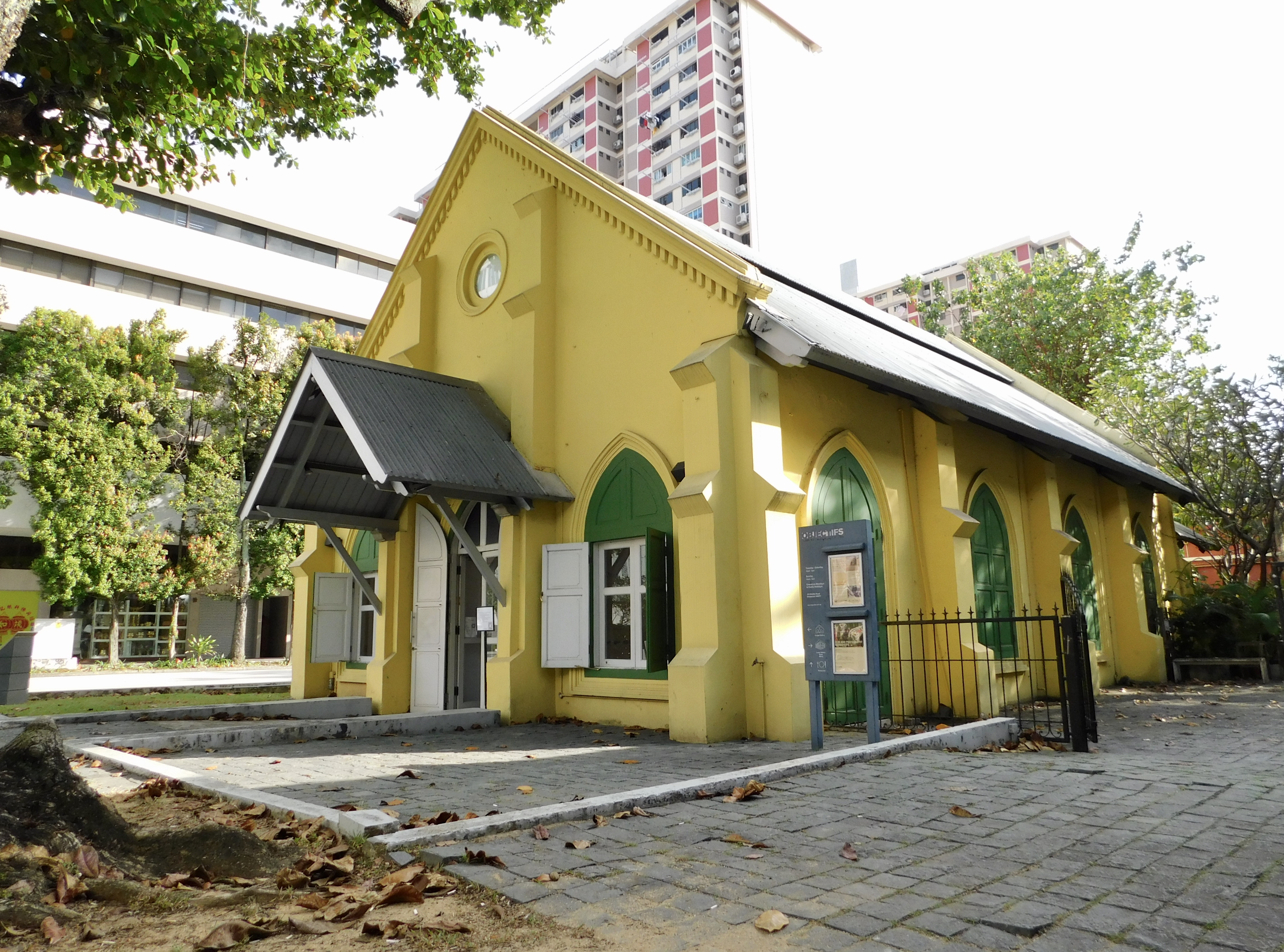
The church’s first place of worship on 155 Middle Road.

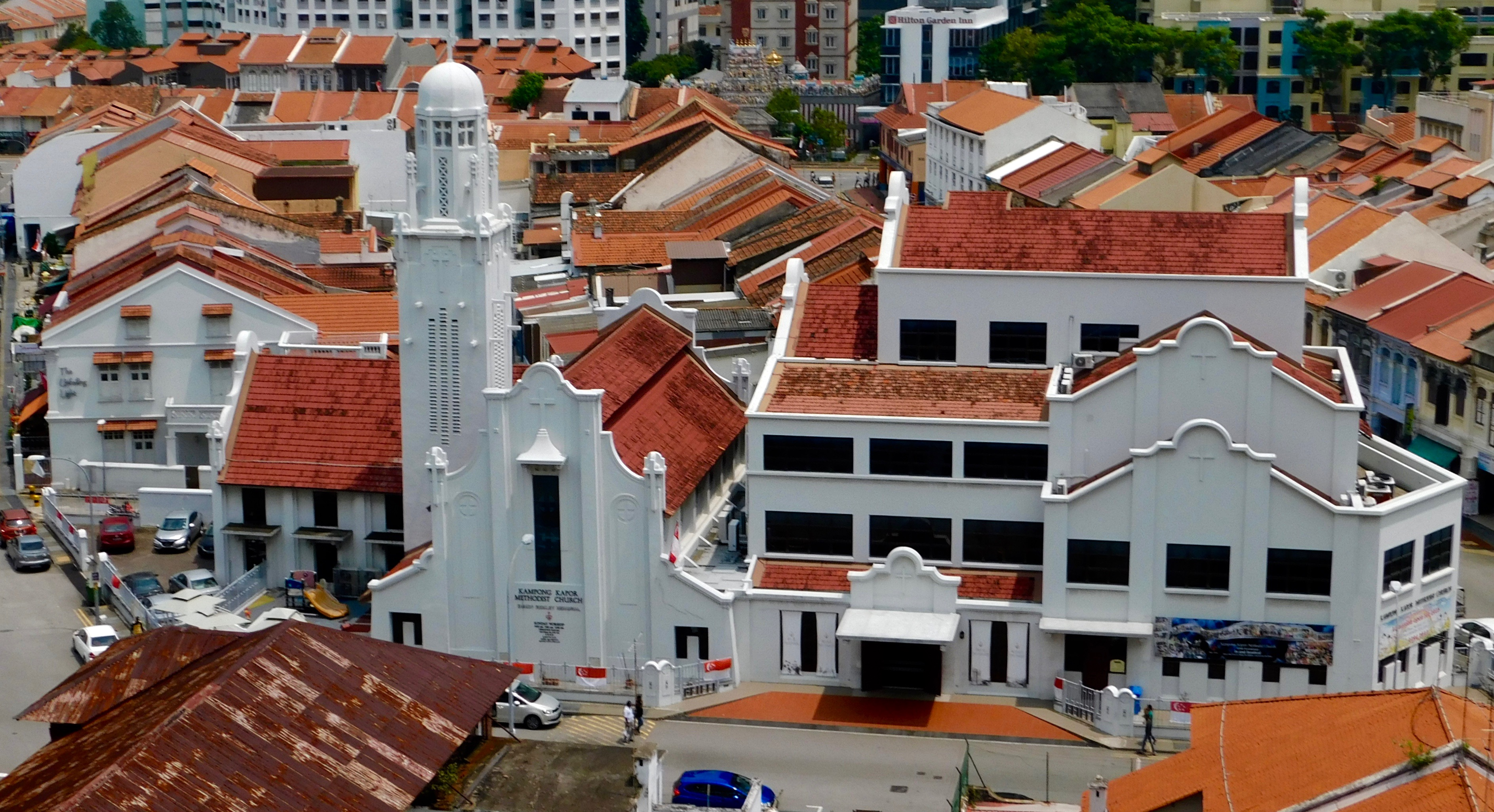
Aerial view of Kampong Kapor Methodist Church. The 1928 building is on the left; the education block (c. 1980s) is on the right

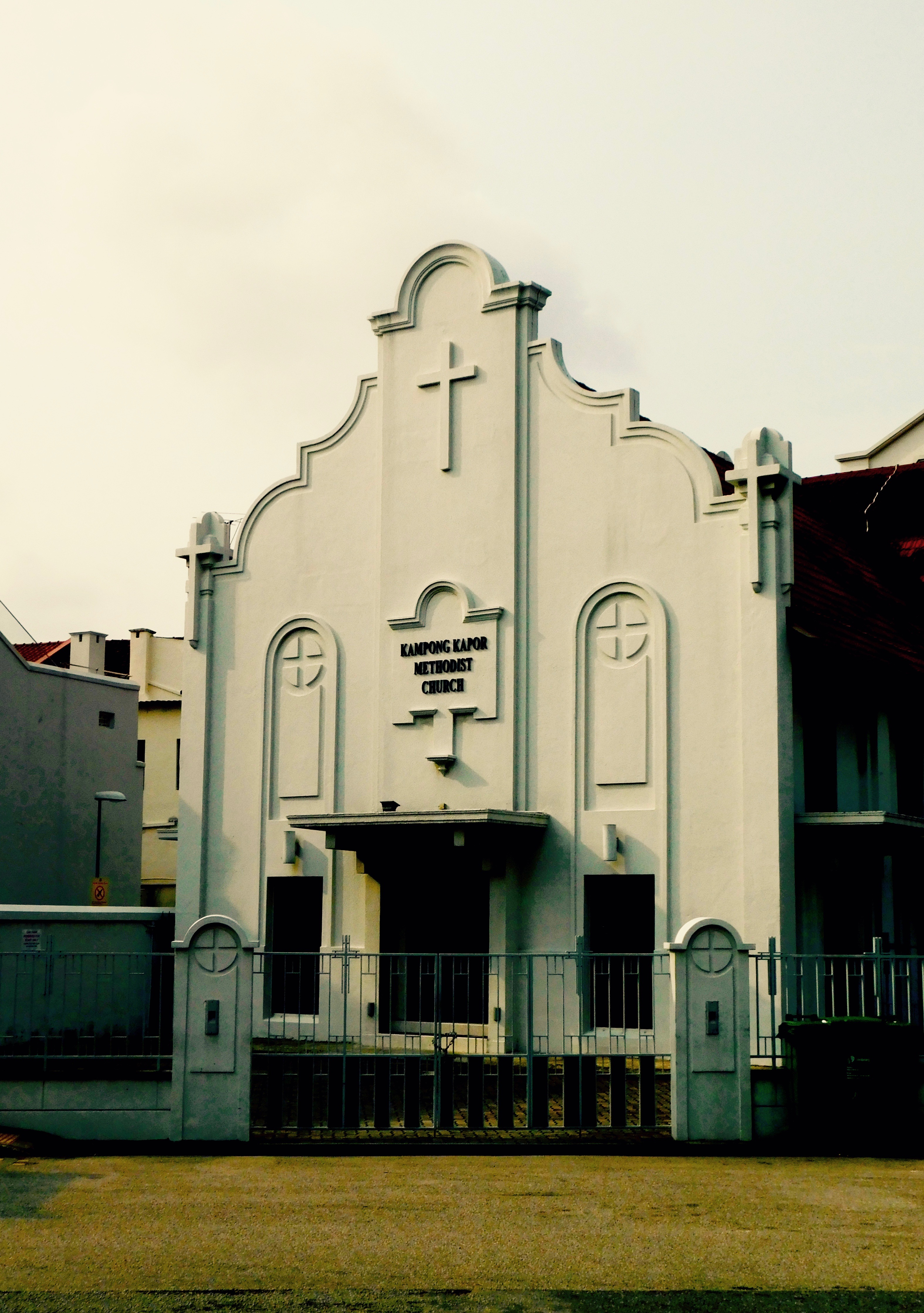
The church’s rear entrance on Cuff Road.

=== Pipe organ ===
The church has one of the few working pipe organs in Singapore. It was installed in 1937.

== News articles ==
- "Scientific research is like writing music, says NUS don". The Straits Times (online). 2016-08-12.
- "Durian parties — a good way to build religious harmony". The Straits Times (online). 2017-07-12.
