= George Carleton Lacy =

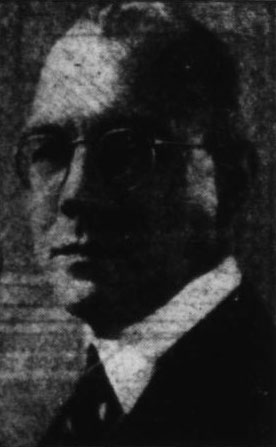
- Bishop of the Methodist Episcopal Church
- Born: December 28, 1888 (Qing dynasty) Fuzhou, China
- Died: December 11, 1951 (aged 62); Fuzhou, China

Signature
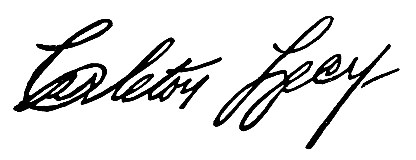

George Carleton Lacy (Chinese: 力宣德; Pinyin: Lì Xuāndé; Foochow Romanized: Lĭk Sŏng-dáik; December 28, 1888 – December 11, 1951) was an American Methodist missionary and the last Methodist bishop in mainland China.

== Life ==
=== Early years and education ===
George Carleton Lacy was born on December 28, 1888, in Fuzhou (Foochow), China. His father was William Henry Lacy, who arrived in Fuzhou in 1887 from Milwaukee, Wisconsin, and directed the Foochow Mission Press and after 1903 the Methodist Publishing House in Shanghai. His mother Emma Nind Lacy, daughter of Mary Clarke Nind, was also an American Methodist Episcopal missionary stationed in Fuzhou. His three brothers, Walter Nind, Henry Veere, and William Irving Lacy, and one sister, Alice Maie Lacy (1893–1921), had also served as missionaries to China. Lacy attended mission schools in Fuzhou and Shanghai before he went to America, where he attended Ohio Wesleyan University (B.A. degree received in 1911), Garrett Biblical Institute (B.D. degree received in 1913), Columbia University and Northwestern University (M.A. degree received in 1914). He was made a doctor of divinity in Garrett in 1928.

=== Missionary life ===
Carleton Lacy had several pastorates in Illinois, Detroit and Wisconsin before he was appointed as a Methodist missionary to China in 1914. He arrived in Shanghai in September 1914. After attending the Language School in Nanking, Lacy served as district superintendent in Jiangxi Province in 1916–1917 and 1919–1920, and president of William Nast College, Jiujiang (原南伟烈大学，现九江同文中学).

In 1921 Lacy was loaned by the Methodist Board of Missions to the American Bible Society where he served as Secretary of its China Agency and in 1933 of the China Bible House formed with the British and Foreign Bible Society. During that time he also served as China correspondent for Zion's Herald and The Christian Century.

Lacy was named in 1921 agency secretary of the American Bible Society in China and in 1933 secretary of the China Bible House and from 1921 to 1941 he had direction of translation and distribution of the Scriptures in many Chinese dialects from the society's office in Shanghai. In 1928 and 1929 he studied at Union Theological Seminary and Columbia University in New York while on furlough. In 1935 he was appointed member of the Joint Commission on the Unity of the Methodist Episcopal Church and Methodist Episcopal Church, South in China.

In 1941 Lacy was elected bishop of the China Central Conference and was assigned to Fuzhou. When his episcopal area was occupied by Japanese troops he traveled extensively in inland China.

=== Death ===
Carleton Lacy's tenure as bishop was set to end in 1949 but the advent of the Communist government made it impossible to hold a general conference or elections. He officially resigned and turned his authority over to Bishop Chen Wenyuan (陳文渊). In 1950 when all foreign missionaries were forced to withdraw from China. Lacy was the only Westerner in Fuzhou area denied an exit permit, detained under house arrest by the newly established regime. During the closing months of his life he had been ill and only his faithful cook was allowed to see him. Within weeks after his request was finally granted, he died of a heart ailment at Union Hospital, Foochow (福州協和醫院) on December 11, 1951. Lacy was buried in the Foochow Mission Cemetery with an unmarked tombstone, and his cook was the only one permitted to attend his funeral. In 1956 his remains were exhumed and paraded through the streets by Communist zealots.

=== Family ===
George Carleton met Harriet Lang Boutelle, who had come to Canton as a YWCA secretary. They married on June 26, 1918, in Chelsea, Massachusetts.

Carleton Lacy's son, Creighton Boutelle "Corky" Lacy, was a long-time professor of World Christianity at the Duke Divinity School. Born in Guling on May 31, 1919, Creighton Lacy grew up in Shanghai and attended Shanghai American School. He later went to the U.S. for college, where he received his A.B. from Swarthmore College in 1941 and B.D. from Yale Divinity School in 1944. In 1947 he returned to China with his wife Frances M. Thompson, a native from Mount Holly, North Carolina, whom he married in 1944. Creighton Lacy subsequently taught philosophy at Nanking University, Bible at Anglo-Chinese College, Foochow, theology at Union Theological School, Foochow, and finally, along with other missionaries, was expelled from China in December 1950, returning to Yale University where he finished his Ph.D. in Christian Social Ethics in 1953. After graduation they moved to Durham, North Carolina, where Creighton Lacy was a professor in the Duke Divinity School until 1991. On October 8, 2010, Creighton Lacy died in Durham, North Carolina, at age 91.

Daughter Eleanor Maie Lacy was born in Shanghai on December 8, 1927.

== Selected works ==
- A Hundred Years of the American Bible Society in China, April 20, 1934 (in Chinese)
- A Sixty Years' Cycle of Bible Society Work in China, May 1936 (in Chinese)
- Jesus for Chinese Youth, 1938
- Self-support in the Chinese Church, 1939
- The Great Migration and the Church in West China, Shanghai, 1941
- The Story of the Foochow Foreign Cemeteries, Fuzhou, 1951
