= Wesley Methodist Church Penang =

Methodist Church in Penang

Coordinates: 5°25′19″N 100°19′28″E

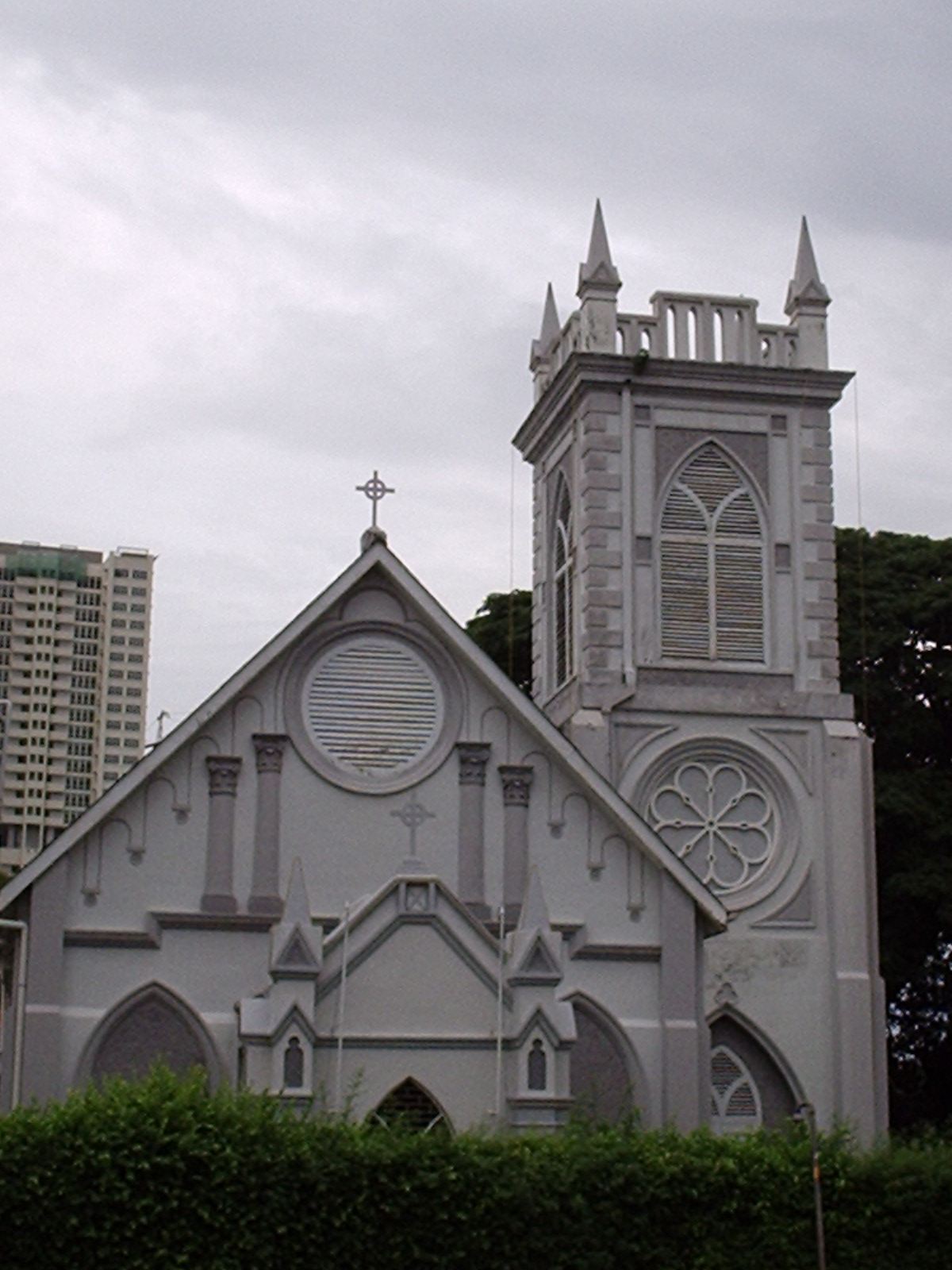
- Wesley Methodist Church Penang
- Address: 136 Jalan Burma, George Town, Pinang, Malaysia
- Language(s): English, Mandarin/Hokkien
- Denomination: Methodist
- Website: https://www.wesleypenang.org/

Architecture
- Architect: C. W. Barnett
- Architectural type: Gothic
- Completed: 1912
- Construction cost: $25,000

Clergy
- Pastor: Rev. Andrew Lim

Wesley Methodist Church Penang is a Methodist church in George Town within the Malaysian state of Penang. Built in 1912, it is situated at the junction of Burmah Road and Larut Road.

== Background ==
The Wesley Methodist Church in Penang can trace its origins back to 1891 when Rev. Daniel Davies Moore, a Methodist Minister from Prince Edward Island, Canada, was commissioned by the Methodist Church in Singapore to establish Methodist services for the English speaking community in Penang, and to help start a Methodist School which would later become known as the Anglo-Chinese School (today, the Methodist Boys' School).

In August 1891, Moore conducted the first Methodist service in English at Penang Town Hall, moving the service a month later to the missionaries' residential quarters, and then, in November, to the Armenian Church in Church Street. In 1893, services were held in a building in Northam Road, before they were moved again to the Anglo-Chinese School.

In 1910, the Methodist Church acquired two buildings at Larut Road to use as a missionary residence and a boarding house. The site for the new church was a triangular piece of land situated between Anson Road, Burmah Road and Larut Road which was purchased at a cost of $8,000. The Larut Road section was acquired from the Municipal Commissioners for the churchyard for which portions of the Anson Road and Burmah Road strips were given in exchange.

A ceremony for the laying of the cornerstone took place on 26 December 1911, presided over by Rev. G. F. Pykett, Superintendent of the Local Conference of the American Methodist Episcopal Mission. A cavity was made inside the granite block in which a box was placed containing a copy of the Bible, the Methodist hymnal, the Methodist Church disciplinary rules, the Malaysian Message (a mission publication), a copy of the Anglo-Chinese School Magazine, and a report on the history of the mission.

The construction of the church was completed in 1912, and a dedication ceremony was held on 26 November 1912 conducted by Bishop W. P. Eveland of the Philippines. It was named the "Fitzgerald Memorial Church" in honour of Bishop Fitzgerald who expressed the wish to build a church in memory of his daughter Cornelia who died in Penang in 1907 whilst he was there attending a Methodist conference. On his return home he died in Hong Kong the same year, before his wish could be realised, and the task of raising money for the memorial church was taken over by Bishop Oldham of Singapore and his wife, who succeeded in raising sufficient funds for the construction estimated to be $25,000.

In 1931, the church was renamed the "Wesley Methodist Church", and three years later, four tablets were unveiled in the church in memory of Bishop Fitzgerald and his daughter, and Rev. G. F. Pykett, a previous pastor and prominent missionary in Penang, and his wife. During World War Two, it was used by the Japanese army as a camp and services were moved to the Chinese Methodist Church in Madras Lane. The period immediately after the end of the World War Two saw a growth in the church's membership and new ministry groups were started including the Women's Society of Christian Service and the Intermediate Youth Fellowship.

== Description ==
The church was constructed in the Gothic architectural style, designed by C.W. Barnett and built by Ah Chiang. It has two entrances, one on Burmah Road under a porch, and the other facing Anson Road, with a portico, under the tower. The rectangular tower, which is finished with pinnacles, is 20 feet square, 60 feet high, and was designed to house a bell.

The main body of the church is 86 feet long and 30 feet wide, and its plastered, brick walls are pierced by seven doors on each side which reach to the raised floor, and are separated by buttresses. The entire concrete floor is covered in polished marble. The large east window was designed to be of stained glass.
