= 77th Street (clothing) =

Streetwear brand

- Type: Private
- Industry: Clothing
- Founded: 1988; 38 years ago
- Defunct: 2016; 10 years ago
- Headquarters: Singapore
- Key people: Elim Chew, Sulim Chew, Chris Chew, Samantha Tan
- Website: http://www.77thstreet.com/

77th Street was a clothing company based in Singapore founded by Elim Chew in 1988 with a small shop at Far East Plaza, Singapore. Citing rising rents, Elim Chew closed the last 77th Street outlet at Ang Mo Kio in 2016.

At its peak, 77th Street had a stronghold in local street wear fashion and accessories scene with a chain of 12 retail outlets around Singapore, 1 retail training centre at ITE College East and the 77th Street Plaza located in the popular shopping district of Xidan in Beijing, China.

77th Street was the first fashion retailer to win the prestigious “Most Distinctive Brand” of Singapore Promising Brand Award given by The Association of Small and Medium Enterprises (ASME) and Lianhe Zaobao in 2004.

== History ==
Elim founded 77th Street in 1988. It was her first foray into the retail industry and has since established a firm footing in the street wear scene in Singapore. It started with a humble beginning at Far East Plaza level four with only a 180 square feet (17 m^{2}) store. With the help of her sister, Ms Sulim Chew, who was in charge of sourcing trendy items from [London], the second shop was opened three years later in 1991 at the same mall but on level three. Subsequently, about one new store was opened every one to two years.

77th Street's first overseas expansion attempt was a joint venture store in Kuala Lumpur, Malaysia with a Malaysian partner in 1995. Seeing the potential for 77th Street to franchise in Malaysia beyond KL, this joint venture was later sold to the partner, whom renamed the company to another name. In 2003, 77th Street secured and signed an agreement for a 400,000 square feet (37,000 m^{2}) mall which was conceptualised into a youth shopping cum activity belt in the popular shopping district of Xidan, Beijing, China. The following year, Dr Vivian Balakrishnan, Minister for Community Development, Youth & Sports (MCYS) and Senior Minister for State for Trade & Industry and National Development was the Guest of Honour for the official opening for 77th Street Plaza at the Xidan Cultural Centre. Not only this marked the company's first business venture in China, it was also the first Singapore retailer to set up a shopping mall in China.

In April 2016, she said in an interview with The Straits Times that the brand was shutting its stores over the years because of higher rentals and manpower shortages, from 16 stores at one point, and down to just two - at Bugis Junction and Ang Mo Kio Hub.

77th Street closed its last outlet at Ang Mo Kio Hub in July 2016. Founder Elim Chew told Channel News Asia and TODAY that high rentals was the reason behind the decision to shut down, contrasting the present rental rate of S$35 per square foot with the rate of S$9 per square foot when she first started the business.

== Youth Olympic Games YOG 2010 ==
77th Street put a team of local designers together to create T-shirts inspired by Singapore's Youth Olympic Games YOG bid. It had also collaborated with CityCare, a volunteer group, to make 50,000 car decals to giveaway to drivers to display as a gesture of supporting the country's bid.
