= Singapore Prestige Brand Award =

Annual award

The Singapore Prestige Brand Award is an annual award which recognizes outstanding efforts within the Small and Medium-sized Enterprises (SME) sector.

== History ==
In 2002, the Association of Small and Medium Enterprises (ASME) collaborated with Singapore's Chinese daily newspaper, Lianhe Zaobao, to create a new award, Singapore Promising Brand Award. A new Heritage Brand Award category was established for its 2005 edition.

In 2007, the award was rebranded as Singapore Prestige Brand Award.

== Judging criteria ==
A point system is used to access entries over five broad criteria, broken down as follows:

- Brand strategy / identity
- Brand culture
- Integrated brand communications
- Brand equity
- Brand performance
