= Blogshop =

Retail business in Singapore

A blogshop or blog shop is a consumer based retail business using blogging platforms such as Blogger, WordPress, or Livejournal. The concept is popular in Singapore.

The capital involved in setting up a blog shop is usually free or low cost, as merchants can set up their shop using free blog platforms. Some blogshops have been very successful for their owners.

Items sold in a blogshop can range from mass merchandise such as clothes and accessories, to less common items such as height increase insoles and handmade items.

== Types of platforms ==
There are many blogging platforms available today that are used for blogshops. Basic platforms that are commonly used include LiveJournal, Blogger and WordPress. Some blog shops move to content manage system websites to improve the productivity for their websites. These new blog shops are either powered by Drupal, Joomla or customized systems.

== Scams ==
Controversies around blogshops involve non-delivery of goods. In 2010, a number of blogshop owners in Singapore were allegedly cheated by their landlord.
