= Mary Clarke Nind =

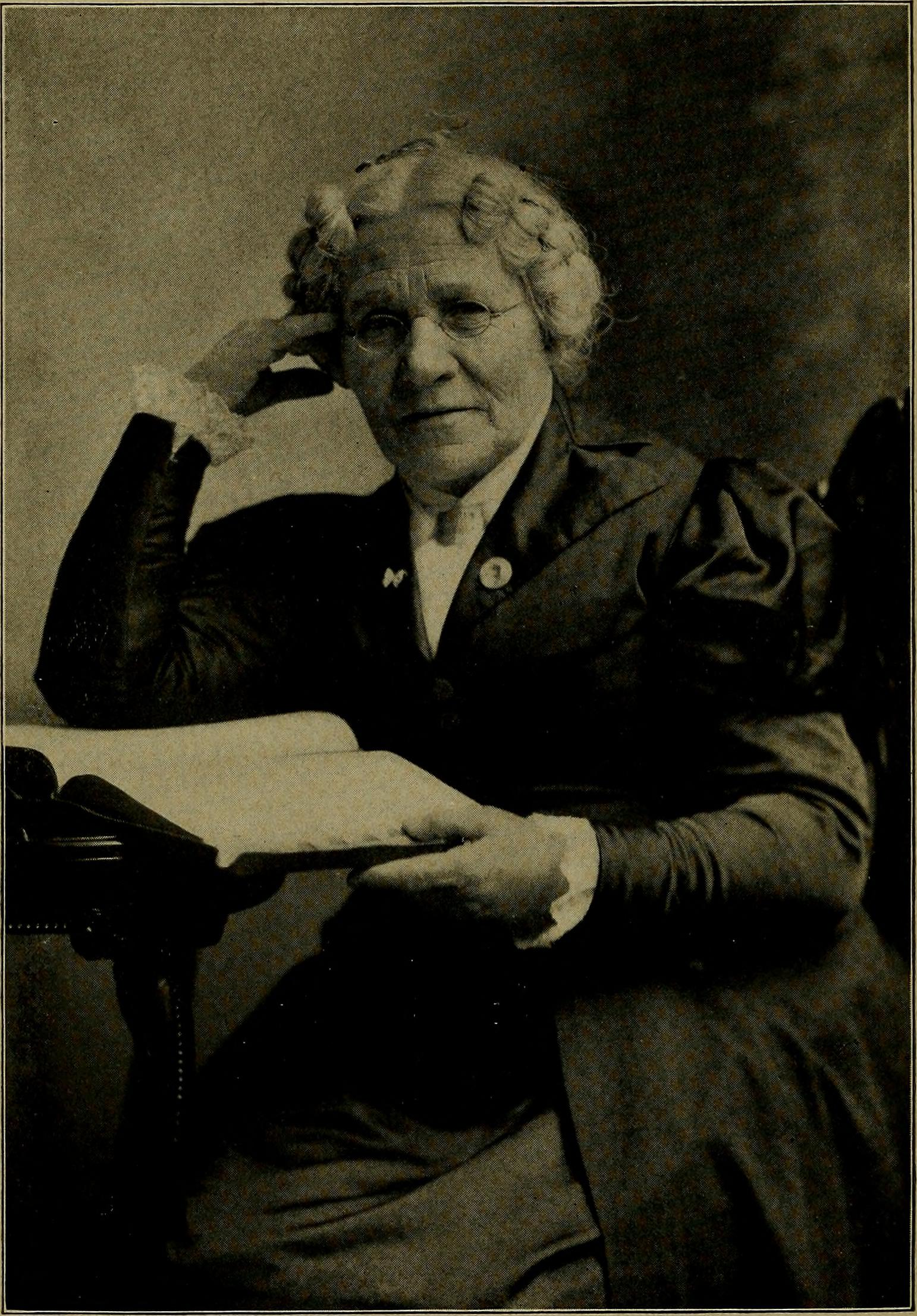
- Born: 16 August 1825; Essex, United Kingdom
- Died: 1 January 1905 (aged 80); Littleton, Massachusetts, United States
- Occupations: Methodist Episcopal Missionary, philanthropist, social justice worker

Mary Clarke Nind (16 August 1825 – 1 January 1905), known as "Our Little Bishop", was a British philanthropist and worker for social justice. It was during her time living in Minnesota that she fulfilled her calling into missionary work through the Woman's Foreign Missionary Society of the Methodist Episcopal Church.

== Early life ==
Mary Clarke was born in Essex, England, the daughter of Ebenezer and Louisa Clarke. "I was born six miles from London, England, the child of pious parents, who led their six children to the Savior, converted before five years of age. The memory of my conversion is still fresh and delightful."

She was teaching in the Sabbath school by the age of 12 and at the age of 14, she was united with a Congregational Church. In 1850 she came to the United States, the bride of James G. Nind.

== Career ==
In her spiritual life, Mary was tormented. She could see others much older than she was struggling to achieve a life of salvation. "Must I go on to thirty, forty, fifty, sixty years, and still have to fight against my easily besetting sins, and every now and then be conquered? Is there no hope of victory all the time?"

It was not until she was introduced to the Methodist movement that she began to move "into the light." A pastor of her Congregational Church aligned with the Methodist movement and began to teach about sanctifying grace. When the pastor was dismissed from the Congregational Church, about 40 members moved to the Free Methodist Church. Mary occasionally went to the Methodist meetings and was more than once disciplined and charged with "schism" - holding Methodist doctrines in a Congregational Church. Mary was tormented over her devotion to the Congregational Church and her desire to reach a "higher life" through sanctification. One day after church, she encountered a woman who had lived through many afflictions and Mary opened up to her about her torment. She replied, "Mrs. Nind, we shall all miss you if you decide to leave the Congregational Church; but if I were you I would go into the Methodist Church. You will be more happy and more useful there, for there is more liberty for women to exercise their gifts." Taking this as a sign from God, she abruptly left the Congregational Church and joined the Methodist Episcopal Church.

"I raised a new Ebenezer of gratitude, 'for hitherto the Lord had helped me.' Anew I consecrated myself to the Lord and His service, and with new consecrations came new joy." Mary wrote the story of her spiritual struggle and final victory in a leaflet titled "Into the Light"; the leaflet was widely used during the Civil War as a source of inspiration.

== Woman's Foreign Ministry Society ==
In 1866, Mary and her husband moved to Winona, Minnesota. Her eagerness to "win souls for Christ" led her into evangelistic work. On 4 April 1870, the Western branch of the Woman's Foreign Missionary Society of the Methodist Episcopal Church (WFMS) was formed; and Mary was the first to enlist for work. The WFMS is one of the forerunners of the United Methodist Women. In 18 years during the 1870s and 1880s, Mary raised $17.5 million for the WFMS on "two cents and a prayer a day" from the women of the Methodist Church.

She traveled the nation, China, Tibet, India, Japan, Africa, and South America bearing messages of salvation and became known worldwide as an evangelist. She also became known as "Mother" Nind in the WFMS. In Methodist circles, she was also known as "Our Little Bishop." As a result of her missionary work, Mary is considered by some to be one of the top women of influence in the Methodist Church along with Susanna Wesley and Barbara Heck.

In 1878, her son moved to Minneapolis, and to be closer to him, Mary also moved. She became a member of Centenary M. E. Church. The leaders of the WFMS led by Mrs. Franc Elliott in Nebraska, set forth a cause to have women elected as representatives to the male-dominated General Conference and the Minnesota Lay Conference: five other conferences responded to the call. At the Minnesota Lay Conference of 1887, which met at Centenary Church, elected Mary as one of the representatives, even though she was not in attendance. She was one of five women nationally who presented credentials at the 1888 General Conference. The others were Frances E. Willard, Amanda C. Rippey, Angie F. Newman and Elizabeth D. Van Kirk.

After the conference was assembled, a committee on eligibility was formed to consider the question. The committee reported to the General Conference and the matter was debated over the course of 5 days before the women were denied their seats. Nind observed the entire proceedings from the balcony. It would not be until 1904 that women were given laity rights and admitted as delegates to the General Conference of the Methodist Episcopal Church (1922 for the M.E. Church, South).

At the close of the General Conference, discouraged, Nind went to London and attended the World's Missionary Conference. After that she traveled around the world, visiting the chief mission stations. When she returned she moved to Detroit in about 1891 or 1892.

In 1894, she travelled to Japan and toured around the country beginning in May.

== Death and legacy ==
In September 1905, she traveled to Massachusetts where she had a son living in Boston. On 1 September 1905, "Mother" Nind was at a missionary day celebration in Northampton, Massachusetts. There she was afforded a place of honor. She conducted the opening services with a Bible reading on the resurrection of Jesus and offered a prayer "of marvelous beauty and devotion, which seemed to our informant to indicate 'a wonderful spirituality and nearness of approach to God.'" The next day she was visiting friends in Littleton, Massachusetts. Mary retired for the evening in an upper bedroom of the home. Shortly after, a fire started in the house, which rapidly filled with smoke. Mary died just a few months from her 80th birthday.

Her children published her biography, Mary Clarke Nind: A Memorial.

Her Bible is held with the Lacy family papers at Yale University.

== Family ==
She married James G. Nind and they moved to Illinois. They had five children, losing one at the age of 3. Two of her daughters later became missionaries, one going to Fuzhou and the other to Madeira Islands. Several of her grandchildren, including George Carleton Lacy, also served as missionaries.

== See also ==
Sophia Blackmore

== Bibliography ==
- History of Wesley Church, The First 125 Years, Wesley United Methodist Church, 1977
- Nind, J. Newton, Wesley Archives, Mary Clarke Nind and Her Work, by Her Children, 1906, Chicago, Woman's Foreign Missionary Society
- Boeder, Thelma, Minnesota Annual Conference
