= William Fitzjames Oldham =

Reverend William Oldham
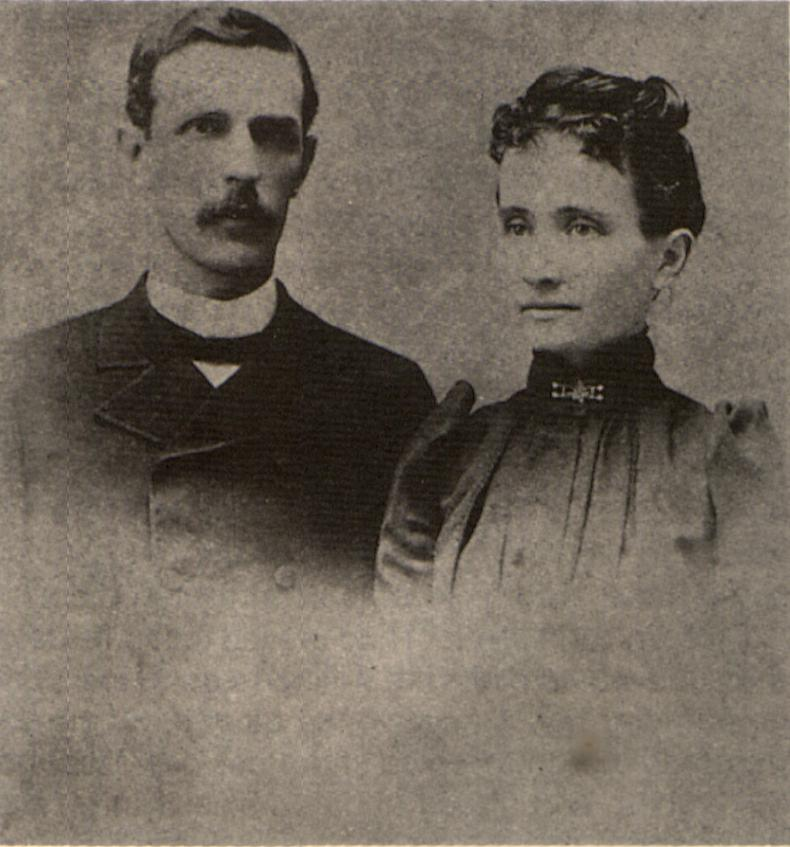
- Oldham and his wife, Marie Augusta Mulligan
- Born: 15 December 1854; Bangalore, Karnataka, India
- Died: 27 March 1937 (aged 82); Glendale, California, United States
- Burial place: Forest Lawn Memorial Park
- Education: Boston University (BA); Allegheny College (MA)
- Known for: Founder of Anglo Chinese School
- Spouse: Marie Augusta Mulligan

William Fitzjames Oldham (15 December 1854 – 27 March 1937) was a British-American bishop of the Methodist Episcopal Church and missionary bishop for South Asia. He distinguished himself as a missionary, an author and a church official. He was the founder of Anglo Chinese School in Singapore in 1886.

== Early life ==
William was born in Bangalore, India, the son of an Irish couple, James and Mary Elizabeth Oldham. James was a British officer commanding Sepoy troops in India. William's ancestry was primarily Anglo-Irish, with some Indian blood, it was said, on his mother's side. Although he was baptized a Roman Catholic, his earliest religious contacts came from Protestant military chaplains and the headmaster of the Madras Christian College. His father, though a Catholic, had turned anti-Romanist, and Oldham had absorbed the religious teachings of the Protestants when attending Anglican schools. He recollected that as a child of six, missionaries had taught him the childs prayer, "O Lord save me, O Lord Christ convert me" which remained with him to adulthood and helped transform his faith. The young Oldham studied Paley's Evidences of Christianity so well he won a competitive prize for this subject. Oldham's keen abilities in apologetics came to the fore in Madras Christian College where non-Christians frequently presented strong counter-arguments against Christianity, although he claimed that during this time he did not yet have a true Christian faith. Interestingly, Oldham had a pet white tiger at the age of 6. This was a gift from his friendly neighbours, the Gnani family, who owned a pet tiger.

== Education and conversion ==
Oldham earned a B.A. degree from Boston University and an M.A. from Allegheny College, and became a government surveyor. He was handpicked for the Great Trigonometric Survey of India, a key 19th century survey of India and its adjoining lands.

It was in 1873, in the midst of this secular work, that Oldham was invited to the preaching tents of visiting American Daniel O. Fox. The teachings of these Methodist missionaries, led by Bishop William Taylor, were strange yet attractive to Oldham. Bishop Taylor himself had served in far-flung mission fields including the Americas and Australia, and had been brought to India through the invitation of Bishop James Thoburn. Bishop Thoburn also had a Chinese background, and he was to be an influence on Oldham's decision to serve in Southeast Asia and later to assume the mantle of the Bishopric. Oldham later compiled Thoburn's biography in a work entitled Thoburn Called of God (1918), testifying to the influence of his mentor. He thus was converted and became a Methodist at Poona while attending evangelistic services held by Taylor.

During this time he met Marie Augusta Mulligan (1857–1938); the two of them later married and started to work as educational missionaries. In 1879 Oldham traveled to Allegheny College in Meadville, Pennsylvania, for training; Marie later travelled to the US to study at Mt Holyoke College.

After graduation in 1885 Oldham was sent to Singapore to initiate a Methodist mission. There he found access to the Chinese merchant population through schools; he established what became the first of a large number of Methodist schools in what was then British Malaya and the Dutch East Indies (Indonesia), as well as the first Methodist Church in Singapore.

== Missionary ministry ==
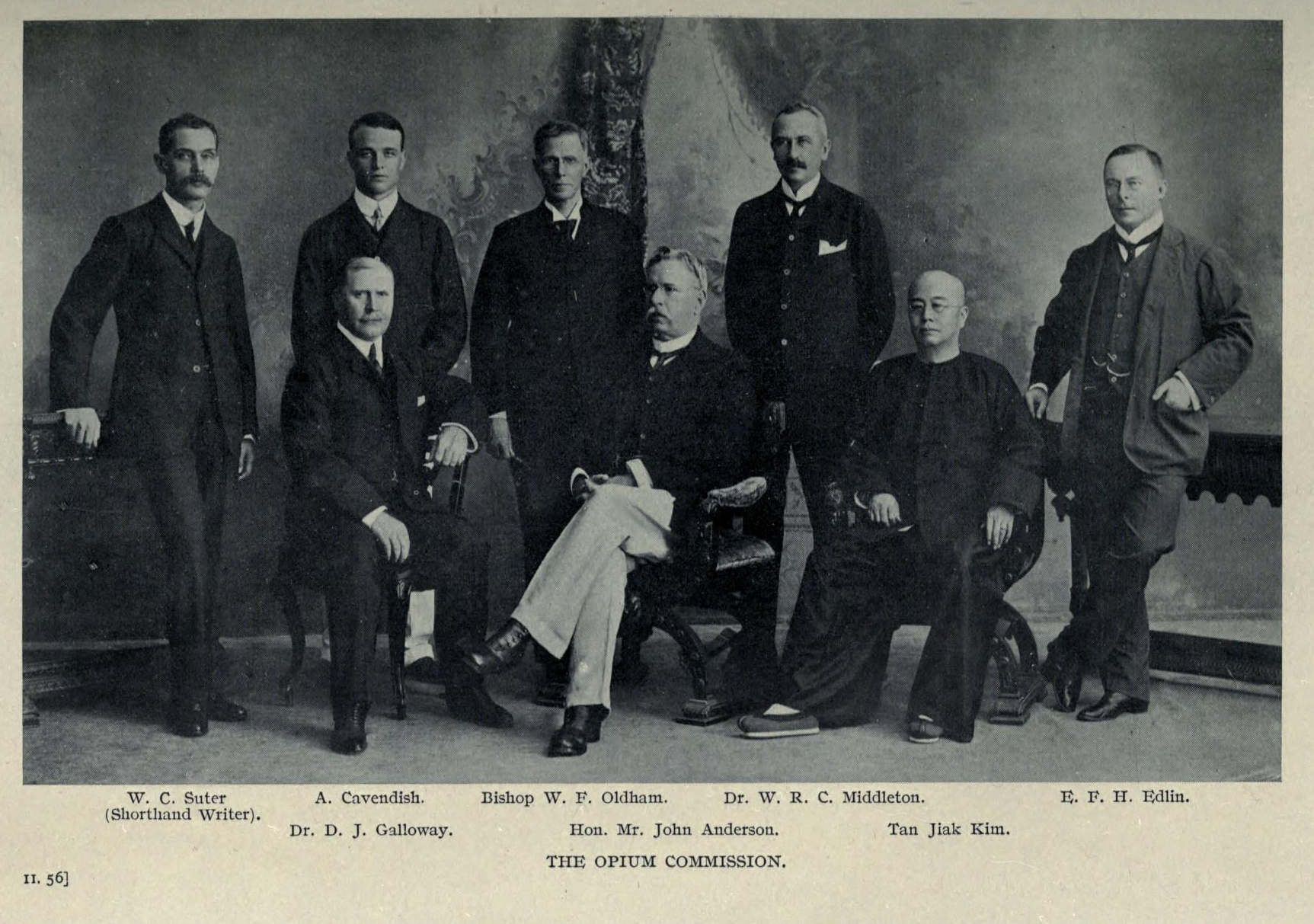
Oldham with other members of the Opium Commission

Oldham entered the Michigan Annual Conference of the M.E. Church in 1883. He also served for a time under the auspices of the Ohio Conference. He was the founder of a mission ministry in Singapore. The Oldhams were then appointed to accompany Bishop Thoburn to begin pioneering Methodist work in Singapore. They arrived on 7 February 1885 on the SS Khandalla, and were welcomed by Charles Phillips. The Oldhams' work included English services at the Town Hall, talks in homes, evangelistic meetings at The Christian Institute at Waterloo Street and regular street preaching. Sometimes pelted by rotten eggs during his outdoor preaching, this gifted orator nevertheless attracted a following, and on Oldham's 32nd birthday in 1886, the first local Methodist Church held its dedication service. In due time, it became known as the Wesley Methodist Church. At its stone-laying ceremony in 1907, Oldham remembered, with pride, how the church had been self-sufficient from the day it was established, funded mainly by a small band of believers united by the English language and their faith.

The first Chinese to join the Methodist Church led Oldham to participate in the Celestial Reasoning Association, a debating society which the Straits Chinese formed to help develop their skills in English and moral thinking. At a meeting held in the home of Tan Keong Saik, Oldham gave a talk on astronomy. The Association, presided by the Chinese Consul to Singapore, thus introduced Oldham to educated and well-to-do Chinese merchants who were keen to have their sons and themselves educated in English and Western culture. With 13 boys in a shophouse and strong funding from these Chinese merchants, Oldham began the Anglo-Chinese School at 70 Amoy Street on 1 March 1886; Within a year he had an enrolment of more than 100 boys. The first boys included Tan Keong Saik's sons and Tan Jiak Kim's brothers. Within a year he had an enrolment of more than 100 boys. Oldham was greatly encouraged when half of the $12,000 required to build the new school building at Coleman Street was almost wholly raised by the Chinese largely through the influence of Tan Jiak Kim. In 1902, the student boarding house was renamed Oldham Hall.

In addition to founding the Anglo-Chinese School, Oldham also established the Anglo-Tamil School in September 1885 with the help of the first foreign recruit, M Gnanamuthoo, a Tamil teacher who had been a resident in Rangoon. It was, however, the education of girls that Oldham was keen to leave his mark. With strong help from Sophia Blackmore, an Australian missionary who had arrived in Singapore via India in 1887, the Fairfield Methodist Girls' School as well as the Methodist Girls' School were subsequently established. Although these schools were built as American Methodist institutions, the Englishman had good support from the British government in Malaya. In the setting up of these institutions, Oldham had also received much help from fellow missionaries and educationists such as Dr Shellabear, Rev. W. T. Cherry, Rev. G. F. Pykett and Rev. W. E. Horley. These schools extended English education to the locals and thus laid the foundation of an English-speaking workforce. Some of Oldham's noteworthy pupils included Rev Goh Hood Keng, one of the earliest local preachers.

Oldham also continued Ms Cooke's ministry for seamen, holding Sunday services on-board ships. With his fluency in Tamil, he held regular services for jailed Tamil prisoners at the Bras Basah jail. Oldham went on to appoint Benjamin Pillai to serve the Tamil community. Work amongst the Tamils grew steadily under the leadership of C. W. Underwood who had come to Singapore via Jaffna, Ceylon in 1887. Oldham was also instrumental in helping to set up the publishing industry in the Methodist church, which he did by purchasing a printing press and by sending W. G. Shellabear, a noteworthy Malay scholar, for training in printing. This eventually led to the establishment of the Methodist Publishing House (MPH). Oldham was also involved in the early beginnings of medical missions which was spearheaded by Dr B. F. West, with Oldham bringing medical supplies from India. Unfortunately, with a full day teaching at school and preaching on weekends, the work soon took its toll on Oldham who, after four years of labour, had to take leave for the United States in 1889.

Oldham was a member of M.E. General Conferences in 1880, 1900, 1904, 1908 and 1912. He was a delegate to the Second and Fourth Ecumenical Conferences in 1891 and 1911, as well as the Edinburgh Convention in 1910.

== Episcopal ministry ==
Even in America, Oldham continued to serve actively, leading churches, lecturing and encouraging future church leaders to work in Southeast Asia. He established a vibrant ministry while serving as a pastor in Butler Street Church in Pittsburgh, and was also the Chair of Missions at the Ohio Wesleyan University. At Pittsburgh, a revival drew more than 60 young men. Among them was Titus Lowe who later succeeded Oldham as Bishop to Malaysia. In 1895, at Ohio Wesleyan University, Oldham founded the Chair of Missions and Comparative Religions, and taught about Southeast Asia from his years of experience.

When he was appointed in 1904 as Missionary Bishop of Southern Asia, Oldham used Singapore as his base for his travels to the Philippines, Indonesia and parts of Malaya. He was officially welcomed as bishop in Singapore on 23 February 1905. Under his episcopacy, he extended the missions to the Malay Peninsula and Java and Sumatra. Oldham also organised the missions into the four key language groups, namely English, Tamil, Malay and Chinese - a structure that continues to exist in the Methodist churches of Singapore today. Continuing his work in educational missions, Oldham pushed for a higher level of education and mooted for an Anglo-Chinese College but this did not materialise until the founding of the Raffles College decades later. He also saw to the founding of the Jean Hamilton Memorial School, the first local institution to train Asian ministers. On 4 February 1909, Oldham officially opened the Wesley Methodist Church, and raised funds for the construction of the Wesley Methodist Church in Penang which opened in 1912. During this time, Oldham published his reflections on Malaya in a book entitled Malaysia: Natures wonderland (1907). He also served as an Assistant (Corresponding) Secretary of Missions for his denomination, beginning in 1912.

During his term, Oldham also faced difficult challenges. In 1909, Nicholas Zamora, an eloquent leader in the Methodist Church in the Philippines, led an attempt to secede from the episcopacy which Oldham had been heading. The painful split in the Filipina Methodist Church was a difficult matter for the Bishop.

== Ministry beyond Asia ==
He was elected a bishop of the M.E. Church in 1916, serving until his death. His office was at 150 Fifth Avenue, New York City and his residence was in Leonia, New Jersey. He was also a trustee of the Union Missionary Institute in Brooklyn, New York. He also served as an Assistant (Corresponding) Secretary of Missions for his denomination, beginning in 1912.

Despite his popularity and success, Oldham's term as bishop in Asia came to an abrupt in 1912 when he was appointed a coordinate secretary to the Methodist Board of Foreign Missions in New York. His abilities in fundraising and networking were needed to reduce the financial crisis the Board was facing. Oldham rose to the occasion and settled the crisis in four years. Whilst in this position, he also encouraged more indigenous leadership. Oldham went on to take charge of the Methodist work as Bishop to South America in Buenos Aires in 1916. Even there, he and his wife continued to establish schools.

In Asia, Oldham saw two major losses to his missions: the Java missions was discontinued in 1928, and the Methodist Publishing House was relinquished to a secular company in 1927. The Oldhams ended their term of service in 1928 where Oldham retired to Broad Street Church in Columbus, Ohio, before returning to Bangalore in 1933.

In November 1934, Oldham and his wife returned to Singapore from Bangalore to celebrate the Golden Jubilee (50th anniversary) of the founding of the Methodist Church in Singapore which was to be held in January the following year. By this time the Oldhams had become American citizens. This was to be Oldham's last visit to Singapore. He died 27 March 1937 in Pasadena, California, at the age of 83.

Today, Oldham is remembered annually on 1 March, designated as Founder's Day at the Anglo-Chinese Schools. In memory of him, the Wesley Methodist church also erected an apse in 1957 to commemorate its 50th anniversary. The stained-glass window at the apse shows the life of Oldham and the church's milestones. Oldham Lane near Dhoby Ghaut, is named after him.

== Death and burial ==
Oldham died on 27 March 1937 in Glendale, California, United States and was buried in Forest Lawn Memorial Park.

== Selected writings ==
- Translated from Malaysia, Charles A. Gray, pamphlet, 1889.
- Sketch of Thoburn, The Picket Line of Missions, 1897.
- The Study of Missions in Colleges, Student Missionary Appeal, 1898.
- Presenting the Gospel to Non-Christian Peoples, Ecumenical Missionary Conference, 1900.
- Addresses: What the Missionary Secretary Can Do and The Deaconess as a Missionary Worker, First General Missionary Convention, Cleveland, 1903.
- Malaysia, Nature's Wonderland, 1907.
- Address: To Advance in Foreign Missions, Militant Methodism, Downey et al., Eds., 1913.
- Address: The Crucial Hour of Missions in Non-Christian Lands, The Second General Missionary Conference, 1913.
- India, Malaysia, the Philippines, 1914.
- Graves Missionary Lectures, 1914.
- The World Task and Opportunity, New England Methodism's Convention, Ed. E.C.E. Dorion, 1915.
- Address in Challenge of Today, 1915.
- Introduction, Bishop Frank Warne's Story of His Conversion, 1915. (33 pages)
- Address: Book of Devotions, 1916.
- Thoburn - Called of God, 1918.
- A Doll's House, 1869

== Bibliography ==
- Doraisamy, T. R. (1979). Oldham - called of God : profile of a pioneer : Bishop William Fitzjames Oldham. Singapore: Methodist Book Room
- Doraisamy, T. R. (1982). The march of Methodism in Singapore and Malaysia, 1885 1980 (pp. 1–25). Singapore: Methodist Book Room
- Doraisamy, T. R. (Ed.). (1982). Forever beginnining: One hundred years of Methodism in Singapore (Vol. 1, pp. 4–17). Singapore: The Methodist Church in Singapore.
- Koh, T., Auger, T., Yap, J. et al. (2006). Singapore: The encyclopedia (p. 390). Singapore: Editions Didier Millet.
- Makepeace, W., Brooke, G. E., & Braddell, R. St. J. (Eds.). (1991). One hundred years of Singapore (Vol. 2, pp. 267–270). Singapore: Oxford University Press.
- Arrival of Bishop Oldham [Microfilm: NL 297]. (1905, February 2). The Straits Times, p. 5.
- Bishop Oldham: Back in Malaya for Methodist Jubilee [Microfilm: NL 1493]. (1934, November 19). The Straits Times, p. 10.
- Bishop Oldham: Celebration of his 75th birthday [Microfilm: NL 632]. (1930, February 5). The Straits Times, p. 17.
- Bishop Oldham to leave early [Microfilm: NL 1495]. (1935, January 18). The Straits Times, p. 13.
- Bishop Oldham: Relinquishes his work in Malaysia [Microfilm: NL 362]. (1912, July 10). The Straits Times, p. 9.
- Bishop Oldham and opium [Microfilm: NL 328]. (1910, October 4). The Straits Times, p. 6.
- Bishop Oldham - The founder of Malayan Methodism [Microfilm: NL 549]. (1926, December 30). The Straits Times, p. 10.
- Bishop Oldham's return to Singapore [Microfilm: NL297]. (1905, January 19). The Straits Times, p. 8.
- Bishop W. F. Oldham D. D.: An appreciation [Microfilm: NL 297]. (1905, January 20). The Straits Times, p. 5.
- C-Gs tribute to Bishop [Microfilm: NL 2507]. (1951, March 2). The Straits Times, p. 7.
- Chan, Chin Bock. (1956, February 26). The sentinel of Bukit Timah [Microfilm: NL 1814]. The Straits Times, p. 17.
- Fifty years of Malayan Methodism [Microfilm: NL 1494]. (1934, December 16). The Straits Times, p. 5.
- Local tribute to Bishop Oldham [Microfilm: NL 1522]. (1937, April 12). The Straits Times, p. 13.
- Malaya's future [Microfilm: NL 539]. (1927, February 7). The Straits Times, p. 12.
- Memorial to a Methodist pioneer [Microfilm: NL 1807]. (1957, April 23). The Straits Times, p. 5.
- A Methodist schism: Independence causes secession in Philippines [Microfilm: NL 319]. (1909, March 16). The Straits Times, p. 7.
- A mission for seamen [Microfilm: NL 299]. (1905, May 9). The Straits Times, p. 5.
- "The Morning Light" Historical pageant. The founding of Methodism [Microfilm: NL 1495]. (1935, January 8). The Straits Times, p. 13.
- Veteran founder of Malayan Methodist Mission dead [Microfilm: NL 1521]. (1937, March 30). The Straits Times, p. 12.
- A vision that was fulfilled. Methodists Jubilee. Wonderful tributes to Bishop Oldham [Microfilm: NL 1495]. (1935, January 10). The Straits Times, p. 7.
- Teo, P. & Lau, E. (2005, February). Celebrating our 120th anniversary. Methodist Message. Retrieved August 14, 2008 from http://www.methodistmessage.com/feb2005/120anniversary.html
