= Elim Chew =

Singaporean fashion designer (born 1965)

Elim Chew (born 1966) is the founder of the street wear brand, 77th Street.

== Career ==
Elim's first attempt into the retailing turned out to be a huge success in the retail scene. Prior to that, she was in Britain undergoing a hairdressing course and returned to Singapore to open a salon.

In addition to expanding her retail businesses, Elim lent her expertise, experience and time to various youth organisations in Singapore. She co-founded Singapore Street Festival – a platform for showcasing local talents in areas such as performing arts, visual art forms, fashion, entertainment and sports, The Young Entrepreneur Mastery (TYEM) – a non-profit academy that supported youth entrepreneurship and inculcated an entrepreneurial mindset in out-of-school youths. Elim was also a founding member and director of the Social Innovation Park (SIP), a social enterprise incubator which aimed to provide a replicable set of integrated services and resources that would help create a platform to support social entrepreneurs' business models that advocated societal change. Through this platform, she championed Pop and Talent Hub, the first social enterprise talent development platform in Singapore which gathered talents from social homes, institutions and also professional artists to sell their artworks with the objective of making them self-reliant.

== Community work ==
As part of Elim's on-going community campaigns, she launched My Voice in 2004 which was a book featuring 77 earnest real life experiences written by youths from all walks of life. My Voice was supported by MCYS, South East Community Development Centre (CDC), UFM 100.3FM and Drama Box. The 2nd edition of My Voice – Breaking Free was launched subsequently on 9 December 2006. All proceeds from the sale of My Voice was used for funding life skills, entrepreneurial and creative skills workshops run by TYEM, which guided youths to take on life challenges with purpose and confidence.

On top of that, Elim also sat in over 20 committees. She chaired and co-chaired several public service, youth and community groups including the Programming Committee for *scape. *scape was an iconic youth community space for free expressions supported by MCYS and National Youth Council of Singapore (NYC) and Action Community for Entrepreneurship (ACE) of Ministry of Trade and Industry. She was a member on the Board of Trustees, Entrepreneurship Committee and Investment Committee at the National University of Singapore.She got the award for the most Promising Woman Entrepreneur in 2001 by the Singapore Association of Small and Medium Enterprises

== Awards ==
Her accolades included being named the "Most Promising Woman Entrepreneur of the Year" by ASME in 2001, awarded "Mont Blanc Businesswomen Award" in 2002, "Young Woman Achiever Award" by Her World and "Leadership and Mentoring Award" by Research Communications International in 2003. She acknowledged that her first award in 2001 gave her the opportunity to become a youth ambassador in Singapore.

== Personal life ==
She is a member of City Harvest Church. When key members of the church were charged by CAD she was quoted : "City Harvest has been my family for 21 years and a family comes together in challenging times".
