= List of bishops of the Methodist Church in Singapore =

This is a list of bishops of the Methodist Church in Singapore, in order of their election to the episcopacy, both living and dead.

== Elected by General Conference, U.S.A. to superintend Methodist work in Southern and Southeast Asia ==
- James M Thoburn (1888–1904)
- Frank W Warne [assisting James M Thoburn] (1900–1904)
- William F Oldham (1904–1912)
- John E Robinson (1912–1914)
- William P Eveland (1914–1916)
- [No Resident Bishop - Episcopal duties covered by Bishops John E Robinson and JW Robinson] (1916–1920)
- George H Bickley (1920–1924)
- Titus Lowe (1924–1928)
- Edwin F Lee (1928–1948)
- [No Resident Bishop - Episcopal duties covered by Bishops Ralph Cushman and Arthur J Moore] (1948–1950)

== Elected by Southeastern Asia Central Conference ==
- Raymond L Archer (1950–1956)
- Hobart B Amstutz (1956–1964)
- Robert F Lundy (1964–1968)

== Elected by The Methodist Church in Malaysia and Singapore ==
- Yap Kim Hao (1968–1973)
- Theodore R Doraisamy (1973–1976)

== Elected by The Methodist Church in Singapore ==
- Kao Jih Chung (1976–1984)
- Ho Chee Sin (1984–1996)
- Wong Kiam Thau (1996–2000)
- Robert M Solomon (2000–2012)
- Wee Boon Hup (2012–2016)
- Chong Chin Chung (2016–2020)
- Gordon C. I. Wong (2020–2024)
- Philip Lim Kian Leong (2024–
