= Elsa Andersson (disambiguation) =

Elsa Andersson (1897–1922) was a Swedish aviator.

Elsa Andersson may also refer to:

- Elsa Andersson (artist) (1915–1996), Swedish artist
- Elsa Andersson (diver) (1894–1994), Swedish diver
