= Wesley United Methodist Church =

Wesley United Methodist Church is a common name. It can refer to several churches in the United States:

- Wesley United Methodist Church (Worcester, Massachusetts)
- Wesley United Methodist Church (Minneapolis, Minnesota)
- Wesley United Methodist Church (Sikeston, Missouri)
- Wesley United Methodist Church (Bryan, Ohio)
- Wesley United Methodist Church (El Reno, Oklahoma)
- Wesley United Methodist Church (Bryan, Texas)
- Wesley United Methodist Church (Austin, Texas)
- Wesley United Methodist Church (Reynolds Store, Virginia)
- Wesley United Methodist Church (Olongapo City, Philippines)

== See also ==
- Wesley Church (disambiguation)
- Wesley Methodist Church (disambiguation)
