= Yap Kim Hao =

Yap Kim Hao (1929 – 16 November 2017) was the first Asian bishop of the Methodist Church in Singapore and Malaysia and an advocate of LGBT rights in Singapore.

Yap was the vice-president of the Inter-Religious Organisation, the Convenor of Singapore Interfaith Network on Aids and the chairman of the Chen Su Lan Trust. He was also the pastoral advisor of the Free Community Church.

== Early life and education ==
Yap was born in Port Dickson, Malaysia in 1929. He attended the Baker University in Baldwin City, Kansas in the United States, where he obtained his degree in Biology and Chemistry. He then attended the Boston University, where he obtained his Master of Divinity degree and his Doctor of Theology degree.

== Career ==
In 1957, he became a full-time minister at the Wesley Methodist Church. In 1968, Yap was consecrated the first Asian bishop of the Methodist Church in Singapore and Malaysia. From 1973 to 1985, he served as the General Secretary of the Christian Conference of Asia.

Yap retired from full-time Christian ministry in the 1990s. After his retirement, Yap continued to advocate for many causes, including LGBT rights in Singapore. Miak Siew of the Free Community Church, which Yap was pastoral advisor, said Yap "was the first religious leader to voice support for LGBT people".

In 2012, he was awarded the Red Ribbon Award by Action for AIDS for promoting safe sex programmes and fighting the stigmatisation and discrimination of those with HIV.

In 2014, Yale-NUS College established the Yap Kim Hao Professorship in Comparative Religious Studies with a $2 million gift from an anonymous donor.

== Personal life and death ==
Yap was married and had four children, grandchildren and a greatgrandchild.

He died of heart failure on 16 November 2017.

== Books ==
- Doing Theology In A Pluralistic World (The Methodist Book Room, 1990) ISBN 981-00-2403-7
- From Prapat to Colombo: History of the Christian Conference of Asia (1957-1995) (Christian Conference of Asia, 1995)
- A Bishop Remembers (Gospel Works, 2006) ISBN 981-05-5145-2
