= Samuel Lindsey House =

Historic house in Delaware, United States

- U.S. National Register of Historic Places
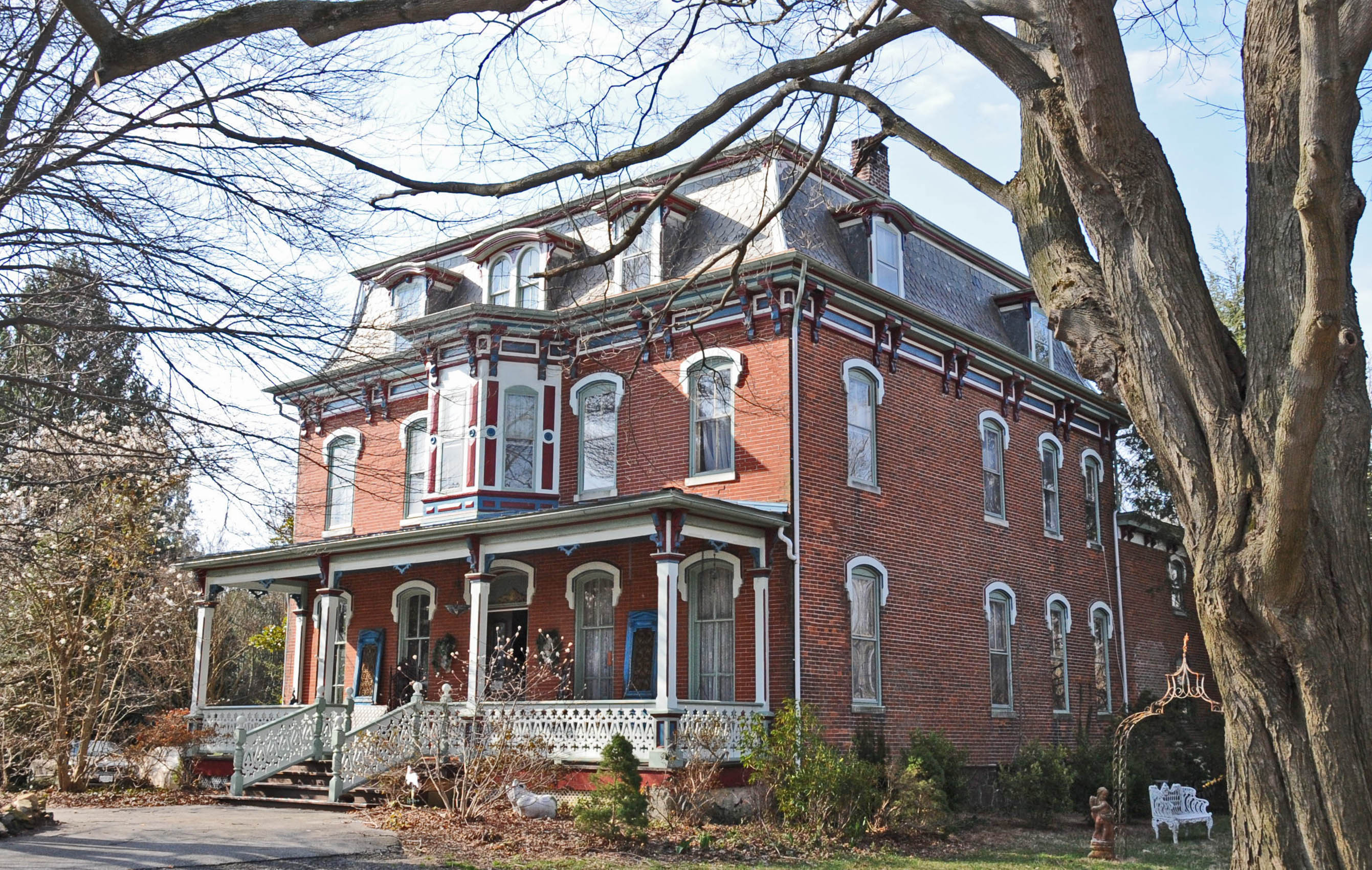
- The Samuel Lindsey House in 2016

- Location within Delaware Location within the United States
- Location: 693 New London Rd., McClellandville, Delaware
- Coordinates: 39.707563°N 75.776615°W
- Area: 2.8 acres (1.1 ha)
- Built: c. 1875
- Architectural style: Second Empire
- MPS: White Clay Creek Hundred MRA
- NRHP reference No.: 83001397
- Added to NRHP: August 19, 1983

Samuel Lindsey House is a historic home located at McClellandville, New Castle County, Delaware. It was built in the 1870s, and is a 2 1/2-story, Second Empire style brick dwelling with a mansard roof. It has a five bay front facade and an original two story, brick wing extending from the rear elevation. Built as a single dwelling, it has been converted into apartments at one time, and also used as a school.

It was added to the National Register of Historic Places in 1983.
