= Methodist Church in Singapore =

Christian denomination in Singapore

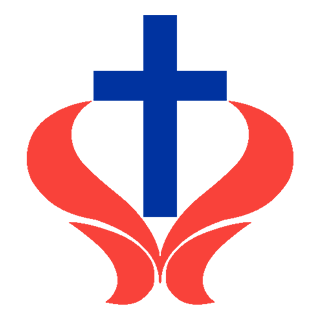
- Classification: Protestant
- Theology: Methodism
- Polity: Connectionalism (Modified episcopal polity)
- Bishop: Rev. Philip Lim
- Founder: John Wesley (spiritually)
- Origin: 1885
- Members: 45,000
- Places of worship: 46
- Official website: methodist.org.sg

The Methodist Church in Singapore (MCS) is the church that Methodists in Singapore belong to. The Church has 46 churches island-wide with around 45,000 members and is the largest mainstream Protestant denomination in Singapore. Its current bishop and head of the Church is Bishop Philip Lim, who was elected at the 13th Session of the General Conference on 6 December 2024.

The Church also has 15 schools, 13 kindergartens and five childcare centres under its umbrella.

On 19 September 2025, MCS celebrated 140 years.

== History ==
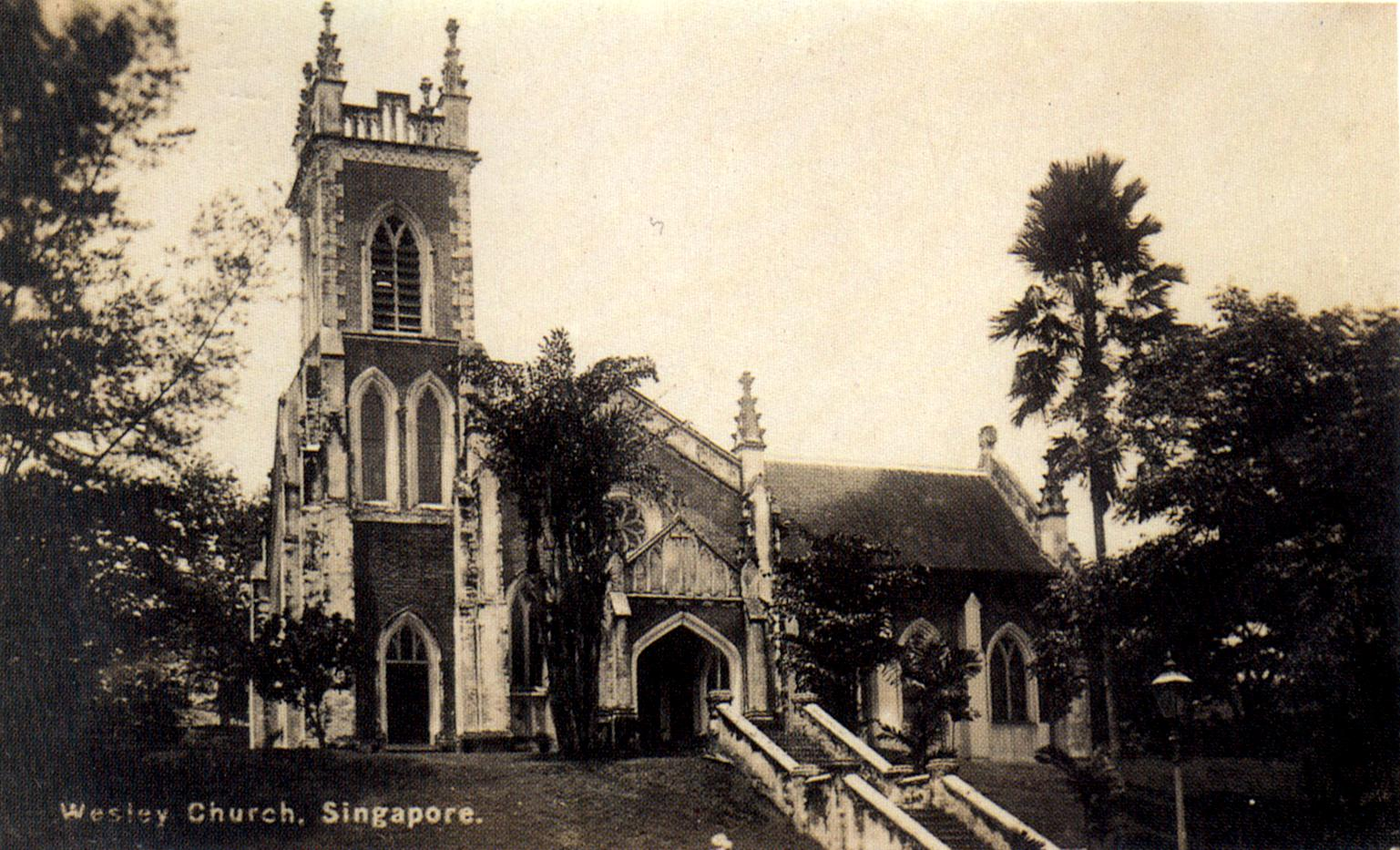
Wesley Methodist Church was initiated in February 1885. The church is sited on Fort Canning Hill.

The Methodist Church in Singapore started out as a missionary initiative by Rev James Thoburn of the South India Conference in British Raj India in 1885 . Rev William Fitzjames Oldham travelled to Singapore to plant the foundations of the mission. Oldham started the church's first English-language boys' school in 1886, the Anglo-Chinese School. Two girls' schools (Methodist Girls' School and Fairfield Methodist Girls' School) were subsequently established in 1887 and 1888, respectively. The mission also developed a clinic and hostels for homeless children.

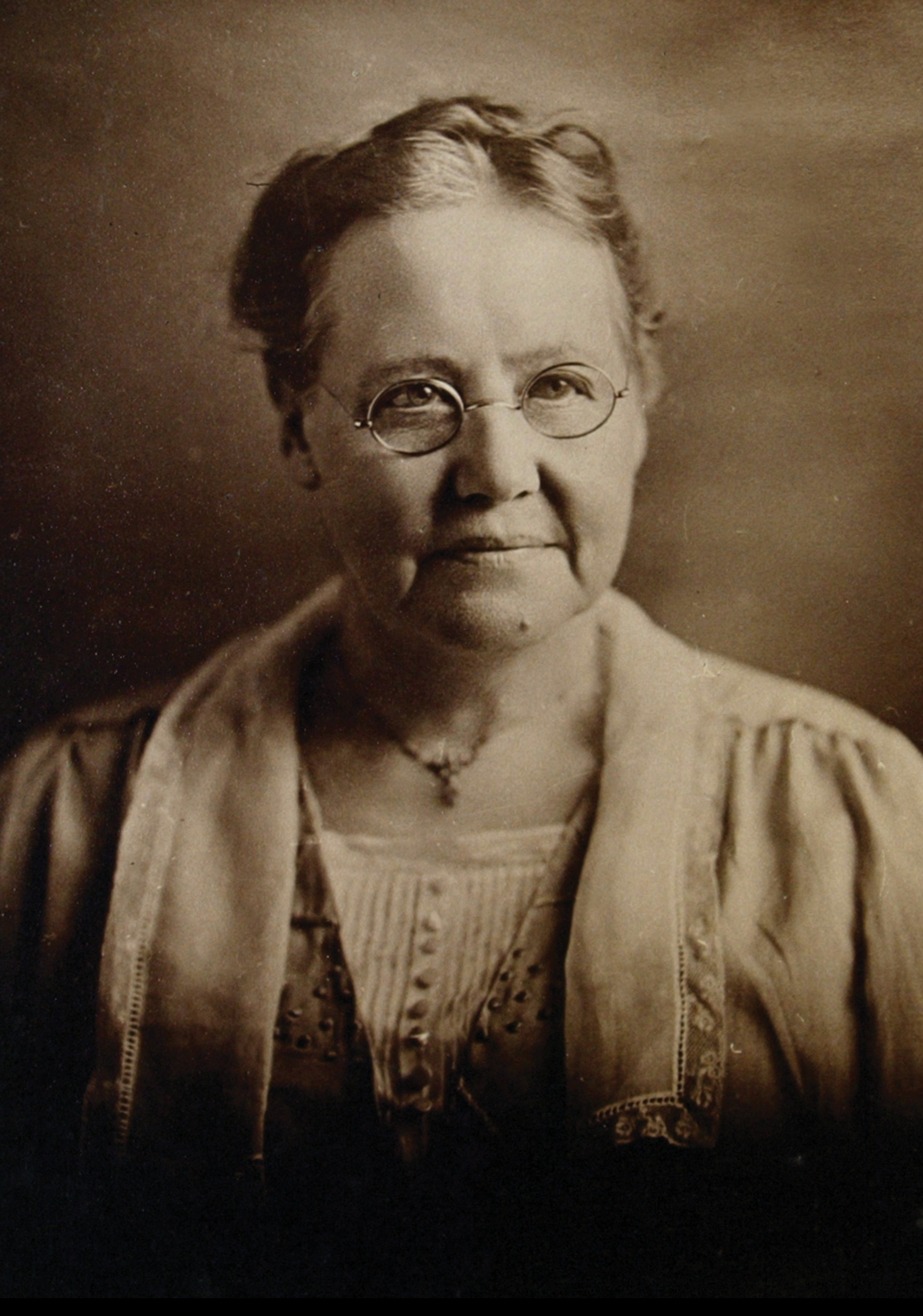
Miss Sophia Blackmore (1857-1945) was the first woman missionary sent by the Methodist Women's Foreign Missionary Society to work in Singapore. She help found the Methodist Girls' School in August 1887 and the Fairfield Methodist Schools in 1888. She was also closely associated with the founding of Kampong Kapor Methodist Church, setting up a boarding home for girls, supporting the early Methodist Peranakan Chinese Christian work, and publishing a Christian periodical in Baba Malay. She returned to Australia in 1927.

From this Singapore base, the mission then spread to the Malay Peninsula and Sarawak in the 1890s. The Methodist Mission in Singapore and Malaya expanded over time, eventually growing to the administrative status of a conference in the Methodist Church. Eventually, the church spread throughout Southeast Asia, leading to the establishment of the Southeast Asian Central Conference in 1950.

The Malaysian and Singapore components of the mission officially became autonomous of their Western parent bodies in 1968; thus, becoming an Asian church with a bishop elected from the local ministers. In 1976, the church was restructured into The Methodist Church in Singapore and The Methodist Church in Malaysia to reflect the secession of Singapore from Malaysia.

== Organisation ==
The Methodist Church in Singapore, which consists of 46 local congregations, is organised in conferences: general conference, annual conferences, district and local conferences.

The General Conference, which meets every four years, is the highest decision-making body of the MCS, led by the elected Bishop and an equal number of elected representatives (both clergy and laity) from each of the three Annual Conferences. For day-to-day matters between sessions of the General Conference, the powers of the General Conference are to be found in the General Conference Executive Council (GCEC).

The General Conference is the only body that speaks officially for the church. No person, no paper, no organisation has the authority to speak officially for The Methodist Church, this right having been reserved exclusively to the General Conference under the Constitution.

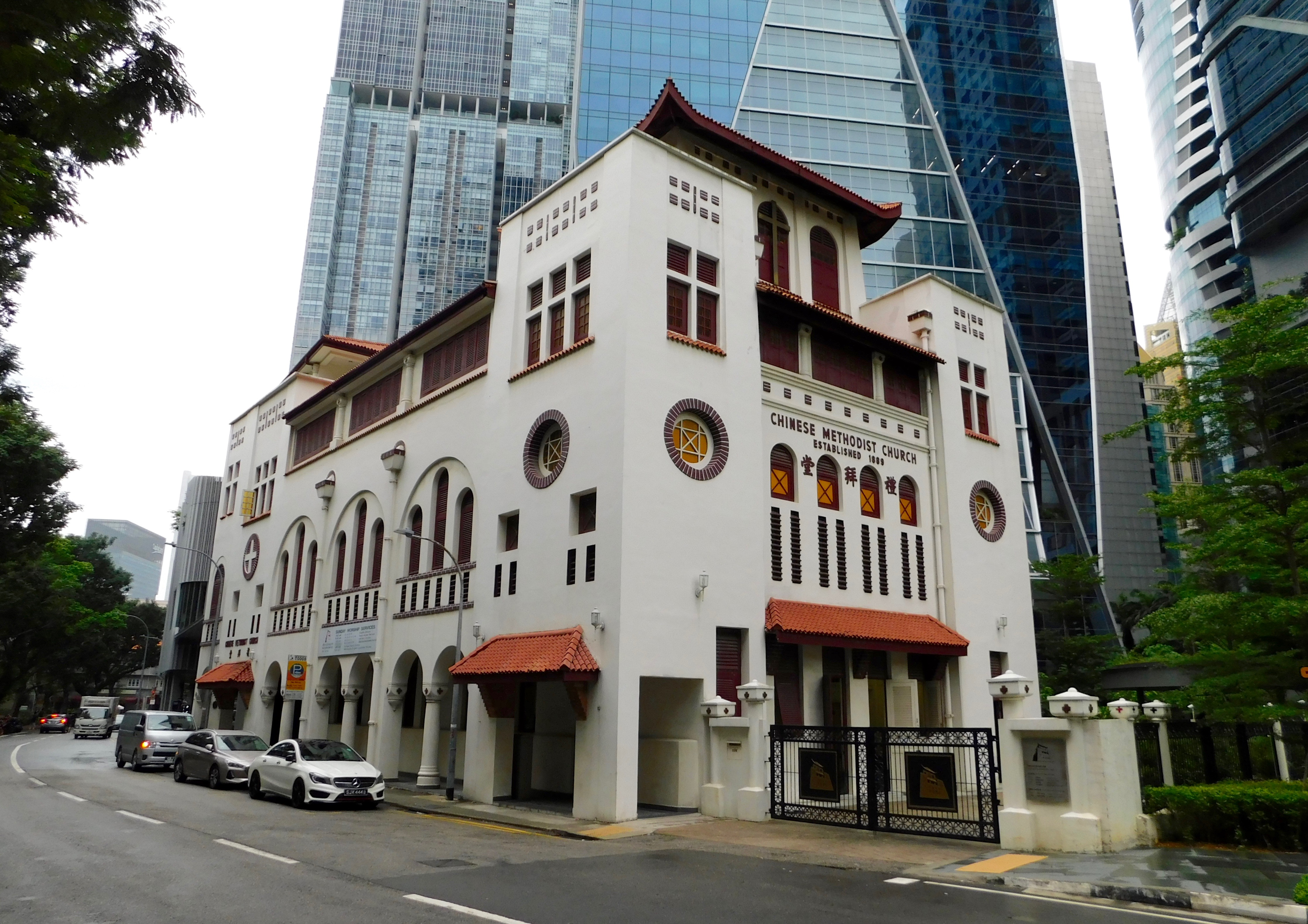
The Telok Ayer Chinese Methodist Church (TA1) was instituted in 1889. It was gazetted a national monument by the Urban Redevelopment Authority of Singapore on 23 March 1989.

The Women's Society of Christian Service (WSCS) was set up to help Methodist women grow in the knowledge and experience of God as revealed in Jesus Christ, challenge them to respond to God's redemptive fellowship, to make Christ known throughout the world and to develop a personal responsibility for the whole task of the Church. Its ministries include Spiritual Life, Social Concerns, Christian Education and Missions.

The Methodist Missions Society (MMS) was established in 1991 as the missions agency of The Methodist Church in Singapore. MMS seeks to establish indigenous churches supported by mission endeavours in communities across the region where there is no Methodist presence. The current focus is on the Asian region, particularly Cambodia, China, Nepal, Thailand and Vietnam, owing to their proximity to Singapore and the multiple opportunities to reach the large numbers of unreached people groups in these countries for religious conversion.

The Methodist Welfare Services (MWS) is the outreach and social-concerns arm of The Methodist Church in Singapore. It provides care, support and practical help to communities experiencing poverty in well-being – such as poor health, fractured relationships, broken dignity and financial distress – through an integrated range of 22 healthcare and social services. These include a home care & hospice service, nursing homes, a senior care centre, active ageing centres, the Christalite Methodist Home for the destitute, family service centres, parenting and marriage support, a debt clearance and asset building scheme, a girls’ residence and student care centre. MWS’ support extends to all, regardless of their ethnicities and religions.

The Methodist Church in Singapore is a member of the National Council of Churches of Singapore.

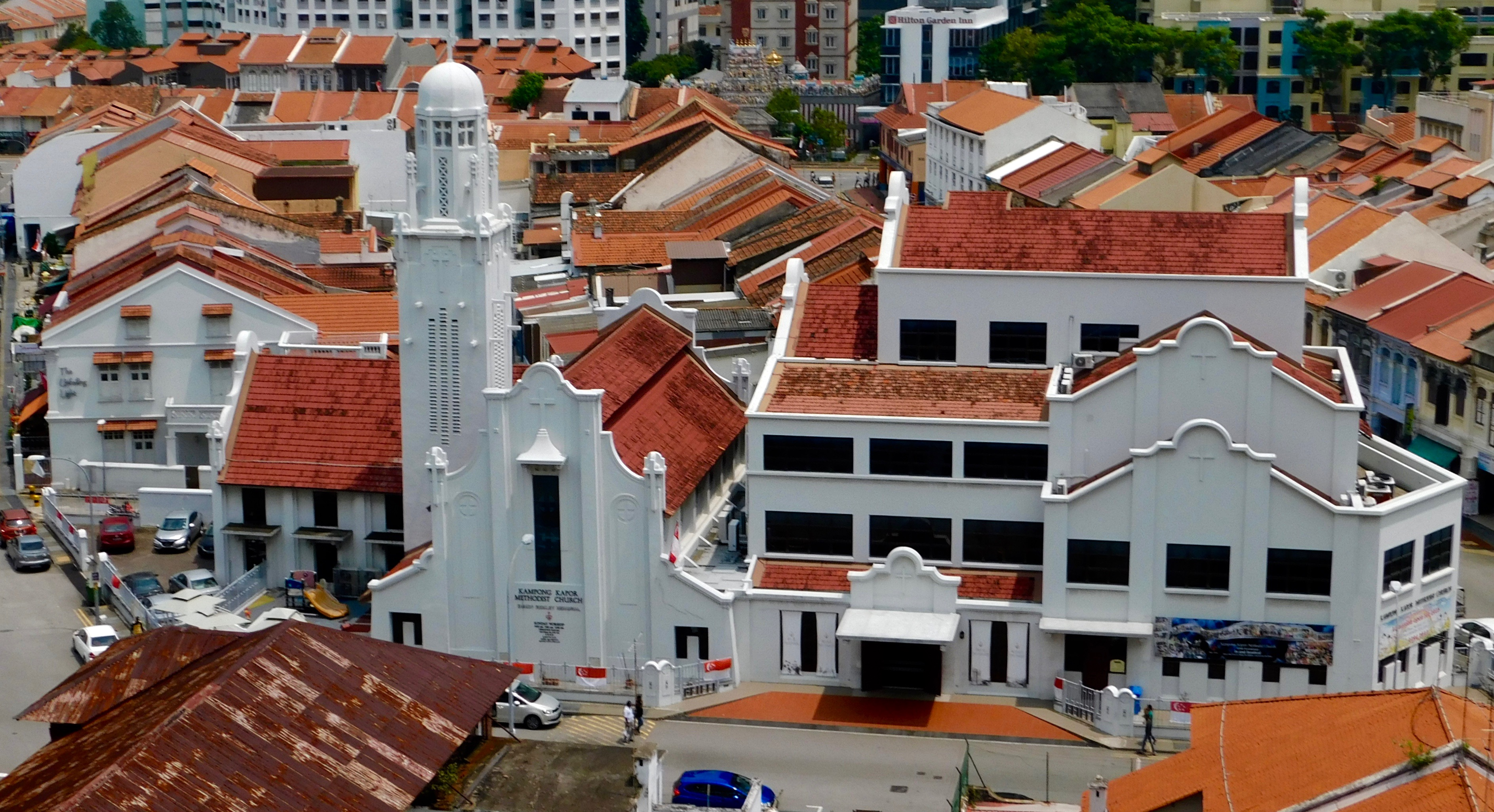
Aerial view of Kampong Kapor Methodist Church. The 1928 building is on the left; the education block (c. 1980s) is on the right

== List of bishops ==
This is a list of Bishops of the Methodist Church in Singapore, in order of their election to the episcopacy, both living and dead.

=== Elected by General Conference, U.S.A. to superintend Methodist work in Southern and Southeast Asia ===
- James M Thoburn (1888 - 1904)
- Frank W Warne [assisting James M Thoburn] (1900 - 1904)
- William F Oldham (1904 - 1912)
- John E Robinson (1912 - 1914)
- William P Eveland (1914 - 1916)
- [No Resident Bishop - Episcopal duties covered by Bishops John E Robinson and JW Robinson] (1916 - 1920)
- George H Bickley (1920 - 1924)
- Titus Lowe (1924 - 1928)
- Edwin F Lee (1928 - 1948)
- [No Resident Bishop - Episcopal duties covered by Bishops Ralph Cushman and Arthur J Moore] (1948 - 1950)

=== Elected by Southeastern Asia Central Conference ===
- Raymond L Archer (1950 - 1956)
- Hobart B Amstutz (1956 - 1964)
- Robert F Lundy (1964 - 1968)

=== Elected by The Methodist Church in Malaysia and Singapore ===
- Yap Kim Hao (1968 - 1973)
- Theodore R Doraisamy (1973 - 1976)

=== Elected by The Methodist Church in Singapore ===
- Kao Jih Chung (1976 - 1984)
- Ho Chee Sin (1984 - 1996)
- Wong Kiam Thau (1996 - 2000)
- Robert M Solomon (2000 - 2012)
- Wee Boon Hup (2012 - 2016)
- Chong Chin Chung (2016 - 2020)
- Gordon Wong Cheong Weng (2020-2024)
- Philip Lim (2024-)

== Annual conferences ==
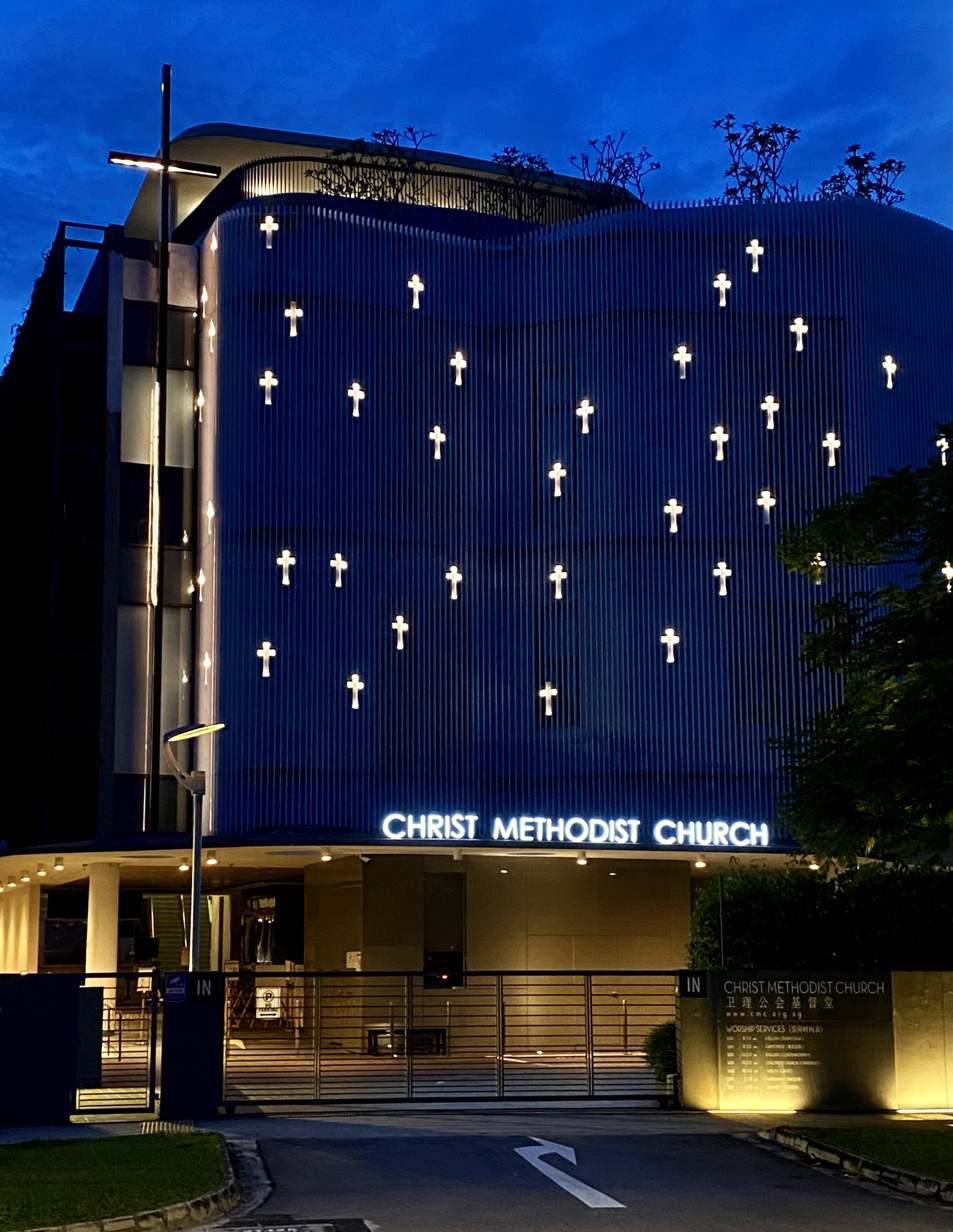
Christ Methodist Church was established in 1930. It is situated along East Coast Road.

The Methodist Church in Singapore is organised into three branches called "Annual Conferences" as each of them meets once a year. These are the Chinese Annual Conference comprising churches with largely Chinese-speaking congregations, Emmanuel Tamil Annual Conference for churches with largely Tamil-speaking congregations and Trinity Annual Conference for churches with largely English-speaking congregations. However, many churches now conduct services in languages other than the language appropriate to the annual conference that they belong to.

The three Annual Conferences are headed by the bishop. Each of the three Annual Conferences is headed by a president.

== List of Methodist churches in Singapore ==
=== Chinese Annual Conference ===
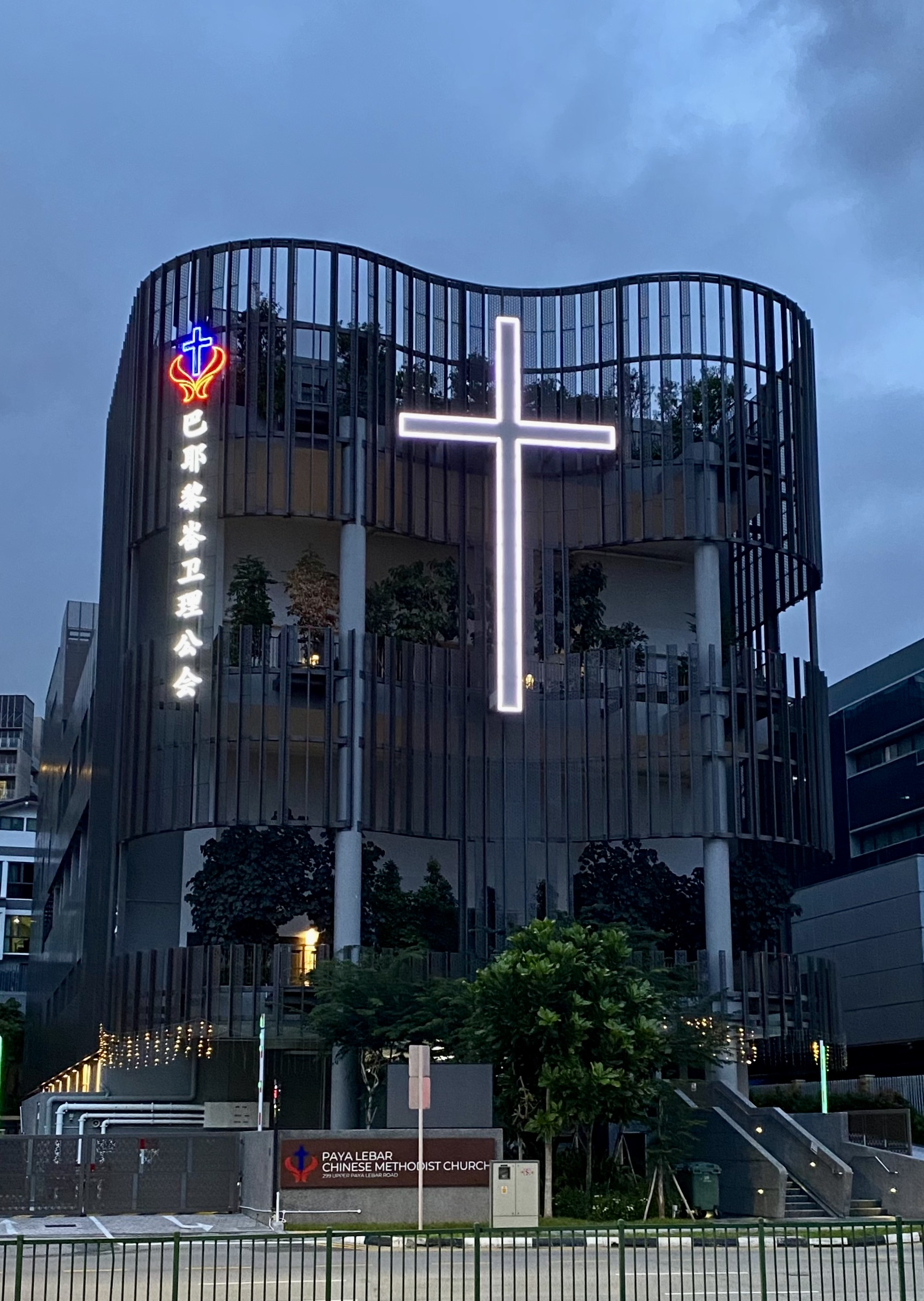
Paya Lebar Chinese Methodist Church began in 1939. It is at 299 Upper Paya Lebar Road.

  - Ang Mo Kio Methodist Church
  - Bukit Panjang Methodist Church
  - Changi Methodist Church
  - Charis Methodist Church
  - Foochow Methodist Church
  - Geylang Chinese Methodist Church
  - Grace Methodist Church
  - Hakka Methodist Church
  - HingHwa Methodist Church
  - Holy Covenant Methodist Church
  - Kum Yan Methodist Church
    - Kum Yan Methodist Church (Woodlands)
  - Paya Lebar Chinese Methodist Church
    - Paya Lebar Methodist Mission

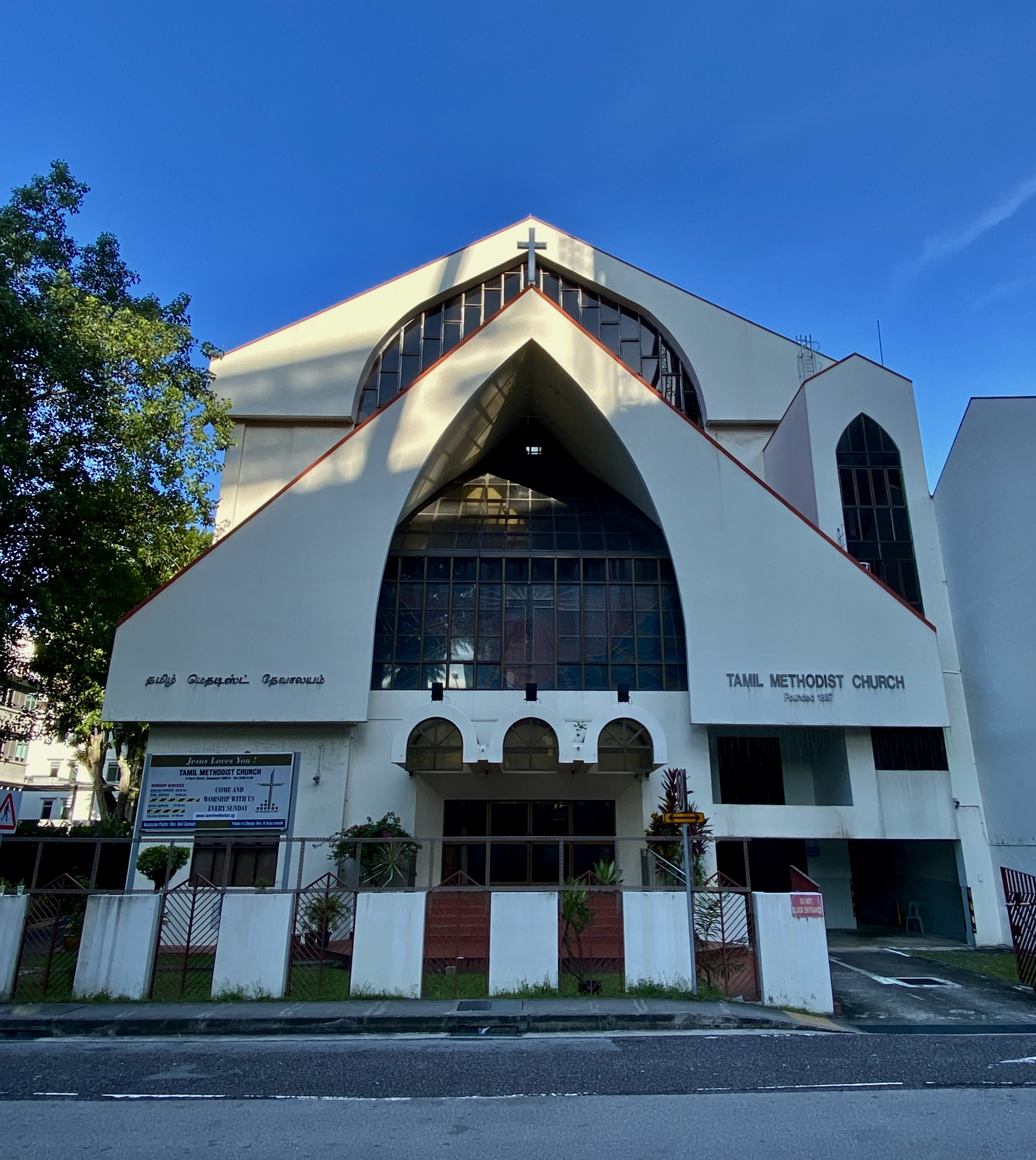
The Tamil Methodist Church was founded in 1887. It is located on Short Street.

  - Queenstown Chinese Methodist Church
  - Sengkang Methodist Church
  - Telok Ayer Chinese Methodist Church
  - Toa Payoh Chinese Methodist Church
  - Yishun Methodist Mission

=== Emmanuel Tamil Annual Conference ===
  - Ang Mo Kio Tamil Methodist Church
  - Jurong Tamil Methodist Church
  - Pasir Panjang Tamil Methodist Church
  - Seletar Tamil Methodist Church
    - Bedok Preaching Point
  - Sembawang Tamil Methodist Church
  - Singapore Telugu Methodist Church
  - Tamil Methodist Church
  - Toa Payoh Tamil Methodist Church

=== Trinity Annual Conference ===
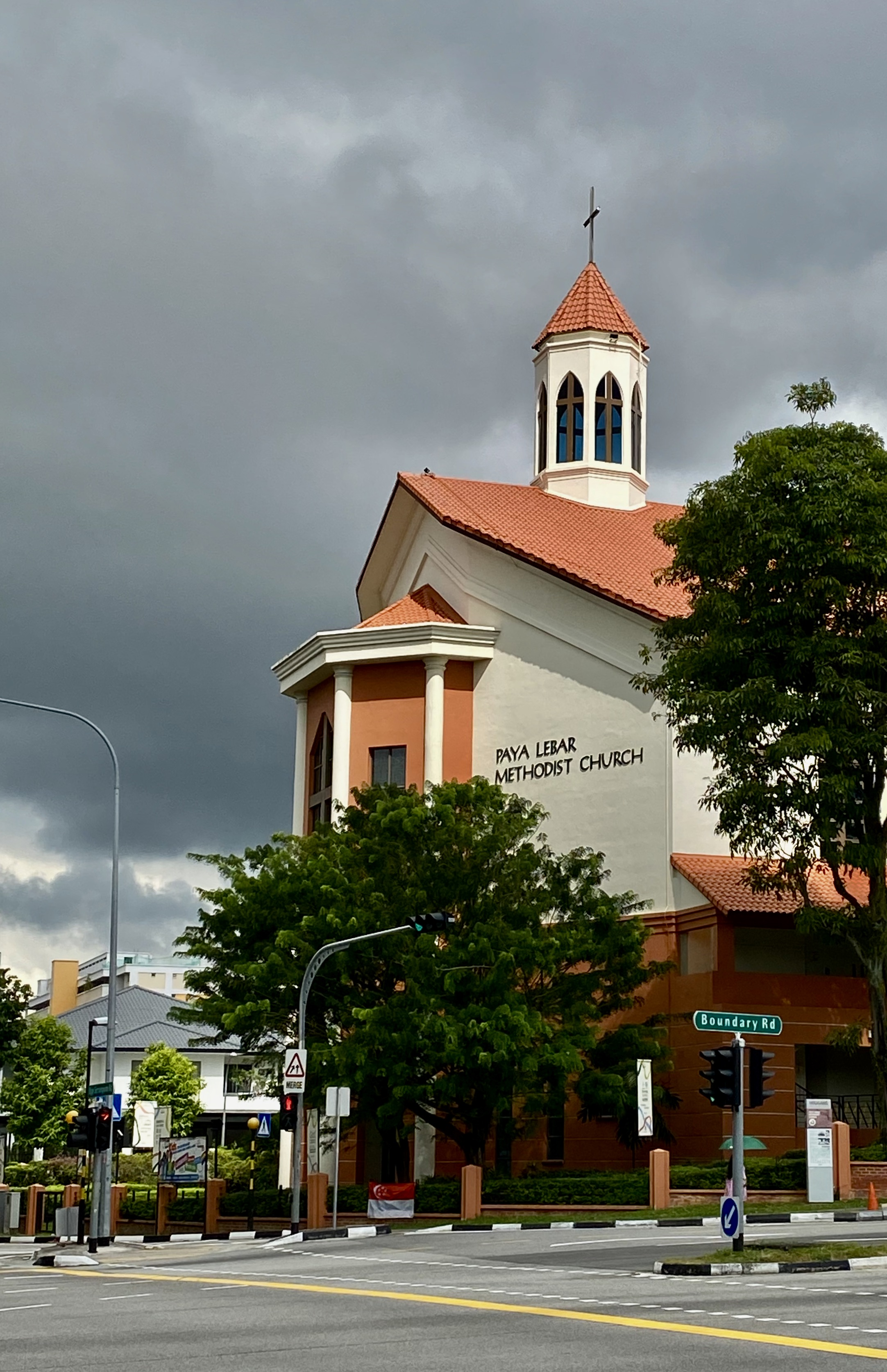
Paya Lebar Methodist Church had its beginning in 1932. It is situated at 5 Boundary Road.

  - Agape Methodist Church
  - Aldersgate Methodist Church
  - Ang Mo Kio Methodist Church
  - Barker Road Methodist Church
    - Bukit Batok Preaching Point
  - Bedok Methodist Church
  - Cairnhill Methodist Church
  - Christ Methodist Church
  - Christalite Methodist Chapel
  - Covenant Community Methodist Church

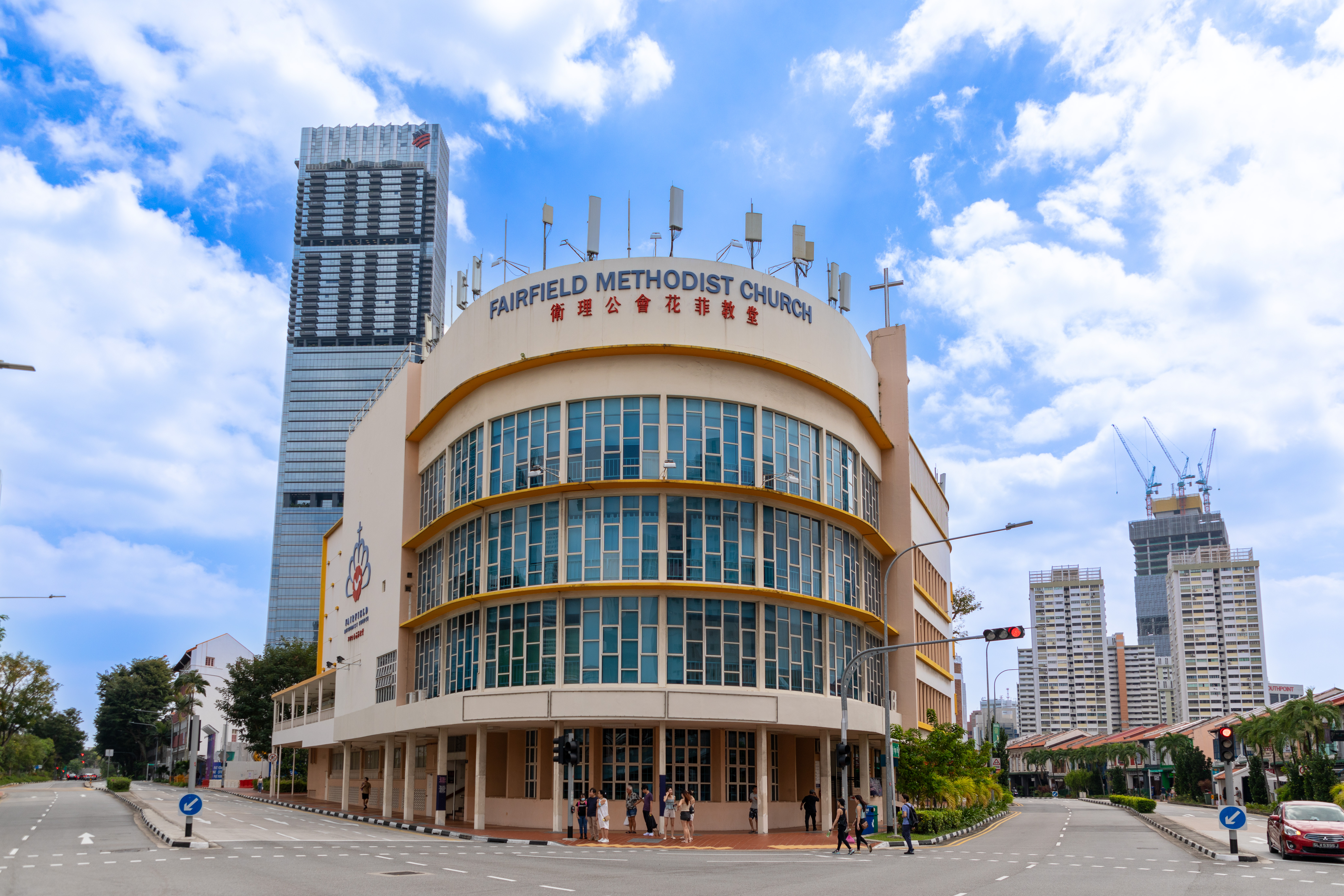
Fairfield Methodist Church in Tanjong Pagar

  - Fairfield Methodist Church
    - Fairfield Preaching Point
  - Faith Methodist Church
  - Holland Village Methodist Church
  - Kampong Kapor Methodist Church
  - Living Hope Methodist Church
  - Living Waters Methodist Church
  - The Methodist Church of the Incarnation
  - Paya Lebar Methodist Church
  - Pentecost Methodist Church
  - Toa Payoh Methodist Church
  - Trinity Methodist Church
  - Wesley Methodist Church

== Schools ==
There are 16 schools managed by the Methodist Church, which is represented by the Methodist Schools Foundation.

Six of the schools are part of the Anglo-Chinese School family which includes a junior college.

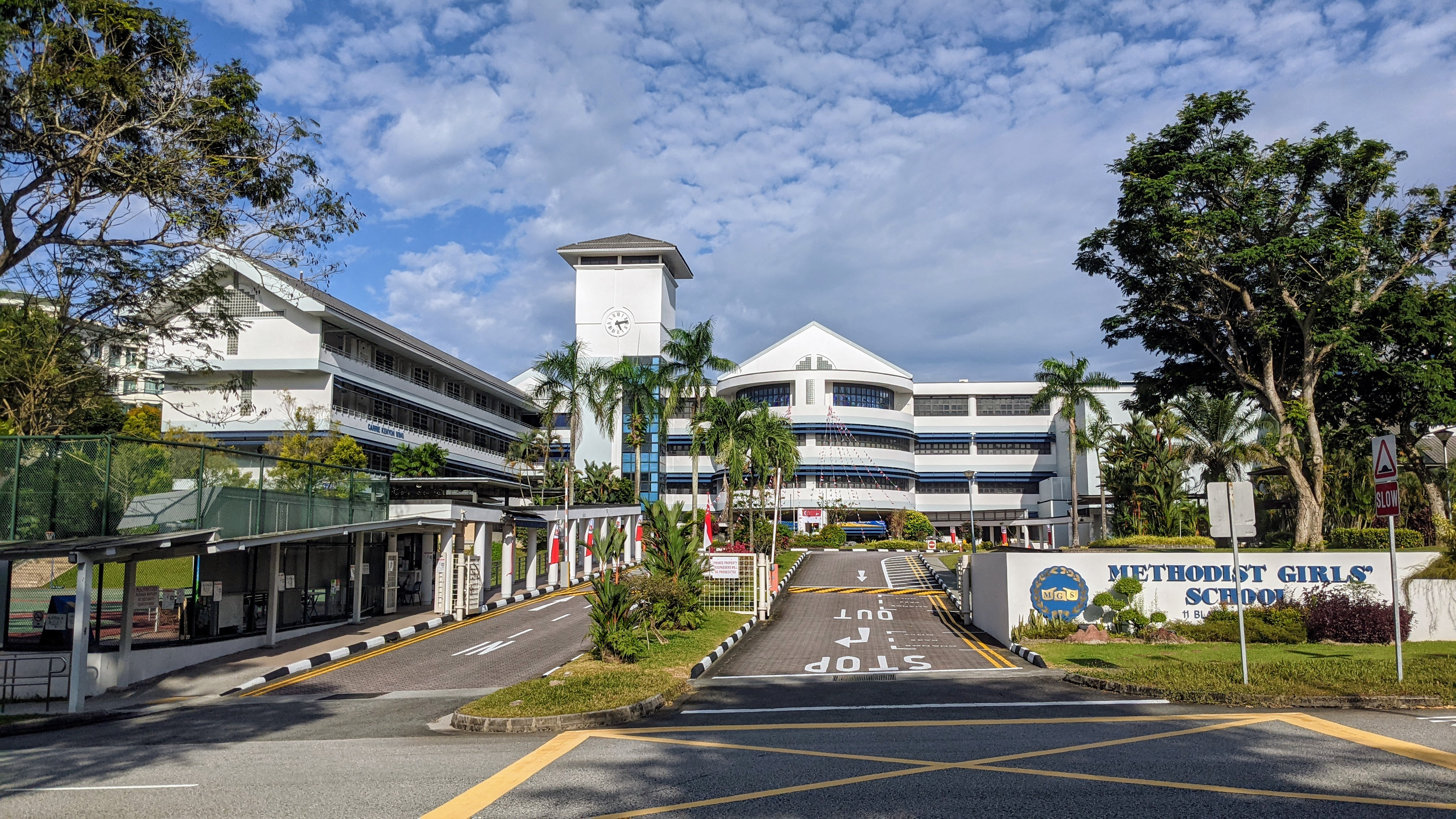
Methodist Girls' School, 11 Blackmore Drive.

The other schools are:

- Methodist Girls' School
- Paya Lebar Methodist Girls' School (Primary)
- Paya Lebar Methodist Girls' School (Secondary)
- Fairfield Methodist School (Primary)
- Fairfield Methodist School (Secondary)
- Geylang Methodist School (Primary)
- Geylang Methodist School (Secondary)

Schools under the ACS family:

- Anglo-Chinese School (Primary)
- Anglo-Chinese School (Junior)
- Anglo-Chinese School (Barker Road)
- Anglo-Chinese School (Independent)
- Anglo-Chinese School (International), Singapore
- Anglo-Chinese Junior College
- ACS Jakarta, Jakarta, Indonesia

Other Methodist Schools:

- St. Francis Methodist School
- Methodist School of Music

== See also ==
- List of bishops of the Methodist Church in Singapore
- Methodism
- Christianity in Singapore
- Religion in Singapore
