= Wesley Church =

Wesley Church may refer to:

- Wesley Church, Melbourne, Australia, a Uniting Church
- Wesley Church, Perth, Australia, a Uniting Church
- Wesley Church, Albany, Australia, a Uniting Church
- Wesley Church, Seremban, Malaysia
- Wesley Church, Egmore, Tamil Nadu, India, a Church of South India church

== See also ==
- Wesley Methodist Church (disambiguation)
- Wesley United Methodist Church (disambiguation)
- Wesley Memorial Church, Oxford, England
- Wesley Methodist Episcopal Church, Delaware, United States
- Wesley Temple AME Church, Akron, Ohio, United States
- Wesley AME Zion Church, Philadelphia, Pennsylvania, United States
- Wesley Brethren Church, Wesley, Texas, United States
