= Wesley Methodist Church =

Wesley Methodist Church may refer to:

in Canada

- Wesley Methodist Church, merged with others to form Wesley Mimico United Church, Toronto

in Singapore

- Wesley Methodist Church, Singapore

in the United States

- Wesley Methodist Church (Kentucky), listed on the National Register of Historic Places (NRHP)
- Wesley Methodist Church (Salem, Massachusetts), NRHP-listed
- Wesley Methodist Church, of the Wesley Methodist Church Historic District, Greenwood, Mississippi, NRHP-listed in Leflore County
- Wesley Methodist Church (Columbia, South Carolina), NRHP-listed

== See also ==
- Wesley Church (disambiguation)
- List of Methodist churches, including numerous close variations in name of church
