= McClellandville, Delaware =

Unincorporated community in Delaware, United States

- Unincorporated community
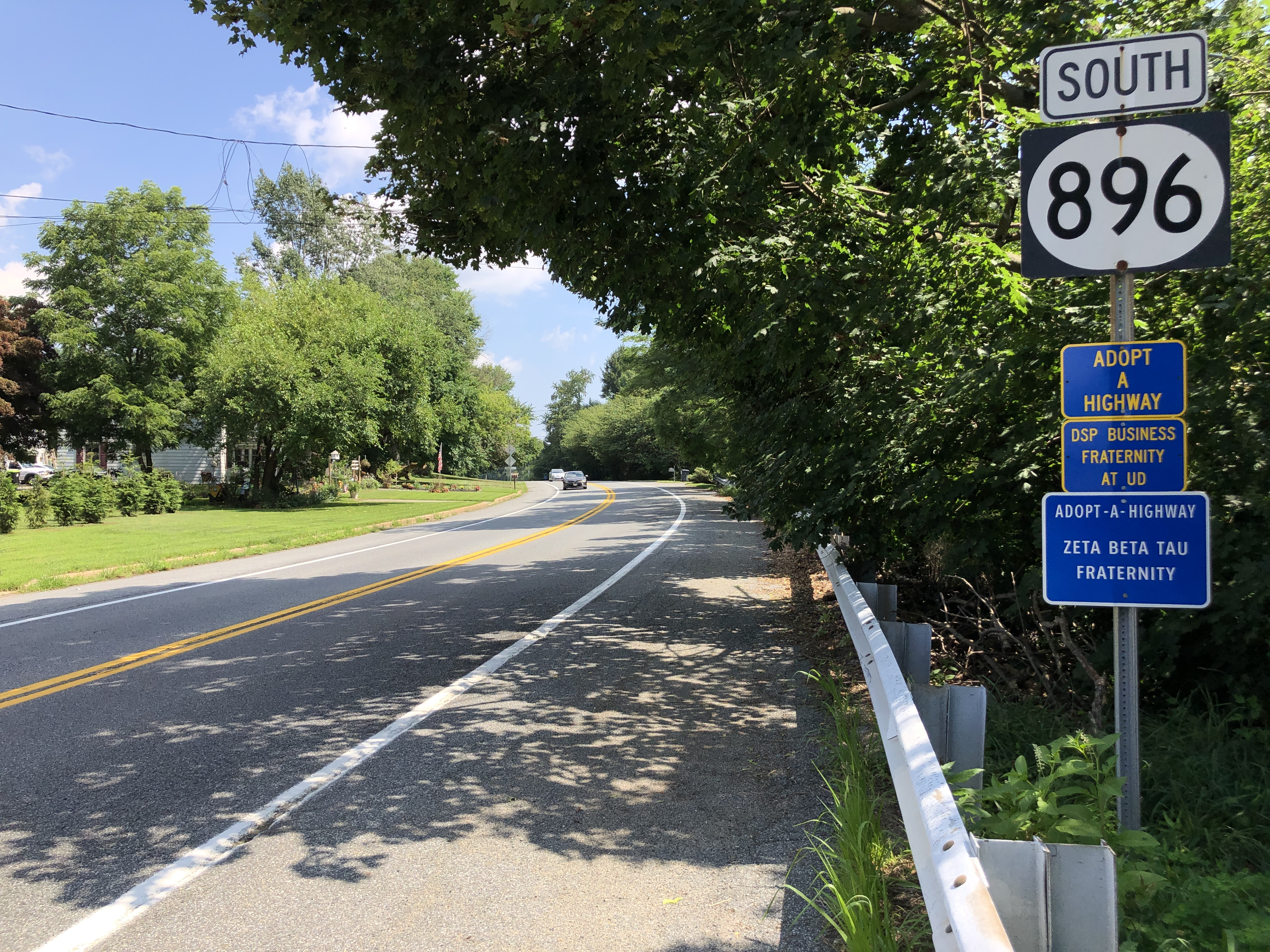

- Location within Delaware Location within the United States
- Coordinates: 39°42′34″N 75°46′37″W
- Country: United States
- State: Delaware
- County: New Castle
- Elevation: 289 ft (88 m)
- Time zone: UTC-5 (Eastern (EST))
  - Summer (DST): UTC-4 (EDT)
- Area code: 302
- GNIS feature ID: 214287

McClellandville is an unincorporated community in New Castle County, in the U.S. state of Delaware. McClellandville is located at the intersection of Delaware Route 896 and Wedgewood Road, northwest of Newark.

== History ==
A post office called McClellandville was established in 1853, and remained in operation until 1908. The community was named for William McClelland, a pioneer settler.

McClellandville contains two properties listed on the National Register of Historic Places: the Samuel Lindsey House and the Wesley M.E. Church.

== Education ==
Previously McClellandville was in the Newark School District.

Today, public schools serving McClellandville are managed by New Castle County, though zoning shifts mean many students now attend schools associated with the Colonial School District, Christina School District, or the Red Clay Consolidated School District. Precise assignment depends on parcel address and local boundary definitions.

Here are some local schools within reasonable proximity (around New Castle):

Calvin R. McCullough Middle School (Grades 6–8) – located in New Castle, part of the Colonial School District.

Bedford (Gunning) Middle School, Castle Hills Elementary, among several other Colonial District schools, serve the area as per Census-based locators.

Other districts (Christina and Red Clay) may include schools like:

R. Elisabeth Maclary Elementary (Christina School District).

John Dickinson School, a Red Clay secondary school with an IB program.

Students in New Castle County — including those from McClellandville — can opt into New Castle County Vocational-Technical School District programs (e.g., Delcastle, Hodgson, Howard, and St. Georges Tech), offering 41 CTE tracks, dual enrollment, and industry credentials.

Nearby flagship: Delcastle Technical High School in Newport (1417 Newport Rd), serving 1,598 students across Grades 9–12.

K–12 education for McClellandville is now part of New Castle County's patchwork of districts — Colonial, with possible overlap by Christina or Red Clay.

Middle and elementary schools within New Castle County are accessible, alongside vocational‑technical high school options.
