= Telok Ayer Chinese Methodist Church =

Church in Singapore

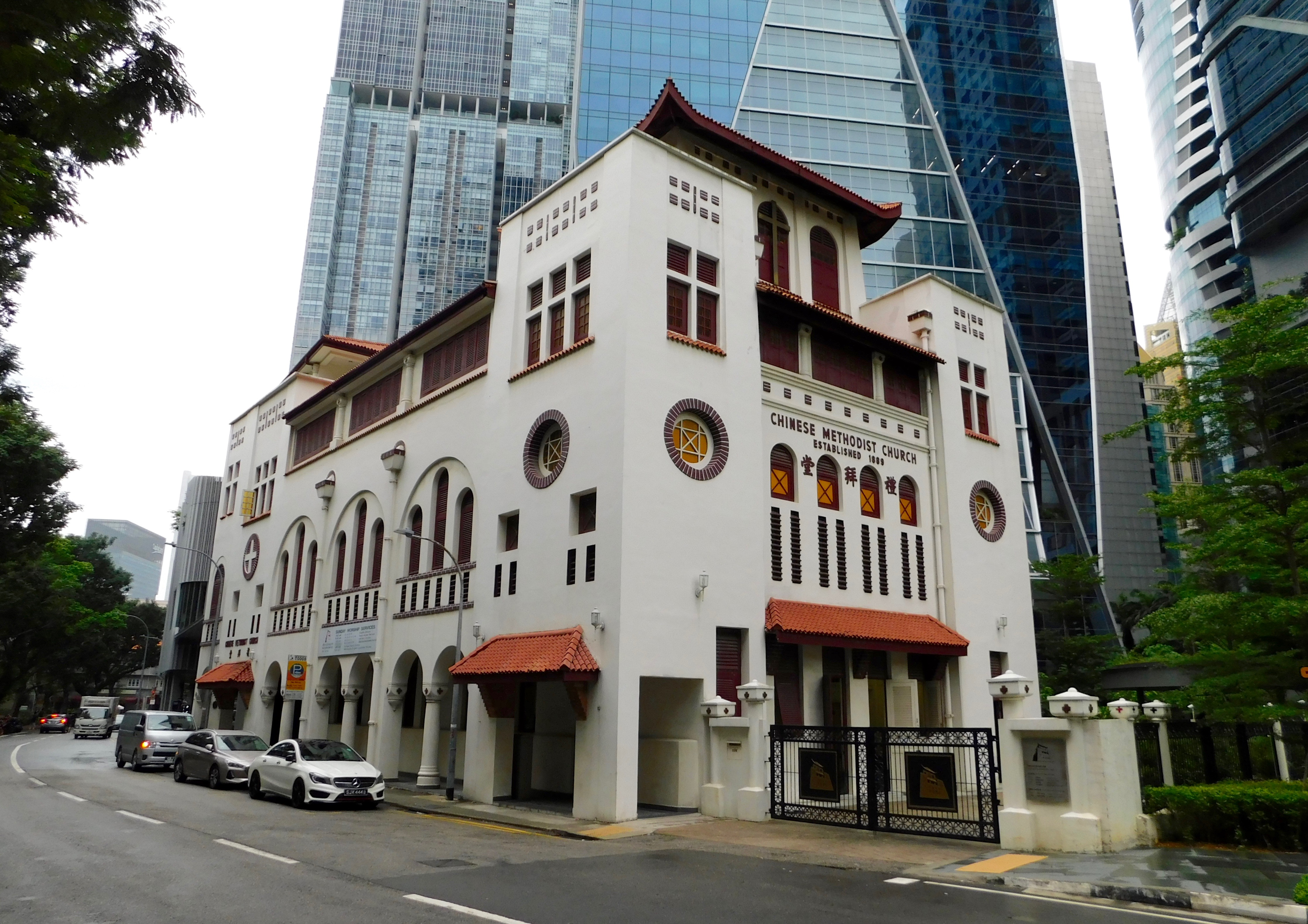
- Church view from Telok Ayer Street

- Location within Singapore
- 1°16′42.49″N 103°50′49.20″E
- Location: 235 Telok Ayer Street; Singapore 068656
- Country: Singapore
- Denomination: Methodist
- Website: www.tacmc.org.sg

History
- Former names: Hokkien Church; Telok Ayer Church; Chinese Methodist Church
- Founded: 1889; 137 years ago
- Founder: Dr. Benjamin F. West

Architecture
- Functional status: Active
- Heritage designation: National Monument
- Designated: 1989; 37 years ago
- Architect: Swan and Maclaren

National monument of Singapore
- Designated: 23 March 1989; 37 years ago
- Reference no.: 21

Telok Ayer Chinese Methodist Church (Abbreviation: TACMC), (Chinese: 卫理公会直落亚逸礼拜堂) is located on Telok Ayer Street within the Downtown Core of Singapore's central business district. The church is approximately 450 metres from Telok Ayer MRT station.

Founded in 1889, TACMC is the first Chinese Methodist Church to be established in Singapore. It has stood on Telok Ayer Street for more than a hundred years.

TACMC is presently affiliated to the Chinese Annual Conference of the Methodist Church in Singapore. The church was gazetted a national monument by Singapore's Urban Redevelopment Authority on 23 March 1989.

== History ==
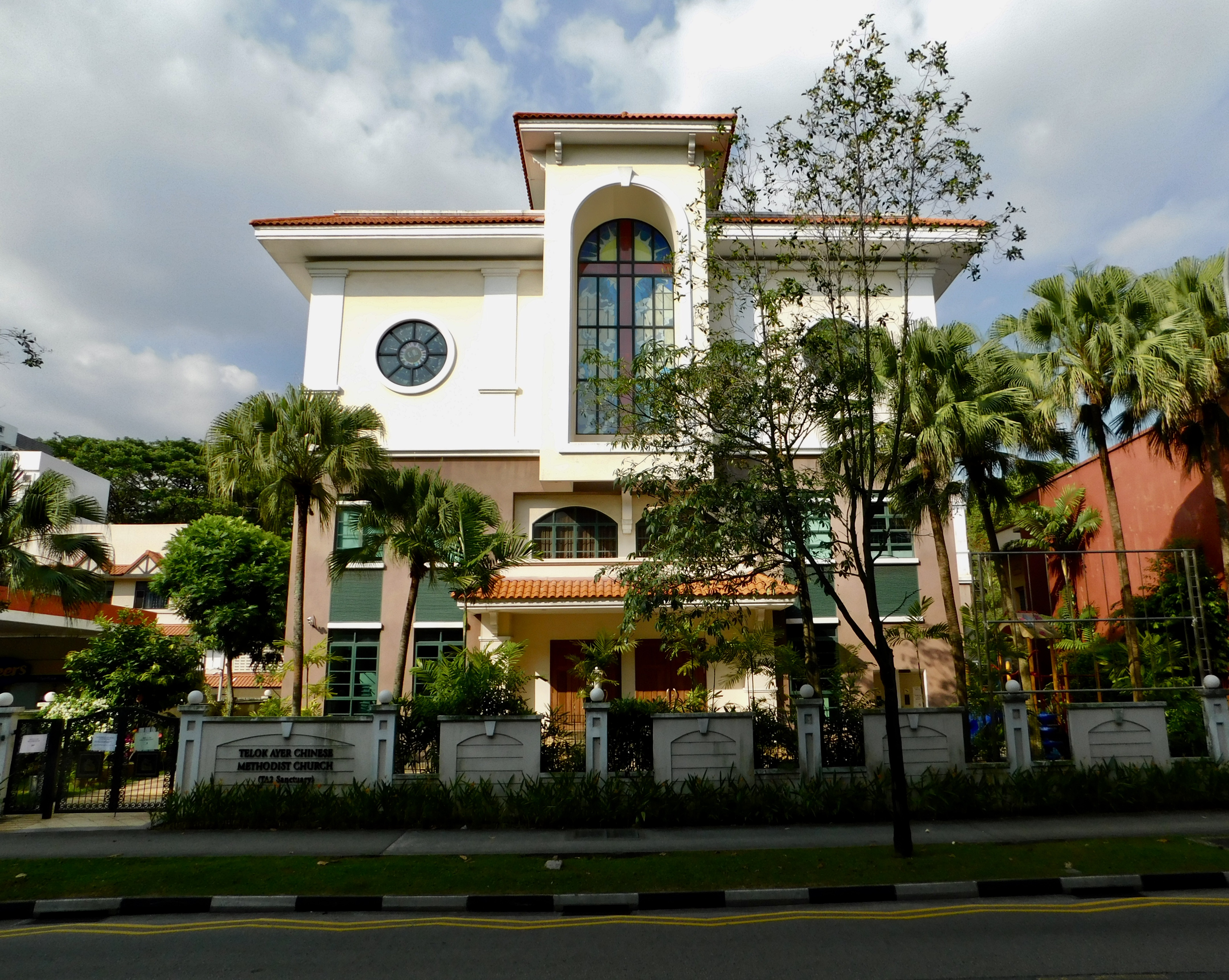
Telok Ayer Chinese Methodist Church (TA2 Sanctuary) on Telok Blangah Road, Singapore.

Telok Ayer Chinese Methodist Church was founded by Dr. Benjamin F. West in 1889.

The church later underwent restoration works which started in October 1993 and were completed in August 1995 at a cost of S$3 million. Telok Ayer Chinese Methodist Church later built a branch church on Wishart Road, off Telok Blangah Road. The new building, with an 800-seat auditorium, was completed in 2004 and it is presently known as Telok Ayer Chinese Methodist Church (TA2 Sanctuary). The church's Chinese and Hokkien services have been conducted at this church since 2005, while English and afternoon Hokkien services are conducted at the main church building on Telok Ayer Street.

The membership of the church now numbers over a thousand, comprising the congregations attending services in Hokkien, Mandarin and English. The church's music programme, which started in 1935, boasts six all-volunteer choirs — three adult, one youth, and two children's choirs. TACMC's Honorary Music Director is Dr. Emilia Wong; the church's senior pastor is Rev. Chua Ooi Suah.

=== Early establishment ===
The Methodist presence in Singapore began with the arrival of the first Methodist missionaries in Singapore, William Oldham and James Thoburn, in 1885. During the initial stage of ministry among the Chinese immigrants in Singapore, beginning from 1885, the locus of the work, particularly among the Hokkiens, was around Telok Ayer Street. This led to the construction of the first Chinese Methodist Church at Telok Ayer Street.

== Architecture ==
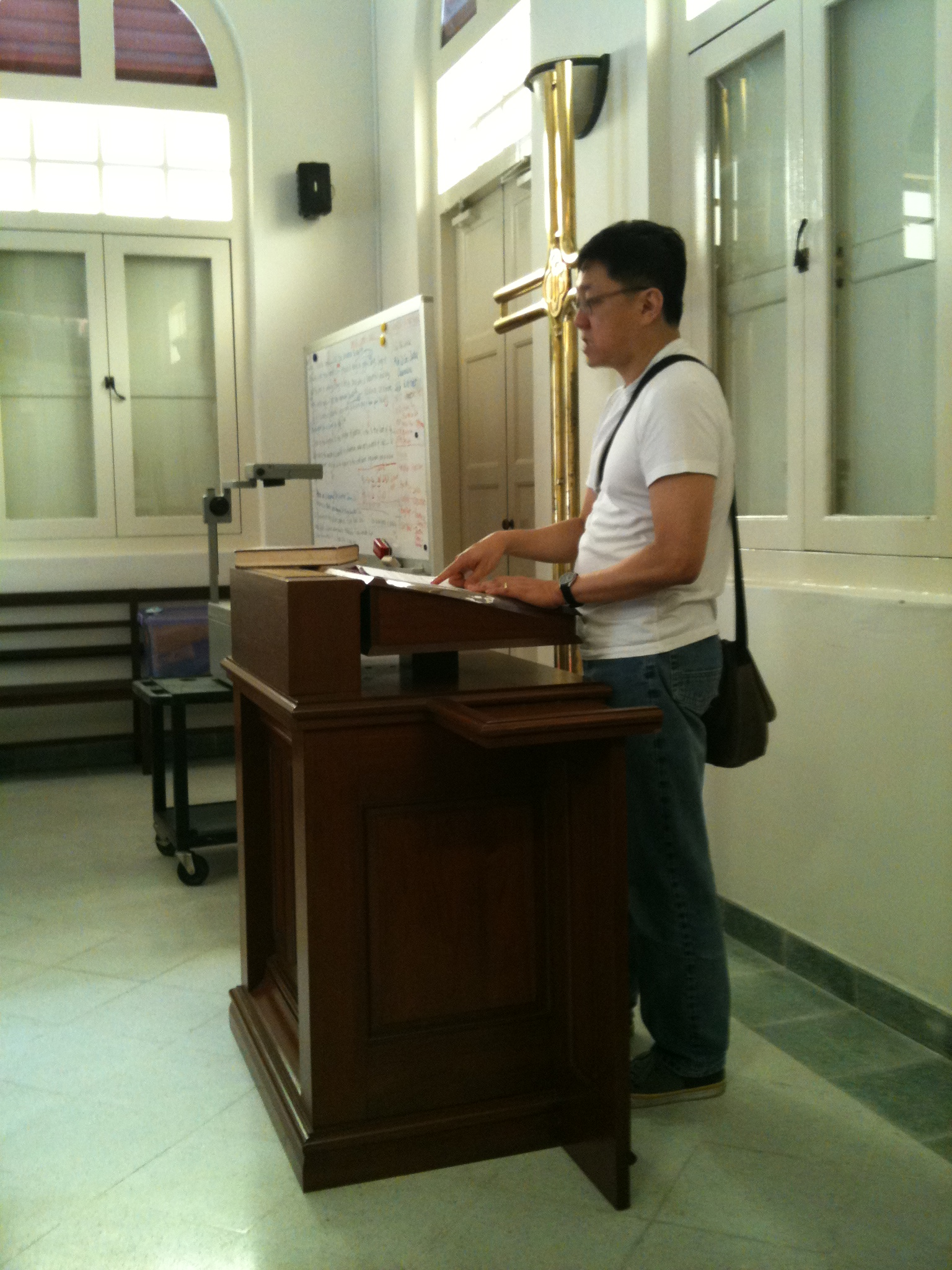
The pulpit used by Dr. John Sung, an evangelist from China, when he conducted revival meetings in the church in 1935.

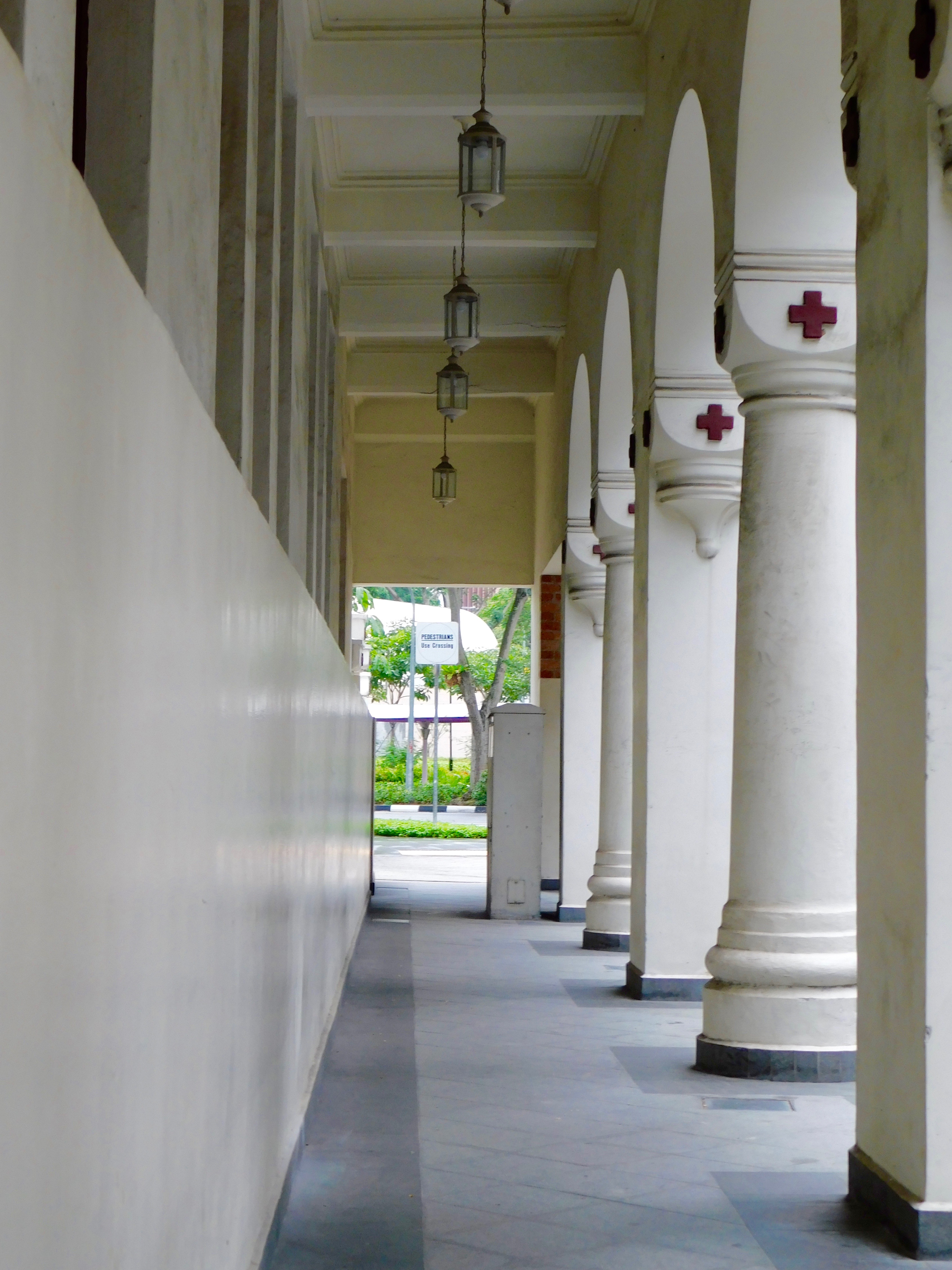
The church has a five foot way on its west side, making the building a part of the surrounding streetscape.

== News articles ==
- "Methodist church a refuge during WWII". The Straits Times (online). 12 August 2016.
- "Six of Singapore's 71 national monuments are on Telok Ayer Street". The New Paper (online). 4 January 2016. Archived from the original on 8 December 2021.
- "Telok Ayer Chinese Methodist Church unearths time capsule 100 years after it was laid". The Straits Times (online). 16 February 2024.

== Video ==
- 直落亚逸礼拜堂的起源和发展 • The Beginning & Development of Telok Ayer Chinese Methodist Church www.YouTube.com
- 直落亚逸堂 • 上帝与我们的故事 TELOK AYER CMC • OUR STORY WITH GOD www.YouTube.com
