= Elsa Andersson (artist) =

Swedish artist

Elsa Maria Karin Andersson (August 17, 1915 – November 16, 1996) was a Swedish artist. She was the daughter of Rudolf Thornberg and Bengta Olsson and in 1939 married Knut Andersson. She was taught decorative painting by her father between 1931 and 1933 while she studied at the teaching school in the city of Malmö. She studied at the Reimann School in Berlin in 1934 and made field trips to Dresden and Berlin. She assisted her father with the decoration of Wesley Church in Limhamn in 1949. Her easel art consist of watercolors and pastel paintings.
