= Robert M. Solomon =

Singaporean Methodist bishop

Robert M. Solomon is a former bishop of the Methodist Church in Singapore, serving from 2000 to 2012. As bishop he was the head of this Christian denomination, which is one of the largest Protestant churches in Singapore. He is an ordained Methodist minister.

== Education ==
Solomon earned an MBBS from the University of Singapore (now National University of Singapore) in 1980, an M.Div. (summa cum laude) from Asian Theological Seminary in 1984, an M.I.S. (Hons) (Intercultural Studies) from Alliance Biblical Seminary in 1984, and a Ph.D. in pastoral theology from the University of Edinburgh in 1993.

== Career ==
Solomon has worked as a medical doctor and church pastor. He was a principal of Trinity Theological College, Singapore. He was first elected bishop in 2000 and re-elected in 2004 and 2008, whilst ending his full quadrennial thrice elected term in 2012 (serving a total of 12 years). As of 2005 he was also vice president of the National Council of Churches of Singapore.

== Works ==
He has spoken and taught ministry in many countries. He has also contributed many articles to books, theological dictionaries and journals and authored numerous books, including The Race, The Conscience, The Enduring Word, The Virtuous Life and The Sermon of Jesus.

His recent releases include:

2024: My Suffering Servant: Facing Life's Mysteries and Finding God's Presence in Job

In the Beginning: Tracing the Gospel Story in Genesis

2023 : The Book of Revelations: Encouragement For Troubled Times

The Reformation : The Thoughts, Lives and Legacy of the Reformers

2022 : Practical Christianity: The Book of James and Its Relevance Today

The Living Stories Of Jesus: Interpreting and Applying the Parables

Apprenticed To Jesus: Learning From Him, Living Like Him

Publications in earlier years include the following:

- Solomon, Robert M. (1994). The hurting heart : overcoming emotional distress. Soo Meng Ko, Yun Chin Lim. Singapore: Armour Pub. ISBN 981-00-5818-7. OCLC 52217780.
- Solomon, Robert M. (2006). Faith & fiction : the fallacy of The Da Vinci code and the facts of Christianity. Singapore: Genesis Books. ISBN 981-4138-67-3. OCLC 123766581.
- Solomon, Robert M (2002). Fire for the journey: reflections for a God-guided life. Singapore: Genesis Books. ISBN 978-981-4045-19-3. OCLC 225994104.
- Solomon, Robert M. (2005). A feast for the soul : growing in holiness. Singapore: Genesis Books. ISBN 981-4138-46-0. OCLC 123766579.
- Solomon, Robert M. (2008). The race : finding the real journey in life. Singapore: Genesis Books. ISBN 978-981-4222-63-1. OCLC 244139192.
- Solomon, Robert M. (2009). Following Jesus in a fallen world. Singapore: Genesis Books. ISBN 978-981-4222-78-5. OCLC 291102135.
- Solomon, Robert M. (2009). Following Jesus in a fallen world. Singapore: Genesis Books. ISBN 978-981-4222-78-5. OCLC 291102135.
- Solomon, Robert M. (2009). The prayer of Jesus : the Lord's prayer in daily life. Singapore: Genesis Books. ISBN 978-981-4270-10-6. OCLC 477082099.
- Solomon, Robert M. (2011). Reflections on Christmas. Singapore: Genesis Books. ISBN 978-981-4305-24-2. OCLC 671601673.
- Solomon, Robert M. (2010). The conscience : rediscovering the inner compass. Singapore: Genesis Books. ISBN 978-981-4305-05-1. OCLC 641441822.
- Solomon, Robert M. (2011). The enduring word : the authority and reliability of the Bible. Bible Society of Singapore. Singapore: Genesis Books. ISBN 978-981-4305-46-4. OCLC 732766991.
- Solomon, Robert M. (2012). The virtuous life : cultivating the fruit of the spirit. Singapore: Genesis Books. ISBN 978-981-4305-95-2. OCLC 794708442.
- Solomon, Robert M. (2012). Reflections on time & eternity. Singapore: Genesis Books. ISBN 978-981-4413-64-0. OCLC 808655529.
- Solomon, Robert M. (2013). The sermon of Jesus : the kingdom of God, a Darwinian jungle and a theatrical church. Singapore. ISBN 978-981-4461-66-5. OCLC 845196255.
- Solomon, Robert M. (22 March 2022). Faithful to the End: A Preacher's Exposition of 2 Timothy. Discovery House Publishing. ISBN 978-981-4991-29-2.
- Solomon, Robert M. (2014). Boundless love : why God became a man. Singapore. ISBN 978-981-4597-50-0. OCLC 893203785.
- Solomon, Robert M. (2015). Jesus and his family : portraits from the Bible. Singapore. ISBN 978-981-4668-49-1. OCLC 921873050.

== See also ==
- Methodist Church in Singapore
