= Wesley M.E. Church =

Historic church in Delaware, United States

- U.S. National Register of Historic Places
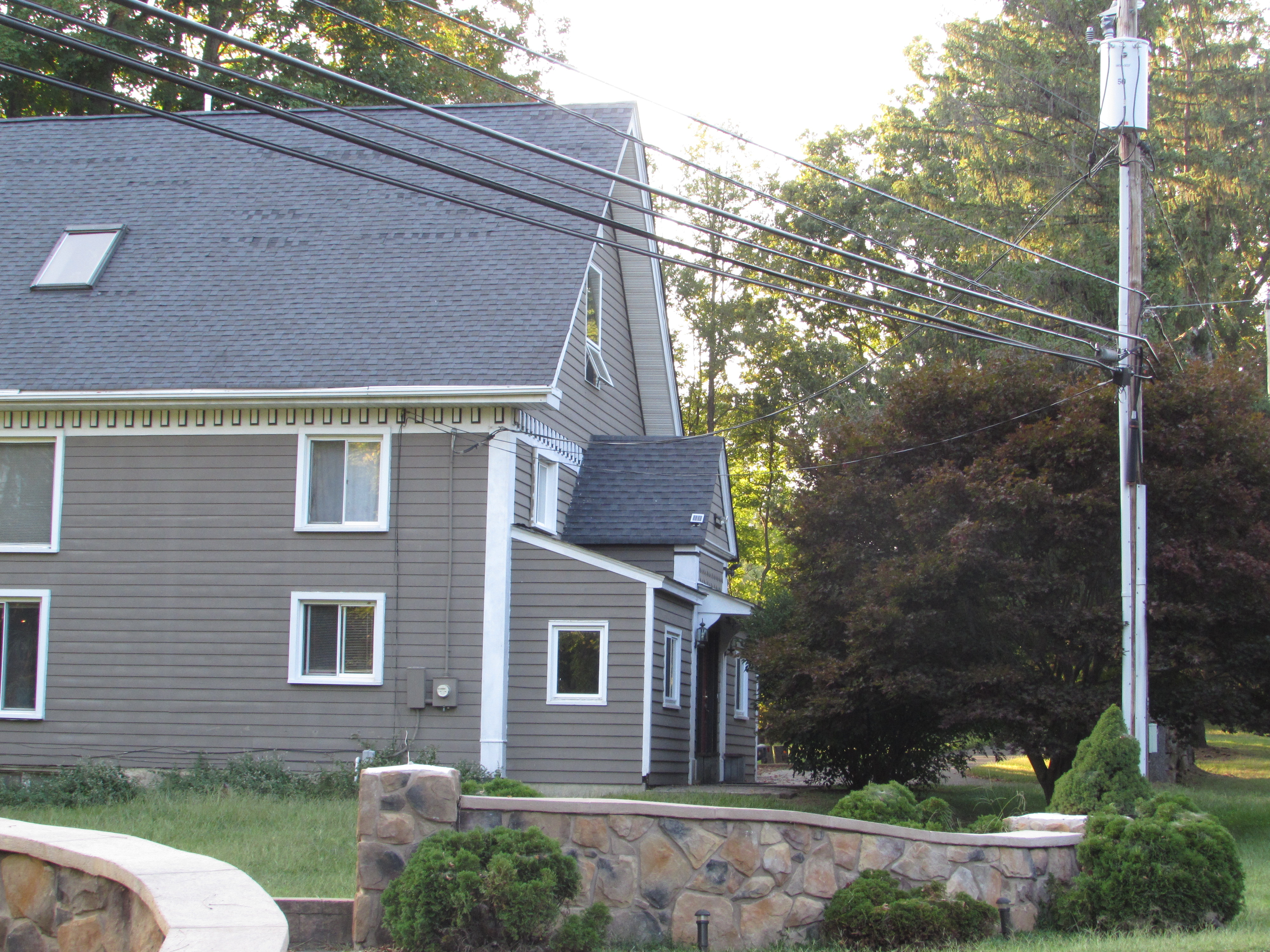
- Side and front of former church in 2015, with most exterior decorative elements except the cornice removed.

- Location within Delaware Location within the United States
- Location: 839 New London Rd., McClellandville, Delaware
- Coordinates: 39.711617°N 75.778896°W
- Area: 0.5 acres (0.20 ha)
- Built: 1854
- Architectural style: Greek Revival
- MPS: White Clay Creek Hundred MRA
- NRHP reference No.: 83001407
- Added to NRHP: August 19, 1983

Wesley Methodist Episcopal Church is a historic Methodist Episcopal church located at McClellandville, New Castle County, Delaware. It was built in 1854, and is a frame, one story, one bay by three bay, gable-roofed Greek Revival-style building. It was sheathed in weatherboard and featured decorative wood shingles on the facade and corner pilasters.

It was added to the National Register of Historic Places in 1983.
