= Wesley Methodist Church, Singapore =

Coordinates: 1°17′53″N 103°50′51″E

Wesley Methodist Church
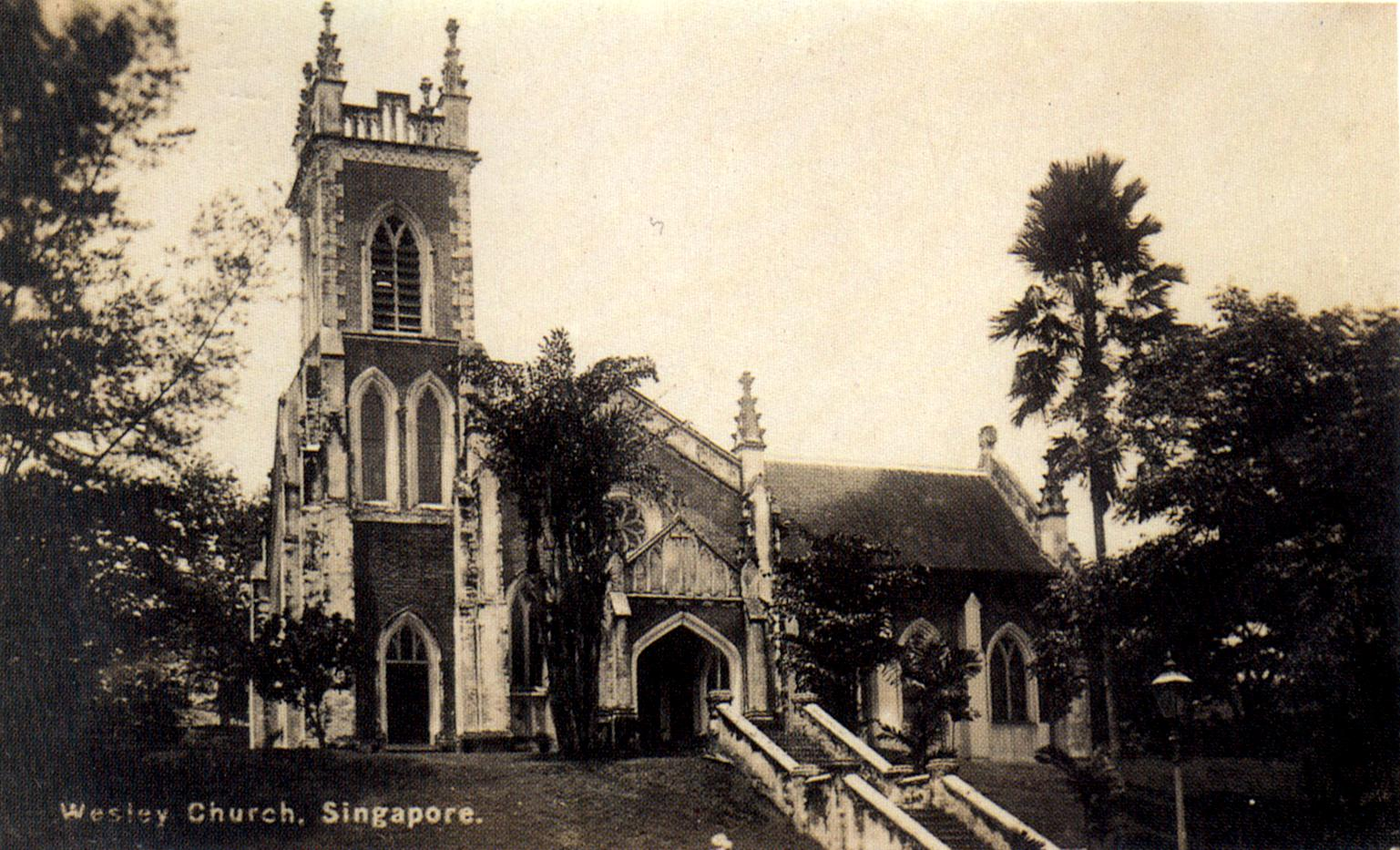
- Wesley Methodist Church, from an old sepia-toned postcard

- Location within Singapore
- Country: Singapore
- Denomination: Methodist
- Website: Official website

History
- Founded: 6 February 1885
- Founder(s): James Mills Thoburn, William Fitzjames Oldham, Marie Oldham, Julia Battie

Administration
- Division: Trinity Annual Conference

Clergy
- Pastor(s): Rev Lim Jen Huat, Rev Lilian Ang, Rev Chia Chin Nam, Rev Gladwin Lee, Rev Adrian Ng, Rev David Ho Seng Han, Rev Benjamin Lau, Rev Clement Ong

Wesley Methodist Church is the oldest Methodist church in Singapore. It is the second Methodist Church to be built in Singapore after the Methodist Episcopal Church at Coleman Street which subsequently became a school hall. It is located in Fort Canning Hill.

== History ==
On 7 February 1885, William Fitzjames Oldham was appointed to head the Methodist Church in Singapore. He arrived with James Mills Thoburn and together they conducted a series of evangelistic rallies in the Town Hall (later the Victoria Memorial Hall) and Sunday evening worship services. The congregation was known as the English Church and met weekly in the Town Hall. Through fundraising and Oldham’s contributions, the first Methodist church in Singapore was built at Coleman Street and dedicated on 15 December 1886, named the Methodist Episcopal Church. Its congregation then mostly consisted of foreigners and English-speaking government officials that were based in Singapore.

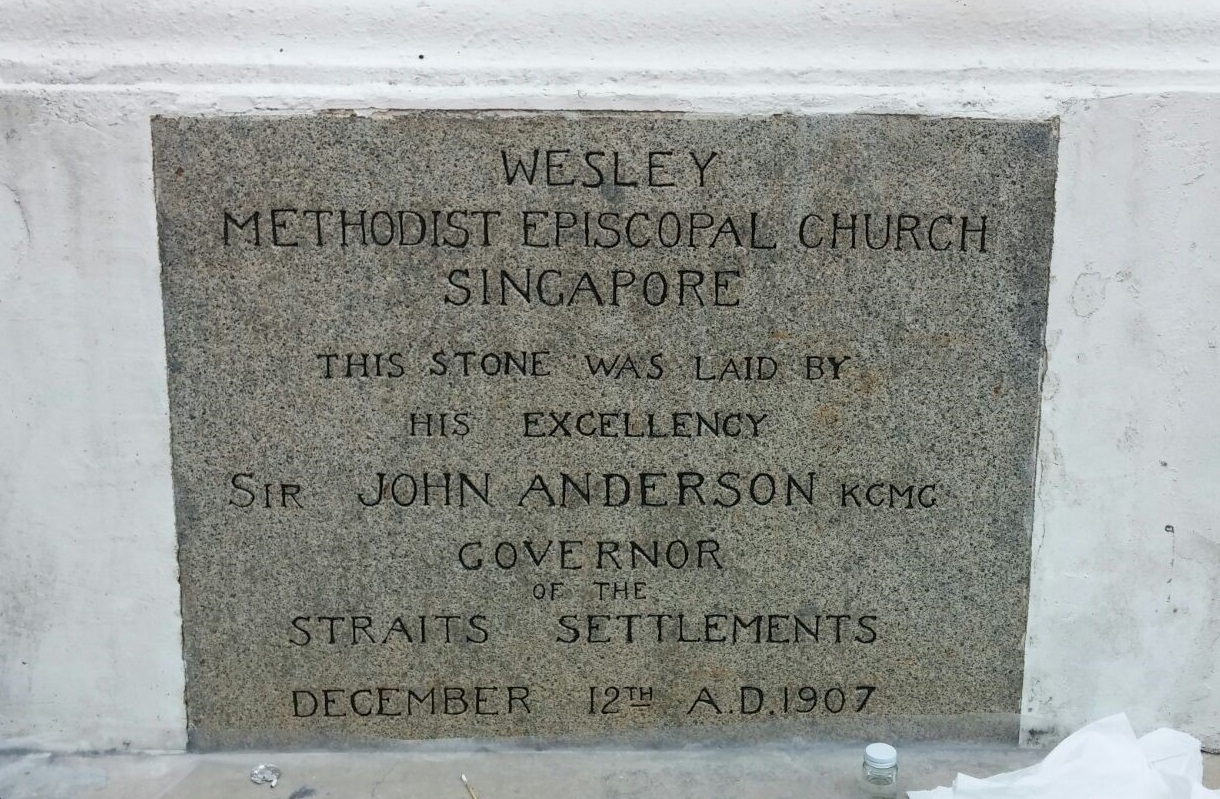
Cornerstone that was laid by the then Governor of the Straits Settlements, Sir John Anderson.

In early 1907, Sir John Anderson, the Governor of the Straits Settlements, granted a 38,000 square foot plot of land at Fort Canning for a church to be erected on a hill, "on the Tanglin side of the Museum". In 1907, the church at Coleman Street was sold to the Anglo-Chinese School (becoming its hall) and money was raised to build a new church. Anderson personally laid the cornerstone with an inscribed silver trowel on 12 December 1907. After completion, the first worship at the new compound was held on 25 December 1908, and formal dedications were done on 4 February 1909 by Bishop William Oldham. It was only on 7 January 1910 that the church was renamed the Wesley Methodist Church after the founder of Methodism, John Wesley.

Around 1929, there was an influx of members to the church, mostly foreign military personnel. With the increase in members, there was a need to expand the church. The Wesley Hall was built and dedicated on 10 April 1927. In 1937, the interior of the church and hall were renovated, where new lights, pulpit, floor tiles and a Hammond electric organ were added.

In 1942, Wesley's growth was interrupted during the Japanese occupation of Singapore in World War II. Her building was stripped and used as an ammunition depot by the Imperial Japanese Army. After the war ended in 1945, the congregation re-formed on 12 September 1945 despite the poor state of the building. Items that survived the war were the stained-glass windows, which had been removed for safekeeping, a badly damaged Hammond organ, donated lanterns and the marble baptismal font. On Easter Day, 16 May 1948, a re-dedication service was held after extensive renovations.

In the mid-1950s, the church saw its first Asian pastor. It was repainted in November 1955, along with a new roadway. An upper room was also constructed in the main church tower for pastors to rest.

In 1977, the church began on an extension programme to improve the sanctuary by installing air-conditioning and increasing its seating capacity. The nave and north end of the transept were extended. However, this compromised on the original cross shape of the building, resulting in an L-shape. In addition, a 4-storey educational block with a concert hall and a 2-level basement carpark was added. The rosettes on the walls were changed, while the rosette in the chancel was preserved. This extension project cost $1.2 million and was completed in October 1979.

In 1982, a baptismal hall was also constructed to add to the Sanctuary, along with basement rooms and a Plaza (Wesley Plaza). On 13 December 1987, a groundbreaking ceremony was held for a new extension, which was later topped off on 26 November 1988. It was dedicated on 9 September 1989 by Bishop Ho Chee Sin, Bishop Emeritus T R Doraisamy and Bishop Emeritus Kao Jih Chung.

To accommodate the large number of worshippers, the church signed a 5-year lease for two floors of office space at the YWCA Fort Canning Lodge.

On 28 September 2010, another upgrading project was implemented with a dedication service to create 36,000 square feet of usable space. With a budget of up to $12.3 million, the upgrading project was finally completed by the end of 2012. A new plaza hall was created on top of the sanctuary extension with a glass canopy to shelter the courtyard from weather. More seats were added and another chapel was constructed in the basement, along with movable partitions for the rooms. Trusses were added to the roof and tiles were replaced. The altar was also reconfigured along with the shift of the main door to align with the nave. Lanterns that were donated by friends of the church in the 1940s were installed at the front of the church. There was also an overhaul for the kitchen in the church.

In 2015, the church began another project to refurbish the sanctuary.

== Architecture ==
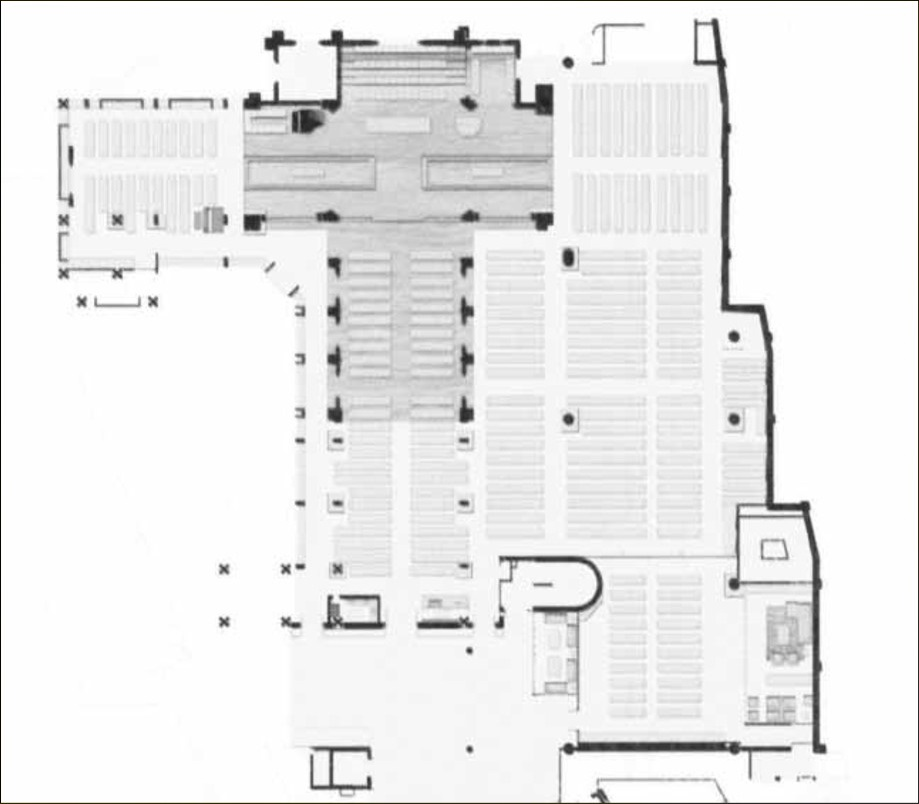
Floor Plan of the Sanctuary with original cross highlighted

The building is in a toned-down Gothic Revival style, built of red brick with tracery and mullion details in white stone or stucco. It was designed by David McLeod Craik of Swan and Maclaren. The interior originally consisted of a nave and two transepts, with a wooden hammerbeam roof. The church was extensively remodelled and extended in 1977 and 1988, doubling the length of the nave. Aisles were also provided by turning the original windows into arched openings and extending the roof. Additional rooms were created in extensions to the transepts, and a new building containing a multi-purpose hall and more rooms constructed beside it. This building was decorated in the same colour scheme as the original church, but with few other similarities. While the capacity of the church was greatly increased, the building lost most of its original façades, as well as much (if not most) of its original exterior appearance. Seemingly oddly-placed gothic finials emerging from the tiled roof indicate where the original façades once were. Although the new construction used the same combination of brick and plaster as the original structure, it is quite utilitarian and lacks the details and grace of the original, both on the exterior and interior. For instance, the new portion of the nave has a plain pitched roof without the carved wooden hammerbeams in the older portion, and the placement of windows and other openings bears no relation to the original structure.

=== Former buildings ===
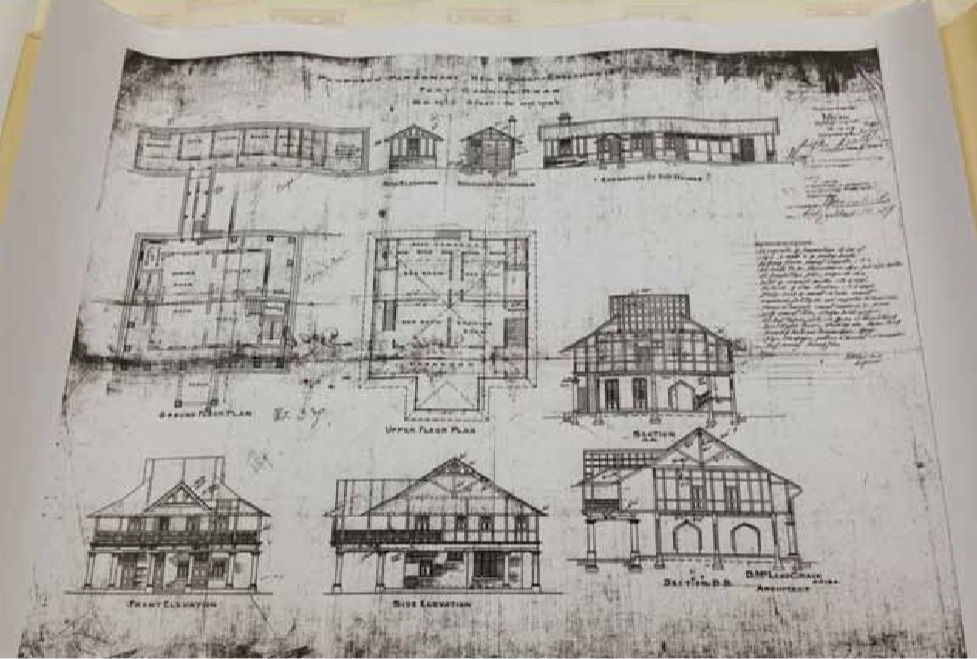
Architecture Drawing of the Fort Canning Church's Parsonage

A parsonage was also located next to the church for the pastor’s family to live in and was designed with a colonial influenced style redesigned to accommodate the tropical climate of Singapore. It also had long columns that extended from the ground floor to the top floors for air circulation, borrowing the concept from traditional Malay buildings.

In 1926, a social hall dubbed the Wesley Hall was built. It was a basic rectangular building adjacent to the church that served its simple purpose of a place for meetings, conferences and concerts. In the 1960s, the Wesley Hall was demolished and a multipurpose hall was built in its place. Bricks and plasterworks were used to integrate the old and new buildings.

== Gallery ==
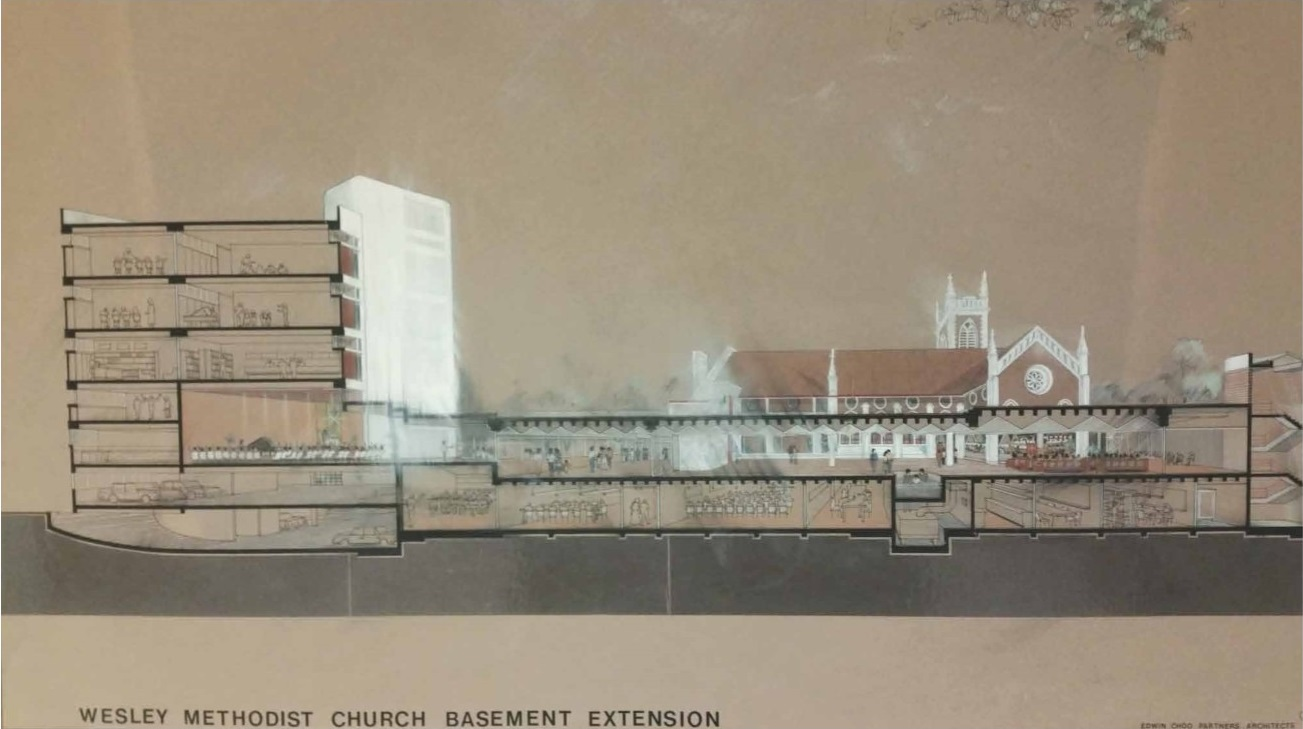
Cross section of the proposed 1977 renovation

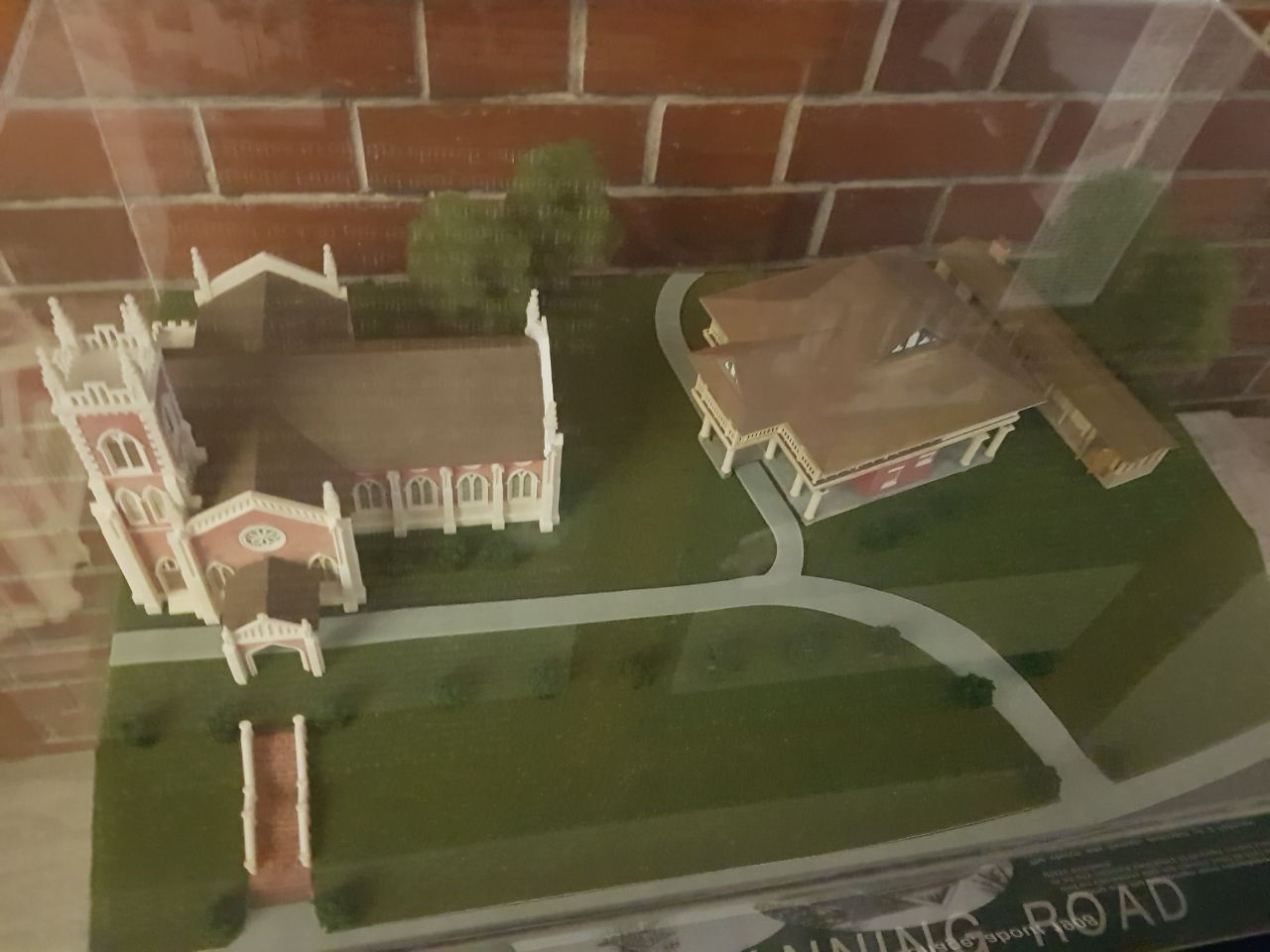
Model of the original church structure

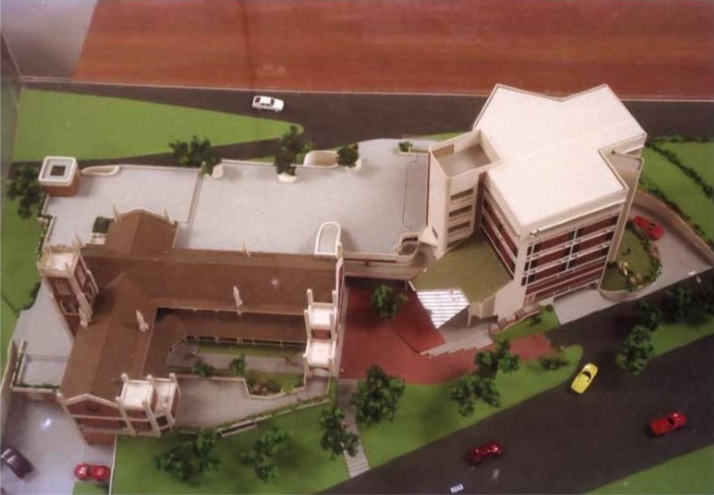
Model of the Wesley Plaza built in 1987
