= Sword of Flame =

Sword of Flame may refer to:

- Sword of Flame, a special weapon featured in the video game Fire Emblem
- Sword of Flame, a 1996 novel in The Artefacts of Power series by Maggie Furey
- Flame-bladed sword, a characteristically undulating style of blade
- Flaming sword (effect), a sword coated with fuel and set on fire for various types of performances
- Flaming sword (mythology), a sword glowing with a flame by some supernatural power

== See also ==
- Flaming sword (disambiguation)
- Fire and sword (disambiguation)
- The Sword and The Flame, a 1979 wargame
