= Flaming sword =

Flaming sword may refer to:

- Flaming sword (mythology), a sword glowing with a flame by some supernatural power
- Flaming sword (effect), a sword coated with fuel and set on fire for various types of performances
- Vriesea splendens or flaming sword, a species of flowering plant
- The Flaming Sword, a publication of the Satanist neo-Nazi group Black Order

== Arts and entertainment ==
- "Flaming Sword", a 1983 song by Care
- The Flaming Sword (1915 film), an American lost silent film
- The Flaming Sword (1958 film), a British film
- The Flaming Sword (novel), a 1939 novel by Thomas Dixon Jr.
- The Flaming Sword, a 1914 novel by George Fort Gibbs; basis for the 1915 film
- Flaming Swords, a 2022 album by Fievel Is Glauque

== See also ==
- Fire and sword (disambiguation)
- Flame-bladed sword, a characteristically undulating style of blade
- Sword of Flame (disambiguation)
- Newton's flaming laser sword, a philosophical razor
