= Fire manipulation =

Fire manipulation may refer to:

- Fire performance, a group of performance arts or skills that involve the manipulation of fire
- Pyrokinesis, a psychic ability allowing a person to create and control fire with the mind
