= Fire performance =

Performance art using fire skills

Video of a fire performance at Webster Hall NYC

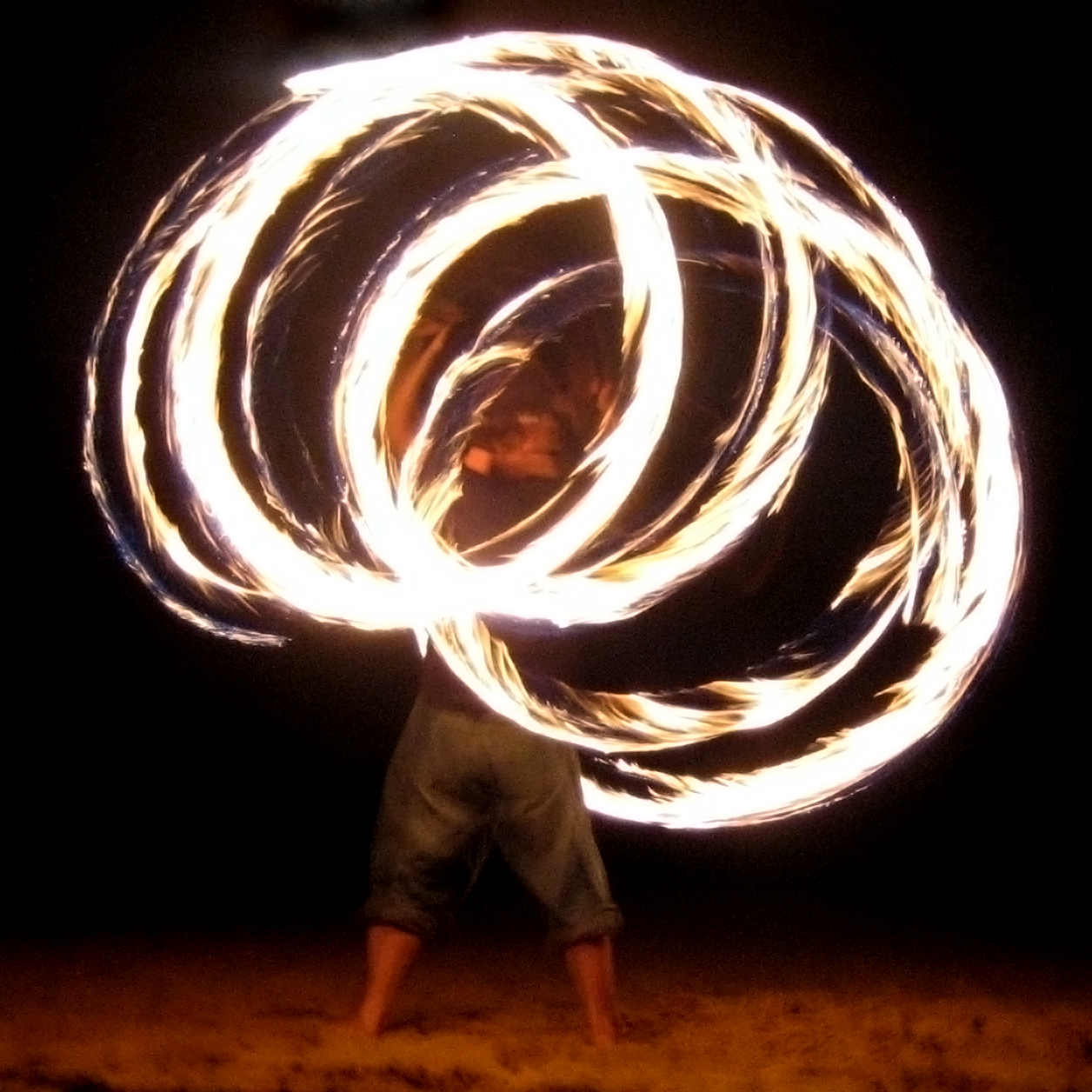
A fire twirler with staff

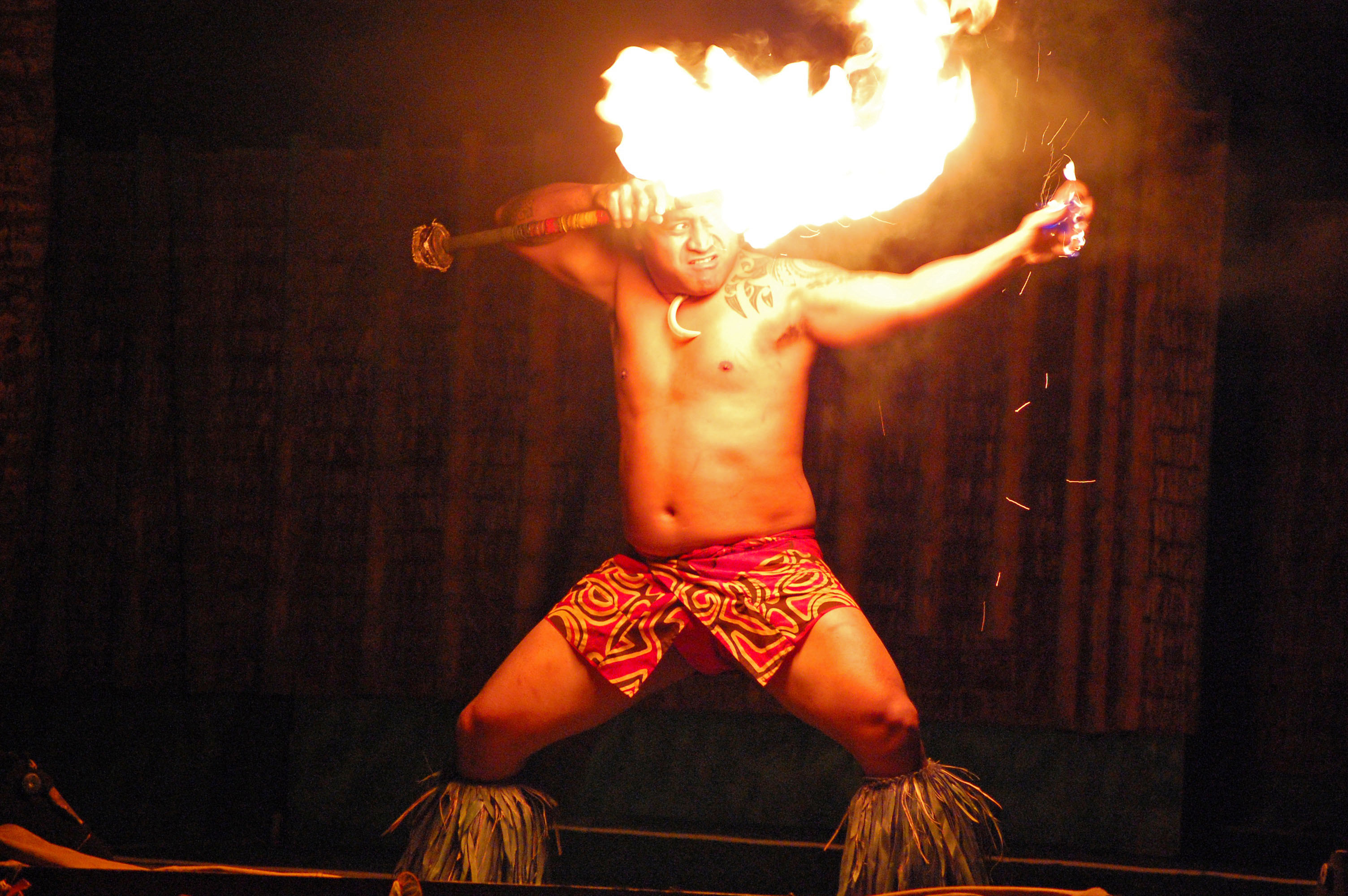
A fireknife performer with a fire knife

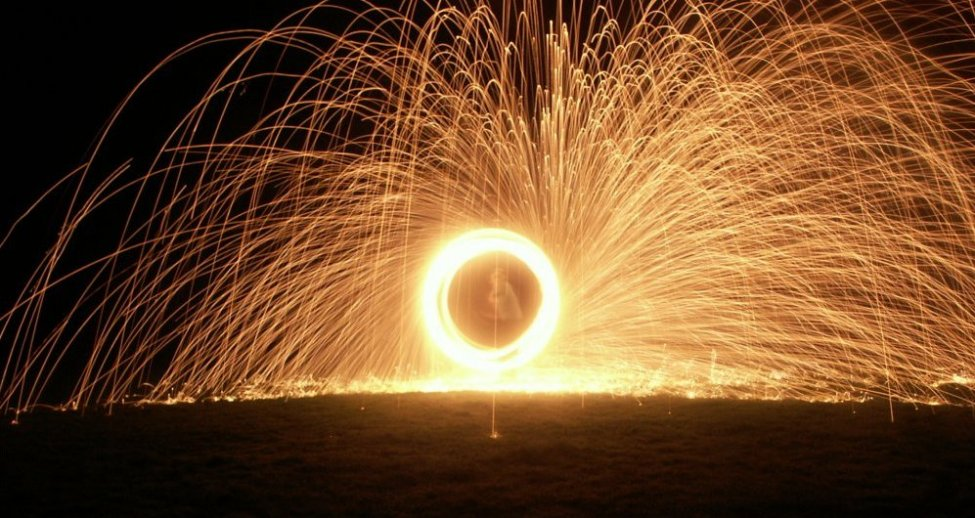
A fire performers spinning poi consisting of lit wire wool in chicken wire cages, dipped first in paraffin. Long-exposure photography captures the trails created by sparks.

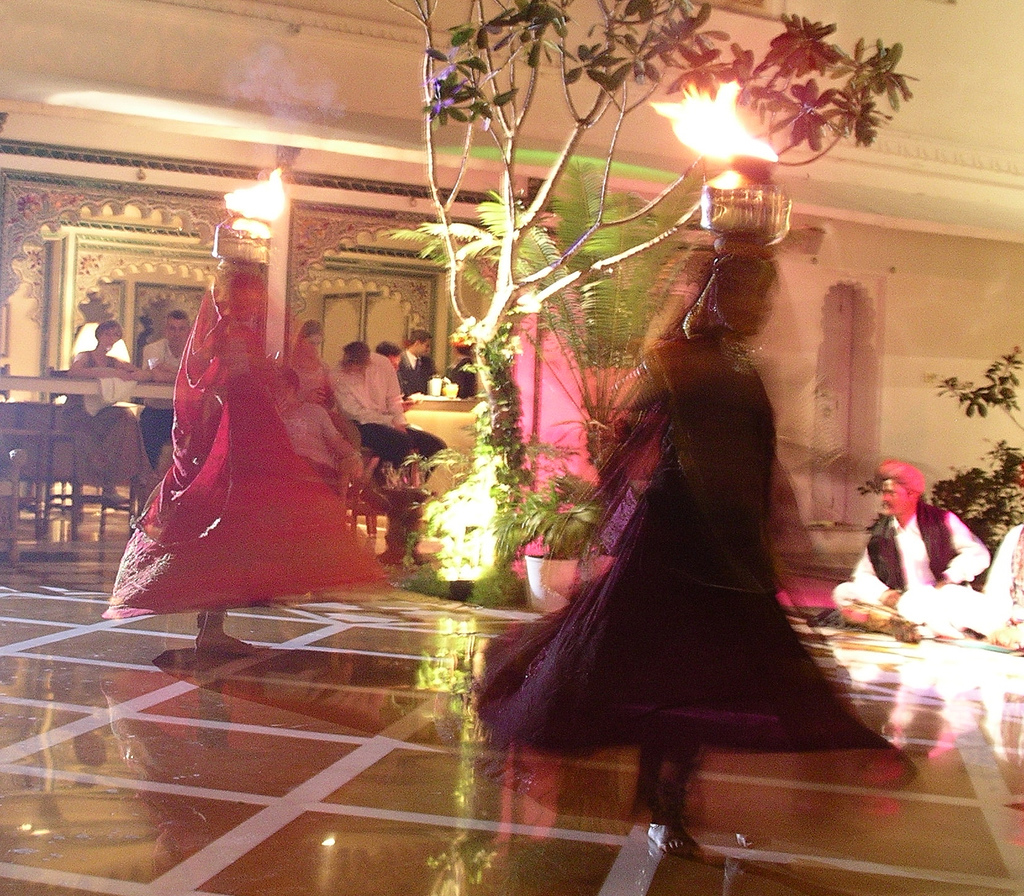
Spinning fire dancers of Udaipur perform traditional dance.

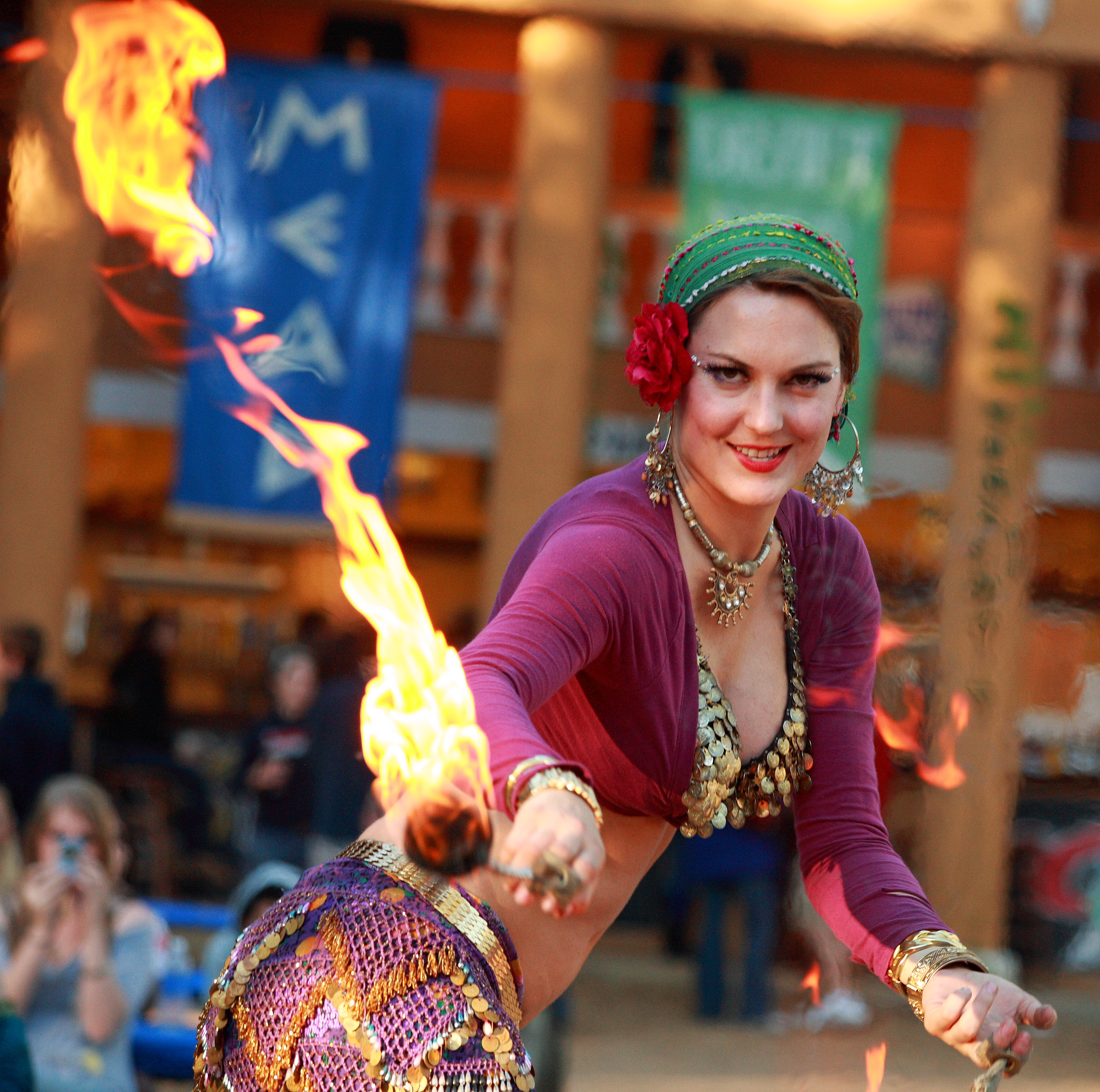
Fire dancer with poi

Fire performance is a group of performance arts or skills that involve the manipulation of fire. Fire performance typically involves equipment or other objects made with one or more wicks which are designed to sustain a large enough flame to create a visual effect.

Fire performance includes skills based on juggling, baton twirling, poi spinning, and other forms of object manipulation. It also includes skills such as fire breathing, fire eating, and body burning; sometimes called fakir skills. Fire performance has various styles of performance including fire dancing; the use of fire as a finale in an otherwise non-fire performance; and the use of fire skills as 'dangerous' stunts. Performances can be done as choreographed routines to music (this type being related to dance or rhythmic gymnastics); as freestyle (performed to music or not) performances; or performed with vocal interaction with the audience. Some aspect of fire performance can be found in a wide variety of cultural traditions and rituals from around the world.

Any performance involving fire carries inherent danger and risks, and experts generally recommend fire safety precautions be taken.

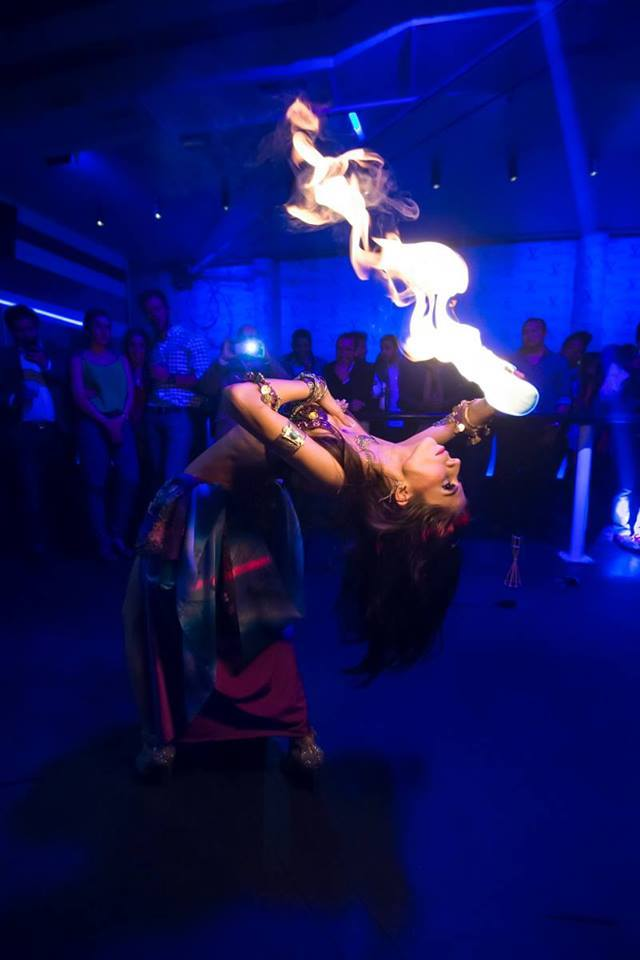
Fire Belly Dancer Houston, Texas

== History ==
One of the earliest mentions of fire performance was at the ceremony of Simchat Beit HaShoeivah during the holidays of sukkot of the Second Temple by the Jews in Jerusalem Circa 10AD - 70AD. It has been said about Rabbi Simeon ben Gamaliel that when he was rejoicing with the joy of the Water-Drawing he would take eight burning torches in one hand and toss them upwards; he tossed one and caught one, and never did one touch the other.

Ancient Aztecs performed a fire dance dedicated to Xiuhtecuhtli, the god of fire. The Aztec fire dance is performed today for tourists in Mexico. In Bali, the Angel Dance and the Fire Dance, regularly performed for tourists, have origins in ancient rituals. Both the Angel Dance and the Fire Dance originated in a trance ritual called the sanghyang, a ritual dance "performed to ward off witches at the time of an epidemic." Also known as the "horse dance" men perform the dance by holding rods representing horses, while leaping around burning coconut husks, and walking through the flames. Jamaica, French Polynesia, Antigua, Cuba and Saint Lucia are other locations where fire dances are recreated for (and by) tourists. The Siddha Jats of the Thar Desert in India perform traditional fire dances as part of the Spring festival. Fire dancing is performed to music played on drums and the behr. There are variations of the fire dancing; men often perform a dance that involves walking on hot coals and things. A large fire is created and allowed to burn down until it is a pit of glowing embers and things. The performers then jump in and out of the pit kicking up the embers and things to create showers of sparks while women perform a dance while balancing flaming tin pots on their heads. Today this ritual is often performed for (and by) tourists.

Another form of fire dancing comes from the people of Polynesia. "Poi" is a Māori object made of a "pōro" (ball) and "taura" (string); it is spun from the wrist in the performing art also known as poi. See Poi (performance art). Lighting poi on fire (also known as Fire Poi) is believed to have begun in the 1950's in Hawaii as a tourist attraction.

== Modern developments ==
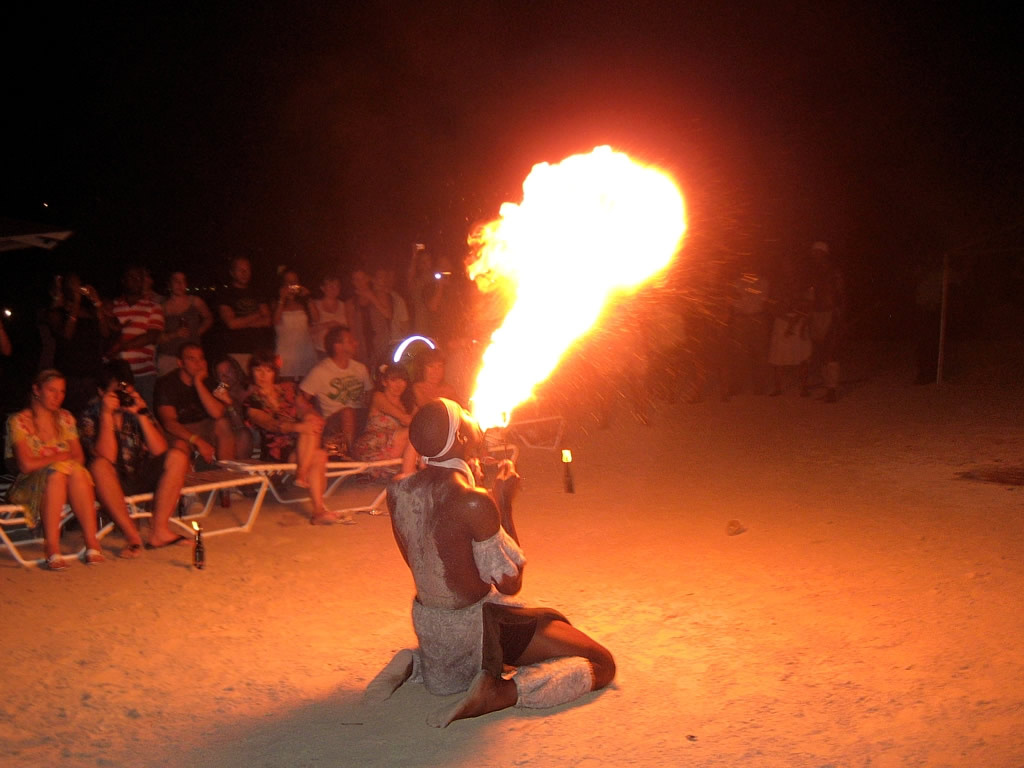
A fire breather performing for tourists in Antigua in the Caribbean.

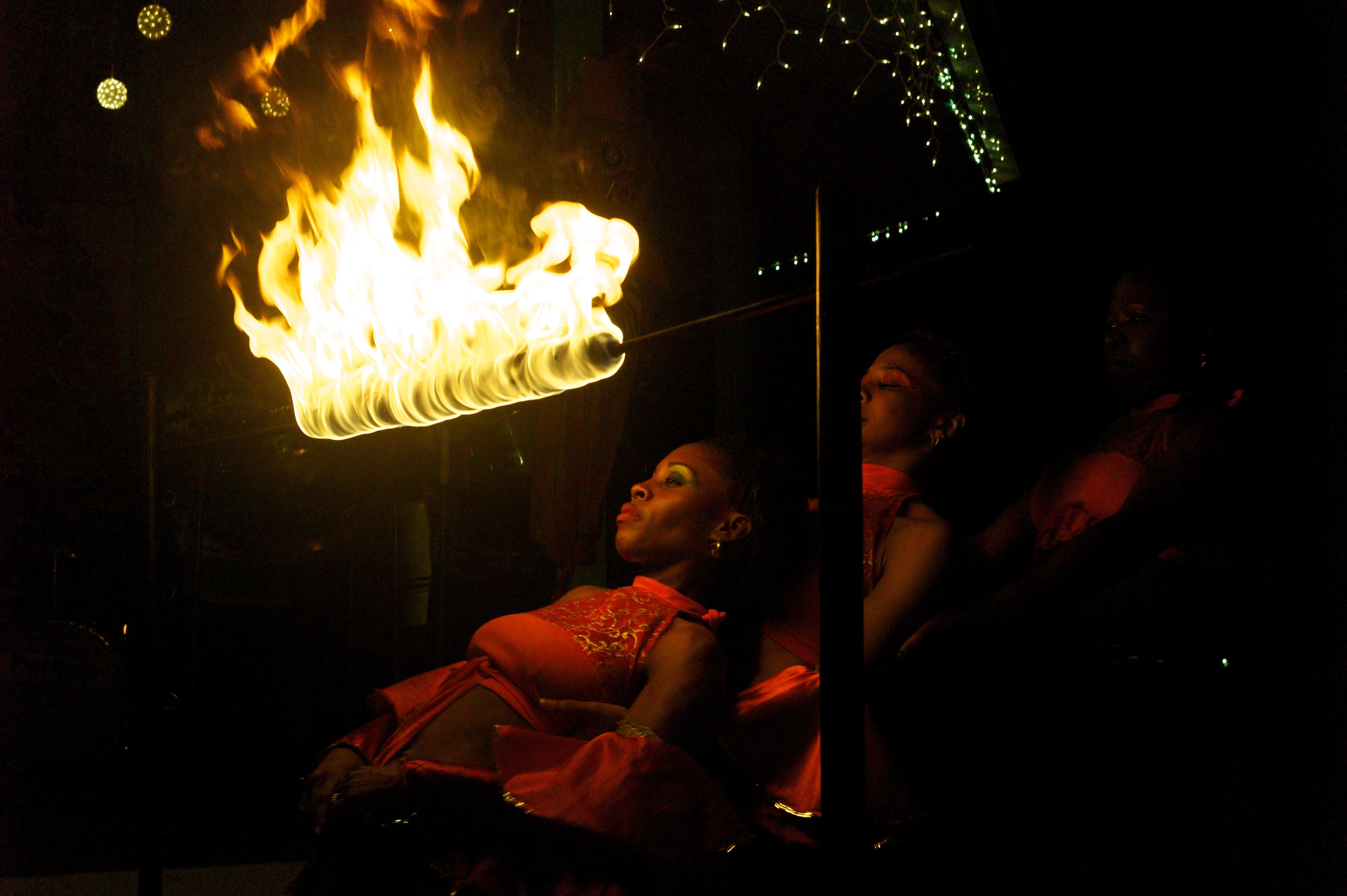
Limbo (dance) performers with a flaming pole in Saint Lucia

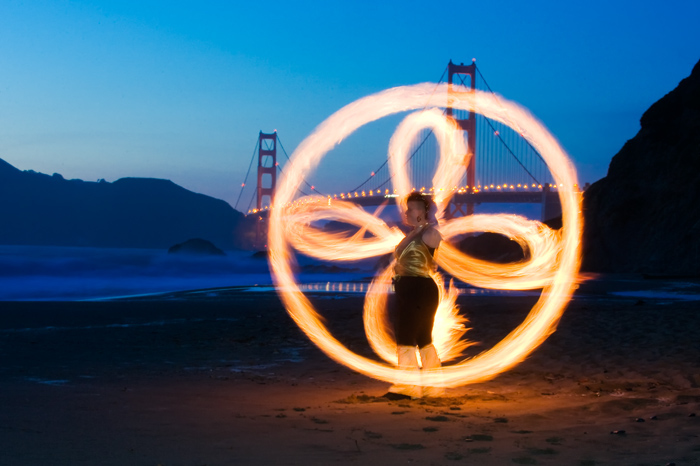
A San Francisco performance

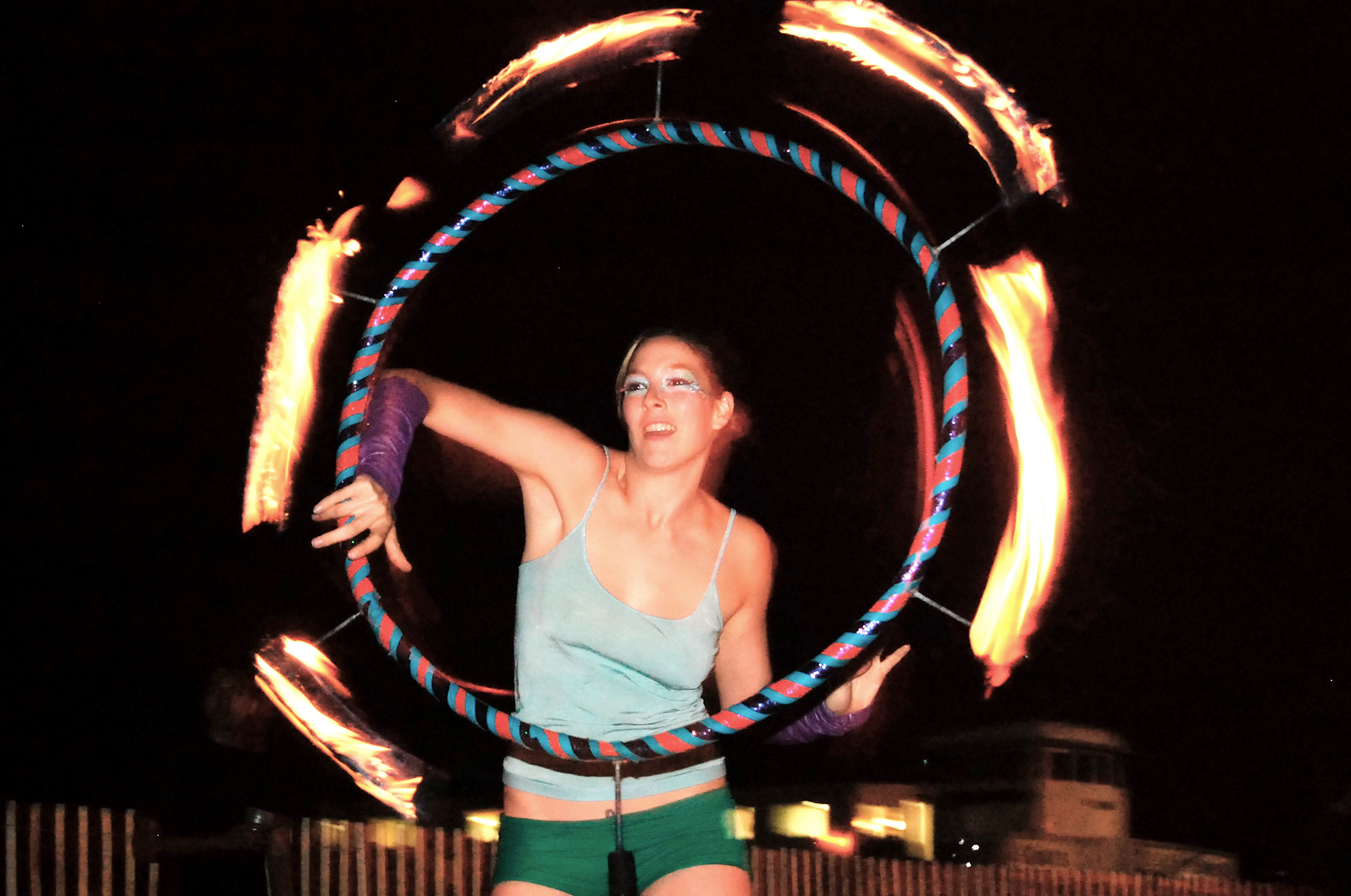
A fire hoop performer in New York City

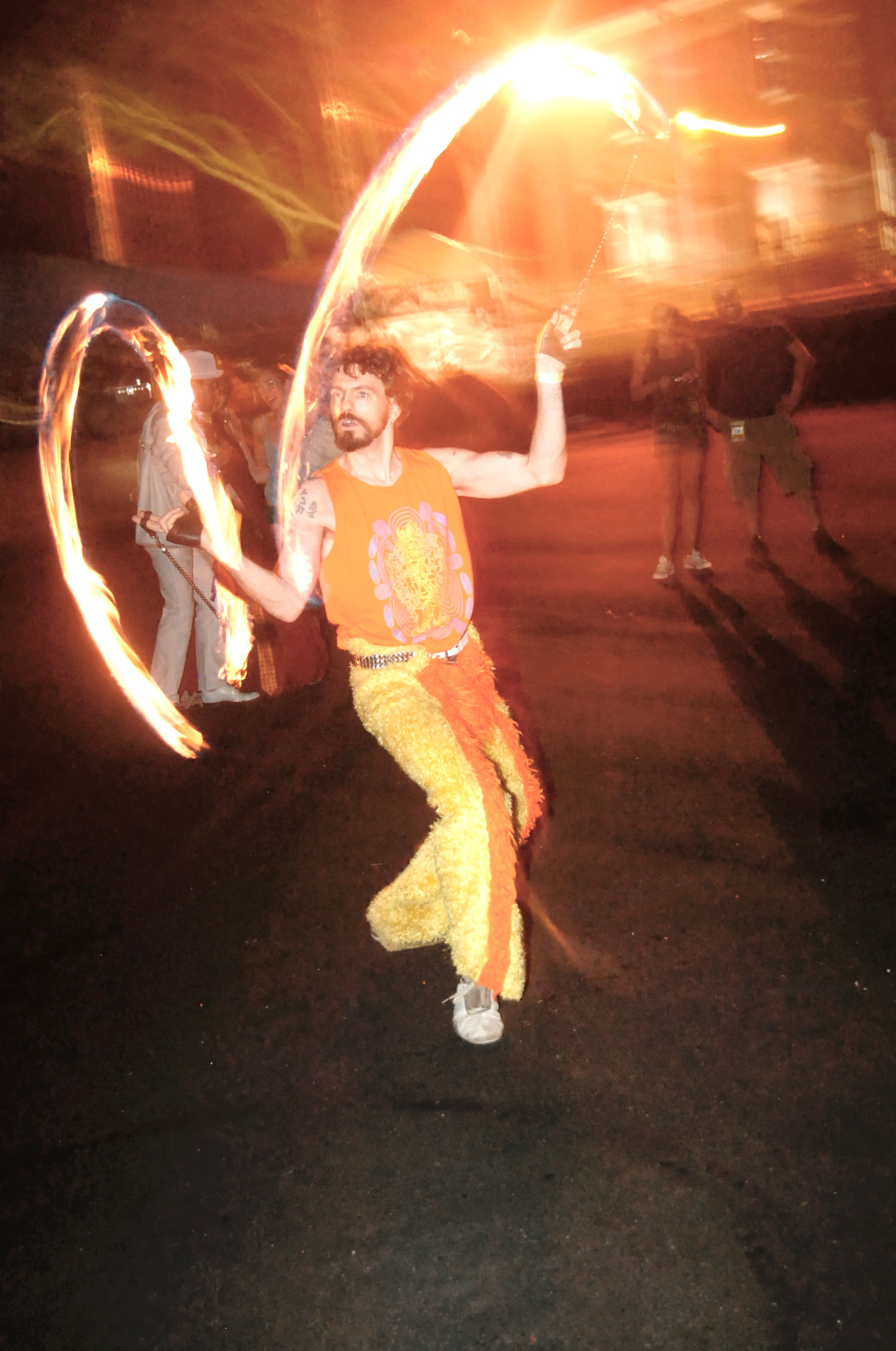
A firedancer in New York City using poi

A fire troupe performs at makerspace Xanadu; fire breathing and fire twirling are illustrated

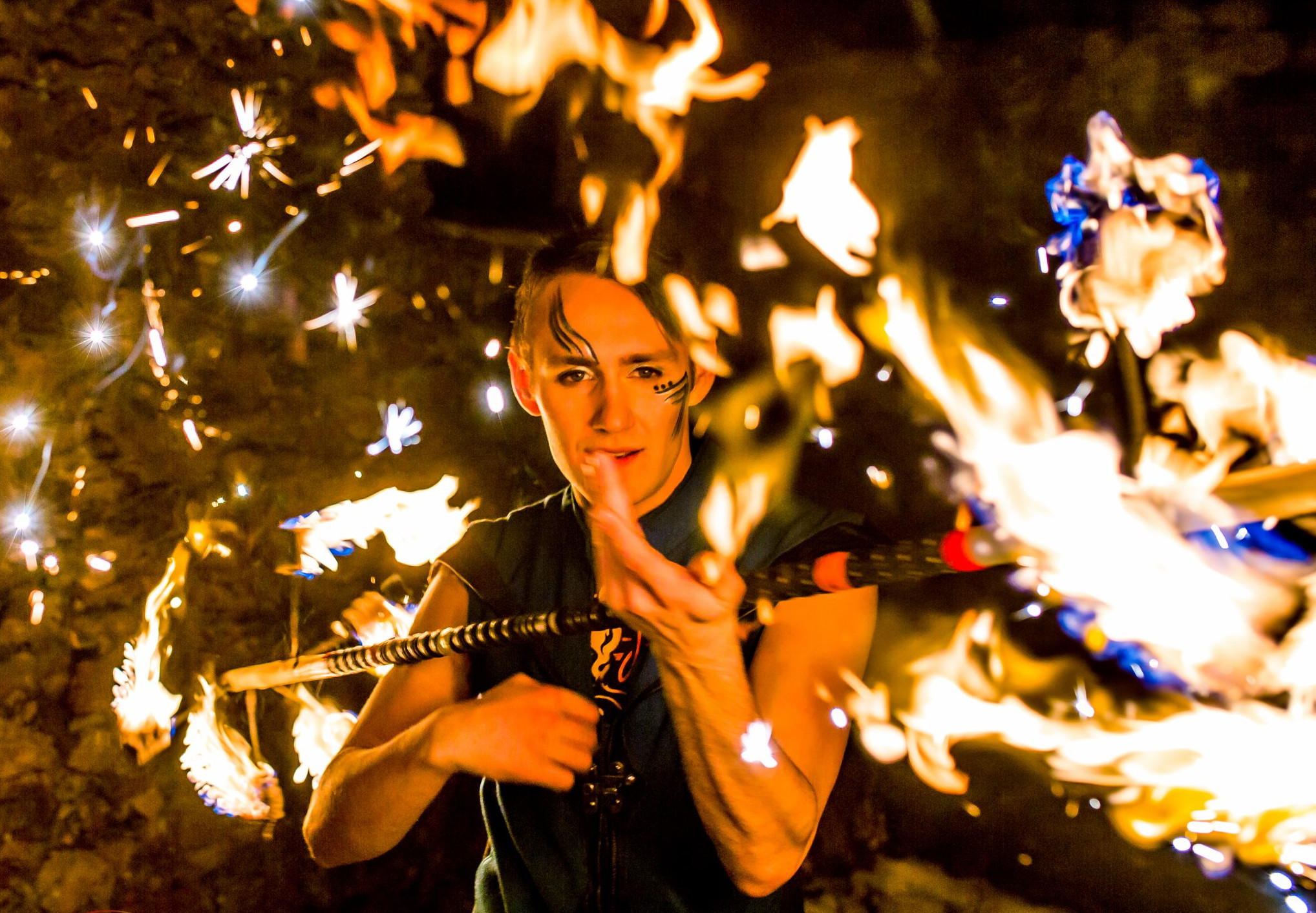
Fire spinning dragon staff.

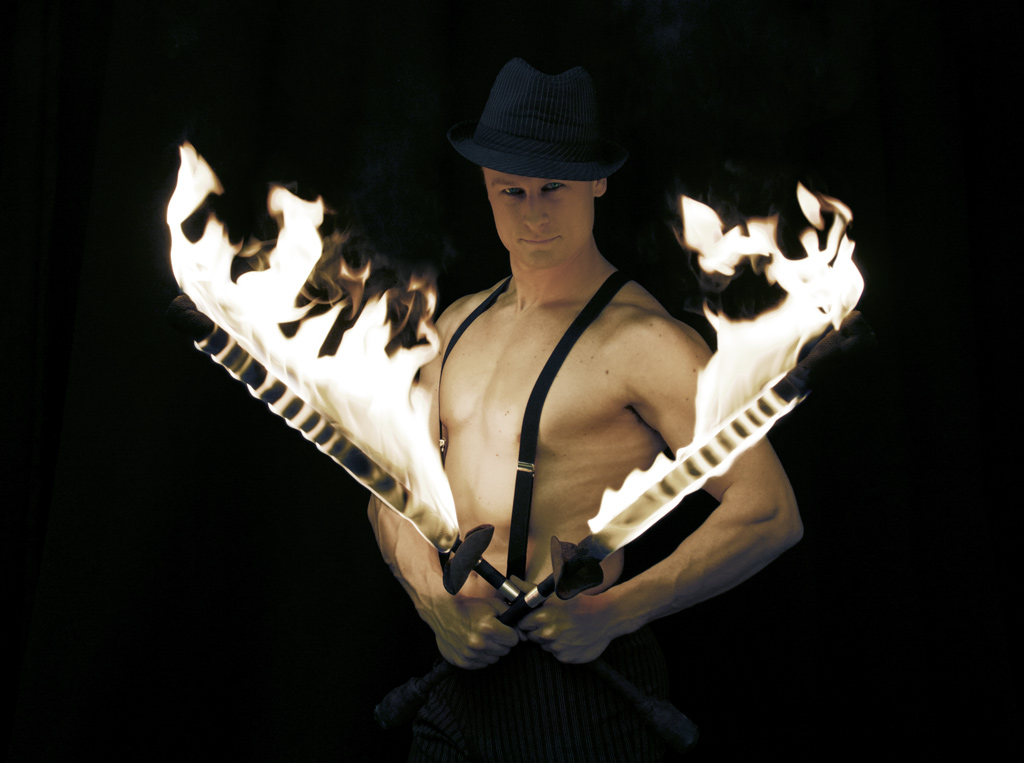
Performer with fire swords.

Since the mid-1990s, fire performance has grown in popularity. This growth has occurred both for hobby and professional practitioners. Fire skills are performed at raves, nightclubs, beach parties, and music festivals. One such festival that is especially popular with fire performers is Burning Man. Fire performance has become increasingly popular as entertainment at corporate events, street festivals, celebration events and as a precursor to firework displays.

== Types ==
Fire performance has become more popular through the availability of a wider variety of fire equipment and teaching methods.

- Traditional fire shows: Traditional shows often incorporate Polynesian costuming and other cultural elements. Many conform to the guidelines or are inspired by the annual World Fireknife Competition and Samoa Festival.
- Modern fire shows: These shows vary greatly from performances choreographed to music to street style shows with varying levels of audience interaction and participation. Modern fire shows can use a very wide range of fire skills and props.
- Fire theatre: Such shows are theatrical shows which include fire and fire performance as elements of staged dramatic presentations. Often the fire performance is a small element of the larger show. These shows tend to use more elaborate props and costuming and can focus less on technical skill.
- Fire fetish show: Such shows are recognizable by more overt sexuality in the performance and often extremely risqué costuming, nudity, and implied or actual sexual contact between performers, and are often seen as a fusion between exotic dancing or burlesque with fire dancing. Thus, fire fetish refers to a particular style of performance, and not a sexual fetish on the part of the performer, as would pyrophilia.
- Erotic fire show: Such shows may be seen as simply a normal improvised fire dance but with emphasis on sexually arousing body gyrations, seductive facial expressions, an eroticised musical selection (such as R&B or downtempo music), and the performer wearing minimal or no clothing, thus promoting sexual arousal or desire in addition to the expected visual entertainment for an audience. Unlike a fire fetish show, this performance is generally more low-key, slower in tempo, and may be performed by a solo dancer in front of a small and select audience, often a spouse or romantic partner. This performance can be an active and visually exciting form of ritual foreplay, enticing to some audiences. In some cases this is a routine part of a strip club's offerings.
- Ritual fire show: Such shows are usually a fusion of pagan or occult ceremony with fire and fire performance. They focus less on technical skill, and more on the use of the fire dancer to highlight the ritual or represent the specific element of fire.
- Fire and belly dance: Such shows are a fusion of Middle Eastern belly dancing (raqs sharqi) and combine elements of fire dancing and belly dancing. Often the dancers use palm torches and fire swords made to resemble scimitars.
- Fire jugglers may combine juggling, fire and comedy into a live performance. This may include lighting parts of their body on fire.
- Flow artists (see Object manipulation) who specialise in fire props may utilise equipment such as Fire staff, Hula hoop and Devil sticks.

== Fire apparatus ==
Fire performance is usually performed with props that have specifically been made for the purpose. Fire torches, fire staffs, fire poi, fire hula hoops, fire whips, and other fire props are all readily available.

- Poi – A pair of roughly arm-length chains with handles attached to one end, and bundle of wicking material on the other.
- Staff – A metal or wooden tube ranging from 1–2 m long with wicking material applied to one or both ends. Staffs are typically used individually or in pairs. juggling three or more is also possible.
- Dragonstaff – A metal or wooden tube around 2 m long where each end consists of three or more wicks arranged in a wheel. Dragon staves are more often rolled on the body rather than spun.
- Fire hoop – hoop with spokes and wicking material attached.
- Fan – A large metal fan with one or more wicks attached to the edges.
- Fire umbrella – an umbrella-like performance prop that can be constructed in a variety of ways.
- Fire meteor – A long length of chain or rope with wicks, or small bowls of liquid fuel, attached to both ends.
- Nunchaku – Nunchaku with wicking material, usually at either end.
- Fire stick – Like a traditional devil stick, with wicks on both ends of the central stick.
- Torch – A club or baton, with a wick on one end, and swung like Indian clubs or tossed end-over-end like juggling clubs.
- Fire knife – Short stave with blade attached to the end and wicking material applied to the blade. Fire knives are the traditional Polynesian fire implement and have been in use since the 1940s.
- Fire rope dart – A wick, sometimes wrapped around a steel spike, at the end of a rope or chain ranging from 6–15 feet long, with a ring or other handle on the opposite end.
- Fire wand – a short metal rod, usually 28 inches long with two wicks on each end and a length of fire-resistant string threaded through the middle. The wand is balanced to stay upright and gives the appearance that it is levitating around the user. It is also known as a levitation wand, levi-stick or flow wand.
- Fire sword – either a real sword modified for fire, or one specifically built for the purpose of fire shows with a fibreglass centre wrapped in kevlar wick.
- Fire orb – 2 rings or handles with a wick attached between them by a thin wire. Also known as a fire bug or Chi ball.
- Fire fingers – Short and thin torches attached to individual fingers.
- Palm torches – Small torches with a flat base meant to be held upright in the palm of the hand.
- Fire hip belt – A motorcycle chain belt with five spokes extending at equal intervals with wicking on the ends.
- Fire whip – Lengths of braided aramid fiber tapered to make a bullwhip, usually with a metal handle about 12 inches long. The whip can be cracked to create large plumes of fire.
- Fire flogger – A traditional BDSM flogger with kevlar or Technora tails. Can be used for both performance and temperature play
- Fire rope/snake – Similar to poi, but has a short 3–5 inch chain attaching the handles to a 12-inch or longer kevlar or Technora rope.
- Fire jump rope – A jump rope made of kevlar or Technora.
- Fire cannon – a propane flame effect device; larger ones can shoot a pillar of fire up to 200+ feet in the air, although they usually are mounted to a base or vehicle.
- Fire poofer – Similar to fire cannons, but much smaller and made to be held, with fuel stored in a "backpack" fashioned of one or more propane tanks.
- Fire ball – Specially constructed juggling balls, either solid balls dipped in fuel and juggled with protective gloves, or ones designed to contain the flame in the centre of the ball.
- Wearable fire – Headdresses, hip belts, arm bands, or other garments made typically of metal with kevlar or Technora torches attached. Can be worn while fire dancing.
- Fire Buugeng – A buugeng or S-staff with wicks attached usually used as a pair.
- Triads – A prop that has a center ring for gripping or spinning around the thumb and fingers, with three equidistant spokes that protrude approximately 12 inches from the center ring. Each spoke has a wick at the end. Usually used as a pair.

=== Fuels ===
Nearly all modern fire performance apparatus rely on a liquid fuel soaked in the wick. There are many choices for fuels, which differ in their specific properties. Fire performers select a fuel or a blend of fuels based on safety, cost, availability, and the desirability of various characteristics of the fuel including for example, the colour of flame, and flame temperature. There is also some geographic variance in fuels used, due to local availability and price. American fire performers often use white gas, while British fire performers use paraffin (called kerosene in the US) or the white gas substitute petroleum naphtha.

=== Safety ===
Fire performance skills are inherently dangerous and only careful use of the props, storage of the fuel and performance in appropriate spaces will mean that the risks are minimised. Fire insurance policies all require fire performers to carry fire extinguishers, fire blankets or other fire safety equipment. There is a common understanding in the fire performance community that safety is the highest priority and that aspiring performers must "learn before they burn."

== Fire arts education ==
There are organized events in various parts of the world teaching fire arts and object manipulation. These events which can be fire festivals or workshops at juggling or music festivals are popular in US, Canada, United Kingdom and Australia.

== See also ==
- Beltane Fire Festival
- Burnoff
- Busking
- Devil sticks
- Dexterity play
- Fire lance
- Fire performance (Indonesia)
- Fire staff
- Fire triangle
- Flame projector
- Josephine Girardelli
- Lucent Dossier Experience
