= Fire knife =

Samoan cultural implement

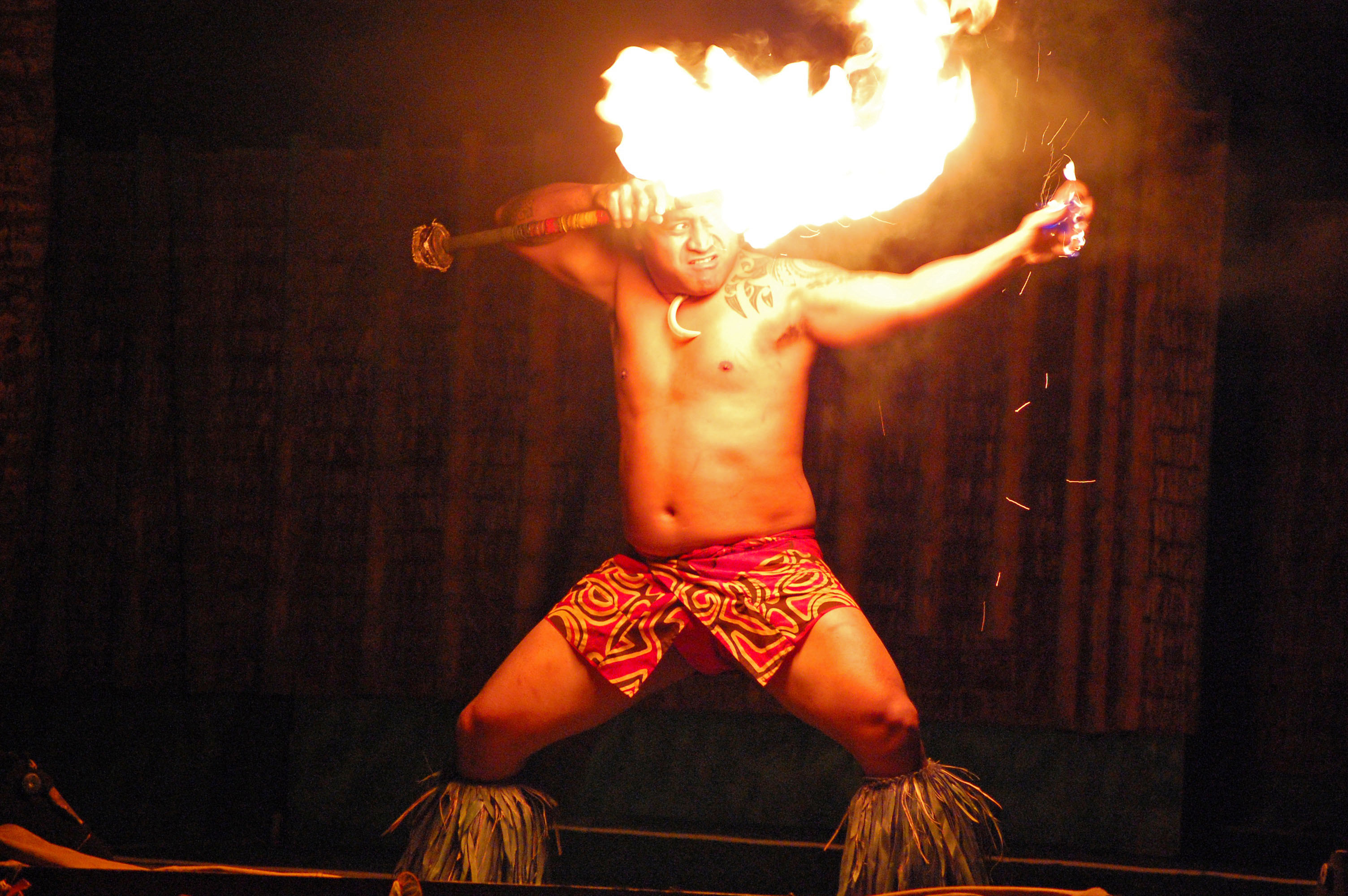
A Hawaiian fire knife dancer

The fire knife is a traditional Samoan cultural implement that is used in ceremonial dances. It was originally composed of a machete wrapped in towels on both ends with a portion of the blade exposed in the middle. Tribal performers of fire knife dancing (or Siva Afi or even "Ailao Afi" as it is called in Samoa) dance while twirling the knife and doing other acrobatic stunts. The towels are set afire during the dances, hence the name.

== History ==
Polynesian historians and authorities on Samoan cultural history state that the training of Toa warriors in the art of hand to hand combat with the Nifo Oti, the serrated-edged Samoan war club, came into prominence between 900 - 1200 AD. It was the favorite weapon of the Tui Manu'a Empire in the time of King Maui Tagote of the Eastern Samoan Island groups. These war clubs were often edged with the teeth of sharks, saw fish, swordfish, and other sea creatures.

The Siva Afi was originally performed with the Nifo Oti, which was very dangerous. The modern fire knife dance has its roots in the ancient Samoan exhibition called ailao – the flashy demonstration of a Samoan warrior's battle prowess through artful twirling, throwing and catching, and dancing with a war club. The ailao could be performed with any warclub, and some colonial accounts confirm that women also performed ailao at the head of ceremonial processions, especially daughters of high chiefs. It was conceived on the Island of Upolu between the years 1200 - 1250 AD, coming into cultural prominence during the reign of King Maui Tagote. Ancient legend speaks of 400 warriors who trained with their Nifo Oti.

During night dances, torches were often twirled and swung about by dancers, although a warclub was the usual implement used for ailao in remembrance of the three brothers Tuna, Fata, and Savea and their defeat of the Tongan invaders. Before the introduction of metals, the most common clubs that were wielded and displayed in the ailao fashion were elaborately carved heirloom clubs called anava. These anava were frequently carved with serrated edges and jagged "teeth" which characterized the unique Samoan weapon called the "nifo'oti".

=== The Expulsion of The Tu'i Tonga Talakaifaiki & The Birth of Malietoa, The Birth of Siva Afi. ===
For approximately 200 years, the Tu'i Tonga Talakaifaiki established a long-term residence in ata Safotu, Savai'i, Samoa. The location for the Tu'i Tonga Talakaifaiki's upcoming birthday festivities was a beautiful famous stretch of beach in Aleipata, a region on the Eastern side of Upolu.

The seeds of rebellion were planted, according to legend, by three brothers—the "sons" of Atiogie, namely Savea, Tuna, Fata—and a fourth Toa warrior, Ulumasui (who was actually a grandson of Atiogie). The three brothers and their nephew eventually lead a wide-scale campaign of civil disobedience, which ultimately escalated into the military overthrow of Talakaifaiki.

Samoan warriors were called upon to dance and entertain the Tu'i Tonga Talakaifaiki during a birthday celebration for the ruler of Tonga. The Tongans had ruled parts of Samoa (Upolu and Savai’i) but were not able to conquer the Eastern Samoan Islands, namely Manu’a and Manono, whose warriors famously held off Tongan and Fijian invasions on numerous occasions. The Manu'a warriors were renowned throughout Eastern Polynesia for their strength and ferocity.

The Samoan warriors arrived to prepare their entertainment for Tu'i Tonga Talakaifaiki. The Samoans buried weapons (nifo oti) in the sand all around the beach area as they plied the Tongans with "bush gin". Then, they utilized their nifo oti, which have remained the same design for the last millennia as those favored when the Samoans were actually head hunters, to behead the victim, while the hook carried the trophy.

As night set in, the Festivities and party progressed, more "bush gin" was consumed, and the Samoan warriors "performed" for the Tongan ruler. They had wrapped both ends of their nifo-oti with dry palm sennit, which was then dipped into the fires to create a blaze on one end of the knife. They danced and pointed out the locations of the buried weapons to other Samoan warriors, who were waiting in small paopaos (canoes) offshore. The warriors then stormed the beach, recovered the weapons and set them ablaze as they proceeded to drive the Tongans in a bloody battle all the way across the island, from east to the westernmost point of Upolu.

Driven westward from Aleipata, Upolu (where the Tu'i Tonga's birthday festivities were underway) to the coast of Mulifanua, the Tongan ruler and his bodyguards were cornered against the sea. There was fierce fighting all the way to the sea, whereon the Tu'i Tonga reached his superior navy vessels and called out to those on the land. The Tongans who were not killed eventually boarded boats and left Samoa for good. Upon his departure, the Tongan monarch delivered a short speech that praised the brave fighting qualities of the Samoan warriors and conceded victory to his once-subjects. The Malietoa title is taken from the opening phrase of that speech: "Mālie toa, mālie tau," meaning "great warriors, well fought."

== Etymology ==
When European and American whalers and traders began commercial ventures in Samoa, they introduced the natives to the long-handled blubber knife and the hooked cane knife. The characteristic metal hook of these tools was readily incorporated into the Samoan wooden nifo'oti, which bears the unique hooked element whether carved from wood or forged from steel. One common claim is that the word "nifo'oti" means "tooth of death", but this is not linguistically accurate as Samoan syntax places the modifier after the subject; according to Samoan grammar, the term "nifo'oti" would actually mean "dead tooth", hardly as intimidating as the former translation. One more linguistic issue remains to be worked out in regards to 'oti (with the initial glottal stop) and "oti" (without the glottal stop).

When pronounced with the glottal stop, the word 'oti does not mean "death" at all; as a verb, 'oti means "to cut" as in 'otiulu ("hair cut"), or, as a noun, it refers to the domestic goat. Therefore, the most probable derivation of the term "nifo'oti" stems from the resemblance of the weapon's hook to the curved horn ("nifo") of a goat ("'oti"), or from the serrated teeth ("nifo") that formed the weapon's cutting edge ('oti).

== Revival ==
The young man Tavita Vaoifi revived the Samoan ailao Siva Afi dance to eventually bring it home to Samoa from Hawai'i. He had won a scholarship from the Church of Jesus Christ of Latter Day Saints. This was while WWII was being fought in part in his beloved South Pacific. When he was able to come to America, he went to school, worked, and danced. After he read this information, in his spare time, he researched anything that he could find about his homeland. This story struck him deeply, because he had never heard of this from his elders. He was determined to incorporate this treasure into his island dance routine. After many cuts, burns, and narrow escapes, he was able to perfect this dance, to the point where he performed it nightly at clubs and shows throughout not only the San Francisco area but the entire country.

Fire was a part of Tavita's dance as he found it just as it was described in the book from the library. There were no towels used, only palm fronds and dry leaves. The crowd in America, which came to find out what he had discovered about Samoa, were frightened when they saw him whirling the fire. The Superintendent of the Mormon school where Tavita was teaching at the time was able to calm the audience and assure them that no harm would come to them.

He eventually returned to Samoa to bring back this part of the Samoan Culture that was unheard of until he performed. After that, for years he taught the dance and judged many contests in Samoa and other countries. He was rewarded for the notices and tourists he encouraged to visit his beloved homeland with the High Chief Title, A'e, from the head of state Malietoa Tanumafili II.

Mrs. Tavita Vaoifi wrote, after being married to him for 12 years, from 1979 until his death in 1991 from Cyclone Val, the information about fire not being a part of the "Fireknife Dance" until 1946 is a mistake.

Although today many commercial performers perform the dance with short staffs or knives without blade, this is not authentic fire knife dance and is unacceptable in Samoan cultural practices except for training purposes. The knives used by performers in American Samoa are still made of machetes, although they are often dulled for younger dancers.

== Competition ==
Traditional competitions were hotly contested. Their exhibitionists would almost rather die than seek medical care for injuries incurred while performing. Today, modern competitions are held annually at the Polynesian Cultural Center to name the World Fireknife Champion. The competition began in 1992 and is always held during the third week of May. In 2007, the championships were expanded to welcome competitors in a duet category and a women's category. In 2010, the event expanded to four nights including a two-night, three-person final competition.

Champions by year are:

- 2026: Falaniko Penesa (Samoa)
- 2025: Hale Motu'apuaka (Wahiawa, Hawaii)
- 2024: Tafili Viceson Galeai (Laie, Hawaii)
- 2023: Falaniko Penesa (Samoa)
- 2022: Hale Motu'apuaka (Wahiawa, Hawaii)
- 2021: Hale Motu'apuaka (Wahiawa, Hawaii)
- 2019: Falaniko Penesa (Samoa)
- 2018: Hale Motu'apuaka (Wahiawa, Hawaii)
- 2017: Falaniko Penesa (Samoa)
- 2016: Mikaele Oloa (Waialua, Hawaii)
- 2015: Joseph Cadousteau (Papeete, Tahiti)
- 2014: Viavia Tiumalu, Jr. (Orlando, Florida)
- 2013: Joseph Cadousteau (Papeete, Tahiti)
- 2012: Joseph Cadousteau (Papeete, Tahiti)
- 2010: Mikaele Oloa (Waialua, Hawaii)
- 2011: Viavia Tiumalu, Jr. (Orlando, Florida)
- 2009: Mikaele Oloa (Waialua, Hawaii)
- 2008: Viavia Tiumalu, Jr. (Orlando, Florida)
- 2007: Andrew "Umi" Sexton (Orlando, Florida)
- 2006: Mikaele Oloa (Orlando, Florida)
- 2005: Mikaele Oloa (Orlando, Florida)
- 2004: Alex Galeai (Laie, Hawaii)
- 2003: David Galeai (Cook Islands)
- 2002: Pati Levasa (Samoa)
- 2001: Pati Levasa (Samoa)
- 2000: David Galeai (Cook Islands)
- 1999: David Galeai (Cook Islands)
- 1998: Pati Levasa (Samoa)
- 1997: Pati Levasa (Samoa)
- 1996: Ifi Soo (Maui, Hawaii)
- 1995: Ifi Soo (Maui, Hawaii)
- 1994: Ifi Soo (Maui, Hawaii)
- 1993: Tauasa Sielu Avea (Laie, Hawaii)

== Modern use ==
The Samoan Siva Afi has become an integral part of any Polynesian Luau or show. Many other Polynesian Islands have implemented the Siva Afi into their own Island shows especially in the Islands of Tahiti, Hawai'i, Cook Islands Fiji and Tonga. Because of the close familial tribal ties with the aforementioned Islands and the Samoa Islands, the fire knife dance has almost become homogenized as part of those Islands' own culture.

In the mid 20th century, the ancient traditions were commercialized and westernized. Over time, the performing implement has changed. The wooden handle gradually lengthened and the blade got shorter. Eventually, the exposed portion was part of the handle. Some of the moves performed in shows now are more modern and flashy than traditional battle preparations. As such, they are often performed at accelerated speeds. It is probable that the danger of sharpened blades and the demand for multiple daily shows by top performers has caused the sharpened blade to disappear entirely from commercial performances.

Some modern training tools use practice batons or LED-based equipment to simulate fire knife performance in safer environments. These systems allow performers to rehearse timing, rotation, and spatial control without the risks associated with open flame or sharpened blades.

Now, when one travels to Hawaii, it is quite common to see commercial 'Fire Knife Dancing' performed with wooden or aluminum poles wrapped in towels. These performances are often part of Luau festivities or Polynesian shows that include Poi Ball performances.

== See also ==
- Fire dancing
- Fire staff
- Flaming sword (effect)
