= Fire staff =

Fire performance instrument

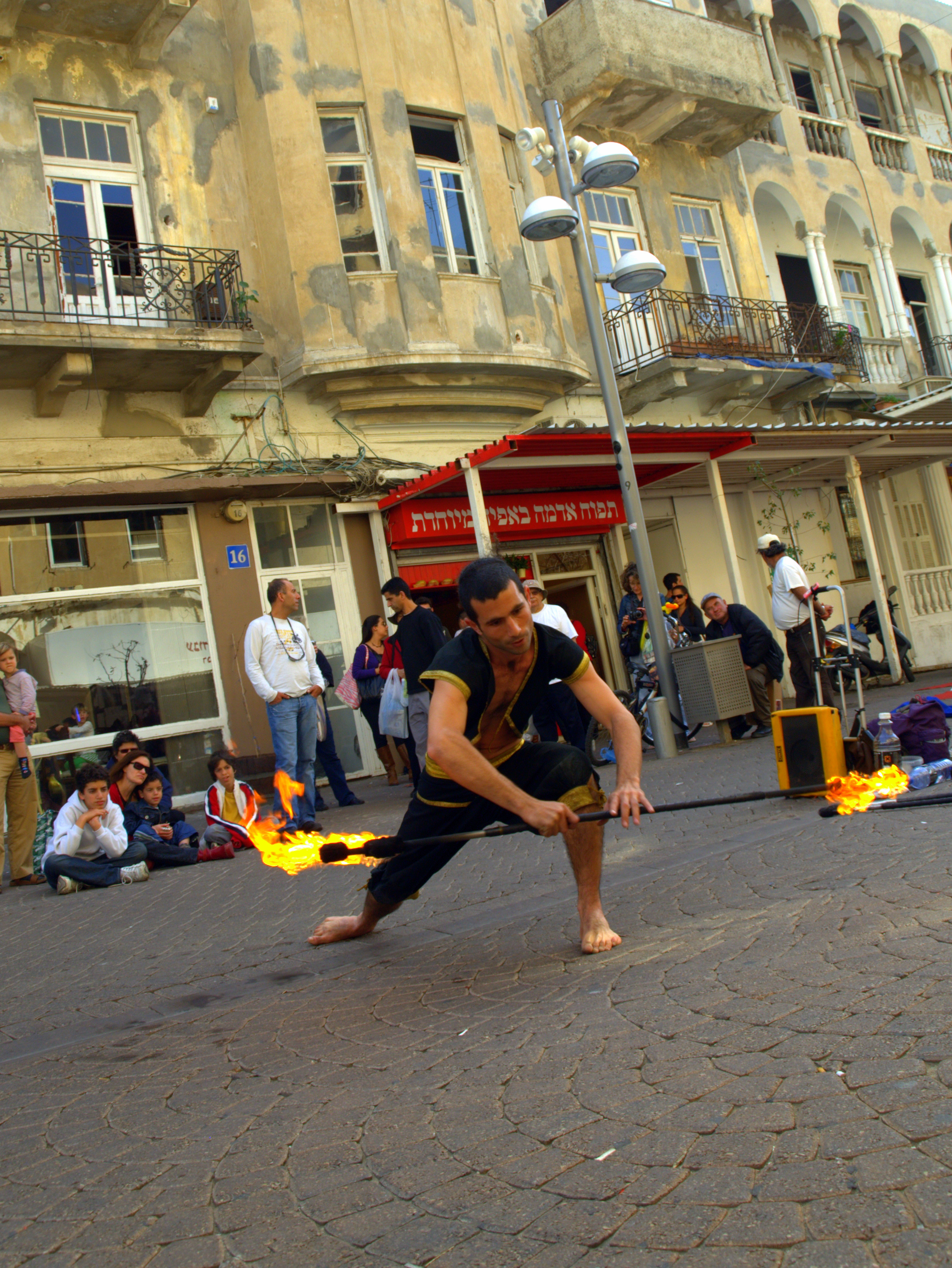

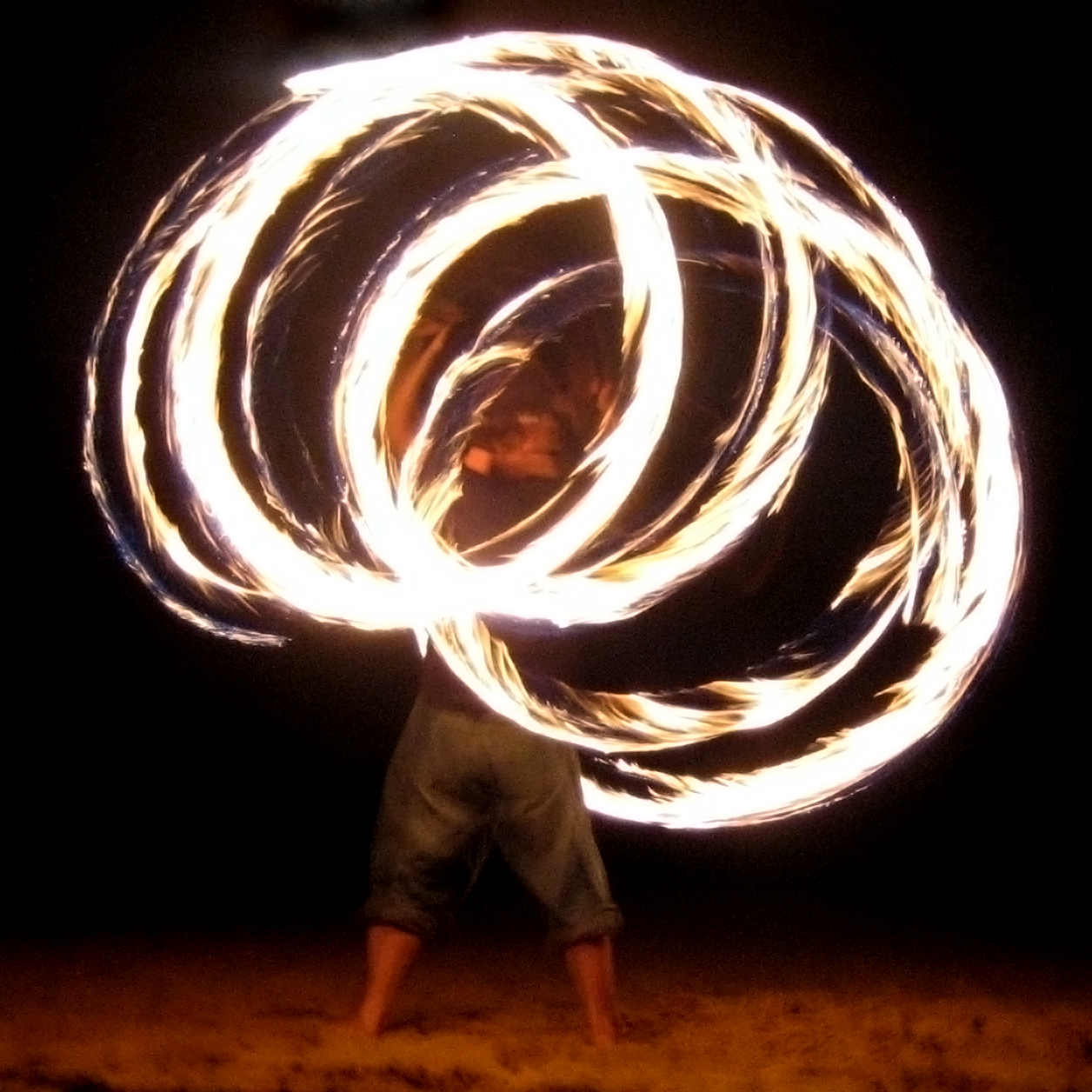

A fire staff is a staff constructed out of wood or metal with Kevlar wick added to one or both ends. Fire staffs are used for fire performance.

== Manipulation ==
There are two predominant styles for manipulating a fire staff: rotational and contact. In rotational fire staff manipulation, the performer's hands are used to manipulate the motion and rotation of the staff. Contact fire staff is a technique whereby the performer rolls the staff over parts of the arms, legs and body. Both techniques can be used in a performance. Another technique is staff juggling, in which three staffs are thrown and caught.

== Construction ==
Fire staffs can vary in length, weight, balance, and wick arrangements. A staff can range anywhere from a half-metre in length to two or more metres. Fire staffs contrast from fire knives in that their centre of balance rests in the middle of their length. The most common wick arrangement for a fire staff is two wicks of equal size and thickness on either end of the staff. However, multiple wicks may be placed on the staff, and may even be placed "out of balance", displacing the point of equilibrium. A "fire staff" with wicks on only one end of the staff, is not a fire staff – it is either a fire spear or fire spade, both of which employ vastly different movement styles than fire staff.

== Dragonstaff ==
One of the more extreme wick arrangements for fire staff is the Dragonstaff, named after the mythical beast with the front end of an eagle and the back legs of a lion. A cross of three, four or more wicks on spokes is added to the ends, which gives the staff more rotational inertia. The dragon staff is able to create incredibly intricate patterns of fire. A Dragonstaff is similar to a contact staff in that it rolls over a performer's body and isn't held, but requires a different set of skills to manipulate because of the larger ends and the extra momentum generated by the rotation or rolling of the staff.

== Instruction ==
Fire staff technique is taught around the world at fire dance festivals, workshops and retreats. Instructional DVDs and online videos are also available.

== Burnoff ==
A burnoff is a technique performed by a fire staff performer and aims to create two fireballs when excess fuel from the wicks of the staff spray outward from the spinning staff. A number of variations of the usual burnoff are possible, including the 'circular burnoff' and the 'helix burnoff'.
