= Chief Sielu =

Samoan-born comedian and cultural ambassador

Chief Sielu Malietoatauasa Faamoetauloa
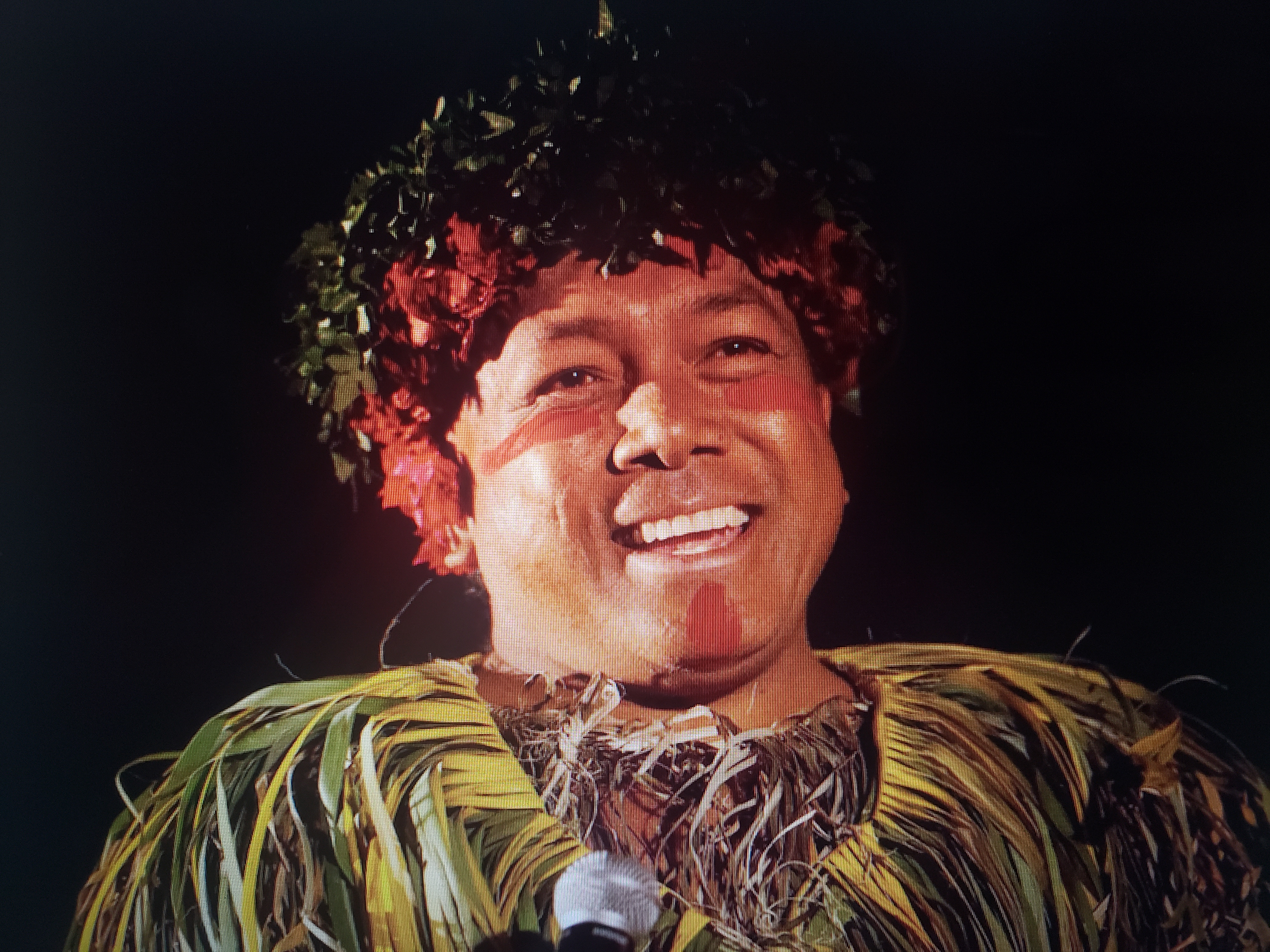
- Chief Sielu in 2015
- Born: Folosielu Avea; August 20, 1961 (age 64); Savai'i, Western Samoa
- Occupations: Luau producer, host, comedian, fire knife dancer, actor, musician, singer, author
- Years active: 1982–present
- Spouse: Sharla Avea (m. 1998)
- Children: 2
- Website: chiefsluauhawaii.com

Chief Sielu Avea (Chief Sielu in short) is a Samoan-born comedian and ambassador of Polynesian culture. Since 2012 he has been the producer and host of Chief's Luau, a Hawaiian Lūʻau on Oahu.

In 1993, Chief Sielu became the first World Fireknife Dance Champion, a title given to the winner of the World Fireknife Championships held annually in Laie, Hawaii. Since then, he has performed fire-knife in dozens of countries and started at Sea Life Park luau which is now Aloha Kai Luau. Chief Sielu has appeared on The Oprah Winfrey Show, The Tonight Show, MTV, BBC Television, Drunk History, Impractical Jokers, and the Miss Universe Pageant. In 2002, he threw the flaming spear that ignited the ceremonial torch at the Stadium of Fire event prior to the opening ceremony of the 2002 Winter Olympics in Salt Lake City.

Chief Sielu's formal title, awarded to him by the Head of the Independent State of Samoa, is Malietoatauasa Faamoetauloa.

== Early life ==
In 1981, Chief Sielu moved to Oahu to attend Brigham Young University-Hawaii. While studying there to major in mathematics, he worked part time at a nearby cultural museum, where he honed his entertainment skills. The experience changed the direction of his life.

At 25, he was tapped by the elders of Samoa to return to endure a weeklong tattooing ceremony, after which he was awarded the esteemed title of High Chief. The title was bestowed upon him by the Head of the Independent State of Samoa.

== Career ==
While a student at BYU Hawaii, Chief Sielu taught himself the art of fire knife dancing and pioneered a comedic routine for coconut husking and fire making cultural demonstrations. He performed regularly at the Polynesian Cultural Center in Laie until leaving the center in 2002. During his tenure there, he became the first official World Fire Knife Dance Champion and was recognized as one of Hawaii's premier cultural ambassadors and performers perpetuating traditional Polynesian culture through his charismatic charm and humor.

BYU Magazine observed that Chief Sielu was a born comedian whose entertainment skills are "so captivating, his audiences do not realize how much they are learning". The writer described how he climbed a coconut tree barefoot with only a loop of cloth to aid him after starting a fire with the aid of just two wooden sticks and some coconut fiber, striking poses for photos on his way up to a steady stream of laughter. His fire knife dance routine involves juggling flaming knives while occasionally tossing them high above the crowd. At a certain point he adds a second knife, twirling them both while jumping and doing handsprings over them. A final observation by the writer noted that the fire knife dance "was appropriately named, as Chief Sielu's arms and hands are covered with scars and burns".

Chief Sielu is recognized by the Samoa Tourism Authority as an international Polynesian celebrity and tourism ambassador, a status achieved through his three decades of entertaining tourists at luaus on Oahu, most recently in 2012 at his main production, Chief's Luau in Honolulu, where he shares his Polynesian culture with visitors to Hawaii.

Earlier in his performing career, Chief Sielu had performed his fire knife dance at other luaus on Oahu, including Germaine's Luau and Paradise Cove Luau. In 2014, Chief Sielu took a one-week hiatus from his Honolulu luau to headline Samoa's 24th annual Teuila Festival accompanied by his group of 20 luau performers at an invitation from the nation's Prime Minister.

Chief's Luau is now a prominent Hawaii activity on Oahu. Chief Sielu was the featured entertainer at Samoan Heritage Week in Honolulu in 2010.

=== Chief's Luau ===
The foundation for Chief's Luau was laid in the late 1980s when Chief Sielu was performing daytime cultural demonstrations. During that time, he was approached by Eddie Sax and Charlotte Sax, founders of the Honolulu Comedy Club (now operating as the Waikiki Comedy Club at the Hilton Waikiki Beach).

After seeing Chief Sielu's comedy coconut husking and fire making presentations, the Saxes asked him to appear at their comedy club alongside the stand-up comedians they brought to Hawaii from Los Angeles and New York including George Wallace, Jeff Foxworthy, Brad Garrett, Jeff Dunham, and George Lopez. His working relationship with the Saxes expanded in 2012 when they partnered to create Chief's Luau.

Chief Sielu explains that the philosophy behind his Oahu luau production goes beyond revitalizing ancient tradition and custom. He incorporates an interactive experience with his guests so they become an integral part of the entire luau experience. Included are the instructional and learning portions of the luau program with his cast of warriors directly participating in the program's stage production.

Chief Sielu was featured on the cover of MidWeek Magazine on October 16, 1991. The magazine's story noted that his ultimate goal was to create the best luau in Hawaii, a passion born from what he says he perceived as a lack of Hawaiian activities focusing on cultural preservation with enough entertainment value to hold visitors’ attention. The Chief described his work as different because he shares the ways of old Polynesia but adds the energy from his Samoan roots for feasting, celebration, and hands on interaction.

In December 2017, Wet'n'Wild Hawaii built a new home for Chief's Luau and its owners, Chief Sielu and Eddie Sax. The 50,000 square foot renovation was designed by Chief Sielu himself and made a reality by Wet'n'Wild owners Jerry Pupillo and Scott Loos.

In a 2018 television interview on KHON-TV, Chief Sielu noted that as the creator, producer, and host of Chief's Luau, the motivation behind how he designed the new space, which is located in a secluded section inside the Wet’n’Wild facility, was based on creating a feeling. He explained that he wanted to make the experience of Chief's Luau more than just a show - he wanted to make it for the people and the feeling he wants them to experience. From May 2012 through December 2017, Chief's Luau operated its luau at Sea Life Park until moving to its permanent venue at Wet’n’Wild.

Chief Sielu credits his mother and father with instilling him with the desire to share his Polynesian culture with people from all walks of life. Chief Sielu explains that there is no script for the show, and that everything is conveyed through feelings and spirit. He advocates sharing the Aloha spirit with everybody who comes to the islands. Compared to the other Oahu luaus, he believes his vision has been achieved in Chief's Luau.

=== Actor ===
Chief Sielu made his cinematic debut in Brett Wagner's short film Chief, an award-winning piece at the 2008 Sundance Film Festival. The film follows the character Semu Fatutoa, played by Chief Sielu, who drives a taxi in Honolulu. He had previously been a village chief in Samoa, but tragedy compelled him to flee his home and cover his tattoos. The plot of the movie features Fatutoa driving in circles, trying to forget about his old life and coming upon a young Hawaiian girl in desperate need of his help.

Chief was the first Hawaii-made short film ever to be featured at the Sundance Film Festival. It also won the Best Dramatic Short Award at the Los Angeles International Short Film Festival (a.k.a. LA Shorts Fest), an honor that qualified it for Oscar consideration. Chief was shown in more than a dozen film festivals internationally, including the Hawaii International Film Festival. IndieWire named Chief one of Sundance's must-see shorts.

=== Author ===
In 1994, Chief Sielu published a book on the Samoan tattoo titled Tatau: The art of the Samoan tattoo.

== Personal life ==
Chief Sielu Avea, his wife, Sharla Avea, and their two children, Samuta and Siela, live in Hauʻula, Hawaii on the north shore of the island of Oahu. Samuta plays basketball for the University of Hawaii in the Hawaii Rainbow Warriors basketball program. Siela is an all-star high school volleyball player.

== See also ==
- Lūʻau
- Polynesian culture
- Hawaii International Film Festival
