= Fire fan =

Fan used for fire performance

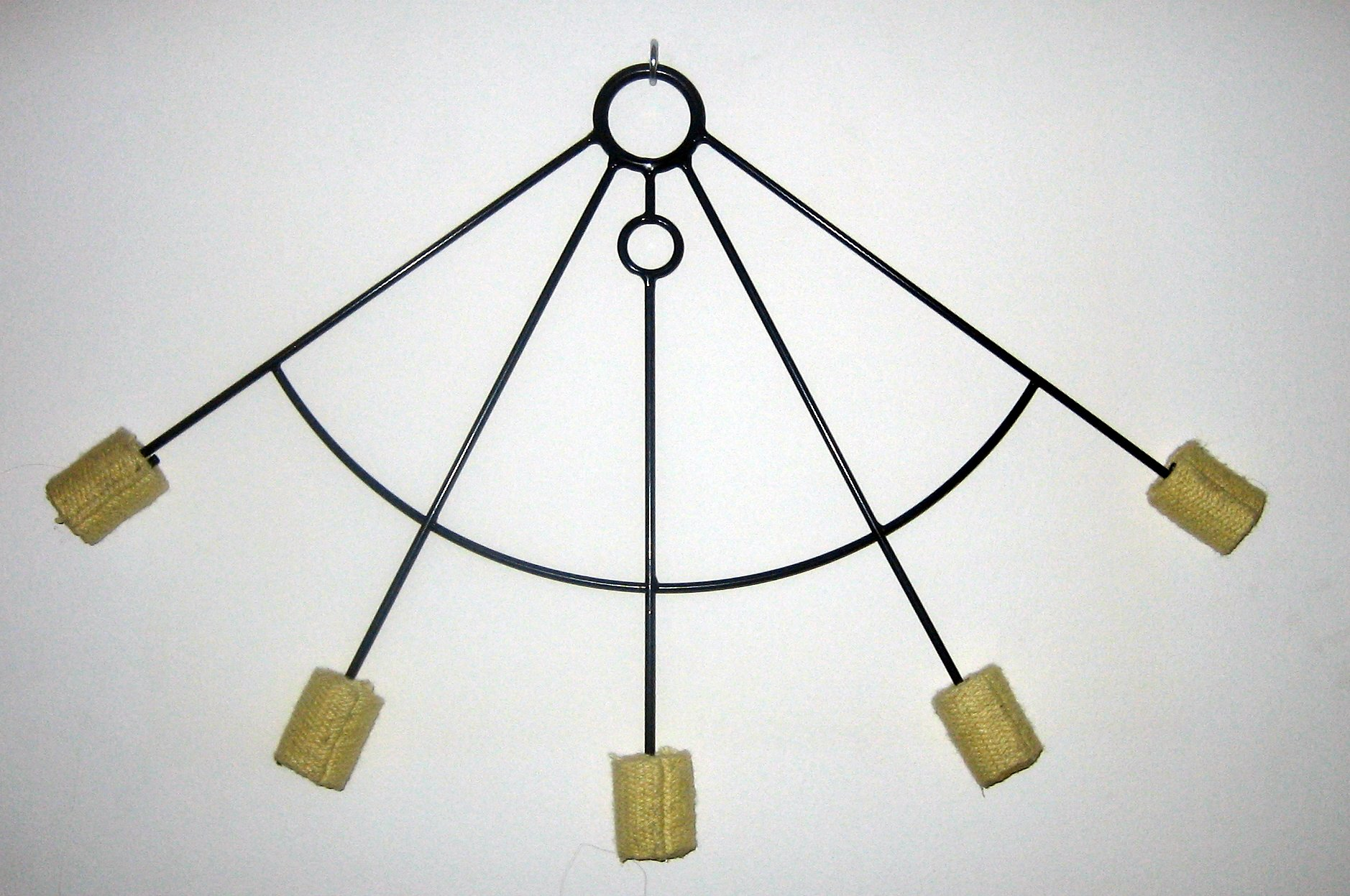

A fire fan is a fan shaped object usually constructed of non-combustible materials such as welded metal and Kevlar wick that is set alight. They are used for fire performance.

== Types of fire fan performance ==
=== Belly dance ===
Fire fans are often used in belly dance, especially in tribal fusion belly dance styles. Belly dancers typically move fire fans more slowly and in combination with the layered hip and arm dance movements distinctive to the art of belly dance.

=== Tech spinners ===
Tech fire fan spinners use movements similar to those in poi, and often employ faster spinning and more complex tricks using the fans. Many movements in poi can be translated into fans, such as 3 beat weaves, flowers, etc. Fire fans can also be used in ways similar to small double hoops. However, there are some moves that are unique to fans, such as choo choos.

=== Belly dance / tech combination ===
Some fire fan performers combine the slower, more graceful, more dance-centric moves of belly dance with the faster, more trick-oriented moves of tech spinners to create a hybrid style of performance.

== Types of fire fans ==
=== Torch wick ===
Typically built with anywhere between 3 and 7 spokes, torch wick fans are a common choice for fan spinners of all levels. They are commonly built of aluminum or steel, each with their own pros and cons. Fans are most often built with at least one ring at the base of the fan, though some fans have multiple rings, or none at all. Rings can differ greatly in size from fan to fan (Diameter: 3–10 cm), and it is not uncommon to see a fan with multiple rings of different sizes. There are also cultural differences. North American tech fan spinners tend to use a small one-finger spinner ring, while Russian tech spinners tend to use a ring large enough to pass the entire hand through.

=== Rope wick ===
The construction of the rope wick fan is similar to that of the torch wick style, but the spokes of the rope fan end in rings, through which a piece of Kevlar rope is strung. Rope fans tend to put off more flame than torch fans. Fueling rope wick fans can be difficult at best without a fueling tray, though it is relatively common practice to pour the fuel over the fan, into the fuel dump, keeping it contained.

=== Collapsible ===
Collapsible fans are hinged at the base, eliminating the finger loops. This can be a disadvantage to those who prefer to spin the fans, as any move involving fingerspins becomes difficult; collapsible fans tend to be used for slower moves and posing as a result, which can be very impressive when they have a large diameter. Some collapsible fans open to a full one hundred eighty degrees (as opposed to static fans, which are generally in the vicinity of ninety degrees). They can be a better fit for more martial-style fan manipulation, and the ability to open and close the fan adds a different dimension to the performance.

While these are the three most common types of fire fans, many people who build their own fire equipment design and prototype creative new fans that are completely their own.

=== LED ===
In venues where fire cannot be used, some performers use LED fans, or fire fan frames that have LED lights instead of wicks.
