= Josephine Girardelli =

Italian circus performer and artist (1780s – 1830)

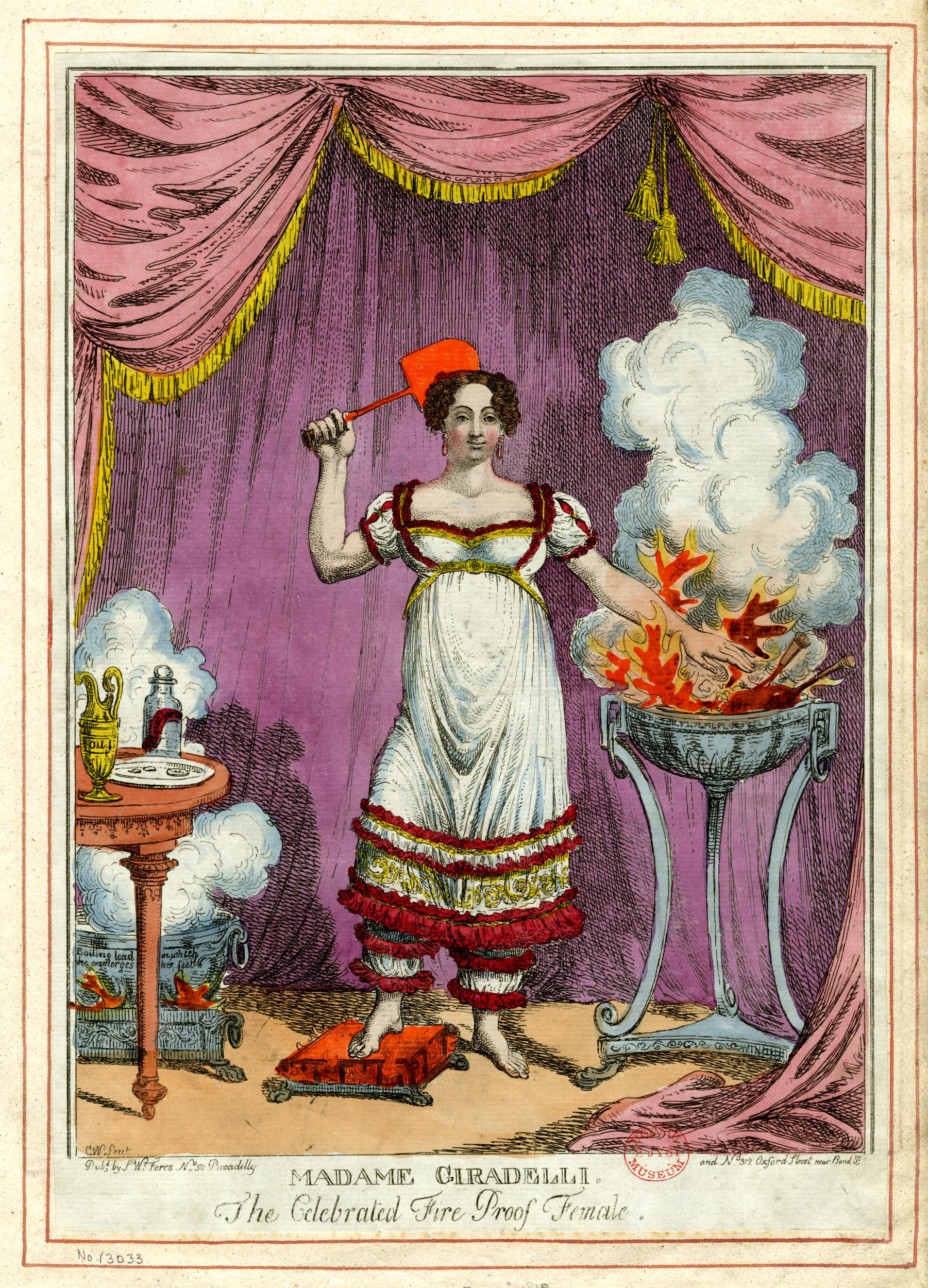
Josephine Girardelli during one of her performances. Caricature from 1818 by Charles Williams. Now in the British Museum.

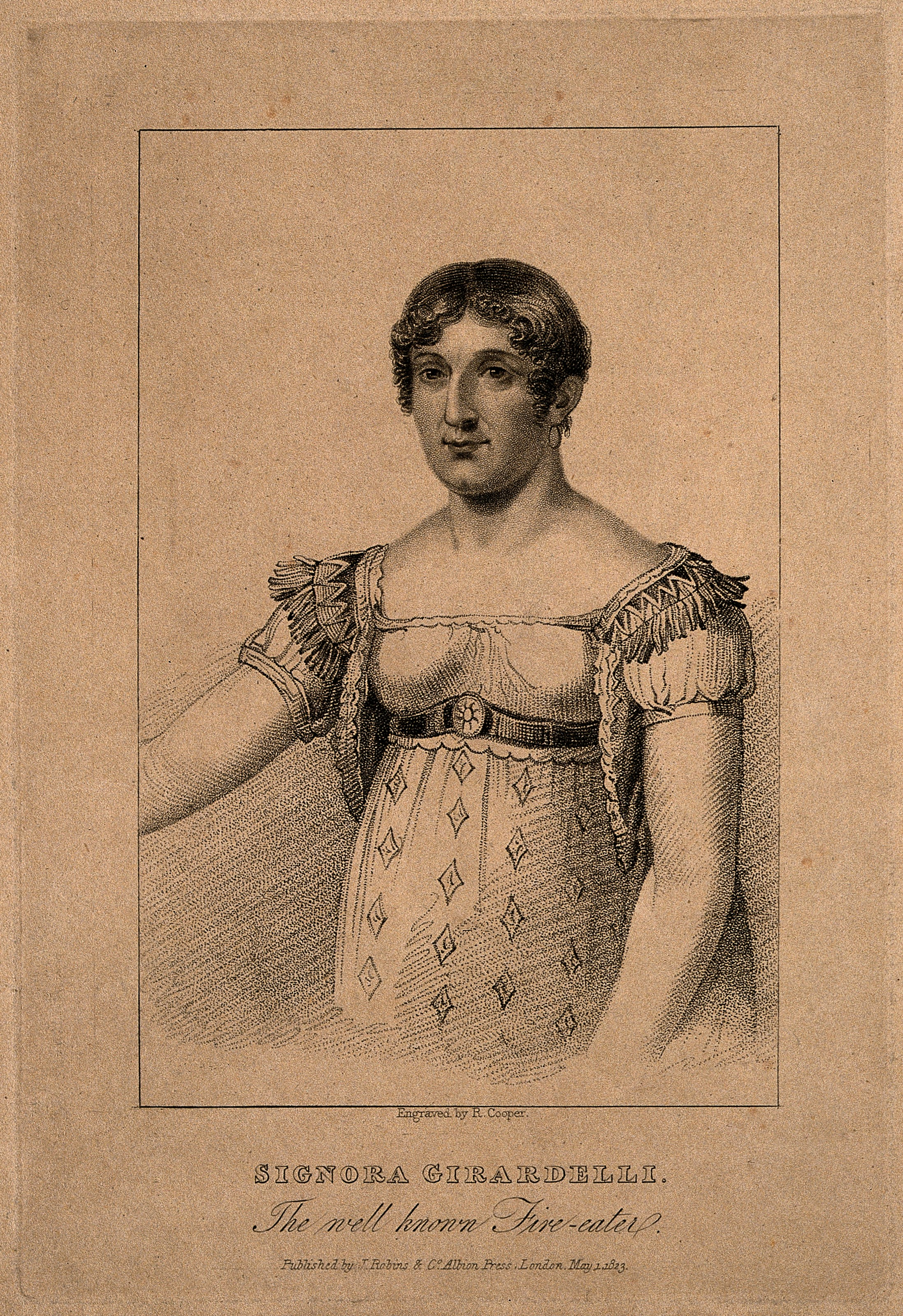
Josephine Girardelli in an engraving by Robert Cooper from 1823.

Josephine Girardelli (1780s – July 6, 1830) was an Italian circus performer and artist. She became famous under the nickname “incombustible lady” in the United Kingdom, demonstrating her resistance to heat in stage shows. She swallowed or exposed herself to red-hot objects and corrosive substances. Newspapers of the time also referred to her as the “Queen of the Fire Eaters.”

== Life ==
Girardelli was probably born in Italy in the 1780s, although she was sometimes called “the incombustible Spaniard, Señor Lionetto” and was at other times believed to be of German descent. According to her burial records, she died in Wakefield on 6 July 1830 at the age of 44, and was therefore likely born in 1785 or 1786.

Girardelli came from continental Europe to England in the 1810s to tour her show. In 1814, she performed in London multiple times a day in New Bond Street. In 1818, she appeared in Newcastle, having previously been in Edinburgh and Glasgow, before working her way down to the south of England. She performed with great success, and was patronised by the royal family, with Prince George, the Prince Regent and future George IV, apparently having taken an interest in her performances.

However, that success declined toward the end of the 1820s, and in 1829 the Girardellis sold tickets for their show in Sheffield at a quarter of the normal price. In addition to the shows, Girardelli organized exhibitions of wax figures she had created, depicting personalities such as the Duke of Wellington, Napoleon, and the recently executed murderers Burke and Hare. At this stage of her career, Girardelli probably devoted herself more to sculpture than to fire shows.

Despite the sensation her performances caused, and the attention her tricks attracted from skeptics and other performers, it was never discovered during her lifetime how she managed not to burn herself in her acts. Girardelli herself claimed to use a "secret composition" applied to the skin that protected her from lasting injury. According to Edinburgh Magazine, she discovered the recipe in the papers and books of her father Odhelius, a celebrated professor of chemistry at Munich. The scientists of the time however, rejected this possibility, since there was no substance capable of protecting the skin for any extended period against red-hot objects or open flames.

She allegedly left England while still famous, and the documentation of her life appears to end there, although burial records show Josephine Girardelli, wife of Simo Girardelli, dying in Wakefield on 6 July 1830 at the age of 44.

== Performances ==
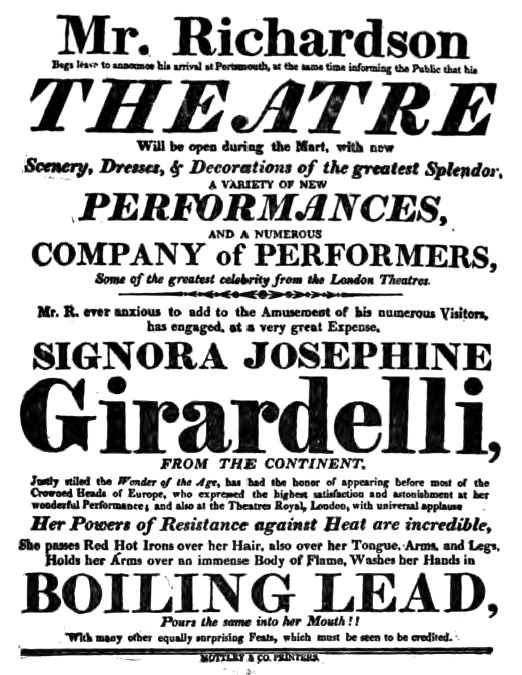
Announcement for Girardelli's show

The performances typically began with Girardelli rinsing her mouth with a substance presented as nitric acid. After a few seconds, she spat the substance onto an iron plate, which began to corrode, in order to prove that it really was acid. She then took a pan of hot oil, fried an egg in it, and drank the hot oil or spat it out in flames to show the audience that it was indeed oil. In another act, a spectator was invited to imprint a letter with molten sealing wax from Girardelli's mouth.

Another trick involved dipping her hands into molten lead and drinking part of it, after which small coin-sized solidified pieces came out of her mouth. The mouth was not the only part of her body that seemed fireproof. She heated a shovel to a very high temperature, pressed it against her hair and arms and showed that they remained unchanged. To finish, she then licked the shovel and tried to convey to the audience the sound of her tongue burning on the red-hot metal.

She will without the least symptom of pain put boiling melting lead into her mouth, and emit the same, with the imprint of her teeth thereon; red hot irons will be passed over various parts of her body – will walk over a bar of red-hot iron, with her naked feet – wash her hands in aqua fortis; and put boiling oil into her mouth &c. &c.

— George Smeeton et al.: Memoirs of Signora Josephine Girardelli

== Possible explanations ==
Numerous theories were put forward to explain Girardelli's seemingly superhuman abilities. For example, it was suggested that she replaced molten lead with mercury and the acid with a neutral liquid. Similarly, boiling oil may have been poured over a thin layer of water so that, when heated, steam rose from the water and made the oil appear hotter than it really was. Girardelli then probably heightened the audience's tension during the performance with large bursts of flame, while in reality minimizing the contact time with the red-hot shovel. Some of her other demonstrations may have relied on the Leidenfrost effect, in which an insulating layer of vapor forms between a liquid and a hot surface.

== Literature ==
- "Memoirs of Signora Josephine Girardelli, the Fire Eater.". Biographia Curiosa; or, memoirs of remarkable characters of the reign of George the Third. With their portraits. London: J. Robbins & Company. 1822. pp. 52–54.

== See also ==
- Fire performance
