= Fire and sword =

Fire and Sword or With Fire and Sword may refer to:

== Books ==
- With Fire and Sword, 1884 historical novel by Henryk Sienkiewicz
- Fire and Sword (novel), 2009 historical novel by Simon Scarrow

== Films ==
- Fire and Sword, 1982 German film based on the Tristan and Isolde story
- With Fire and Sword (film), 1999 Polish film based on the Sienkiewicz novel

== Games ==
- With Fire and Sword (wargame), a 1983 simulation of the Thirty Years War
- Mount & Blade: With Fire & Sword, 2011 video game loosely based on the Sienkiewicz novel

== See also ==
- Fire and Steel (disambiguation)
