= Fire and Steel =

Fire and Steel may refer to:

- Fire & Steel – Blades, Arms and Awesomeness, a Canadian supplier for theatrical and cosplay props
- Working with Fire and Steel – Possible Pop Songs Volume Two, a 1983 album by China Crisis
- Fire and Steel (film), a 1927 American silent action film
- Fire & Steel, a 1978 board game
- Fire and Steel, a lobby track in the video game Fortnite: Battle Royale
