= Flame projector =

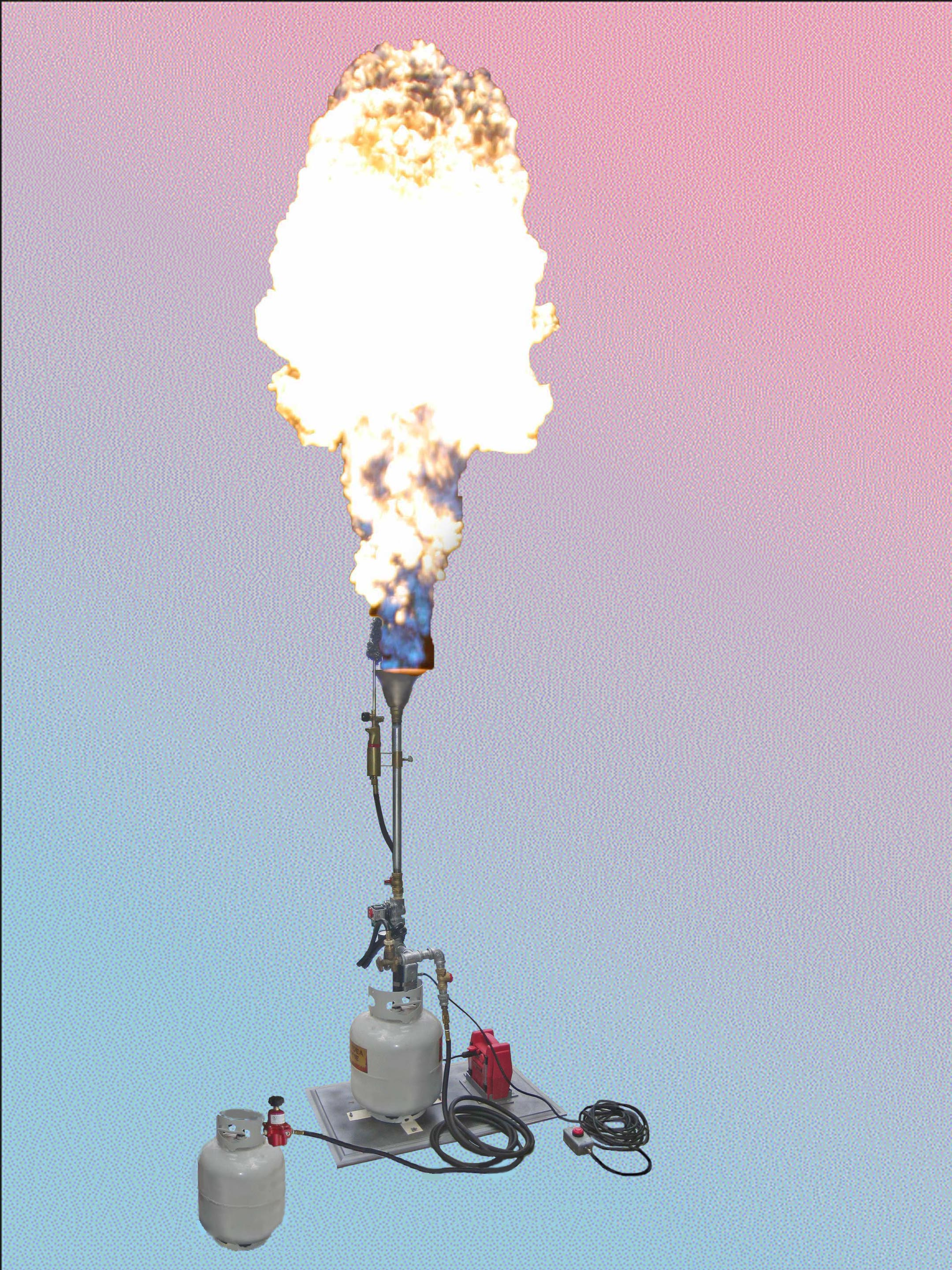
a flame projector

In pyrotechnics, a flame projector is a special effects device that projects a column of flame upwards, for a short, determined and controllable, period, usually on the order of a few seconds. The simplest form of flame projector is simply a vertical tube mounted on a base, containing powder and a hole for an electric match.

Flame projectors can produce flames of different colours by simply adding a colouring agent. Potassium compounds make purple compounds, for instance. Lithium and strontium are red, sodium is bright yellow, copper and boron compounds are blue or green.
