= Freestyle nunchaku =

Freestyle nunchaku refers to the use of the nunchaku weapon (used in martial arts and popularised by Bruce Lee and other martial artists) in a more visually stunning, rather than combative way. Nunchaku-do competitions are now held where marks are awarded based upon visual display rather than predefined kata.

There is a community of freestyle practitioners from around the world who, through collective experimentation and exploration, have compiled a comprehensive breakdown of freestyle and its parts.

== Physical Competitions ==
Freestyle is one of the disciplines of Nunchaku-Do (a sport based upon nunchaku combat freestyle and kata organized by the Nunchaku International Academy, North American Nunchaku Association, and the Stichting Nunchaku Nederland/World Nunchaku Association) freestyle routines are generally judged on the following criteria.

- Pace and rhythm
- Consistency of speed
- Variation in techniques
- Control and movement
- Use of double nunchaku
- One risk element with one nunchaku
- One risk element with two nunchaku
- Dropping the nunchaku
- Uniqueness and creativeness in composition
- Visual aestheticity of the entire presentation
- Application on the entire competition field
- Time span of the freestyle
- Showmanship and entertainment
- Budo/Wushu spirit

== International Online Tournaments & Battles ==
The general interest in freestyle nunchaku has, concurrently with the increasing possibilities of sharing skills and techniques that online video sharing communities such provide, expanded to the point where a freestyle nunchaku movement autonomous from the World Nunchaku Association has formed.

The Freestyle Nunchaku Forum (FNF) holds tournaments that all members can participate in. These tournaments are held by participants submitting videos that adhere certain rules (which are relaxed, such as length of video and whether other weapons freestyle can be used). When all of the videos are in, members of the forum can vote on who they think is better. The annual "Chuck Off" has varied categories such as: Singles, Doubles, Fire and Glow, and Director. Similarly, the annual "World Cup" welcomes all sort of nunchaku entries, where editing is allowed and compilations are encouraged to present the highest technicality, difficulty, and visual astonishability the player can possibly bring.

The forum also hosts what are called Ladder Battles. Here participants are ranked by number. Those wanting to move up the ranks can challenge any of the three people above them to a "battle". The two people involved submit videos of their freestyle that adhere to certain rules that are agreed upon. Then, forum members have a certain length of time to vote on who they think is the best.

=== Major Tournaments ===
Tournament title	AKA	Founding year	Total rounds	Edit-free
Freestyle Nunchaku Forum World Cup (Previously Freestyle Nunchaku World Cup)	WC (Previously FNWC)	2008	1	No
Golden Combo Tournament	GCT	2019	2	Yes
Nunchaku Digit Challenge	NDC	2021	1	Yes

=== List of Champions ===
Year	FNF World Cup	Golden Combo Tournament	Nunchaku Digit Challenge
2008	Michael Magi France	-	-
2009	Matt Csesznyak England	-	-
2010	Levi Levier Romania	-	-
2011	Stéphane Oberlé France	-	-
2012	Renato Monte Brazil	-	-
2013	Sweetwind China	-	-
2014	Tanguy Guinchard Switzerland	-	-
2015	Levi Levier Romania	-	-
2016	Vladmir Boolatov Russia	-	-
2017	Howard Lee Philippines Danil Mushinsky Russia	-	-
2018	Naufal Bintang Indonesia	-	-
2019	JJ Nunchaku Belgium	Tanguy Guinchard Switzerland	-
2020	Naufal Bintang Indonesia	Andrea Barra Italy	-
2021	JJ Nunchaku Belgium	Andrea Barra Italy	JJ Nunchaku Belgium
2022	JJ Nunchaku Belgium	Ali Mirani Iran	JJ Nunchaku Belgium
2023	JJ Nunchaku Belgium	Daria Kascheeva Russia	JJ Nunchaku Belgium
2024	JJ Nunchaku Belgium	Daria Kascheeva Russia	Alvin Cheng Hong Kong
2025	Devin Arkfeld United States	Cristian Rodríguez Chile	Alvin Cheng Hong Kong
2026	Alvin Cheng Hong Kong	-	Alvin Cheng Hong Kong

=== Champions with Multiple Wins ===
Total	Champion	WC	GCT	NDC
8	JJ Nunchaku Belgium	5	0	3
4	Alvin Cheng Hong Kong	1	0	3
2	Levi Levier Romania	2	0	0
2	Naufal Bintang Indonesia	2	0	0
2	Tanguy Guinchard Switzerland	1	1	0
2	Daria Kascheeva Russia	0	2	0

=== Countries Champion Count ===
Total	Country	WC	GCT	NDC
8	Belgium	5	0	3
5	China (including Hong Kong)	2	0	3
4	Russia	2	2	0
2	(France) France	2	0	0
2	Indonesia	2	0	0
2	Romania	2	0	0
2	Switzerland	1	1	0
1	Brazil	1	0	0
1	England	1	0	0
1	Philippines	1	0	0
1	(United States) USA	1	0	0
1	Chile	0	1	0
1	(Iran) Iran	0	1	0
1	Italy	0	1	0

=== List of World Cup Podium Finishers ===
Year	(gold) 1st Place	(silver) 2nd Place	(bronze) 3rd Place	4th Place	5th Place
2008	(France) SixtyFourWarrior/Michael Magi	(United States) NinjaRob	(United States) ChuckNasty	(Poland) Lokos	-
2009	(England) Matt-Chez/Matt Cseszynak	(United States) Yetibutt	(France) SetsunaJulien/Julien Cayla (United States) Kriztov/Chris Campbell	-	-
2010	(Romania) Levi/Levi Levier	(France) 67Steph67/Stéphane Orberlé	(United States) Yetibutt	-	-
2011	(France) 67Steph67/Stéphane Orberlé	(Philippines) psionics/Howard Lee	(China) SweetWind	(France) SetsunaJulien/Julien Cayla	-
2012	(Brazil) Renato Monte	(France) 67Steph67/Stéphane Orberlé	(France) SetsunaJulien/Julien Cayla	(France) nunchakstyle010/Ncs Xtricks	-
2013	(China) SweetWind	(France) 67Steph67/Stéphane Orberlé	(Brazil) Renato Monte	-	-
2014	(Switzerland) Monkey-of-Nunchaku/Tanguy Guinchard	(China) SweetWind	(Algeria) Monster Nunchaku ADC	(France) nunchakstyle010/Ncs Xtricks	-
2015	(Romania) Levi/Levi Levier	(China) Heyson Xu (Switzerland) Tanguy Guinchard	(Russia) Alexey Bobrishev	(France) nunchakstyle010/Ncs Xtricls	-
2016	(Russia) Vladmir Boolatov	(Philippines) psionics/Howard Lee	(Algeria) Monster Nunchaku ADC	(Netherlands) Ricardo de Jong	(Russia) van3D
2017	(Russia) Danil Mushinsky (Philippines) psionics/Howard Lee	(Indonesia) Naufal Bintang (Algeria) Monster Nunchaku ADC	(Russia) Shade (Netherlands) Ricardo de Jong	(Austria) nachtschattenvogi	-
2018	(Indonesia) Naufal Bintang	(China) SweetWind (Algeria) Monster Nunchaku ADC (Philippines) psionics/Howard Lee	(Vietnam) Gia Huy (Indonesia) Arjuna Synyster Jr.	(Indonesia) Jordan Phang 27	-
2019	(Belgium) JJ Nunchaku	(China) SweetWind	(Indonesia) Naufal Bintang	-	-
2020	(Indonesia) Naufal Bintang	(China) SweetWind (United States) Devmode/Devin Arkfeld	(Vietnam) kungfu_nunchaku (Philippines) psionics/Howard Lee	-	-
2021	(Belgium) JJ Nunchaku	(Indonesia) Naufal Bintang	(China) SweetWind	(Indonesia) wesyleywest/Wesley Gosali	-
2022	(Belgium) JJ Nunchaku	(Indonesia) Naufal Bintang	(China) SweetWind	(France) Jessy Denis	-
2023	(Belgium) JJ Nunchaku	(Chile) Cristian Rodríguez	(China) Lin Qing Fu	-	-
2024	(Belgium) JJ Nunchaku	(Russia) Daria Kascheeva	(Chile) Cristian Rodríguez	-	-
2025	(United States) Devin Arkfeld	(France) Jessy Denis	(Iran) Aydin Zoghi	-	-
2026	(Hong Kong) Alvin Cheng	(Chile) Cristian Rodríguez	(Russia) Daria Kascheeva	-	-

=== List of Golden Combo Tournament Podium Finishers ===
Year		(gold) 1st Place	(silver) 2nd Place	(bronze) 3rd Place
2019	Q1	(Switzerland) Tanguy Guinchard	(Russia) Sergey Voronoy	(Finland) Tatu Kalliömaki
2019	Q2	(Indonesia) Naufal Bintang	(United States) Devin Arkfeld	(Poland) Przemek Walczak
2019	Q3	(China) Lin Qing Fu	(Tanzania) Jukensh Nunchuks	(Italy) Andrea Bharrai
2019	Finals	(Switzerland) Tanguy Guinchard	(United States) Devin Arkfeld	(China) Lin Qing Fu
2021	Q1	(Indonesia) Naufal Bintang	(Finland) Tatu Kalliömaki	(Indonesia) Arjuna DImsyam
2021	Q2	(United States) Devin Arkfeld	(Poland) Adrian Grabski	(Indonesia) Miko Boby Pratama
2021	QF	(Indonesia) Naufal Bintang	(Indonesia) Muh. Farhan AR	(Indonesia) Arjuna Dimsyam
2021	SF	(Indonesia) Naufal Bintang	(Chile) Cristian Rodríguez	(Iran) Ali Mirani
2021	Finals	(Italy) Andrea Barra	(Indonesia) Naufal Bintang	(Chile) Cristian Rodríguez
2022	Q1	(Iran) Yasin Kazmi	(France) Dorian Geradin	(Iran) Alireza Naseri
2022	Q2	(Chile) Cristian Rodríguez	(Indonesia) Arjuna Dimsyam	(France) Romain Pernot
2022	SF	(Chile) Cristian Rodríguez	(Indonesia) Naufal Bintang	(France) Dorian Geradin
2022	Finals	(Iran) Ali Mirani	(France) Romain Pernot	(Chile) Cristian Rodríguez
2023	QR	(Chile) Cristian Rodríguez	(Russia) Daria Kascheeva	(Iran) Ali Mirani
2023	SF	(Russia) Daria Kascheeva	(Chile) Cristian Rodríguez	(France) Romain Pernot
2023	Finals	(Russia) Daria Kascheeva	(Iran) Aydin Zoghi	(Chile) Cristian Rodríguez
2024	QR	(Iran) Aydin Zoghi	(France) Jessy Denis	(Russia) Daria Kascheeva
2024	Finals	(Russia) Daria Kascheeva	(Iran) Aydin Zoghi	(Netherlands) Perry Vollering
2025	QR	(Chile) Cristian Rodríguez	(United States) Devin Arkfeld	(Italy) Andrea Barra
2025	Finals	(Chile) Cristian Rodríguez	(Italy) Andrea Barra	(France) Jessy Denis

=== List of Nunchaku Digit Challenge Podium Finishers ===
Year	(gold) 1st Place	(silver) 2nd Place	(bronze) 3rd Place
2021	(Belgium) JJ Nunchaku	(Indonesia) M. Sajid Ala Muhib	(Indonesia) Andry Wijaya
2022	(Belgium) JJ Nunchaku	(Indonesia) Naufal Bintang	(Hong Kong) River Lin
2023	(Belgium) JJ Nunchaku	(Russia) Daria Kascheeva	(Chile) Cristian Rodríguez
2024	(Hong Kong) Alvin Cheng	(United States) Bryon McCroskey	(England) Ben Tucker
2025	(Hong Kong) Alvin Cheng	(United States) Bryon McCroskey	(Hong Kong) River Lin
2026	(Hong Kong) Alvin Cheng	(United States) Bryon McCroskey	(France) Jessy Denis

=== Countries Podium Finishers Count ===
Total	Country	WC	GCT	NDC
17	China (including Hong Kong)	11	1	5
16	France	13	2	1
13	Indonesia	9	1	3
11	(United States) USA	7	1	3
9	Russia	6	2	1
8	Belgium	5	0	3
7	Chile	3	4	0
5	Philippines	5	0	0
4	Algeria	4	0	0
4	Iran	1	3	0
3	(Netherlands) Netherlands	2	1	0
3	Switzerland	2	1	0
2	Brazil	2	0	0
2	Romania	2	0	0
2	England	1	0	1
2	Vietnam	2	0	0
2	(Italy) Italy	0	2	0
1	Austria	1	0	0
1	Poland	1	0	0
