= Flaming sword (effect) =

Sword coated with fuel to being set on fire

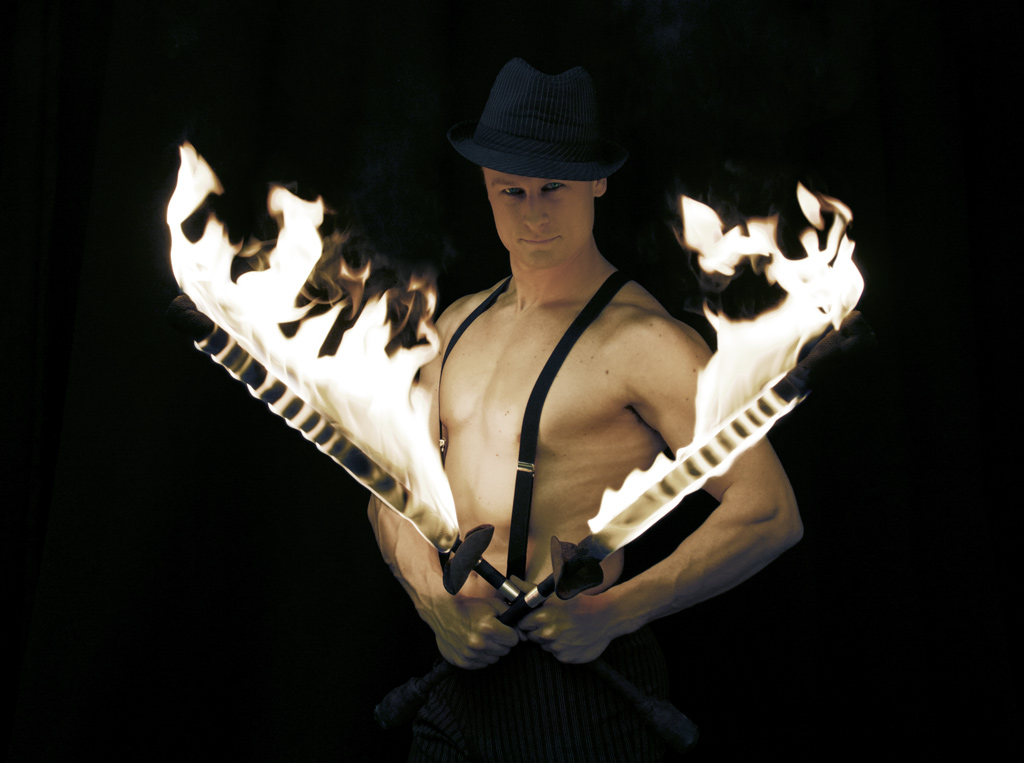
A fire swords performer

A flaming sword is a sword that has been coated with some type of fuel, with the fuel being set on fire. This is most widely done for entertainment purposes in circuses, magic performances and other forms of display as a side act of sword dance, sword swallowers, fire eating, etc.

== In popular culture ==
In HBO's Game of Thrones television series, the flaming sword effect was achieved with a real sword that was milled with channels, with dura-blanket material inserted. This would then be covered by another layer.

In The Last Witch Hunter, Vin Diesel used a prop flaming sword.

== See also ==
- Fire knife
- Flaming sword (mythology)
- Lightsaber
