= Flaming sword (mythology) =

Supernatural weapon

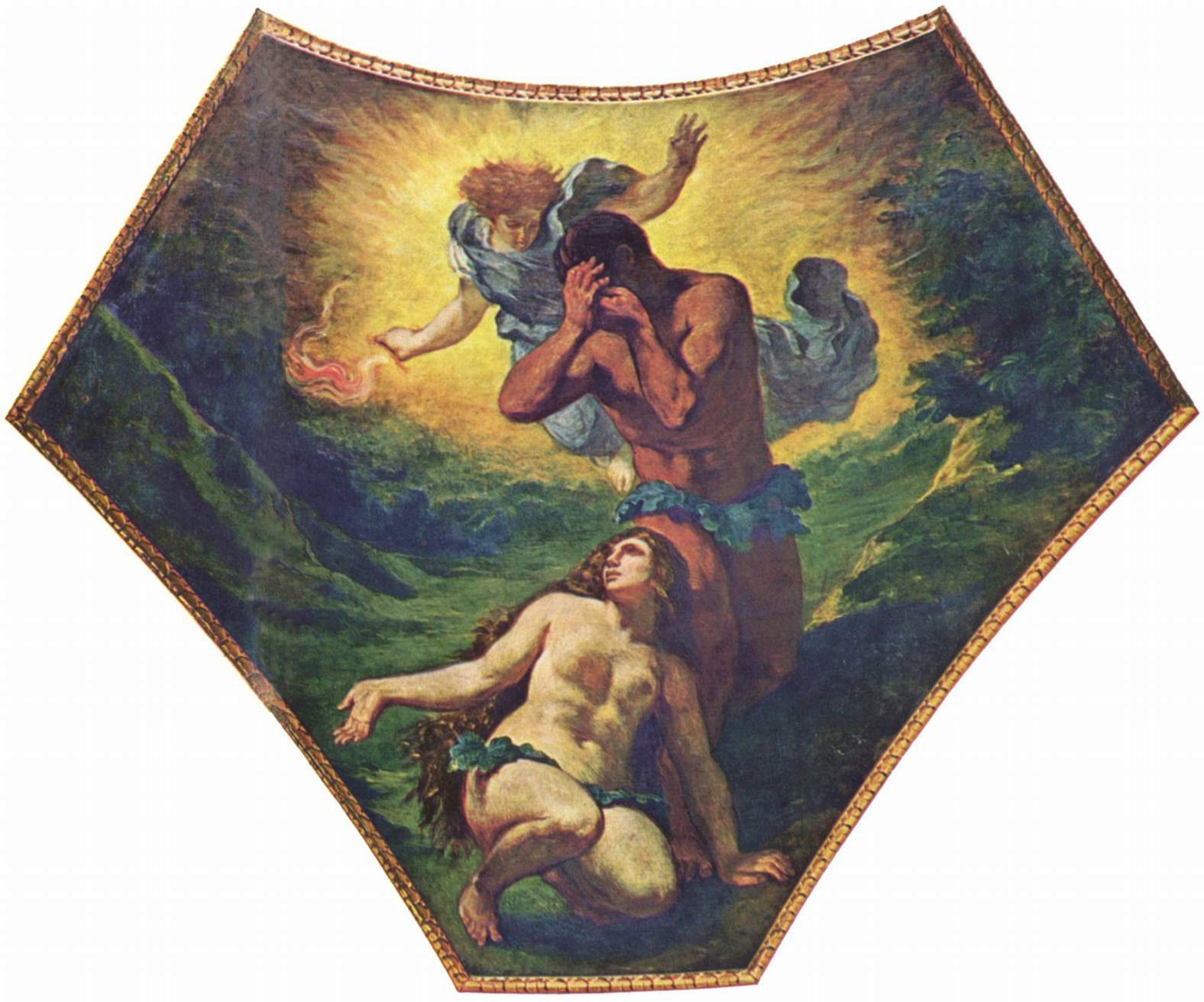
Painting by Ferdinand Victor Eugène Delacroix of an angel (Camael) expelling Adam and Eve with a flaming sword. According to Robert Means Lawrence, Arthur de Bles, and R.L. Giles, the angel who cast Adam and Eve out of Paradise was said to be Jophiel.

A flaming sword is a sword which is glowing with a flame which is produced by some supernatural power.

== Abrahamic sources ==
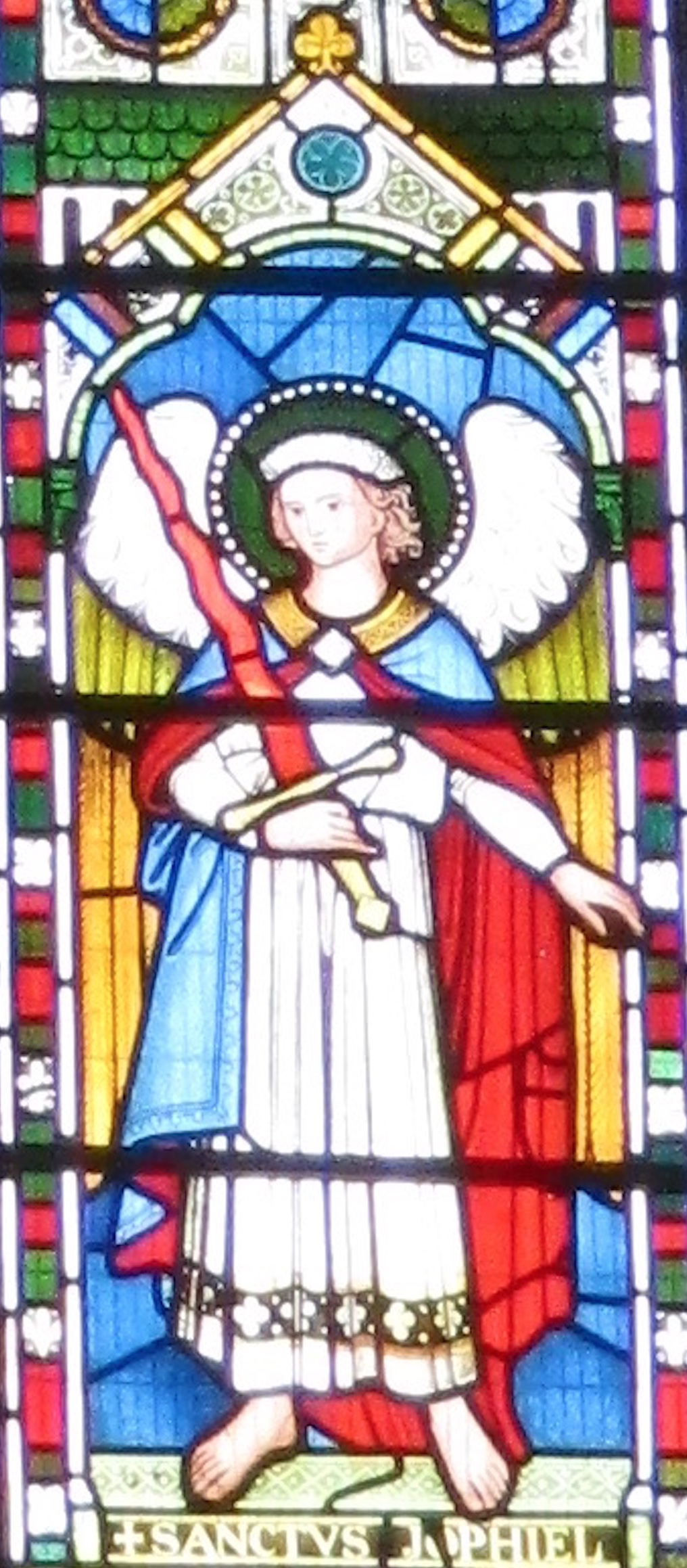
St Jophiel, stained glass at St Michael's Church, Brighton.

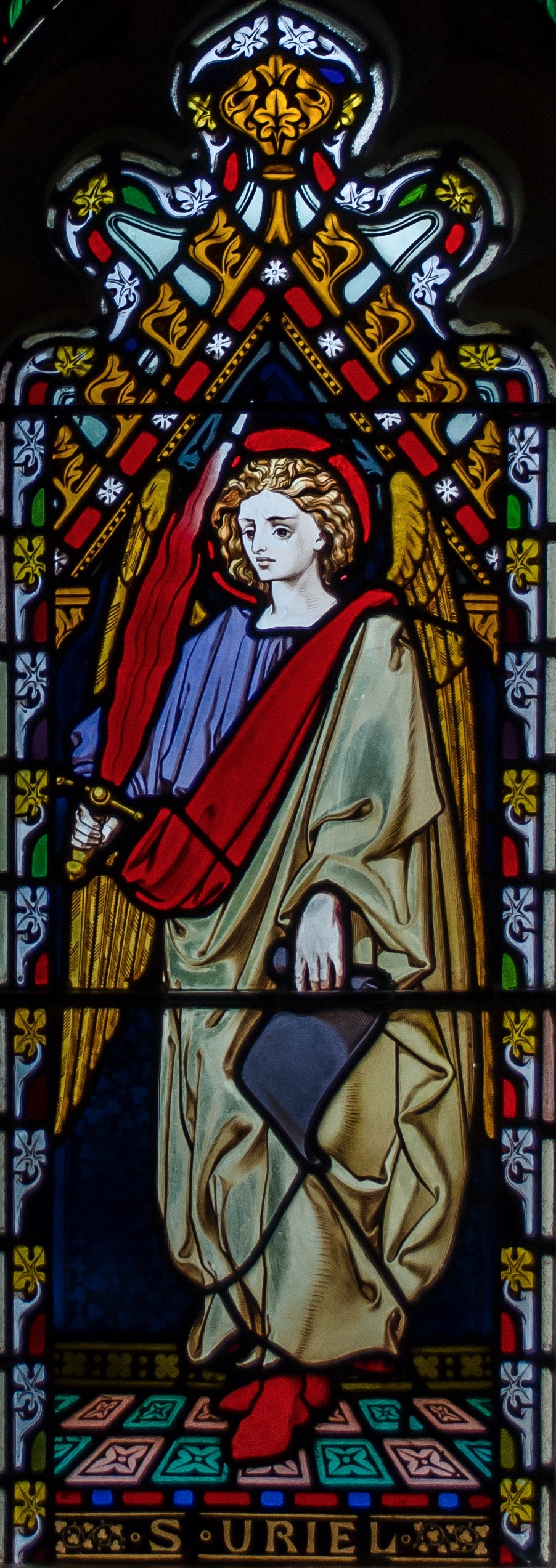
St Uriel, stained glass at St James' Church, Ewhurst Green.

The flaming sword is an attribute of both Jophiel and Uriel.

According to the Bible, a flaming sword (Hebrew: להט החרב lahat chereb or literally "flame of the whirling sword" Hebrew: להט החרב המתהפכת lahaṭ haḥereb hammithappeket) was entrusted to the cherubim by God to guard the gates of Paradise after Adam and Eve were banished (Genesis 3:24). (Note: Brown–Driver–Briggs, cited by Hendel.) Scholars have variously interpreted the sword as a weapon of the cherubim, as lightning, as a metaphor, as an independent divine being, or even as a figurative description of bladed chariot wheels.

Dumah is an angel mentioned in Rabbinical literature and popular in Yiddish folklore. Isaac Bashevis Singer's Short Friday (1964), a collection of stories, mentions Dumah as a "thousand-eyed angel of death, armed with a flaming sword". The sword is otherwise associated with various angels, such as the archangel Uriel, Camael or Jophiel.

=== Christianity ===
Eastern Orthodox tradition (as expressed in the Lenten Triodion) says that after Jesus was crucified and resurrected, the flaming sword was removed from the Garden of Eden, making it possible for humanity to re-enter Paradise.

== Gnosticism ==
The ancient Gnostic codex On the Origin of the World predicts that the kings under the archons will be drunken from the flaming sword during the end times.

== Germanic mythology ==
In Norse mythology, the weapon wielded by the giant Surtr is referred to as a "flaming sword" (Old Norse: loganda sverð) by Snorri Sturluson in Gylfaginning 4, of the Prose Edda. Snorri immediately afterwards quotes a stanza from his poetic source, (Völuspá 52), where it is stated that Surt has fire with him, and that his sword shines with the "sun of the gods of the slain". However, it has been argued that the poem might be stressing the fiery glare of Surtr himself more than the sword. The relevant kenning from the quoted poem, svigi lævi ("destruction of twigs"), is usually interpreted to mean "fire". (Note: In the original text, með svigi lævi "with the destruction of twigs", in the dative case.) However, Henrik Schück interpreted the kenning as referring to a sword, emending the phrase to svigi læva to identify it with the sword Lævateinn in Fjölsvinnsmál. Snorri paraphrases the strophe of the poem a second time in Gylfaginning 51, merely saying: "Surt rides first, and before him and after him is burning fire", afterwards requoting more extensively around the same strophe (Völuspá 48–56). The possibility that this sword imagery was inspired by Christian writings have been speculated.

== Celtic legend ==
According to the Welsh triads, the Dyrnwyn ('White-Hilt'), one of the Thirteen Treasures of the Island of Britain, is said to be a powerful sword belonging to Rhydderch Hael, one of the Three Generous Men of Britain. When drawn by a worthy or well-born man, the entire blade would blaze with fire. Rhydderch was never reluctant to hand the weapon to anyone, hence his nickname; Hael (the Generous), but as soon as the recipients learned of its peculiar properties, they always rejected the sword.

== Hindu and Buddhist (Dharmic) sources ==
The deity Acala (known as Fudō Myōō in Japan) is depicted in Buddhist art holding a sword which may or may not be flaming and sometimes described only generically as a treasure sword (宝剣, hōken) or as a vajra-sword (金剛剣, kongō-ken), as the pommel of the sword is shaped like a talon-like vajra (金剛杵, kongō-sho).

In Hinduism, Kalki (Sanskrit: कल्कि) also called Kalkin or Karki, is the prophesied tenth and final incarnation of Hindu God Vishnu to end the Kali Yuga, one of the four periods in the endless cycle of existence (Krita) in Vaishnavism cosmology. The end of Kali Yuga states this will usher in the new epoch of Satya Yuga in the cycle of existence, until the MahaPralaya (the Great Dissolution of the Universe). Kalki is described in the Puranas as the avatar who rejuvenates existence by ending the darkest and destructive period to remove adharma and ushering in the Satya Yuga, while riding a white horse with a fiery sword. The description and details of Kalki are different among various Puranas.

In Vajrayana/Tibetan Buddhism, the flaming sword represents specifically wisdom piercing ignosis, and is depicted in the right hand of any Buddha in a T'hangka painting, whereas the left side of the same Buddha shows the BEing, instead of DOing, e.g. being the meanings of a particular dharma, as symbolized by a flower springing from their left hand, with some particular dharma text being in the open flower, to their left. Take a look at any such thangka ( pronounced t'hangka, but usually in English spelt thangka, which misleads English readers, because it is hard-T-then-H, not TH sound ) painting, and you will see the left-brain/right-body and right-brain/left-body instruction is consistent, and particularly see Manjushri for an example of the "flaming sword which pierces ignosis". It can be represented as a sword made of flame, or as a conventional metal sword with flames about it, either way.

== See also ==
- Flame-bladed sword
- Flaming sword (effect)
- Lightsaber
- Newton's flaming laser sword, a philosophical principle
