= List of Ressha Sentai ToQger episodes =

This is a list of episodes of the 2014-2015 Super Sentai series Ressha Sentai ToQger. As the motif for ToQger is trains, the episodes are called "stations" (駅, eki). The first episode is not numbered "Station 1" but is called "Starting Station" (始発駅, Shihatsueki) and the finale is called "Terminal Station" (終着駅, Shūchakueki).

== Episodes ==
No.	Title	Written by	Original release date
1	"Let's Go on the Express Ressha"; Transliteration: "Tokkyū Ressha de Ikō" (Japanese: 特急烈車で行こう)	Yasuko Kobayashi	February 16, 2014
Children with strong imagination are being kidnapped by the Shadow Creep Bag Shadow at the Dark Station Gakisuteyama Station and taken aboard one of the Shadow Line's evil Cryner trains. Much to the monster's surprise, amongst the captives is a sleeping young man. The young man awakens and introduces himself as Right, confronting Bag Shadow until the prismatic Rainbow Line and its Ressha trains appear, along with four heroes who call themselves the "ToQgers". The ToQgers fight the monster and his army of Clothes, but are forced to flee when Right steps into the battle and is knocked out by Bag Shadow. Right later awakens inside the Ressha and recognizes the ToQgers as his childhood friends, Tokatti, Mio, Hikari, and Kagura. He is also greeted by an enigmatic person called the Conductor and his sidekick Ticket who inform him that because of their high imaginations, they were chosen by the Rainbow Line to become the ToQgers in order to stop the Shadow Line's plans to envelop the world in darkness. Soon after, the Cryner is spotted again and Right is the first to jump into action, not even giving time for his friends to give him his ToQ Changer. When his friends catch up to him, Right uses his imagination to deal a punch to Bag Shadow even without transforming. After rescuing the children, all five ToQgers fight together for the first time. During the battle, Right learns that they can switch their powers and weapons between themselves and they make use of it to confound their enemies, alternating their attacks randomly and defeating all the Clothes until the Conductor forcibly undoes the switches, claiming that such an ability must be only used in emergencies. The ToQgers then finish the monster with the Renketsu Bazooka, but it later enlarges itself with the power of darkness, prompting the Conductor to switch control of the Ressha temporarily for the ToQgers to form the giant robot ToQ-Oh, using it to destroy Bag Shadow for good with the Fumikiriken Ressha Slash. Back from their first victory, Right and his friends are astonished when Ticket lets slip that the main reason for them being chosen to become the ToQgers is because they are as good as dead.
2	"We Are Here"; Transliteration: "Oretachi wa Koko ni Iru" (Japanese: 俺たちはここにいる)	Yasuko Kobayashi	February 23, 2014
Still in shock at Ticket's revelation, the ToQgers attempt to inquire about this further when the Rainbow Line's resident attendant, the female robot Wagon, appears with food for them. During their meal, Right and the others realize that they have no personal memories except from those of their childhood together. Soon after, they arrive at one of the Shadow Line's Dark Stations: Kettougahara. After being informed that the Shadow Line's plan is to expand their domains by harnessing the negative feelings of humans until enveloping the whole world, the ToQgers disembark at Kettougahara(決闘ヶ原 "Duel Field") and soon learn that the residents there are forced to duel each other regularly by the monster Sabre Shadow. Refusing to fight anyone, the ToQgers are attacked by Sabre Shadow and his minions, defending a boy named Yota who also has not dueled as ordered until they reveal that they do not know the station's rules, prompting the monster to retreat for the time being. Yota then reveals that since the neighborhood was overtaken by the Shadow Line, the residents keep fighting each other, behaving as if they are dead. Certain that it must be related to their current condition, Right decides to confront Sabre Shadow. Hikari refuses, claiming that there is nothing for them in helping others if they are really dead. Right disagrees, believing that doing so may also bring some benefit to them as well. The time comes for another duel and instead of having the residents duel each other, ToQ 1gou steps in to duel Sabre Shadow while his friends fight the Clothes under him. To make things more interesting, Sabre Shadow summons a Cryner and ToQ 1gou gives chase, mounted on his Red Ressha, assisted by ToQ 4gou driving the Green Ressha. The duel ends with Sabre Shadow defeated, but when the monster enlarges itself, the other ToQgers arrive with their Ressha to form ToQ-Oh. The giant monster then proposes a duel with firearms and the ToQgers agree. However, in the last moment, Sabre Shadow attempts to obtain an unfair advantage by shooting early. The heroes dodge the shot by decoupling and recoupling their Ressha in an instant, giving an opening to finish him. With the station back to its normal state as Nozomigahara (望ヶ原 "Wish/Hope Field"), the ToQgers return to the Rainbow Line. They conclude that their lack of memories must be because they are from one of the neighborhoods attacked by the Shadow Line, and are certain that they will return to normal once their station is cleansed of all darkness. The Conductor says that they are right, but Ticket contradicts him, only adding to their confusion.
3	"Risking Everything After Reaching the Wrong Conclusion"; Transliteration: "Omoikondara Inochigake" (Japanese: 思いこんだら命がけ)	Yasuko Kobayashi	March 2, 2014
The Conductor and Ticket explain that while the ToQgers must be indeed rescued by the Rainbow Line from one of the train stations conquered by the Shadow Line because of their Imagination, it does not explain why they have lost their memories. Right declares that despite being offered the chance to quit being a ToQger and look for their hometown, he decides to move forward to stop the Shadow Line's plans. Later that night, a worried Kagura meets Right and expresses her will to disembark from the Rainbow Line in order to look for their home, and her friend encourages her, claiming that she must follow her heart just like he is doing. While stopping at Heiwadani Station, Kagura jumps off the train for a while just to miss it when it departs, leaving her behind. Soon after, the Shadow Creep Chain Shadow arrives at one of the Shadow Line's trains and changes Heiwadani Station into Shinotani Dark Station, starting his plan to envelop the entire area in darkness and Kagura decides to confront him by herself, just to be defeated and trapped inside his coffin. The next day, the other ToQgers realize that Kagura was missing and return to Heiwadani Station to look for her. After some children are trapped inside Chain Shadow coffin as well, Right and the others appear to confront him, and ToQ 1gou jumps into the coffin to rescue Kagura, after realizing that she was one of Chain Shadow's captives. However, Kagura refuses assistance and breaks out of the coffin with her own Imagination power, rescuing the children as well. The empowered ToQ 5gou then switches her Ressha with ToQ 1gou and overpowers Chain Shadow by herself until Right remembers that Kagura used to go overboard with her Imagination at the risk of her own safety and decides to stop her with the others' help. After falling into a nearby pool, Kagura has a glimpse of her memories from her childhood and remembers that their hometown is somewhere by the sea. Back in the battle, the ToQgers bring down Chain Shadow with the Renketsu Bazooka and later finish him for good with ToQ-Oh after it enlarges itself, managing to use the Red Ressha to break out of Chain Shadow's coffin when he traps them. With their memories of their town in mind, the ToQgers return to the Rainbow Line to continue their quest to stop the Shadow Line, now certain that it will eventually lead them home.
4	"Be Careful Not to Lose Anything"; Transliteration: "Wasuremono ni Gochūi o" (Japanese: 忘れ物にご注意を)	Yasuko Kobayashi	March 9, 2014
When the ToQgers are informed that they can use their Rainbow Passes as credit cards, they have some time off at a station stop. Meanwhile, General Schwarz, the military leader of the Shadow Line, is interested about the ToQgers' Ressha and wonders if he could learn more about them. Miss Glitta, who is infatuated with him then decides to look for a way to help the general. Once returning from a shopping spree, Tokatti learns that the ToQgers must work to pay for all their expenses with the Rainbow Passes and leaves in a hurry to return all the stuff he bought. Soon after, the next station is taken over by the Shadow Creep Stove Shadow and transformed into the Itaigawa Dark Station. Once the ToQgers assemble to depart, Tokatti realizes that he lost his Rainbow Pass and cannot board the Rainbow Line without it. Mio then stays behind to accompany him while the others rush ahead to stop the monster in his tracks. Once Stove Shadow flees, Mio and Tokatti stay behind again while the rest give chase using the Rainbow Line. Meanwhile, General Schwarz is informed by Glitta, who does not identify herself, about the location of the ToQgers' Ressha and departs there to find them. While crossing a mountain, Tokatti laments about his predicament and wonders if he is dragging down the team because he is not as reliable as the others when Mio trips and falls on a cliff and Tokatti catches her in the nick of time. In that moment, both realize that they lived a similar situation during their childhood and Mio makes use of it to encourage him, as he has already saved her on two different occasions. While cleaning the Ressha, Wagon finds Tokatti's Rainbow Pass and returns it to him. Now reunited with the others, ToQ 2gou and ToQ 3gou exchange their Ressha while the others do the same between themselves to weaken Stove Shadow, before defeating it with the Renketsu Bazooka. When the heroes board ToQ-Oh to fight the enlarged monster, General Schwarz sends two Clothes each riding a Cryner that convert themselves into Cryner Robos. The ToQgers are driven into a corner by the three enemies when Ticket appears to bestow upon them the Shield Ressha which they use to turn the tables and destroy the Cryner Robos before finishing off Stove Shadow with the Fumikiriken Ressha Slash. After the battle, General Schwarz appears and introduces himself to the ToQgers, declaring that he will return on a later occasion to claim their Ressha and flees.
5	"The Missing Other Side of the Tracks"; Transliteration: "Kieta Senro no Mukōgawa" (Japanese: 消えた線路の向こうがわ)	Yasuko Kobayashi	March 16, 2014
Just as the ToQgers are about to have breakfast, the Rainbow Line makes an abrupt stop at a river, as the tracks are interrupted by the massive darkness emanating from the Dark Station ahead. By using their new support Ressha, the CarCarrier Ressha, Right uses one of its Dash Cars to cross the river, but he goes overboard using the power of his Imagination and is knocked out after hitting his head on a rock. The other ToQgers follow soon after, and while looking for their friend, they come across the Shadow Creep Baketsu Shadow, who consumes all of the people's food in Ōmori Station to collect the darkness from its hungry inhabitants, having transformed it into Harapeko Dark Station. The monster flees after confronting the ToQgers while Right awakens and finds that he was rescued and treated by a group of friends that is camping beside a river. However, the group gets angry at Right for taking their last cup of instant noodles which falls on the ground after they fight him to take it back and drive him away. Tokatti and the others appear soon after, looking for their friend, who returns with fish and bamboo sprouts he has collected to make amends for taking the youngsters' food. Once Baketsu Shadow appears, attracted by the smell of the food, ToQ 1gou decides to punish him for making the people hungry by using the power of the Red, Green, and Yellow Ressha in sequence, before the ToQgers defeat him with the Renketsu Bazooka. When the ToQgers remember that their Ressha are trapped outside the station, the Conductor uses the CarCarrier Ressha to fix the tracks and cross the river, allowing the heroes to form ToQ-Oh and use their new Ressha as ToQ-Oh CarCarrier to finish Baketsu Shadow with the CarCarrier Dash. Once the station returns to normal, the ToQgers continue their travel along the Rainbow Line when the Conductor informs them that there are no other support Ressha in their current possession, but there are others who are missing thanks to the Shadow Line's interference. At that moment, Right remembers that he saw an object resembling a Ressha while he was looking for food and the others argue with him for not saying it beforehand, unaware that General Schwarz has been spying on them after he bugged the Ressha trains.
6	"What Are We Looking For?"; Transliteration: "Sagashimono wa Nan Desu ka" (Japanese: 探し物はなんですか)	Yasuko Kobayashi	March 23, 2014
Upon learning that Right had just seen one of the missing Support Ressha while out in the woods, the team returns to the forest to look for it, as he has forgotten its exact location. However, General Schwarz and his soldiers appear and reveal his intention to claim the lost Ressha for himself, and the ToQgers fight him, just to be easily defeated. Using Tokatti as a hostage, Schwarz coerces Right into leading him to the Ressha's location, while Hikari and the others who managed to flee decide that to save their captive friends, they must retrieve the Ressha first. They remember that when Right went to find some food, he had brought some bamboo sprouts with him, leading them to realize that the Ressha must be hidden inside a bamboo forest. While walking through the forest, Right remembers exactly where the Ressha is located and attempts to mislead General Schwarz with no success. When he decides to dispose of them, the other ToQgers flee, taking the newfound Tank Ressha with them. General Schwarz pursues them with his personal Cryner, and after disposing of the Clothes with their ToQ Blasters, ToQ 1gou and 2gou rush after them on the Red Ressha. Powered up by the Tank Ressha's energy supply, the Red Ressha overcomes General Schwarz's Cryner. He converts it into a Cryner Robo and the ToQgers form ToQ-Oh to fight it. By equipping the Tank Ressha to form ToQ-Oh Tank, the ToQgers defeat General Schwarz with the ToQ-Oh Tank's Tank Upper. The wounded General manages to survive the battle and return to the Castle Terminal where he is mocked one last time by Right via the bug he laid on the Ressha, before Right destroys it.
SP	"Ressha Sentai ToQger vs. Kamen Rider Gaim: Spring Break Combined Special"; Transliteration: "Ressha Sentai Tokkyūjā Tai Kamen Raidā Gaimu Haruyasumi Gattai Supesharu" (Japanese: 烈車戦隊トッキュウジャーＶＳ仮面ライダー鎧武 春休み合体スペシャル)	Nobuhiro Mouri	March 30, 2014
The Rainbow Line arrives at a station in Zawame City and with no Shadow Creeps in the area, the ToQgers decide to make a stop to enjoy the local attractions. While exploring the city, Right and the others watch a dance performance from Team Gaim when Moguraroid of the Badan Empire appears to cause a ruckus. Kouta Kazuraba appears to help his friend Mai and both Armored Rider Gaim and the ToQgers transform to fight the enemy. After being briefly surprised by each other's powers, the heroes confront Moguraroid who digs a hole in the ground to call for reinforcements, but opens a Crack instead from which a Lion Inves appears. Armored Rider Gaim and ToQ 1gou pursue the Inves through the Crack while the other ToQgers drive Moguraroid away, assisted by Mitsuzane Kureshima who transforms into Armored Rider Ryugen. On the other side of the Crack, Right is about to eat a fruit when Kouta stops him from doing so, warning him of the dangers of the Helheim Forest. Once reunited at Drupers, Kouta, Mitsuzane, Mai, and the ToQgers become friends and while Mai, Kagura, and Mio decide to hang out together, Right invites Kouta to show him the Ressha while Mitsuzane consults with his brother Takatora, head of the Yggdrasill Corporation about the Badan Empire. Despite Kouta having enough Imagination to see the Rainbow Line, he lacks a pass to enter it, until a mysterious man introducing himself as Narutaki appears along with a handpuppet version of himself, similar to Ticket, and lends Kouta one before leaving into a dimensional wall without further explanation. Once inside the Ressha, Right learns from Kouta about his fight to stop the Helheim Forest from spreading into Zawame City and offers his help, but Kouta refuses, claiming that the ToQgers are already busy with their search for their hometown while confronting the Shadow Line. Meanwhile, Mai, Mio, and Kagura have another encounter with Moguraroid who once again attempts to bring reinforcements, but draws out the Lion Inves instead, again, and both Gaim and the other ToQgers arrive to help them. During the fight, the Lion Inves eats some Helheim Fruits from a nearby Crack and enlarges itself into a gigantic size. The ToQgers then form ToQ-Oh CarCarrier Tank and manage to destroy the Inves. With the Rainbow Line about to depart from Zawame City, Kouta makes a request to Right, and using the Rainbow Pass he earned from Narutaki, he asks him to take Mai with them in order to keep her safe. Continued at the Kamen Rider Gaim episode list.
7	"Inconsolable, Unmotivatable"; Transliteration: "Yarusenaku, Yarukinaku" (Japanese: やるせなく、やる気なく)	Yasuko Kobayashi	April 6, 2014
To exploit the special properties of Kagura's Imagination, Right and the others decide to have her watch some ninja movies. However, she ends up getting too emotionally involved with it and accidentally breaks Hikari's kendama toy, much to his anger. The next day, the ToQgers arrive at Mukiryokuzaka Dark Station, where the Shadow Creep Hanko Shadow uses his Stamp Gloves to render all citizens devoid of all motivation. Instead of thinking on a plan, Right jumps head on to fight the monster, just to fall under his thrall. Mio and Tokatti are also struck as well, but the Creep retreats after his leg is injured during the fight. Back on the Ressha, Kagura looks to Hikari who is lost in his thoughts and wonders if he is still angry at her for breaking the toy. He realizes this and apologizes to her for being angry over such a simple thing, and for letting her think that he is still mad at her. Having come up with a way to fight Hanko Shadow, ToQ 4gou and 5gou confront the monster once more, and by having ToQ 5gou imagine herself as a solid and impenetrable rock, ToQ 4gou uses the Tunnel Axe to transform her into a huge kendama in order to attack the Shadow Creep while keeping a distance. The plan works, and after deceiving Hanko Shadow by briefly exchanging their Ressha, the two manage to destroy Hanko Shadow's Stamp Gloves and return all of his victims to normal, including the other ToQgers who join the battle and together, they defeat him with the Renketsu Bazooka. Once Hanko Shadow enlarges itself, the ToQgers form ToQ-Oh CarCarrier to defeat it, with Kagura finally putting her newfound ninja skills to use. Back on the Ressha, Kagura thanks Hikari for not being angry at her anymore and she realizes that he cares for his kendama because it must be a gift from someone important to him. However, the ToQgers rest is cut short when the Conductor announces that they have spotted another Support Ressha.
8	"Big Explosion on the Rainbow Line"; Transliteration: "Reinbō Rain Daibakuha" (Japanese: レインボーライン大爆破)	Yasuko Kobayashi	April 13, 2014
The signal from the lost Diesel Ressha is found, and the ToQgers split up in search for it after the Conductor explains that by being the oldest of the Ressha, it must be too weak to be restored for being separated from the Rainbow Line too long. While Right befriends a group of children, the others regroup to confront the Shadow Creep Bakudan Shadow until ToQ 1gou returns and defeats the enemy single handedly. Once returning to the Rainbow Line, Right reveals to the others that the children had given him a clue to the missing Ressha and returns to look for it, while the others are put in trouble when Bakudan Shadow reappears, planting a bomb on Tokatti and destroying the Ressha's brakes. The Shadow Creep then challenges the ToQgers to catch him and press the button on its head to deactivate the bomb before the Ressha derails and crashes into an oil refinery. Meanwhile, Right finds the Diesel Ressha but finding that it is too weak, cleans it up before attempting to activate it again. After attempting to catch Bakudan Shadow with no success, Hikari comes up with a plan to deceive it by having ToQ 2gou and 4gou exchange their Ressha to have it believe that Tokatti escaped the trap. It is a success and the others take advantage of the confusion to press the bomb and free him for real while Right, having successfully reactivated the Diesel Ressha, returns to assist the Conductor to control the main Ressha. After fixing the brakes and disposing of the Creep, the ToQgers form ToQ-Oh to confront and defeat the enlarged Bakudan Shadow assisted by the Diesel Ressha.
9	"Memory Is a One-Way Ticket"; Transliteration: "Omoi wa Katamichi Kippu" (Japanese: 思いは片道切符)	Yasuko Kobayashi	April 20, 2014
While the Ressha is under maintenance from the previous battle, the group uses the Support Ressha to continue their travels. Once stopping at Kitagojo Station for some rest and relaxation, the ToQgers are attacked by Marionette Shadow and during the fight Mio is protected by an unknown man that catches her attention. After driving the Shadow Creep away, the group returns to the Rainbow Line, but Mio cannot shake the man she met from her mind, particularly after learning that during the commotion, she found his wallet that he dropped. She contacts him, claiming that she wants a "rematch", as she prepares a lunch for an eventual encounter with him. Meanwhile, Marionette Shadow uses his mind control powers to put other men under his control, just like the man who helped Mio, and uses them to seduce other girls just to have them violently rejected in their next encounter, leaving them heartbroken and converting Kitagojo Station into Daisitsuren Dark Station. However, the plan backfires when it attempts to do the same with Mio, who confronts and defeats the monster using the Renketsu Bazooka with the other ToQgers help. With the main Ressha still unavailable, the ToQgers are informed that they can use the Support Ressha to form another robot, Diesel-Oh, to confront the enlarged monster and defeat it with the Diesel-Oh Spin Kick, returning to the main Ressha after its repairs are completed.
10	"Tokatti Dies at Sunset"; Transliteration: "Tokatchi, Yūyake ni Shisu" (Japanese: トカッチ、夕焼けに死す)	Yasuko Kobayashi	April 27, 2014
While jogging on his own to the next station to build up his endurance, Tokatti meets a boy named Hiroki Fujisawa playing baseball who says he cannot see the Ressha. Tokatti is astonished at this fact, but he is soon alerted by Right that the Shadow Line has just arrived at the next station. By the time Tokatti arrives, the ToQgers are confronting the Shadow Creep Type Shadow who has sent the Ressha off by typing about its departure. Type Shadow imprints Tokatti with the sentence "Tokatti dies at sunset" before taking his leave after ToQ 1gou damages his carriage. While the others pursue Type Shadow in hope that the Shadow Creep's death can save him, Tokatti assures Hiroki that he will be all right as he possesses Imagination, while learning the boy lost his ability to believe after failing to believe in himself. Tokatti eventually learns that the other ToQgers have found Type Shadow and makes his way to his team by the time the sun begins to set. Once transformed, ToQ 2gou switches colors with ToQ 1gou to confuse Type Shadow before he collapses. However, having trained himself before being called, ToQ 2gou is revealed to have used the fight to secretly type an additional line that he will be revived after he dies. The ToQgers then use the Calligraphy version of the Rainbow Rush to destroy Type Shadow. After learning that the Ressha is in space, they resolve to fight the enlarged Shadow Creep with Diesel-Oh to type out a new command to bring the Ressha back to Earth. From there, ToQ-Oh and Diesel-Oh together destroy Type Shadow with a combo attack. As the Ressha departs for its next station, Tokatti sees that Hiroki has regained his imagination as the boy waves good-bye to him.
11	"The Dark Emperor"; Transliteration: "Yami no Kōtei" (Japanese: 闇の皇帝)	Yasuko Kobayashi	May 4, 2014
At the Castle Terminal, confronted by Madame Noir over General Schwarz being sent to retrieve their leader, Barone Nero explains that the darkness he has acquired at the cost of his followers has allowed him to open railway to the Dark Emperor. But when General Schwarz returns to the terminal where Nero has assembled a welcoming ceremony, only the Emperor's bodyguard Lamp Shadow emerges with their leader revealed to have left the train midway to find some fun. Meanwhile, the ToQgers are excited to find they are to have a stop at the Yumenohoshi-yūenchimae Station, right in front of an amusement park. While the ToQgers enjoy their day at the amusement park, Right meets a strange young man with balloons who has an obsession for shiny things. But Right eventually realizes there is something wrong about the young man as he finds him odd. Before the young man can introduce himself, two Cryners arrive with the Shadow Line's leading figures surrounding him. After General Schwarz introduces Barone Nero and Madame Noir to them, the young man introduces himself as the Shadow Line's leader Zet, the Dark Emperor. The ToQgers transform to fight the Clothes that have accompanied him before General Schwarz, Madame Noir, and Barone Nero overpower them. But Emperor Zet stops his followers from killing the defeated ToQgers as he reveals he does want such light to be extinguished before realizing the five have been consumed in darkness. Before he can explain, Emperor Zet's body begins to fail from being in the light for too long as the Shadow Line falls back, save a fearful Glitta. The ToQgers pursue the Cryners on the Ressha, only to be halted by three Cryner Robos which ToQ-Oh and Diesel-Oh destroy with the Double Ressha Super Combination attack. But as the ToQgers are about to leave for the next station, Lamp Shadow acts on Emperor Zet's orders to test the ToQgers' light by using an ability that renders Tokatti, Mio, Hikari, and Kagura unable to see the Ressha and seemingly devoid of their Imagination.
12	"The Rainbow Commuter Pass"; Transliteration: "Niji no Teikiken" (Japanese: 虹の定期券)	Yasuko Kobayashi	May 11, 2014
As the Yumenohoshi-Yūenchimae Station transforms into the Yaminokage Dark Station, where people are devoid of Imagination, the Ressha is forced to depart while Right remains to search for his friends. Right soon runs into Lamp Shadow and learns that Emperor Zet is interested in the ToQgers and that the Shadow Creep has hypnotized Right's friends along with the town's residents as part of an experiment. But as Right finds it hard to get his friends back to normal, he begins to remember more of their childhood home when each mentions a pass they made for their club house. Emperor Zet then appears, summoning Lamp Shadow to fight ToQ 1gou. When Right realizes that his friends have never lost their passes, they break Lamp Shadow's hold over themselves. The ToQgers defeat several Clothes before overwhelming Lamp Shadow with a Fire Extinguishing Rainbow Rush. Elsewhere, Emperor Zet meets Glitta, who attempts to kill him out of fear of him, but he falls in love with her light-filled eyes. When Lamp Shadow is revived as a giant, Right combines the Ressha with the Diesel Ressha, Tank Ressha, and CarCarrier Ressha to form Cho ToQ-Oh, and with this new power they destroy the Shadow Creep. Departing from the restored Yumenohoshi-yūenchimae Station, Right and his friends hope they will regain their full memories before reaching their hometown.
13	"Run Fire Extinguisher"; Transliteration: "Hashire Shōkaki" (Japanese: 走れ消火器)	Akatsuki Yamatoya	May 18, 2014
The overuse of Cho ToQ-Oh during a series of attacks from Cryner Robos leaves the Ressha in dire need of repairs as it and the Support Ressha need to be reinforced to deal with the stress of the combination. The Conductor also explains that the faint signal of a Support Ressha has been detected at the station they have stopped by. While they search, Mio is bothered by Right's habit of putting food before their mission, prior to finding a Shadow Creep having Clothes paint the area black. After the Shadow Creep introduces himself as Loupe Shadow, the ToQgers fight the Clothes before Loupe Shadow runs off. As Right goes off on his own with Kagura following him, Mio is livid over Right's bad habit before she, Tokatti, and Hikari learn that Loupe Shadow's plan is to burn the city with his magnifying glass once it is all painted black. Mio calls Right to help find Loupe Shadow, but he tells her that he has confidence in her to get it done as he focuses on the giant fire extinguisher he and have Kagura found. Though the three ToQgers are too late to stop Loupe Shadow from setting the city on fire, Mio understands Right's trust from a past memory before she, ToQ 2gou, and ToQ 4gou fight Loupe Shadow. By that time, Right activates the Fire Ressha to put out the fires. After being defeated by the three ToQgers, Loupe Shadow enlarges as he sets the nearby forest on fire. The group forms Diesel-Oh and the ToQgers combine it with the Fire Ressha to form Diesel-Oh Fire to put out the fire before finishing Loupe Shadow with the Fire Splash. Later, Mio admits that she was wrong about Right until he arrives with snacks he brought from the city.
14	"Lost Cop, Great Detective"; Transliteration: "Meikeiji, Meitantei" (Japanese: 迷刑事、名探偵)	Akatsuki Yamatoya	May 25, 2014
While stopping at the Kiraridai Station for half a day, Hikari remains behind to read a book on a detective while Right, Tokatti, Mio, and Kagura find themselves arrested by an incompetent detective named Gonzaemon Toride for a series of crimes that occurred the day before. The Conductor, Ticket, and Wagon fret as Hikari decides to investigate the matter to find the real culprit of the crimes. Hikari's search leads him to the Shadow Creep Sōjiki Shadow who is stealing jewelry and shiny things for Madame Noir. Hikari heads to the Kiraridai Police Station to tell Detective Toride what he has learned, only for the detective to say his explanation is ridiculous, but he clears the ToQgers of all charges when Sōjiki Shadow commits a bank robbery while they are still in custody. Hikari sets up a stake out at a sushi bar soon after, on the hunch that Sōjiki Shadow would steal shiny sushi. Cornering Sōjiki Shadow at his hide out, ToQ 4gou trades colors with ToQ 1gou to weaken the Shadow Creep from the inside before the ToQgers finish him off with a Shiny Sushi Platter version of the Rainbow Rush. When ToQ 1gou finds a Support Ressha among Sōjiki Shadow's haul as the Shadow Creep enlarges, he summons the Police Ressha and combines it with ToQ-Oh to form ToQ-Oh Police to take out a Cryner and destroy Sōjiki Shadow with its Police Smash attack. After Hikari leaves Detective Toride a call to find Sōjiki Shadow's stash, the ToQgers eat some shiny sushi as the Ressha departs for its next destination.
15	"The Thing In Your Heart"; Transliteration: "Kokoro no Naka ni Aru Mono" (Japanese: 心の中にあるもの)	Shō Aikawa	June 1, 2014
Aboard the Ressha, the gang learns that Mio has the weakest Imagination amongst the ToQgers before they arrive at the Akumugaoka Dark Station where the Shadow Creep Hammer Shadow is extracting the deepest desires of people and smashing the objects so his victims would fall into their inner darkness. The ToQgers transform to fight his Clothes accompaniment with ToQ 3gou unable to fight properly due to thinking about her low Imagination. Hammer Shadow then uses his power on Mio to create a childish shumai-like creature named Mikey who overpowers the Shadow Creep. Mikey soon runs off and Mio follows after him. As Mio manages to keep Mikey out of trouble, Hikari explains that Mikey is actually an old toy of Mio's and a mental representation of Mio holding her Imagination back. Though Hikari attempts to hide Mio and Mikey, Hammer Shadow finds them. The ToQgers hold the Shadow Line forces back before Mikey sacrifices himself to save ToQ 3gou from Hammer Shadow's attack. But instead of generating darkness as he intended, Hammer Shadow only allows ToQ 3gou to use the full power of her Imagination to defeat the Shadow Creep. But General Schwarz saves Hammer Shadow and leaves the ToQgers to deal with Cryner Robos with ToQ-Oh Police and Diesel-Oh Fire. Soon after, Mio tells the ToQgers that she has regained her memories of Mikey and hopes that she will see her doll again when she returns home.
16	"The Dangerous Extraordinary Ressha"; Transliteration: "Kiken na Rinji Ressha" (Japanese: 危険な臨時烈車)	Shō Aikawa	June 8, 2014
Though Hammer Shadow thanks him for saving his life, General Schwarz hooks him up to his Cryner. Sometime later, the Ressha arrives at a Dark Station where the ToQgers find children willingly entering General Schwarz's Cryner before jumping into the train. Right, Mio, and Hikari enter the train, and become enthralled by its power, keeping them in a restaurant while the children play around in a kid's museum. Kagura and Tokatti are separated from the others by a girl named Aoi who believes that her little brother Kakeru has been kidnapped by the train's owner. It is at this time that they discover that it is a Shadow Line plot to have children unusually happy by giving them their deepest desire. Tokatti and Kagura are found by General Schwarz as he evicts them and Aoi from his train before beginning the next phase of his plan. Kagura and Tokatti pursue the Cryner in the Police Ressha, and Aoi uses her Imagination to help ToQ 5gou find the children who are about to their dreams smashed by Hammer Shadow, just as General Schwarz reveals his plans to her. ToQ 5gou is forced to fight him and Clothes on her own before she uses her Imagination to snap Right, Mio, and Hikari out of their trance. As the three freed ToQgers hold off General Schwarz, ToQ 5gou fights Hammer Shadow before the Police Ressha stops the Cryner in its tracks. The ToQgers get the children to safety before defeating Hammer Shadow with a One Million Paper Fan Smack variation of the Rainbow Rush and then destroy the Shadow Creep with Cho ToQ-Oh after disarming him. As General Schwarz falls back with the darkness he gathered, the Ressha heads off to its next location while the Conductor and Ticket receive a gift from their superiors: the Build Ressha and the AppliChanger.
17	"The Sky After the Rain"; Transliteration: "Ameagari no Sora ni" (Japanese: 雨上がりの空に)	Yasuko Kobayashi	June 22, 2014
The ToQgers form ToQ-Oh to deal with a Cryner Robo remote controlled by Emperor Zet, summoning Diesel-Oh to defeat their opponent. Soon after, the ToQgers learn from the Conductor and Ticket that they have obtained the Build Ressha and the AppliChanger in preparation for a sixth ToQger. Though the ToQgers believe their sixth member is a moody man walking in the rain towards them, the Conductor explains that he is a railway worker for the Rainbow Line who is a former Shadow Line member named Zaram, before he switched sides to atone for his misdeeds. While the others believe the Conductor's explanation, Right intends to have Zaram join them anyway. He leaves the Ressha to meet the railway worker before he is attacked by General Schwarz, who was an old friend of Zaram's. This forces Zaram to assume his true form to get Right to safety while General Schwarz goes after the other ToQgers on the notion that they know where Zaram is hiding. While tending to Right's wound, believing his power to project endless rain is evil, Zaram explains that he resolved to protect the light upon seeing a rainbow, and as atonement he would pay with his life. When Right is contacted by Wagon of his teammates being attacked, Right asks Zaram to fight with him as a ToQger. Given the AppliChanger by Right before facing General Schwarz, Zaram transforms into the sixth ToQger: ToQ 6gou. Believing he has found a place worth dying, his rain cloud dissipates during his transformation. ToQ 6gou battles General Schwarz with the duel ending with General Schwarz escaping while Zaram collapses. But despite believing he has died, Zaram is told he is still alive as he gives the AppliChanger back to Right before walking off.
18	"And What Do We Call You?"; Transliteration: "Kimi no Na o Yobeba" (Japanese: 君の名を呼べば)	Yasuko Kobayashi	June 29, 2014
At Castle Terminal, Emperor Zet confronts General Schwarz about Zaram with an interest in the former Shadow Line member. However, he reveals he knows he is acting behind his back, and warns General Schwarz to cease unauthorized activities. On the Ressha, though he has given back the AppliChanger and his powers have finally faded away, the topic of letting Zaram join the ToQgers is brought into question before they arrive at Henzutsū Dark Station where the Shadow Creep Ring Shadow is torturing people with his headbands. The ToQgers find Zaram with Ring Shadow and see him get a headband, but he is immune to Ring Shadow's ability as he has long since discarded his name. However, Emperor Zet arrives and revives Zaram's nature as a creature of darkness as he and Right are both subjected to Ring Shadow's power. Emperor Zet tells Zaram to meet him again to continue discussion with Right as incentive. Though Hikari refuses to trust him completely, Zaram promises to save Right and find a place where he can die. Back on the Ressha, the gang debates on what to do before Hikari gets an idea. Later, Zaram arrives to where Emperor Zet is waiting as he proceeds to torture Zaram to find how he has opened his heart to the light. After Right tricks Ring Shadow to remove the headband, the other ToQgers arrive as they use the Rainbow Rush to give Zaram a new name: Akira Nijino. Emperor Zet gets his answer upon seeing the rainbow, and, dejected by his inability to be accepted by the light, leaves Ring Shadow to deal with the ToQgers with Akira allowed to fight alongside them as ToQ 6gou. After being defeated by ToQ 6gou, Ring Shadow overpowers ToQ-Oh before ToQ 6gou summons the Drill Ressha which combines with ToQ-Oh to form ToQ-Oh Drill to destroy the Shadow Creep. With everything back to normal, save for his ideal, Akira turns down the ToQgers' offer to join them aboard the Ressha as he walks off to protect the Rainbow Line in his own way.
19	"Now Departing! Build DaiOh"; Transliteration: "Shuppatsu! Birudo Daiō" (Japanese: 出発！ビルドダイオー)	Yasuko Kobayashi	July 6, 2014
While working on the railway, Akira acquires a new Ressha from the Rainbow Line and proceeds to master driving it. Learning of Akira's sudden disappearance, the ToQgers attempt to find him. Tokatti finds him first as he tries to befriend Akira one-on-one. But as Tokatti sees that Akira has completely taken the new Ressha's cockpit apart to set in a pulley system, they learn the Ressha is under attack by a Cryner Robo under the control of Fence Shadow. Though the two attempt to help, the Cryner Robo forcefully equips the Drill Ressha and buries the Ressha. Akira and Tokatti are forced to escape, with the latter remembering that he was a transfer student the others befriended. Akira now understands his resolve to befriend him, while telling him that they can best help the others with the Build Ressha. After finishing the remodeling, ToQ 6gou uses the Build Ressha to free the Ressha and save its occupants from suffocation. After the ToQgers defeat Fence Shadow with a Rock Slide variation of the Rainbow Rush, the ToQgers enter the Build Ressha as it reconfigures into Build DaiOh. Reclaiming the Drill Ressha, Build DaiOh becomes Build DaiOh Drill and destroys Fence Shadow with its Shovel Drill Double Crash attack. Upon realizing he was forcing a friendship with Akira, Tokatti sees Akira's resolve to help him and his friends reach their hometown as the ToQgers go to the Ressha to enjoy some bento.
20	"Smiling Is Dangerous"; Transliteration: "Egao wa Kiken" (Japanese: 笑顔は危険)	Yasuko Kobayashi	July 13, 2014
On the Ressha, with Ticket utterly livid over what Akira has done to the Build Ressha, the topic of Akira never smiling comes up as they attempt to get him to laugh. But after Akira explains that he will smile once he has died, the ToQgers are alerted to the presence of Ōwarai Dark Station where those who laugh are sent flying through the power of the Shadow Creep Jack-in-the-Box Shadow. After fighting the Clothes, the main ToQgers are taken out by their laughter while ToQ 6gou drives Jack-in-the-Box Shadow off. On the Ressha, the main ToQgers undergo strange comedy training to give Jack-in-the-Box Shadow a taste of his own medicine. Though they think they are ready, the ToQgers' training is shown to be fruitless as Akira arrives, playing a recorder instead of his missing harmonica that makes all parties laugh. ToQ 6gou then proceeds to defeat the Clothes with the other ToQgers' assistance while an upset ToQ 1gou sits the fight out. After ToQ 6gou defeats Jack-in-the-Box Shadow, he summons the Build Ressha while the others form ToQ-Oh and Diesel-Oh. But as ToQ 6gou forms Build DaiOh, he begins to laugh uncontrollably throughout the fight until the Ressha combinations destroy Jack-in-the-Box Shadow and his Cryner support. It is at this time that they discover that Akira is being tickled by a kitten he borrowed from a little girl who was unable to keep it, which the main ToQgers notice has made him smile. When Akira is forced to give the cat back to the little girl, regaining his harmonica in the process, he sobs over the loss before reverting to his usual moody self. Meanwhile, at Castle Terminal, Madame Noir has made the finishing touches on Miss Glitta's wedding dress, with Barone Nero feeling that Noir has an ulterior motive through her daughter.
21	"The Runaway Bride"; Transliteration: "Hanayome wa Tōsōchū" (Japanese: 花嫁は逃走中)	Yasuko Kobayashi	July 20, 2014
At Castle Terminal, Miss Glitta admits to Madame Noir that she does not want to marry Emperor Zet before her mother tells her the true purpose of the wedding. More terrified as a result, Miss Glitta confides in General Schwarz that they must flee together while Barone Nero's suspicions of a farce wedding are confirmed. On the Ressha, the ToQgers get ready for summer but Mio is suddenly struck by glimpses of a sad memory of a summer festival. A Cryner passes by with an invitation to Emperor Zet's wedding, which the ToQgers investigate. However, it turns out to be a trap set by Miss Glitta to have her Shadow Creep Sabão Shadow use his ability to switch minds with Mio, while Right, Tokatti, and Hikari also fall under the Shadow Creep's spell. From there, Miss Glitta escapes in Mio's body while Madame Noir arrives to bring back who she believes is her daughter to Castle Terminal. Luckily, ToQ 6gou's interference allows Kagura to get Mio-Glitta to safety before they find Miss Glitta and learn her reasons for wanting to escape. However, as she and Mio begin to weaken, Miss Glitta realizes she was unaware of the fatal side effect of Sabão Shadow's power. Madame Noir learns the truth of the situation and makes a temporary truce with the ToQgers while holding off Barone Nero. Luckily, the male ToQgers manage to defeat Sabão Shadow to undo his spell, allowing Miss Glitta to run off. After Mio promises to tell Kagura what is worrying her later, they join the other ToQgers in the Police Ressha and Fire Ressha that Diesel-Oh equips so it and Build DaiOh can destroy Sabão Shadow. After sunset, Miss Glitta arrives to the place she and General Schwarz planned to elope, only for her beloved to have revealed the location to Emperor Zet so he can retrieve his bride-to-be.
22	"Birth of the Empress"; Transliteration: "Jotei no Tanjō" (Japanese: 女帝の誕生)	Yasuko Kobayashi	July 27, 2014
After being found by Emperor Zet, Miss Glitta is forced to return to Castle Terminal out of fear for General Schwarz's well-being. As the final preparations for the wedding are underway, Barone Nero attempts to warn Emperor Zet of Madame Noir's treachery before being knocked back by the Emperor's power for his attempt on Miss Glitta's life. Soon after, General Schwarz reveals he has abandoned Miss Glitta for his own ambition, and the wedding ceremony commences. Madame Noir makes her move and has Miss Glitta devour Emperor Zet to take his power for her own. With Emperor Zet gone, General Schwarz can now attack the Rainbow Line without restraint. On the Ressha, Mio reveals she has recovered an important memory of their hometown that they were going somewhere during a summer festival. This causes Right to remember that they were going to their secret base to see the stars. They now know that they might find their hometown by finding seaside places with star-gazing festivals. During the search, Mio admits that her recovered memory was not all happy before the ToQgers are alerted to General Schwarz's appearance. Joined by Akira, the six ToQgers fight the Shadow Line forces while the Clothes hijack the Ressha and Miss Glitta appears in her new Empress of Darkness state. After Empress Glitta tells him to stop playing around, General Schwarz pilots ToQ-Oh to battle Diesel-Oh and Build DaiOh. Things become worse when Empress Glitta joins the fray in the Imperial Cryner Robo, overpowering the Ressha combinations while the main ToQgers begin to remember the night of the festival ended with their town swallowed by darkness.
23	"United Hand in Hand"; Transliteration: "Te to Te o Tsunai de" (Japanese: 手と手をつないで)	Yasuko Kobayashi	August 10, 2014
The ToQgers barely escape the Imperial Cryner Robo's Darkness Fall attack, but the Support Ressha are damaged. As Akira proceeds to make repairs, the main ToQgers are attracted to the Sakuma Shrine festival where the memories of their hometown's festival come back to them along with their families. The main ToQgers are then alerted to General Schwarz's appearance and resolve to keep him from attacking the festival. With ToQ 1gou holding back General Schwarz, the other ToQgers manage to reclaim the Ressha. Refusing to give up, General Schwarz summons his personal Cryner as Cho ToQ-Oh and Build DaiOh are forced to fight him. At that time, upon seeing General Schwarz's handkerchief, Miss Glitta regains a bit of her former self and runs off to aid him in the Imperial Cryner. While once more subjected to the Darkness Fall, the main ToQgers remember how they were brave at the end of their hometown along with recovering the name of their home: Subarugahama. This mindset allows the ToQgers to have Cho ToQ-Oh combine with the Build Ressha to form Cho Cho ToQ-DaiOh. Miss Glitta uses the Imperial Cryner Robo to shield General Schwarz's Cryner from the Cho Cho ToQ-DaiOh Imagination Express attack. Both Cryners are destroyed, and Miss Glitta ends up mortally wounded and back to her usual self. Upon seeing Miss Glitta has forgiven him, General Schwarz is about to return her feelings when she is consumed from the inside by a monstrous being revealed to be Emperor Zet. He reveals he has acquired Miss Glitta's inner light, and in his new form Emperor Zet sends General Schwarz falling into the river while revealing he intends to obtain the main ToQgers' light, the first light he saw, when they meet next time.
24	"Pass the Junction"; Transliteration: "Bunkiten o Koete" (Japanese: 分岐点を越えて)	Yasuko Kobayashi	August 17, 2014
Right and the others search the records for their hometown of Subarugahama, ignoring the pleas of Wagon, only to come up empty as if the town never existed. Ticket reveals that this is the result of being completely enveloped by the Shadow Line's darkness; the town around a Dark Station separated from the Rainbow Line and made a part of the Shadow Line as a Shadow Town. However, Akira reveals that there is a way onto the Shadow Line as he takes them to a junction line linking the Rainbow Line and Shadow Line railways and loans them his Drill Ressha, as it was previously a Cryner. The group arrives in the Shadow Town of Ugokenai, where they encounter Ugokenai's Keeper Rook. They prepare to fight him, but they find that they are unable to maintain their transformation for more than 30 seconds at a time, forcing them into hiding. Eventually, the group comes up with a plan to let one of them deal with Keeper Rook while the others hold off the Clothes, before only Right is left to face the Keeper while using Transfer Changes to prolong his transformation and a Shogi variation of the Rainbow Rush to finish Keeper Rook off. Outside the Shadow Line, Akira is confronted by Barone Nero until Ugokenai and an enlarged Rook manifest back into normal space. Keeper Rook then proceeds to absorb Clothes from his spear to increase his size to overpower Cho ToQ-Oh and Build DaiOh before they combine into Cho Cho ToQ-DaiOh to destroy Keeper Rook's spear and then Keeper Rook himself. With the town restored, the main ToQgers decide to save the towns taken by the Shadow Line as Akira leaves to find the next junction point.
25	"Right Out of a Fairy Tale"; Transliteration: "Otogibanashi ga Tobidashite" (Japanese: おとぎ話が飛び出して)	Yasuko Kobayashi	August 24, 2014
After overexerting himself while training with Right and Hikari for the next Shadow Town, Tokatti falls asleep on the couch while Mio treats his wounds before the ToQgers arrive to the Otogi Dark Station where they encounter fairy tale characters brought to life by Pinspo Shadow as part of Emperor Zet's scheme to acquire the light from the fictional characters. However, Emperor Zet is disappointed by the fairy tale characters' lack of light as Barone Nero offers to take over and orders Pinspo Shadow to destroy them in hopes it would stir up inner darkness. While ToQ 6gou holds off Barone Nero and Pinspo Shadow, the other ToQgers spirit the fairy tale characters away. ToQ 2gou remains behind before he is saved by a figure he recognizes as Ryo Knight; Tokatti explains to Mio and Kagura that Ryo Knight is a super hero he made up as a child. The Shadow Line forces eventually find them as the ToQgers and Ryo Knight fight them side by side. But with Ryo Knight's encouragement, ToQ 2gou decides to use the training he and the others did to drive Barone Nero back before the ToQgers use a Fairy Tale Collection variation of the Rainbow Rush to finish Pinspo Shadow off. When Pinspo Shadow is revived, ToQ-Oh and Build DaiOh are formed to fight the enlarged Shadow Creep. Build DaiOh equips the Tank Ressha to become Build DaiOh Tank while ToQ-Oh equips the Build Ressha to become ToQ-Oh Build to finish their opponent off. Later, Tokatti explains to Mio that Ryo Knight is modeled after his older brother and the two have moment before their friends start the fireworks celebration. Elsewhere, as Madame Noir learns that Miss Glitta is still alive within Emperor Zet, General Schwarz is revealed to have survived his fall into the river as he finds his Cryner still intact.
26	"The Fight that Started in a Bathhouse"; Transliteration: "Sentō de Sentō Kaishi" (Japanese: 銭湯で戦闘開始)	Akatsuki Yamatoya	August 31, 2014
At their next stop in the town of Tsukikawa, the ToQgers are ambushed by a group of Clothes the moment they step out of the Ressha, but are perplexed that they cannot find a Shadow Creep once they manage to subdue the Clothes. While the other ToQgers are searching for a dark presence, Kagura gets herself lost and follows Akira to the Hironoyu Sentō bathhouse where the owner is dealing with the loan shark Teruo Inzai, who is threatening to tear the establishment down if he is not paid by the following day. Joined by the other ToQgers, Akira and Kagura are allowed to have a bath in the establishment which inspires the group to help out. The ToQgers try their best to advertise the bathhouse, but Akira decides to add a discount to their advertisement, which dismays the group. However, the next day, just as Inzai is to repo the bathhouse, it is revealed that Kagura and Akira have used the Build Ressha to lift the whole building off of its foundation, revealing a mass of darkness beneath it. Inzai is forced to reveal himself as the Shadow Creep Coin Shadow, and explains his intention to force the Hironoyu Sentō out of business to build a new Shadow Line Terminal in its place. The ToQgers transform and fight Coin Shadow before ToQ 5gou and ToQ 6gou knock the Shadow Creep into the mass of darkness. Coin Shadow enlarges from absorbing the darkness, leading the ToQgers to use ToQ-Oh and Diesel-Oh to battle, before combining to form Cho ToQ-Oh Fire to destroy Coin Shadow as he gets dizzy from the darkness. After putting the bathhouse back in place, the owner grants Kagura and Akira's request for one last bath before they resume their journey.
27	"A New Power"; Transliteration: "Arata na Chikara o" (Japanese: 新たな力を)	Yasuko Kobayashi	September 7, 2014
The group finds Right acting intense for some reason just as Akira calls them to say that he has found a junction to a Shadow Town. The Conductor and Ticket then present the group with the Hyper Ressha, which requires a large amount of Imagination and thus is entrusted to Right. Upon arriving in the Shadow Town of Samayoi, the ToQgers are ambushed by Keeper Bishop. However, ToQ 1gou is unable to use the Hyper Ressha as Right has come down with a fever. ToQ 4gou is unable to hold off Keeper Bishop, ToQ 6gou arrives to cover the ToQgers' escape before the group ends up being separated by the spell cast on Samayoi. With Right feeling he should have been able to use the Hyper Ressha, Akira tells him to stay put as he uses his harmonica to guide the others to him so they can distract Keeper Bishop. The other ToQgers find Akira after assuming his Zaram form before they are confronted by Emperor Zet and the head of the Keepers, Marchioness Mork, who wants Emperor Zet to see his weakness in seeking out light as she orders Keeper Bishop not to hold back on their account. Luckily, after realizing that true Imagination is to be free and have fun, Right arrives and uses the Hyper Ressha to become Hyper ToQ 1gou to overpower Keeper Bishop. Emperor Zet then joins the fray, his darkness clashing with Right's light, before the two engage in physical combat. However, Hyper ToQ 1gou obtains the Daikaiten Cannon and fires the Hyper Last Train Crash at Emperor Zet, but Keeper Bishop takes the deathblow. As Marchioness Mork takes Emperor Zet away, Keeper Bishop enlarges with ToQ-Oh and Build DaiOh formed to fight him. They soon form Cho Cho ToQ-DaiOh to destroy their opponent. As the town returns to normal, the other ToQgers end up getting sick, forcing Right to take care of them.
28	"Uncool but Cool"; Transliteration: "Kakko Warui ga Kakko Ii" (Japanese: カッコ悪いがカッコ良い)	Yasuko Kobayashi	September 14, 2014
Marchioness Mork has decided to move into Castle Terminal as she orders Madame Noir to gather darkness. Forced to comply, Madame Noir uses her power to drive people into a rampage before Akira finds her. While the main ToQgers remove Madame Noir's feathers from the rampagers' heads, she sends a feather barrage ToQ 6gou's way. He accidentally sends one of her feathers onto ToQ 1gou's head, leaving his teammates unable to fight their friend. Luckily, ToQ 6gou is able to fight without restraint before the other main ToQgers grab him and escape. Tokatti and Hikari work together as they search for Right, when Tokatti's feelings for Mio are brought up. Before Tokatti can explain himself, they are alerted that Right is at the park, just as Hikari admits that both Tokatti and Mio are annoying. Once regrouped, the ToQgers use memories of Right wronging them to knock him out to get the feather off of his head. Hyper ToQ 1gou then overpowers Noir as she escapes on a Cryner with Build DaiOh dealing with two Cryner Robos covering her. However, Hyper ToQ 1gou allows his team to join him to firing the Hyper 5 Connection Crash attack to destroy the enemy robots. As the gang enjoys Mio's homemade pudding, with Tokatti asking Hikari to keep his feelings for Mio a secret, General Schwarz has finished making the repairs on his Cryner.
29	"The Meeting with the Oncoming Train"; Transliteration: "Taikōsha to no Gōryūten" (Japanese: 対向車との合流点)	Akatsuki Yamatoya	September 21, 2014
Having survived Emperor Zet's attack and repaired his Cryner, General Schwarz sees he needs the Drill Ressha to enact his revenge. General Schwarz finds ToQ 6gou as he is attacked by Barone Nero's top subordinate Bottle Shadow, fighting the Shadow Creep before the other ToQgers' arrival forces Bottle Shadow off. Talking to Akira in private, General Schwarz express his need to defeat Emperor Zet by any means necessary as he requests an alliance with the ToQgers. Though the others think it is unwise to befriend him, Right decides to see General Schwarz's resolve and accepts after the others see it to avenge Miss Glitta. Soon after, when Bottle Shadow returns, the ToQgers enact General Schwarz's strategy before the Shadow Creep reveals an additional attack that disarms ToQ 6gou. Having known this fact, General Schwarz reveals his true colors as he takes the Drill Ressha as ToQ 1gou furiously fights him. After the item is knocked way from ToQ 1gou, ToQ 4gou uses the Hyper Ressha to become Hyper ToQ 4gou as he and use the other ToQgers Hyper 4 Connection Crash to destroy Bottle Shadow. General Schwarz then summons his Cryner and forms Cryner Drill to fight Diesel-Oh before escaping while ToQ-Oh destroys the enlarged Bottle Shadow. Later at the Ressha, Right apologizes as he lost their only means to enter Shadow Towns before Akira assures him and the others that they will get it back.
30	"The Birthday Celebration"; Transliteration: "Tanjōbi no Oiwai wa" (Japanese: 誕生日のお祝いは)	Akatsuki Yamatoya	September 28, 2014
After waking up from a dream, Kagura regains a memory that September 28 is Mio's birthday and she tells the others that she wants to throw Mio a surprise party. Kagura proceeds to bake a cake, but the others find it tastes plain. She decides to go to the Kazu Bakery to learn how to properly bake a cake, and convinces the head baker Airi to train her. Elsewhere, the male members cover for Kagura's absence, but must now deal with the Shadow Creep Wig Shadow before he places his Bird Nest Wigs that will kill them if they are unable to care for the chicks on their heads. Though Kagura is worried for them, Hikari and Tokatti convince her to focus on her baking lesson. After finishing her cake while Airi tells her what is truly important about baking a cake, Kagura runs into Wig Shadow but the cake ruined by the Shadow Creep's attack. The other ToQgers arrive yet are unable to fight, forcing ToQ 5gou to fight Wig Shadow on her own before the Shadow Creep gains the upper hand. Things seem hopeless until the ToQgers' shadow chicks grow up into shadow chickens that attack Wig Shadow before running off. Though Wig Shadow attempts to sneak off, ToQ 5gou refuses to let him escape as she uses the Hyper Ressha to change into Hyper ToQ 5gou, but ToQ 3gou is caught in the transformation and two are joined by the Hyper Ressha armor. ToQ 5gou explains that appearances are not everything as the female Hyper ToQgers double team Wig Shadow before defeating him with the Hyper 5 Connection Crash and then use Cho Cho ToQ-DaiOh to destroy him. Later, Mio's surprise birthday commences without a hitch.
31	"The Hyper Ressha Terminal"; Transliteration: "Haipā Ressha Tāminaru" (Japanese: ハイパーレッシャターミナル)	Yasuko Kobayashi	October 5, 2014
Instead of going to Uragoeshi Station, the ToQgers are informed that the Ressha will have a rare visit to the Hyper Ressha Terminal for a cleaning of lingering darkness. As Wagon and the ToQgers decide to look around the terminal to wait out he cleaning, the Conductor and Ticket meet with the Rainbow Line President over what they learn to be the President's concern about the ToQgers themselves. Elsewhere, Marchioness Mork learns of the Hyper Ressha Terminal's appearance and she orders Barone Nero to provide a distraction while she and Emperor Zet take the opportunity to take over the terminal. However, as the ToQgers arrive at the corrupted Uragaeshi Dark Station via bus to fight Nero and the Dining Set Brothers, the Imperial Cryner is attacked by General Schwarz, with a fight between himself and Marchioness Mork resulting in Madame Noir joining the feud to bide her time. Seeing the smoke caused from the fight, Right reaches the Shadow Line members' fight and saves a girl who was almost hit by Emperor Zet's attack. Right then sees no more reason to hold back against Emperor Zet. Their duel rages on into an all-out brawl until Emperor Zet suddenly kneels over. Marchioness Mork spirits him away and General Schwarz learns that Miss Glitta is still alive within the Emperor's body. Meanwhile, as ToQ 6gou battles Barone Nero, the other ToQgers manage to catch the Dining Set Brothers off guard, with Table Shadow sacrificing Chair Shadow to avoid the deathblow. With Hyper ToQ 1gou joining them, the ToQgers learn the Ressha cleaning is complete as they form Cho ToQ-Oh to eliminate Chair Shadow before destroying him. But despite Right having his friends promise to stop the Shadow Line, the Conductor and Ticket tell them that the ToQgers have been disbanded.
32	"Determination"; Transliteration: "Ketsui" (Japanese: 決意)	Yasuko Kobayashi	October 12, 2014
After the President of the Rainbow Line disbands the ToQgers, Right feels he is wrong and decides to talk to him directly for answers. But on the way, the ToQgers see themselves as children in their reflections. Going back to the Ressha in confusion, the ToQgers learn that they are still children whose Imagination had saved them from the darkness consuming Subarugahama. Furthermore, with the President using their Imagination to give them adult ages to fight the Shadow Line, the disbandment is revealed to be for their own good as the darkness would eventually make them adults forever. While ToQ 6gou holds off the remaining Dining Set Brothers as they make their way towards the Hyper Ressha Terminal, Right resolves to continue fighting even if it means no being able to return to his original age. Eventually, the other ToQgers follow suit and save ToQ 1gou and ToQ 6gou. The six ToQgers overwhelm the Dining Set Brothers before using a Hyper 5 Connection Crash and Yudou Breaker combination attack to defeat the Shadow Creeps with Cho ToQ-Oh Police Fire and Build DaiOh formed to fight them. But when the Dining Set Brothers gain the upper hand, the President gives the ToQgers permission to use the Hyper Ressha with Hyper ToQ 1gou transforming it into Hyper Ressha TeiOh to take out Table Shadow after Chair Shadow is destroyed. While the Conductor and the others deliberate the President's reasons and the path their friends have chosen, the ToQgers finally remember their full names and sing "Twinkle Twinkle Little Star" while looking at the night sky, just as they did when they were children. At Castle Terminal, still weakened from his previous attempt to reach the Hyper Terminal Terminal, Emperor Zet sings the same song as well.
33	"Karate Hot Match"; Transliteration: "Karate Ōichiban" (Japanese: カラテ大一番)	Yasuko Kobayashi	October 19, 2014
With their memories back, Conductor and Ticket noting their maturity, the ToQgers train with Right and Hikari after both remember that Right's grandfather taught the two of them karate. Before Right and Hikari can spar, they and the other ToQgers are alerted that a neighboring station has been taken by the Shadow Line. The ToQgers arrive to the Chūdoku Dark Station where they are attacked by martial artists, until their dojo leader stops them upon seeing Right and Hikari's skills. The dojo master explains that the Shadow Creep Chūshaki Shadow has placed poison injecting bracelets on everyone and that they have until sunset to defeat him by going through a gauntlet of battles in a building. Before the ToQgers enter the building, Chūshaki Shadow forces them to play by his rules by fighting without their powers while wearing Bracelet Syringes, as well. The ToQgers regroup back the Ressha, and Hikari forms a plan involving him and Right as a diversion while the others are on standby in the Dash Cars. Once back at the building, telling Right of how he lost their sparing match in the past and actually had their sensei's support, Hikari tells him to consider their act a game before they and the dojo master go through the gauntlet. Once Right and Hikari reach the top, the other ToQgers make their move before the "Chūshaki Shadow" they have been fighting is revealed to be a decoy. However, feigning a fight between himself and Right as the sun begins to set, Hikari reveals that the dojo master is actually Chūshaki Shadow, who assumed the dojo master's form after kidnapping him. Hikari and Right strike the Shadow Creep's syringe, ending his control over the town. The ToQgers then transform, with Hyper ToQ 1gou knocking Chūshaki Shadow out of the top floor window before following him to the ground floor, destroying the Shadow Creep during their descent. When the revived Chūshaki Shadow enlarges and renders Cho Cho ToQ-DaiOh powerless, Hyper ToQ 1gou uses Hyper Ressha TeiOh to destroy the Shadow Creep. Soon after the Ressha leaves, Hikari reveals that he used the gauntlet to test which of them is the better fighter by having defeated more Clothes, leaving Right to mope over his loss.
34	"Love Furor"; Transliteration: "Koi wa Ōsawagi" (Japanese: 恋は大騒ぎ)	Akatsuki Yamatoya	October 26, 2014
On the Ressha, the topic of an ideal boyfriend is brought up, much to Mio's dismay, but the group's good moods are soured when the Ressha has to head back to the previous Tsukiai Station as it has just been taken over by the Shadow Creep Billiard Shadow. Though she and the team drive Billiard Shadow off, Mio finds herself being pursued by a nerdy romantic named Yoshio Omotesando whom she saved from the Shadow Creep. To avoid Yoshio's affections, Mio lies that Akira is her boyfriend. After Mio attempts to get the Conductor to leave the station and be away from her stalker, Wagon suggests for her and Akira to go on a date, with Hikari telling Right that they should let Tokatti oversee the matter. As ToQ 1gou and ToQ 4gou hold off Billiard Shadow, Mio's date goes horribly due to her nervousness as Wagon has Akira use a last resort she gave him: a wedding ring. This causes Tokatti to overreact as Yoshio insists Mio and Akira to kiss to prove to him that they are in love. Though Akira agrees, he misunderstands Yoshio's words and kisses him instead. Just as everyone is shocked by the turn of events, ToQ 1gou and 4gou are knocked into the group from their fight against Billiard Shadow. Though ToQ 3gou and 6gou lead the attack against Billiard Shadow, but ToQ 2gou ends up facing the Shadow Creep on his own as Hyper ToQ 2gou to take out his frustrations before destroying the Shadow Creep with Hyper Ressha TeiOh. Although the ToQgers have succeeded in their task of saving Tsukiai Station, Akira ends up being stalked by Yoshio before the Ressha leaves for the next station.
35	"The Stolen Terminal"; Transliteration: "Ubawareta Tāminaru" (Japanese: 奪われたターミナル)	Yasuko Kobayashi	November 9, 2014
Finding Emperor Zet in a foul mood over his inability to truly take Miss Glitta's light for his own, Marchioness Mork takes advantage of their leader's growing darkness to stage a forced occupation of the Hyper Ressha. After the Cryners succeed in hijacking the terminal, the President contacts the Ressha and Build Ressha for assistance. However the ToQgers are unable to break through the barrier and are forced to fall back. Soon after, the President arrives on the Ressha to authorize the ToQgers to use all thirteen of their Ressha together to regain the Hyper Ressha. However, Hikari points out the Drill Ressha is still unaccounted for as he and the team mounts a rescue mission on foot. But the ToQgers find themselves facing Marchioness Mork, Madame Noir, and Barone Nero before Emperor Zet arrives to overwhelm them. At the same time, Akira finds General Schwarz and fights him to regain the Drill Ressha. But when contacted by the Conductor and Ticket that the ToQgers are losing, Akira is forced to accept surrender to Schwarz and instead makes a deal with him to regain the Drill Ressha. Back at the Hyper Terminal, Emperor Zet attempts to absorb Right. However, Miss Glitta stops Emperor Zet from carrying out the task. Marchioness Mork has a Cryner take Emperor Zet to safety before she and the other Shadow Line officers go in for the kill. Luckily, the Ressha arrives to retrieve the ToQgers as ToQ 6gou arrives. With all 13 Ressha cars, the ToQgers combine them with the Hyper Ressha to transform it into ToQ Rainbow. Marchioness Mork responds by having her Cryner combine with the other Cryners piloted by Noir and Nero into a Cho-Cryner Robo before it and the other Cryner Robos are destroyed by ToQ Rainbow. Later, as the main ToQgers are troubled by the turn of events involving Miss Glitta and the threat Emperor Zet poses to them now, Akira plays his harmonica with the knowledge that he will eventually have to honor his part in the pact he made with General Schwarz.
36	"A+ Dream"; Transliteration: "Yume wa Hyakuten" (Japanese: 夢は100点)	Shō Aikawa	November 16, 2014
On the Ressha, noting his stranger behavior since regaining the Drill Ressha, the ToQgers learn that Akira is searching for Shadow Towns on his own before the train stops at Hakutendaigakumae Station. The station's name rings a bell as Hikari runs out of the Ressha, the others following in suit, and he tells them that their substitute homeroom teacher Sakura Igawa attends Hakuten University. This inspires the ToQgers to find Sakura in the hope that they will be able to get clues to Subarugahama's whereabouts. Their search gets complicated when Hikari thinks he has found a girl resembling their teacher, but she feels she has no purpose in her life anymore since the Shadow Creep Mannenhitsu Shadow has been trying to make her flunk out as she has no hopes or dreams. Hikari saves Sakura while the other ToQgers deal with Mannenhitsu Shadow, until he retreats upon running out of ink. Later, still confused as to why Sakura is not the teacher they remembered, the ToQgers realize that the creation of a Shadow Town also erases the memories and experiences of those who visited the town. By then, the Conductor alerts the ToQgers that Mannenhitsu Shadow has resumed his attack after absorbing a Clothes to restore his ink. While the other ToQgers go after Mannenhitsu Shadow, Hikari reminds Sakura of her dream to become a teacher before running off to join the others, just as Sakura's memories start to be partially restored. ToQ 4gou arrives at the fight just as he finds his teammates have been re-numbered into failing grades of ToQ -100gou and multiple ToQ 0gous. ToQ 4gou transforms into Hyper ToQ 4gou to personally use the Hyper 5 Connection Crash to restore his team to normal. After Mannenhitsu Shadow enlarges, ToQ 6gou arrives in Build Dai-Oh to fight the Shadow Creep before he enlarges himself further. The ToQgers counter by forming ToQ Rainbow to destroy Mannenhitsu Shadow. The next day, after finally remembering her dream, Sakura attends class as the ToQgers watch on.
37	"Unreasonable Quiz"; Transliteration: "Rifujin Kuizu" (Japanese: 理不尽クイズ)	Akatsuki Yamatoya	November 23, 2014
On the Ressha, the ToQgers help themselves to snacks when Tokatti's indecisiveness is brought into light to his dismay. The ToQgers are then called by Akira after he has found a Shadow Town. They hope it is Subarugahama, but find it strange that Akira is accompanying them. The ToQgers arrive to the Shadow Town Achikochi-machi, with Akira eager to leave to find Subarugahama while muttering that he is running out of time. Before the ToQgers can inquire about his strange behavior, they are attacked by Keeper Knight who uses the power of his weapon steed Just A Way to keep ToQ 1gou and ToQ 4gou from attempting to extend their transformation time limits. Wanting to help the others, Tokatti is unable to decide what course of action to take before he and are Akira blasted off the edge of a cliff with the other ToQgers forced to retreat. After Tokatti comes to and tells Akira of his plight, Akira remembers his deal with General Schwarz: to ally himself with the renegade Shadow Line member and consider the ToQgers his enemies when the time comes. Though he wants to liberate Subarugahama before he is summoned to General Schwarz's side, Akira decides to help in that they must be able to make a difficult choice in the future. Tokatti and Akira then arrive in Achikochi-machi, finding themselves subjected to the Shadow Town's question control method before they are found by Keeper Knight. Akira holds off Keeper Knight in his Zaram form to allow Tokatti to escape, but he decides to fight for his friend as he has come to the conclusion that he will fight without making choices. By that time, the other ToQgers arrive after having gotten through the quizzes' deathtraps. All five main ToQgers transform to hinder Keeper Knight before Zaram grabs Just A Way and throws it out of the atmosphere so Hyper ToQ 2gou can finish the Keeper off. The ToQgers then form Cho Cho ToQ-DaiOh and Hyper Ressha TeiOh to fight the revived Keeper Knight, ultimately destroying him. Soon after, Akira leaves for the next Shadow Town with Tokatti remembering the promise he made to him.
38	"Let's Make a Movie"; Transliteration: "Eiga Tsukurō" (Japanese: 映画つくろう)	Akatsuki Yamatoya	November 30, 2014
The ToQgers discuss their favorite movies before they arrive to the station at Touto Film Studio. While the ToQgers expect to see celebrities, they instead find themselves facing the Shadow Creep Film Shadow when he is chasing a movie producer. Though he overpowers the ToQgers, Film Shadow leaves after advising ToQ 1gou not to use the Hyper Ressha until they reach the climax of their second fight scene. After the producer introduces himself as Waraziro Bubaigawara, he gives the ToQgers a tour of the studio before finding the director and staff missing from the set of his movie Police Reporter Pestacore. Kagura offers herself as director, changing the genre and apparently driving off the actors with Akira called to play the film lead alongside Tokatti. Elsewhere, with Film Shadow still on his mind, Hikari investigates on his own and learns that the cast and the staff are actually being held hostage in Screening Room 3 by Film Shadow. Film Shadow appears on screen while revealing that he has been harvesting the nightmares of the abducted staff and actors to create his masterpiece Yamitto Monster Z for the purpose of spreading darkness in every movie theater in Japan and beyond. But Kagura refuses to accept Film Shadow's movie as a genuine article as Right calls the Shadow Creep out of the movie screen to settle matters. As the fight commences, ToQ 5gou faces Film Shadow on her own before her teammates obtain the film reel and destroy it. Though Film Shadow expected ToQ 1gou to use the Hyper Ressha, he is instead defeated by a Security Guard variation of the Rainbow Rush and then destroyed by ToQ Rainbow after attempting to subject the ToQgers to a horror movie-themed illusion. Later, the ToQgers learn that Bubaigawara finished his movie using the footage of Kagura's directing and their fight with Film Shadow to create a box office success.
39	"The Beginning of the End"; Transliteration: "Owari no Hajimari" (Japanese: 終わりの始まり)	Yasuko Kobayashi	December 7, 2014
With Christmas approaching, the Shadow Line becomes less active due to the increasing amount of Imagination everywhere, giving the ToQgers a chance to rest and celebrate the holiday. But the Darkness Decline is what General Schwarz is waiting as he tells Akira that the time to fulfill his part of the bargain has come while Madam Noir makes her own move with Emperor Zet at his weakest due to Glitta's presence. Unable to reach Akira to invite him to join in the Christmas celebration, Right and the others pay a visit to the Build Ressha and find a note from Akira along with Drill Ressha for they own use. Going back to the Ressha, Tokatti reveals his time with Akira at Achikochi-machi before Hikari mentions how odd their friend regained the Drill Ressha from an opponent like Schwarz. But the ToQgers are suddenly called to action when the previously destroyed Bag Shadow suddenly appears. But Bag Shadow and other Shadow Creeps appearing are actually copies created by Boseki Shadow, a reckless Shadow Creep that Noir released to absorb the darkness from Castle Terminal. Marchioness Mork realizes Noir's game and leaves Barone Nero to protect their emperor while she deals with Boseki Shadow. After destroying the copies, the ToQgers realize that they saw signs of Akira's strange behavior but failed to realize it. Nearby, Mork confronts Boseki Shadow who confirms Noir's treachery before they accidentally make themselves known to the ToQgers. After Boseki Shadow is destroyed by the ToQgers' Hyper 5 Connection Crash, he fights ToQ-Oh and Diesel-Oh with copies of Fence Shadow, Jack-in-the-Box Shadow, and Pinspo Shadow. Though the ToQgers were distracted by their worries about Akira, they regain their refocus and destroy the copies before forming Cho Cho ToQ-DaiOh Police to bring Boseki Shadow down for good. Soon after, intending to find Akira, the ToQgers are informed that General Schwarz's Cryner approaching and attempt to derail him for answers. But much to their surprise, ToQgers are confronted by Akira who reveals that he is now working under General Schwarz and warns them not to interfere as he transforms. Back at Castle Terminal, with a shade of Glitta appearing next to the weakened Emperor Zet, Madame Noir decides to finally make her move.
40	"Who Is He? He Is Whom?"; Transliteration: "Dare ga Aitsu de, Aitsu ga Dare de" (Japanese: 誰があいつで あいつが誰で)	Yasuko Kobayashi	December 14, 2014
After transforming into ToQ 6gou, Akira fights the ToQgers when they refuse to leave without him. Though the ToQgers try to reason with him, Zaram assumes his true form as General Schwarz comes to him to carry out their plan. Zaram, after reminding Tokatti of their promise, accompanies Schwarz on his darkness reserve-powered Cryner to raid Castle Terminal. With the Ressha giving chase, the ToQgers talk about Akira's words while Right intends to get their friend back. At Castle Terminal, Barone Nero and Madame Noir are confounded to find Miss Glitta having taken over Emperor Zet's body. Certain that it is the opportunity she has been waiting for, Noir knocks out Barone and attempts to free her daughter. But Glitta tells her mother she cannot leave Emperor Zet's body before he regains his body and blasts Noir out of the castle. By then, Schwarz's Cryner arrives as he and Zaram fight their way to throne room. It is then that Schwarz reveals he recruited Zaram to have him kill Emperor Zet, weakened by the Darkness Decline, as ToQ 6gou. But Emperor Zet uses much of his remaining power to defeat ToQ 6gou and abduct him on the Imperial Cryner. Just as the ToQgers are about to enter the Shadow Line on the Drill Ressha, they see ToQ 6gou falling from the Imperial Cryner with Schwarz's Cryner in pursuit. But once they bring ToQ 6gou to the Ressha as Schwarz enters the Imperial Cryner, the ToQgers learn that Emperor Zet stole the AppliChanger from Zaram to seek refuge in the Ressha. But as the ToQgers discuss the turn of events, they see Miss Glitta manifesting as she requests them to stop Schwarz from saving her as she feels her separation from Emperor Zet would only result in a catastrophe for everyone. Meanwhile, returning to find Castle Terminal having tremors, Marchioness Mork learns about the situation as she tells Nero that they must find Emperor Zet. The ToQgers find Schwarz and Zaram, but are unable to give the former Glitta's message as they and the rogue Shadow Line members fight Nero and the Clothes as Hyper ToQ 1gou battle Marchioness Mork's Cryner in Hyper Reshha TeiOh. Schwarz and Zaram eventually escape in the chaos, finding a wounded Noir as she pleas their help with Glitta. But as Marchioness Mork's Cryner Robo is defeated, the unsettled Castle Terminal manifest with the ToQgers realizing it has been situated where their hometown Subarugahama used to be upon recognizing the tree where they used to play as kids next to the fortress.
41	"The Christmas Battle"; Transliteration: "Kurisumasu Daikessen" (Japanese: クリスマス大決戦)	Yasuko Kobayashi	December 21, 2014
Subarugahama is discovered to be the foundation of Castle Terminal and the ToQgers are saved from the erupting darkness by the Ressha. They form a plan to reach the Shadow Line's terminal in order to free their hometown. However, they are stopped by General Schwarz's Cryner as they emerge to attempt to reason with him and Zaram to stop for Miss Glitta's sake. General Schwarz refuses to listen and a fight ensues with Barone Nero and Marchioness Mork using the opportunity to go after Miss Glitta and extinguish her to restore Castle Terminal and enable Emperor Zet to use his full potential. Unfortunately, Emperor Zet regains control of his body and overpowers his servants before overpowering Zaram as ToQ 6gou. However, he and Hyper ToQ 1gou cancel their transformations with Right taking the AppliChanger back. From there, General Schwarz holds off Emperor Zet long enough for Madame Noir to make her move to free Miss Glitta. Unfortunately, as Miss Glitta feared would happen while watching her mother die by his hand, an enraged Emperor Zet explodes into a vast darkness that consolidates into his true form: Zet-Shin. After General Schwarz sends Miss Glitta away on his Cryner, he is killed by Zet-Shin while proclaiming that he found his light in his final words. After mercilessly attacking Marchioness Mork and Barone Nero, Zet-Shin unleashes another torrent of darkness that drags Castle Terminal back into the Shadow Line while Zaram attempts to stop him. After the ToQgers awake, they find Akira alive but upset that he could not save their town. The ToQgers hug him, surprising him, and tell him how much he means to them. Suddenly, a fleet of Cryners appear and attack, and Akira agrees to remain with the ToQgers to help them get their town back, as they use the various Ressha combinations to destroy the enemy Cryners. Later, as the ToQgers welcome Akira into their Christmas party, Miss Glitta visits General Schwarz's gravesite, built by Akira, and Emperor Zet notes how Castle Terminal has gotten darker.
42	"Words to Reach You"; Transliteration: "Kimi ni Todoku Kotoba" (Japanese: 君に届く言葉)	Yasuko Kobayashi	December 28, 2014
At the Hyper Ressha Terminal, the Conductor decides to give the ToQgers a New Year's Eve party to cope with what they been through. Providing entertainment, Akira explains to the ToQgers that Castle Terminal is now protected by Emperor Zet's darkness and that the switch point leading to the Shadow Line terminal will be gone soon. Though the others want to make an assault on Castle Terminal to free Subarugahama, Mio agrees with Akira that they should not go in headstrong as Tokatti realizes she is holding her emotions back. The group is soon found by Wagon as she gives them an Imagination Letter Set so they express their true feelings in letters they can send to their families, while sending Akira to observe the Castle Terminal Switch Point. Eventually, after Tokatti leaves, the other ToQgers eventually decide to write to their families of the adventures that they have had over the course of the year. Mio soon gets a call from Tokatti to meet him outside for some onigiri to help her commit to writing her true feelings. After the letters are finished, the Ressha reaches the Switch Point as the Conductor arrives on the Diesel Ressha with the Rainbow Line's Railway Maintenance Crew Band. Given the Post Ressha after it has been filled with their letters, the ToQgers use the Rainbow Rush to send their letters into the Shadow Line before the Switch Point fades. Some time later, as Tokatti and Mio realize they have feelings for each other, the ToQgers reaffirm their vow to save their town.
43	"The Locked Door"; Transliteration: "Akanai Tobira" (Japanese: 開かない扉)	Yasuko Kobayashi	January 11, 2015
Upon returning to Castle Terminal with Barone Nero, Marchioness Mork sees that Emperor Zet has accepted that he can never obtain the light, deciding to confirm a theory she has over the cause of Emperor Zet's obsession. Later, after Kagura wakes up from a nightmare where her family does not recognize her all grown up, the Ressha comes under attack by the Shadow Creep Dollhouse Shadow. Overpowering the ToQgers, Dollhouse Shadow sucks ToQ 4gou and ToQ 5gou into a dollhouse before running off. After knocking Hikari and Kagura out, Dollhouse Shadow sends out a challenge to the ToQgers to meet him in Moriiwadake Station within five minutes or he will burn the dollhouse containing Hikari and Kagura. This infuriates Right as he and the others run towards Moriiwadake, fighting their way through several Clothes. But Dollhouse Shadow gets bored and starts to burn the dollhouse prematurely, with Hikari and Kagura's escape route out blocked. After Hikari figures out a means of escape involving his kendama, inspired by seeing Kagura's restored shoe outside after it managed to get out but she did not, he helps ease Kagura's mind with his own resolve to protect his family. Though it seems they have died in the burning dollhouse just as their teammates arrive, ToQ 1gou taking it hardest, ToQ 4gou and ToQ 5gou reveal themselves alive and well as they overpower Dollhouse Shadow before the Shadow Creep is destroyed by Hyper ToQ 1gou. The enlarged Dollhouse Shadow then attempts to trap Cho Cho ToQ-DaiOh in another dollhouse, only to get sucked in as well and easily destroyed within. Marchioness Mork has observed the events the whole time, and has her suspicions about Right confirmed as she says the youth is the reason why Emperor Zet subsumed Subarugahama in particular. Elsewhere, ToQ 6gou is troubled from sensing a familiar darkness coming from Right's body.
44	"To Subarugahama"; Transliteration: "Subarugahama e" (Japanese: 昴ヶ浜へ)	Yasuko Kobayashi	January 18, 2015
On the Ressha, Akira is still bothered by the darkness emitted from Right's body when it seemed Hikari and Kagura were killed. But before he can mull on this thought longer, the Conductor announces to the ToQgers that the President has summoned them to the Hyper Ressha Terminal. The President, using a special fan that exposes what he and Akira suspected, confirms that the darkness coming from Right's body is that of Emperor Zet himself. Noting that the youth has no exact memory of the event prior to coming to on Bag Shadow's Cryner rather than on the Ressha like the other ToQgers, the president believes this turn of events may be connected to Right's first meeting with Emperor Zet on the night Subarugahama was consumed in darkness. Soon after, Miss Glitta arrives on General Schwarz's Cryner to help the ToQgers reach Castle Terminal while presenting a plan to save their hometown by taking the fortress back into the dark depths. The ToQgers agree to act out her plan, but Right gets tied up by his friends as they do not want him to accompany him in fear for his wellbeing should he and Emperor Zet come into contact. Once in the world of darkness, the ToQgers find opposition from the Castle Keeper Pawn. Hyper ToQ 6gou holds Pawn off in Build DaiOh while the other trains are derailed by Emperor Zet's power. The ToQgers are forced to fend off the Clothes as they help give Glitta safe passage to Castle Terminal, but they learn that Right has escaped his bindings and sneaked aboard the Ressha to confront Emperor Zet over their connection. As the ToQgers succeed in their mission, Right finds Emperor Zet and realizes he also has no memory of their first meeting. But as Right's attempt to transform causes the darkness inside him to manifest, Emperor Zet regains enough of his memory to remember that the light he saw in Subarugahama was Right himself and is shocked to find the youth transformed into a dark-version of his ToQ 1gou form.
45	"The Home We Left Behind"; Transliteration: "Kimi ga Satta Hōmu" (Japanese: 君が去ったホーム)	Yasuko Kobayashi	January 25, 2015
Miss Glitta begins to relocate Castle Terminal while Hyper ToQ 6gou drags Baron Nero and Marchioness Mork out of the fortress, freeing Subarugahama from the darkness. But the victory is short lived when the ToQgers find Dark ToQ 1gou fighting Zet-Shin on equal terms before Baron Nero and Marchioness Mork retrieve their master on a Cryner that they use to chase after Castle Terminal. Akira then takes the unconscious Right to Ressha, the president revealing that Right absorbed some of Emperor Zet's darkness the night Subarugahama was consumed in the darkness. This event created a symbiosis between Right and Emperor Zet that has been affecting both sides with each encounter and culminated with Right's Dark ToQ 1gou form. Meanwhile, Emperor Zet finds Glitta and learns that her actions were an act of mercy and pity to him. After apparently killing Glitta, now intent on destroying all light if he cannot have it, Zet-Shin decides to mount an assault on the world and orders Castle Terminal to surface. Meanwhile, as the other ToQgers are delighted at the sight of their hometown restore, Right learns from the president that no one in Subarugahama will remember him as a consequence of being in the darkness for too long. When Right asks if there is chance for the others not to share his fate, he learns he must destroy their Rainbow Passes to have them forget being ToQgers. Getting the passes as Akira alerts him to Castle Terminal's appearance, Right abandons his friends in the Ressha. After Wagon regretfully burns the passes, Tokatti and the others revert to their original childhood forms and lose all memory of their days as ToQgers. Akira makes sure the ToQgers return to their families and normal lives. Back on the Ressha, after finally resolving his frustration with getting Ticket off the Conductor's hand, Right decides to storm Castle Terminal on his own. While Akira rushes to assist him, Right faces the army of Clothes as Dark ToQ 1gou but is unable to imagine himself winning this battle.
46	"The Last Stop"; Transliteration: "Saigo no Ikisaki" (Japanese: 最後の行き先)	Yasuko Kobayashi	February 8, 2015 (Note: Episode 46 was originally scheduled to air on February 1, 2015. However, TV Asahi postponed the airing due to the media coverage of the death of Japanese journalist Kenji Goto by the Islamic State of Iraq and the Levant.)
After leaving his friends behind so they can return to their normal lives, Right proceeds to fight his way through the Kuros despite not being able to imagine himself winning. But as he faces Marchioness Mork and Barone Nero while calling Emperor Zet out to fight him, Right begins to feel the strain of his inner darkness with Hyper ToQ 6gou arriving in time to get him to safety. On the Ressha, Right reveals the darkness inside him has begun to spread as he promises not to ditch Akira and head out on his own again. By the time Right regains his strength, he and Akira make another attack on Castle Terminal with the Conductor, Ticket, and Wagon wanting to join the fight. As Build DaiOh Police holds off Nero and his Cho-Cryner Robo in a fight that damages both robots, Right reaches Castle Terminal with Emperor Zet emerging to greet him. After Emperor Zet inquires about Right no longer having his inner light, the two begin their fight with Zet-Shin derailing the Ressha when the Conductor, Ticket, and Wagon attempt to run him over. Once Dark ToQ 1gou is defeated, Zet-Shin has Castle Terminal transform into a monster that blankets the entire city and Subarugahama in darkness before Emperor Zet leaves a powerless Right to waste away in the dark. But as the events are unfolding, Tokatti and the others head to their secret base on the last day of the Star-Gazing festival. However, as Mio finds a fifth piece of candy on her, the children begin to feel they are missing somebody. They then find something completely unexpected: photos of their older selves with Right that Akira placed on the tree for Wagon. This causes the children to regain their memories as ToQgers, using the photos as passes to regain entry into the Ressha and enter the growing darkness to find their friend.
47 (Final)	"A Shining Thing"; Transliteration: "Kagayaiteiru Mono" (Japanese: 輝いているもの)	Yasuko Kobayashi	February 15, 2015
Defeated by Zet-Shin and left to wither in the dark, Right finds himself hopeless as the Ressha finds him. Shocked to find Tokatti, Mio, Hikari, and Kagura giving up their chance to return home in order to get him, Right apologizes to them for taking such decision without consulting them. Trapped inside the darkness, the ToQgers see one of the lanterns from the Stargazing festival held by Right's mother, who is revealed to also have faint memories of Right. The lights from the lanterns create a pathway for the Ressha, which Emperor Zet remembers what attracted him to Subarugahama in the first place. At the same time, Akira faces Barone Nero before the Ressha breaks free from the darkness and he rejoins the others. By combining all their Ressha in one single train, the ToQgers bring down the Dark Behemoth. With the Shadow Line greatly weakened with the Dark Behemoth's destruction, the final battle begins with ToQ 1gou facing Zet-Shin as ToQ 6gou defeat Nero and the others overpower Mork. After Emperor Zet is hit by the Yudou Rainbow Rush, Nero and Mork sacrifice themselves for their leader to restore his power by absorbing their darkness. However, the other ToQgers give ToQ 1gou their Ressha to use them, combined with the Hyper Ressha to become Rainbow ToQ 1gou. This allows ToQ 1gou to overpower Zet-Shin with all of his power before he and his friends use the Daikaiten Cannon for the final blow. Returned to his usual form, the dying Emperor Zet explodes into a torrent of darkness that is gathered by Glitta, revealed to have been spared by him, as she brings the reconstituted emperor back into the darkness. Despite that their mission is over, the ToQgers, believing they can't return home anymore, resolve to continue traveling in the Rainbow Line, but the President bids farewell to them instead, claiming that their journey is finally over, as they learn, much to their surprise, that their new years' letters reached their parents as their families arrive to welcome them home, including Right. The ToQgers return to their childhood forms at that moment, bidding farewell to Akira and the others as the Ressha departs as they resume their normal lives.
