= Cup-and-ball =

Traditional children's toy

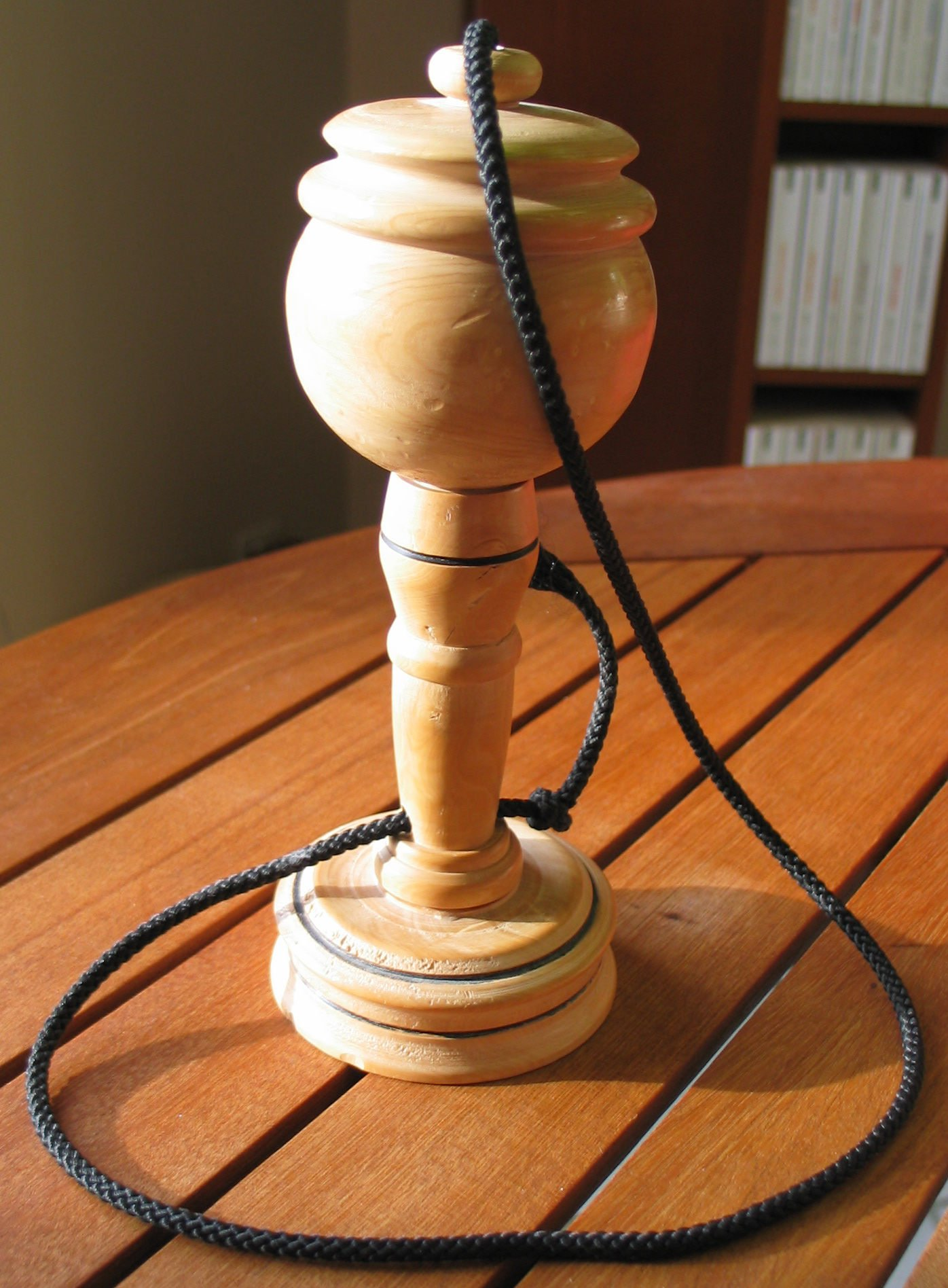
- French bilboquet
- Playing time: About 45 seconds to a few minutes per round
- Chance: Low
- Age range: 2+
- Skills: Hand-eye coordination

Cup-and-ball (or ball in a cup) or ring and pin is a traditional children's toy. It is generally a wooden handle to which a small ball is attached by a string and that has one or two cups, or a spike, upon which the player tries to catch the ball. It is popular in Spanish-speaking countries, where it is called by a wide number of names (including boliche in Spain, Capirucho in El Salvador and balero in most of Hispanic America), and was historically popular in France as the bilboquet. A similar toy with three cups and a spike called kendama is very popular in Japan and has spread globally in popularity.

== History ==
The game was created in the 14th century and has been improved in different ways since then.

=== Americas ===
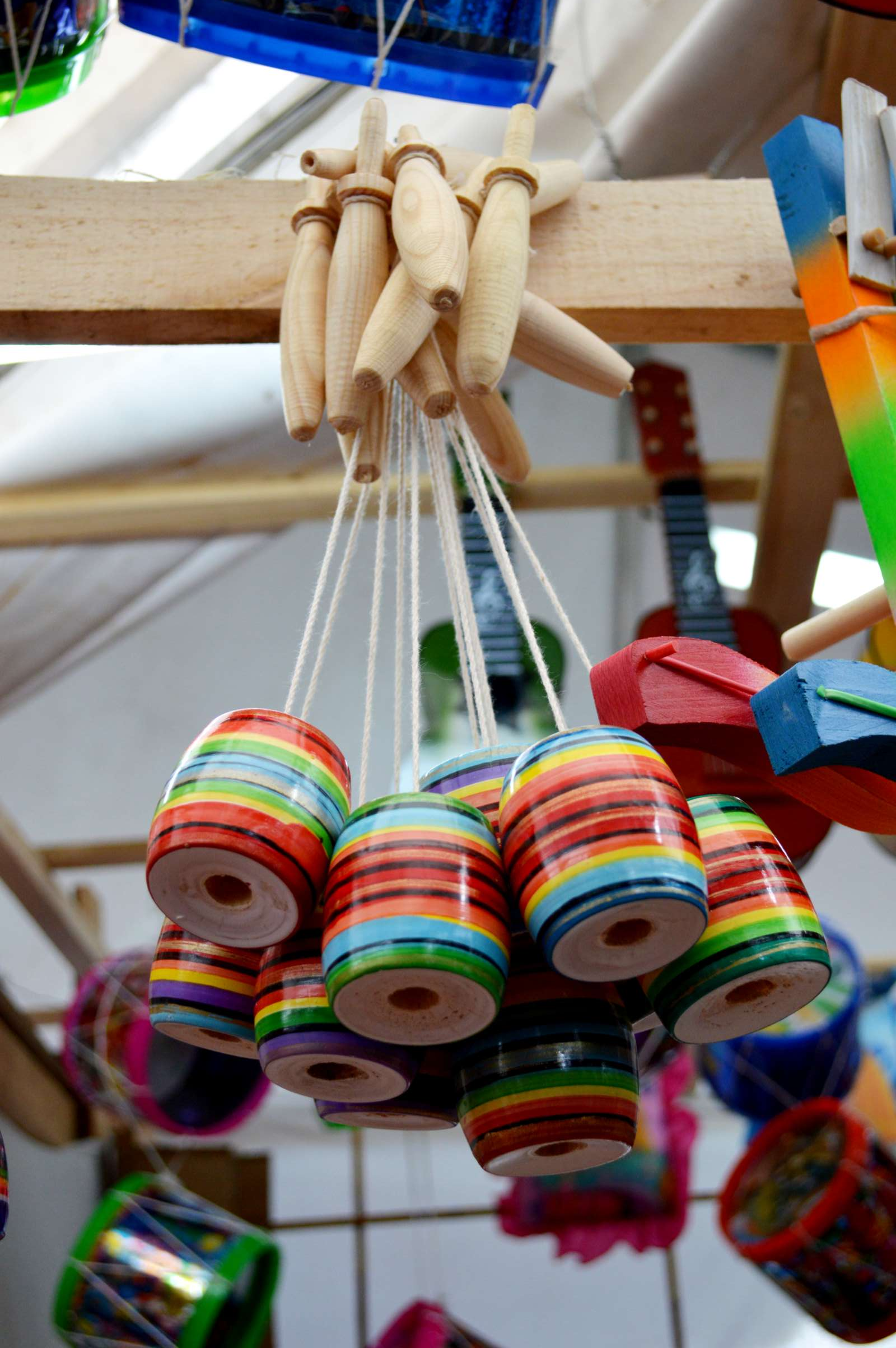
Baleros at a tianguis in Uruapan, Michoacan, Mexico

Balero demonstration in Mexico showing a common technique of landing the cup on the stick

In North America it was both a child's toy and a gambling mechanism for adults, and involved catching a ring rather than a ball. In some Native American tribes it was even a courtship device, where suitors would challenge the objects of their interest to a polite game of ring and pin. The Mohave variant of the game included up to 17 extra rings attached to the cord, and game scoring involved differing point values assigned to different rings. Other variants include those played by the Inuit of what is now Labrador, with a rabbit's skull in place of the ball, with extra holes bored into it, which had to be caught on the handle like a skewer; and those that used balls of grass or animal hair. Ring and pin games in general were known as ᐊᔭᒐᒃ ajagak, ayagak, and ᐊᔭᖁᒃᑐᒃ ajaquktuk in Inuit dialects.

=== France ===
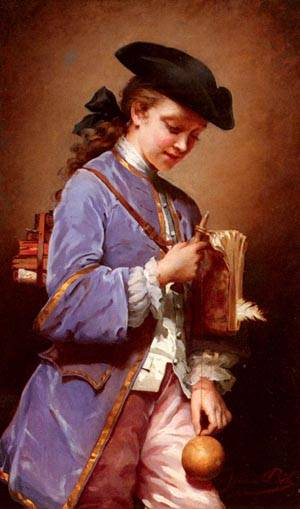
Jeanne Bôle's L'Enfant au Bilboquet (around 1880)

The cup-and-ball is noted in France as early as the sixteenth century. The game was played by King Henry III of France as historical records note, though his playing was considered evidence of his mental instability. After his death, the game went out of fashion, and for a century the game was only remembered by a small number of enthusiasts such as the Marquis de Bièvre.

The game had its golden age during the reign of Louis XV—among the upper classes people owned baleros made of ivory. Actors also sometimes appeared with them in scenes. The game was very popular in the 18th and 19th centuries. Jean-Jacques Rousseau mentions the game early in his Confessions when stating his reservations about idle talk and hands, saying "If ever I went back into society I should carry a cup-and-ball in my pocket, and play with it all day long to excuse myself from speaking when I had nothing to say."

=== Iberian world ===
The game is very popular in the Spanish and Portuguese diaspora. The name varies across many countries—in El Salvador and Guatemala it is called capirucho; in Argentina, Ecuador, Colombia, Mexico, and Uruguay it is called balero; in Spain it is boliche; in Portugal and Brazil it is called bilboquê; in Chile it is emboque; in Colombia it is called coca; and in Venezuela the game is called perinola.

In 1960, American lexicographer Charles Keilus (1919–1997) documented the term zingo paya for a cup-and-ball game in Tijuana, Mexico, and formed the Zingo Paya Society in Los Angeles to promote the toy and its collection.

=== England ===
This game was also popular in England during the early 19th century. Jane Austen is reputed to have excelled while entertaining her nephew George in a game called Bilbo Catcher. In a letter to her sister Cassandra she describes how George is "indefatigable" at the game. Her other nephew, James Edward Austen-Leigh, later praised Austen's own skills at the game, saying "she has been known to catch it on the point above a hundred times in succession, til her hand was weary".

There is one picture in the National Portrait Gallery of a young girl playing the game. It appears to be a copy of a painting by Philippe Mercier, although the original painting has not been found. Unlike other 18th-century toys, which are found repeatedly in artwork, cup-and-ball games are rare, with only two pictures known, one copied from the other.

=== Japan ===
The game of kendama is believed to have arrived in Japan around the middle Edo period in the 18th century, and the game underwent significant modernization and standardization in the early 20th century, becoming internationally popular in the 21st century.

=== Germany ===
In 2011, a German company, TicToys, began to create a toy with the name Ticayo.

== Gameplay ==
The main goal of the game is to get the ball into the cup. While the concept is very easy, mastering the game can sometimes be challenging.

There are several styles of gameplay in the Latin world such as la simple, la doble, la vertical, and la mariquita.
