= Kendama =

Japanese cup and ball game

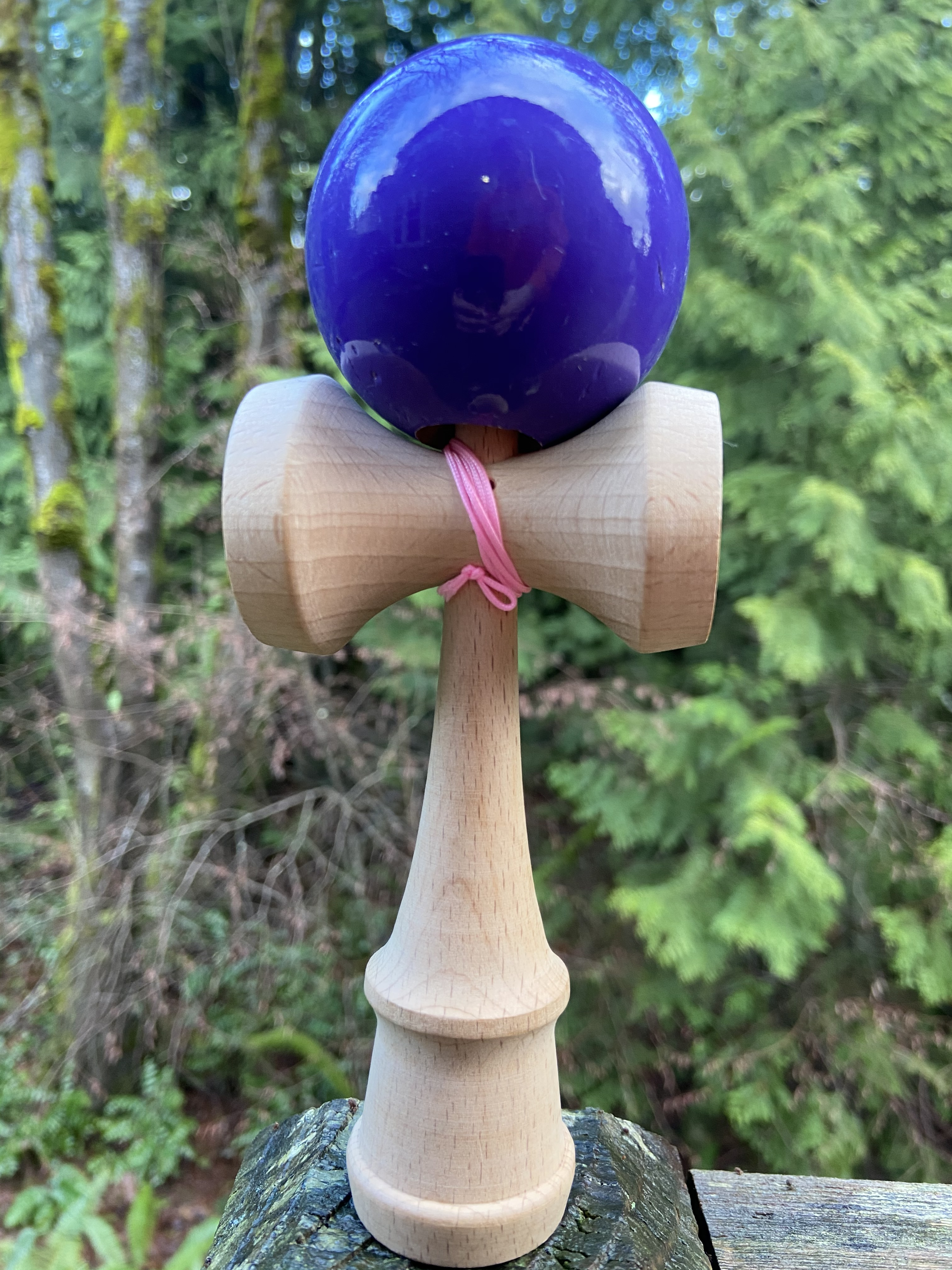
Kendama

The kendama (けん玉; lit. 'sword and ball'; Japanese pronunciation: [kè̞ń.dä́.mä́, ké̞ń.-]) is a traditional Japanese skill toy; nowadays, it is considered a skill sport or competitive discipline. It consists of a handle (ken), a pair of cups (sarado), and a ball (tama) that are all connected together by a string. On one end of the ken is a cup, while the other end of ken is narrowed down, forming a spike (kensaki) that fits into the hole (ana) of the tama. The kendama is the Japanese version of the classic cup-and-ball game, and is also a variant of the French cup-and-ball game bilboquet. Kendama can be held in different grips, and many tricks and combinations can be performed. The game is played by tossing the ball into the air and attempting to catch it on the stick point.

The origins of kendama are disputed, but it is generally believed to have originated during the 17th or 18th century. Kendama started to evolve when it came to Japan during the Edo period, and since then the use of the toy has spread throughout the world. The size and materials used to create kendamas now vary as they are offered in jumbo and mini sizes, and have been created out of plastic, metal, and nylon. There are now kendama competitions held in countries all over the world, the biggest competition being the annual Kendama World Cup in Japan.

== Terminology and structure ==
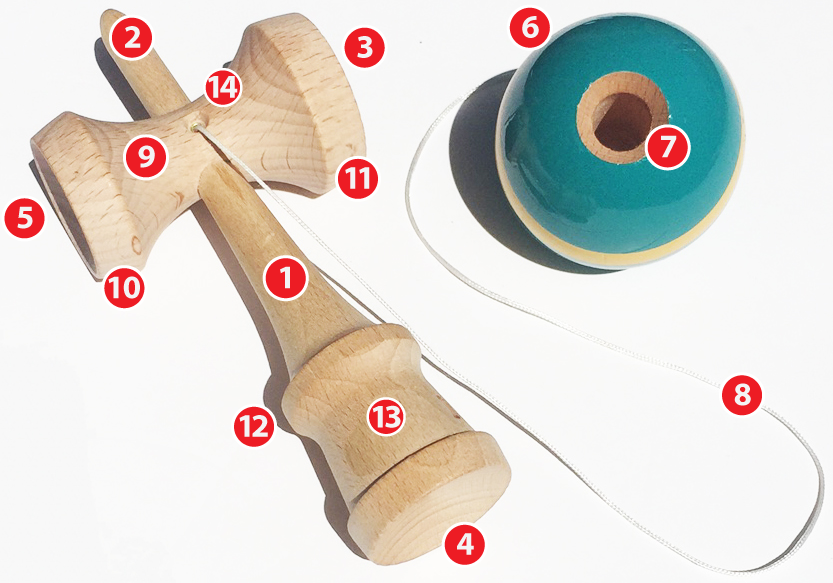
Anatomy of kendama

The kendama is traditionally made out of wood and comprises the following parts:

1. Main body ken (剣).
2. Spike kensaki (剣先).
3. Big cup ōzara (大皿).
4. Base cup chūzara (中皿).
5. Small cup kozara (小皿).
6. Ball tama (玉).
7. Hole ana (穴).
8. String ito (糸).
9. Cup body saradō (皿胴).
10. Small cup edge kozara no fuchi (小皿のふち).
11. Big cup for lunars ōzara no fuchi (大皿のふち).
12. Slip-stop or slip grip suberidome (すべり止め).
13. Back end kenjiri (けんじり).
14. String attachment hole ito toritsuke ana (糸取り付け穴).

=== Stringing a kendama ===
"Stringing" a kendama is the action of connecting all three pieces of the kendama (ken, sarado, and tama) together. A bead (or mini bearing) and a piece of string are required to string a kendama. The steps to string a kendama are as follows:

1. Take one end of the string and put it through the little hole in the tama until the string is coming through the big hole (ana).
2. Put the bead on the end of the string coming out of the ana and tie a knot to lock the bead in.
3. Put the untied end of the string through one of the two holes in the sarado. (Note: For a right-handed kendama, hold the sarado up so that the big cup is on the right side and put the string through the hole that is facing self. For a left-handed kendama, make sure the big cup is on the left side and put the string through the hole facing self).
4. Lead the string through the hole in the ken.
5. Tie a knot at that end of the string so the string doesn't slip through the ken piece.
6. Put the sarado down on top of the ken.

=== Grips ===
A kendama can be held in numerous types of grips. Choosing the type of grip to hold the kendama depends on which trick a person wants to perform. Some of these grips include:

- Ken grip: Hold the ken with all five fingers with the spike pointing upwards and the big cup (or small cup) facing towards the body
- Sara grip: hold the ken by placing the thumb and index finger below the intersection of the sarado and ken
- Sara grip (stabilized): In addition to the thumb and index finger placement, Place the middle and ring finger underneath the small cup or big cup (this depends on which way the ken is facing).
- Tama grip: With the fingertips, hold the ball (tama) with the hole (ana) facing upwards.
- Candle grip: Face the ken with the spike pointed downward. Hold the ken with three fingers: index, middle, and the thumb.

== Gameplay ==
The general concept of kendama is pulling the ken up and balancing the tama somewhere on the ken, or vice versa. There are not any specific rules on how to play kendama. However, bending the knees while playing kendama is a method that experts use. Endless tricks and trick combinations can be made with just ken grip, sara grip, tama grip, and candle grip by themselves or together in a combination. Some examples of tricks in each of these grips are as follows:

=== Ken grip ===
Spike: This trick involves the hole in the tama and the spike.

1. Hold the ken with the spike pointing straight up
2. Hold the ball with the off hand to ensure the ball is still before starting the motion of this trick
3. Bend the knees
4. Pull the tama up with the entire body
5. Catch the ball in the spike by directing the spike underneath the hole in the tama

Swing Spike: a variation of the Spike.

1. Hold the ken in a way similar to preparing a spike
2. Hold the ball with the opposite hand and slightly bring it back towards the body, keeping the tension in the string
3. Let go of the ball and swing the ball out in front of self
4. Tug the string a bit to make the ball rotate the hole 360° towards self
5. Catch the tama on the spike by connecting the spike and the hole together.

Around Japan: This trick is a combination of the big cup, small cup, and the spike.

1. Pull the ball up into the small cup
2. Hop the ball over to the big cup by rotating the wrist to the right (and vice versa if left handed)
3. Keep an eye on the hole, and hop the ball up onto the spike, connecting the hole and spike together

Note: The following combination is also ok: big cup→small cup→spike.

Note: This trick can also be done in sara grip.

Around the World: Similar to Around the Block, with the addition of the spike.

1. Follow all the steps from "Around the Block"
2. Keep an eye on the hole, and from the bottom cup, hop the ball up and catch the ball by landing the hole on to the spike

Both of these tricks can also be done in "sara grip."

Bird: This trick involves the ball, the hole, the spike, and the big cup or small cup edge.

1. Hold the ken with the spike facing upwards with the big cup (or small cup) facing towards self
2. Tilt the kendama slightly away from self
3. Bend the knees, and extend them while pulling the ball straight up
4. Balance the hole of the ball on the big cup edge (or small cup edge) while the ball leans against the spike

=== Sara grip ===
Moshikame: This is a combination of the big cup and bottom cup.

1. Pull the ball up into the big cup
2. Bend the knees and hop the ball up into the air
3. While the ball is in mid-air, rotate the ken downwards so that the bottom cup is facing up
4. Catch the ball in the bottom cup.

Clack back: This trick uses the big cup (or small cup) and the end of the handle.

1. Pull the ball up onto the big cup
2. Lean the ken about 45° downward so that the basecup turns starts to face toward the ground, causing the ball to start to fall off the big cup
3. "Clack" (hit) the ball with the back end of the ken
4. Catch the ball on the big cup

=== Tama grip ===
Airplane: This trick involves the hole in the ball and the spike. "Airplane" mirrors the movement pattern of "Swing Spike."

1. Hold the ball with the hole facing upwards
2. Grab the ken with the off hand to stabilize it
3. With the offhand, slightly pull the ken back
4. Release the ken with the off hand
5. Pull ken in mid-air so it rotates 180° towards self, making the ken face downwards
6. Catch the spike in the hole

Lighthouse: This trick involves the base cup and the ball.

1. Hold the ken steady with the off hand to stabilize it
2. Pull the ken gently upwards, having the ken rise above the tama and ensuring the ken stays stable throughout the movement
3. Place the ball under the bottom cup as the ken rises higher than the ball
4. Balance the ken on top of the ball

Lunar: this trick involves the big cup and the ball.

1. Grab the ken with the off hand to stabilize it
2. With the offhand, slightly pull the ken back
3. While releasing, give the ken a slight twist so the big cup is facing you
4. Pull the ken back to you in a similar fashion to the "airplane" trick, and then land the ken on the tama on its big cup
5. Balance the ken on its big cup on top of the ball

=== Candle grip ===
Candlestick: This trick involves the base cup.

1. Pull or swing the ball upwards onto the bottom cup

== History ==
=== Origins, Precursors, and Parallels ===
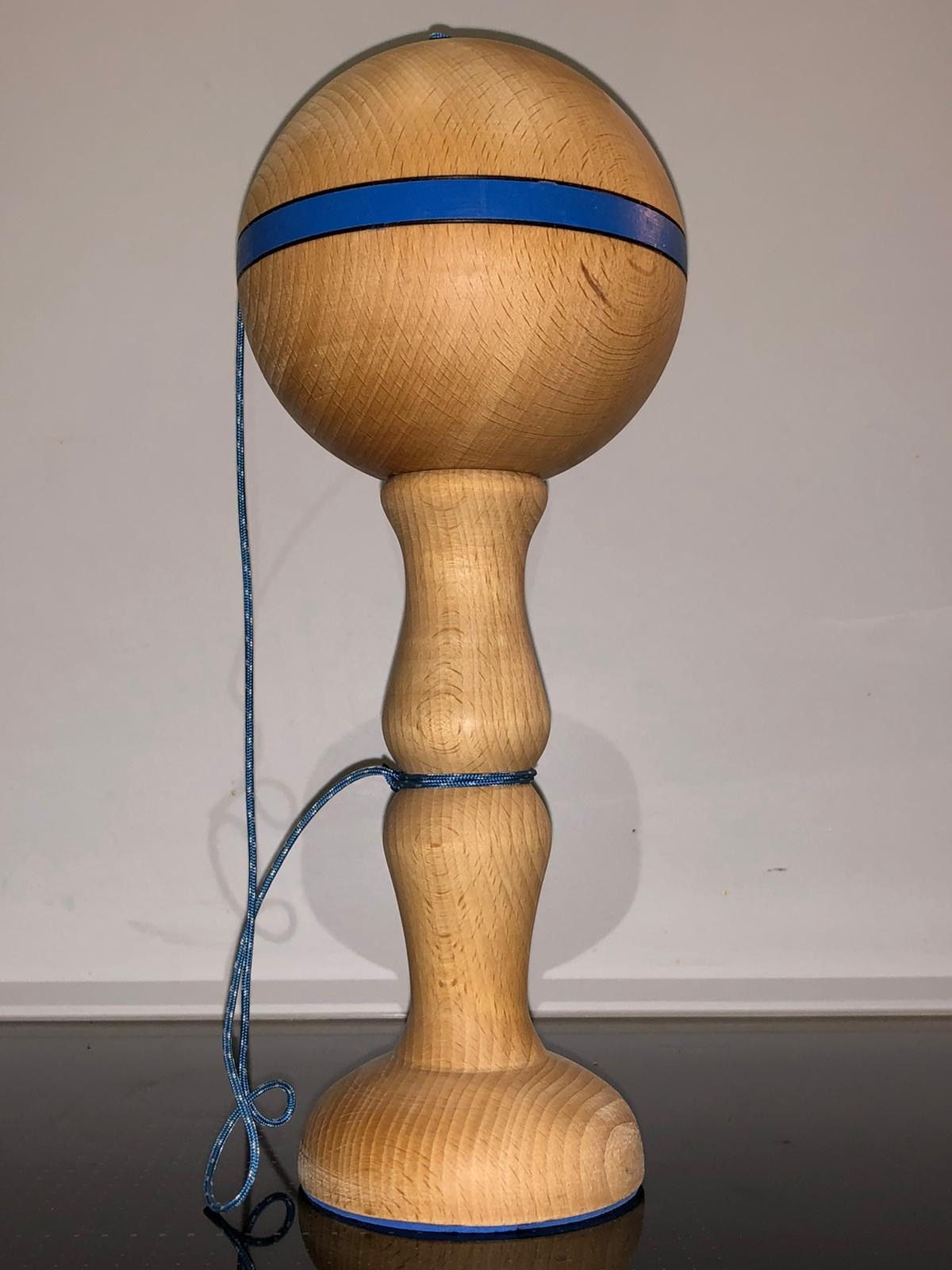
Bilboquet, a cup-and-ball toy of European origin

The origins of the game are disputed. It is believed by some to be a variant of the French ball-and-cup game bilboquet (bil "ball" boquet "small tree"), a toy that dates back to the 16th century and was popular in Europe during the 17th century. During that same period the kendama is believed to have arrived in Japan via the Silk Road from China during the Edo period (1600-1868).

Hatsukaichi City in Hiroshima Prefecture is considered to be the birthplace of the modern Japanese Kendama due to the city becoming the first place for kendama manufacturing. Hamagatsu Ekusa created the shape of the kendama that is widely recognized today in 1919 in Kure city. During the early 20th century the toy had two side cups and was called a jitsugetsu ball (日月ボール)., literally translating to "sun and moon ball", because of the ball's representation of the sun and the cups' likeness to the crescent moon.

=== Models ===
Despite not being originated in Japan, the shape of kendama that is known today was formed and evolved in Japan.

The dates of when the following 3 kendama models were made or seen are undocumented:

"Deer horn and ball" was the form that the kendama took on when it arrived in Japan for the first time, literally a deer horn attached to a ball. Later on, some people replaced the deer horn with a piece of bamboo due to deer horn costing too many resources, making the bamboo and ball. The next model started to resemble what the kendama looks like today: the ken and ball. This model was a ken piece strung to the ball.

The jisugetsu ball kendama model was the first model made by Ekusa (1919), and later went on to be produced as many as 300,000 times in one year by Hongo woodworking factory in Hatsukaichi (1921). The jisugetsu has a similar design as lined folk craft kendamas, which were made by factories that also produced Kokeshi dolls from spinning lathe machines. The strings of both the jisugetsu ball and folk craft kendamas were placed on the ken using a loose metal fitting, making the string prone to detaching or breaking.

The S (Shinma)-Type kendama was the first competition style kendama invented in 1975 by Hideo Shinma, the president of the Tokyo Kendama Club. The first S-type prototype emerged in 1976, and the Japan Kendama Association (JKA) asked Shinma to make them a competition style model based on the S-Type design in 1977.

The F (Fujiwara)-Type (F16) kendama emerged in 1978, invented by Issei Fujiwara. The F-Type incorporated new modifications unknown to kendamas at the time. The F-Type had two small holes drilled in the middle of each side of the sarado, and also used a sturdier string that was unlikely to break. The two string holes in the sarado offer more fluidity of play as well as the option to switch the kendama between left handed or right handed.

The Tortoise kendama by Tortoise, Inc. was a take on the S-type kendama after the S-type discontinued in 1990. Tortoise kendamas came in different models: the T-8, T-14, T-16, and T-17. The numbers indicating each different Tortoise model corresponds with the height of each model in centimeters. Tortoise kendamas stopped production in 2012 due to not having enough resources.

The F16-2, the second version of the F16, was released in 2001. The main change in the F16-2 from the F16 is that the position of the string hole was moved slightly off from the cup body's center, enabling the kendama to turn and rotate in a new fluid way. This string hole adjustment is still used in various shapes of kendamas to this day.

== Contemporary culture ==
Students in a kendama session.

Kendama has increased in popularity since its initial evolution in Japan. During the 2000s, kendama surged in popularity outside Japan, which influenced the creation of the first kendama companies in foreign countries.

The first kendama company in the United States was Kendama USA in 2006. They began to promote kendama in North America and were able to reach the winter sports, BMX, and rollerblading communities.

In the European Kendama scene, Kendama Europe—founded in 2008—was the pioneering company of the late 2000s. The company released its first competition model in 2011 and contributed to the spread of Kendama across Europe and beyond by hosting Kendama events and attending the International Toy Fair in Nuremberg, the world’s largest toy fair.

Almost every kendama company has a team of sponsored players to help promote their brands. Sponsored players range in age and location around the world.

The kendama community connects through social media platforms such as Instagram, YouTube, Facebook, TikTok, Twitch and Twitter.

=== Robotics ===
Kendama play has also been used as a measure of accuracy, agility, and learning ability in robotic arms.

== Rules ==
There are no specific rules on how to play kendama. However, all forms of kendama competition are regulated by rules. Four styles of kendama competition are speed ladder, open division, freestyle, and Kendama World Cup (KWC). It is rare that the KWC style of competing is used as an event other than KWC itself.

=== Speed Ladder ===
The speed ladder is a style of competition that is a race of who can finish a set of tricks the fastest. Players will race through an order of tricks that they are given at the event or prior to the event via the internet. The players who finish the trick ladder the fastest wins. There are divisions that sign up to compete in based on their skill level (ex: beginner, intermediate, and advanced/pro).

=== Open Division ===
Open Division is a head-to-head 1vs1 competition style format. Each round, two players compete against each other and take turns drawing a trick at random. Each trick drawn warrants a maximum of three exchanges – the number of times the players can go back and forth attempting the trick. The first player to 3 points wins.

- If a player completes the trick and the other player misses, the successful player earns 1 point and the other player draws another trick.
- If both players complete or miss the trick, then the 1st exchange comes to an end and the first player gets another attempt to complete the trick in the second bout, restarting the process.
- If both players complete or miss the trick in all three bouts, then the trick is discarded and the second player draws a new trick.

Note: In the final round, the first player to 5 points wins.

Note: The labeled champion of each event is usually referring to the Open Division winner.

=== Freestyle ===
Freestyle is a head-to-head 1vs1 style of competition. Each match is judged by a panel of three or five judges. The two players competing against each other in each round will take turns performing tricks in 45-second time periods twice each. During the time periods, both players may perform any trick that they choose.

Each judge individually decides which player wins based on who did the best in the following three categories: Creativity, Consistency, and Difficulty. The player with the most votes wins the round.

=== KWC ===
One hundred and twenty tricks are released online prior to the KWC and are split up into groups of 10 tricks each 12 times, forming a level 1 to 12 trick list. The higher level a trick is, the more difficult it is and the more points it is worth. KWC is split into 2 days of competition: Day 1: Qualifying, and Day 2: Finals. Each day has its own set of rules.

During Day 1, all players choose 12 tricks from the levels 1–10 in the trick list. Players split the 12 tricks into two rounds of six tricks each, and each player will get 3 minutes for each round to complete as many tricks as possible. The 25 players with the highest point scores will advance to Day 2.

Note: The number of points each trick is worth is equivalent to the face value of the level of the trick (ex. level 6 trick is worth 6 points).

During Day 2, the players compete one by one from the lowest scoring qualifying player to the highest scoring qualifying player. Each player has three minutes to do an unlimited number of tricks from levels 3–12, and each trick can only be done once. The player who gets the highest number of points in their time period wins.

Note: The number of points each trick is worth is equivalent to the level of that trick squared (ex. level 6 trick is worth 36 points), with the exception of level 11 tricks (worth 151 points) and level 12 tricks (worth 194 points).

== Competitions ==
Kendama competitions have been occurring since 1979, with the first competition being the All Japan Kendama-Do Championships held by the Japan Kendama Association. The British Kendama Association was the first group to hold a formal kendama contest outside Japan in 2008 at the British Juggling Convention in Doncaster. Kendama competitions have taken a variety of formats including speed ladders, freestyle, head-to-head, and world championship style.

Typically at these events, there are vendors that sell kendamas, clothing, and accessories. Competitions can range from 1–3 days long and prizes are provided for the 1st, 2nd, and 3rd-place winners of each competition category. These take place across the globe. Popular competitions include the North American Kendama Open, the Kendama World Cup (KWC)and the European Kendama Championship (EKC).

=== Major Competitions ===
Currently, there are five major competitions in Kendama. Winning a major competition is regarded as winning a world title due to the high attendance of competitors from all around the world, typically with 500 or more participants. Pro players from Asia, Europe, and the US regularly compete in these events.

==== Kendama World Cup ====
Starting in 2014, the Kendama World Cup (KWC) is an annual two-day event in the summer that takes place in Hatsukaichi, Hiroshima, Japan and is the largest kendama competition in the world. In 2018 alone, the KWC had an audience of 49,000 members that were watching 415 competitors from 18 countries compete for the title of Kendama World Champion.

At KWC, there is also an abundance of vendors selling their merchandise and kendamas, kendama games, and live performances all spread out over the 2 days of the event. Admission to the KWC is free.

KWC Winners
Year	Winner	2nd Place	3rd Place
2026	(Japan) Yasuhito Chiba	(Japan) Takuya Igarashi	(Japan) Ryoga Kawamoto
2025	(Japan) Ryoga Kawamoto	(Japan) Takuya Igarashi	(Romania) Adrian Vilau
2024	(Japan) Ryoga Kawamoto	(Japan) Takuya Igarashi	(Japan) Hiroto Motohashi
2023	(Japan) Takuya Igarashi	(Japan) Hiroto Motohashi	(Japan) Maharu Tashiro
2022	(Japan) Takuya Igarashi	(Japan) So Kanada	(Japan) Hiroto Motohashi
2021	(Japan) Yasuhito Chiba	(Japan) Maharu Tashiro	(Romania) Tiberiu Terteleac
2020	(Japan) Takuya Igarashi	(Japan) Hiroto Motohashi	(Japan) Maharu Tashiro
2019	(Japan) Rui Sora	(United States) Nick Gallagher	(Japan) Hiroto Motohashi
2018	(United States) Nick Gallagher	(Japan) So Kanada	(Japan) Rumina Yakabi
2017	(Japan) So Kanada	(United States) Bryson Lee	(Israel) Liad Kotlarker
2016	(United States) Bryson Lee	(United States) Lukas Funk	(Japan) Kazuki Nagata
2015	(United States) Wyatt Bray	(United States) Lukas Funk	(United States) Nic Stodd
2014	(United States) Bonz Atron	(United States) Kris Bosh	(Japan) Satoru Akimoto

==== Catch and Flow ====
Catch and Flow, Freestyle World Championship was first held in September 2014 in downtown Tokyo, Japan. Using a new format to determine the best freestyle skills in the world, the Catch and Flow defined a new way to perform freestyle kendama and to judge such style. Players from around the world apply to participate by listing their achievements. The top approx. 60 players are selected to perform for 90 seconds one by one. Judges determine 16 finalists who will go head to head with 2 x 45 seconds for each player in one-on-one battle towards the final.

C&F Winners
Year	Winner	2nd Place	3rd Place
2025	(Japan) Yasuhito Chiba	(Romania) Adrian Vilau	(Japan) Ryoga Kawamoto
2024	N/A	N/A	N/A
2023	(Japan) Yasuhito Chiba	(Japan) Shinnosuke Togo	(Italy) Davide Leonardi
2022	(Japan) Shinnosuke Togo	(Japan) Yasuhito Chiba	(Japan) Hiroto Motohashi
2021	(Japan) Yasuhito Chiba	(Japan) Nobuyoshi Norioka	(Japan) Soma Fujita
2020	(Japan) Takuya Igarashi	(Japan) Soma Fujita	(Japan) Yasuhito Chiba
2019	(Japan) Kaito Nakajima	(Japan) Yasuhito Chiba	(Japan) Kengo Kawamura
2018	(United States) Bonz Atron	(United States) Nick Gallagher	(Japan) Misumi Nakao
2017	(United States) Bonz Atron	(Japan) So Kanada	(United States) Nick Gallagher
2016	(United States) Jake Fischer	(United States) Wyatt Bray	(United States) Bonz Atron
2015	(United States) Bonz Atron	(United States) Nic Stodd	(Japan) Taku Hatanaka
2014	(Denmark) Thorkild May	(Japan) Taiga Ogawa	(United States) Kris Bosch

==== North American Kendama Open ====
Formerly known as the Minnesota Kendama Open, the North American Kendama Open (NAKO) has been an annual kendama event in Minnesota every Fall since 2013. The NAKO has developed in length over the years, going from a one-day event in 2013–2014, to a two-day event in 2015–2017, to a three-day event in 2018–2019. The event has been hosted all over Minnesota; in 2013 it was held in Saint Paul, in the years 2014–2018 it was held in the Mall of America in Bloomington, and in 2019 it was hosted in Minneapolis at the Varsity Theater.

The forms of competition that the NAKO offers are:

- Beginner speed ladder
- Intermediate speed ladder
- Amateur open division
- Pro Open Division
- Freestyle

Each style of competition is split up into different times across each day of the event, so a portion of every competition is completed by the time each day ends. On the final day, a champion is crowned in all divisions.

==== European Kendama Championship ====
EKC is the biggest kendama event in Europe and one of the largest worldwide with 700+ attendees in 2025 and thousands more watching online. It was the first event outside of the USA streamed by Sweets Kendamas on Twitch. The event is currently held in Leiden (Netherlands). The EKC's main event is the Freestyle, only recently hosting an Open division (2022). It has the reputation of being the world's most exciting kendama event, looking more like a hip-hop concert than a conventional kendama competition. Nowadays the EKC is hosted by Grain Theory pro Teodore Fiorina. The event is the only one of this size to be run by an individual, and not a company.

==== Battle at the Border ====
The Battle at the Border is the longest-standing annual kendama competition in the United States. The event is currently hosted by Kentucky-based kendama company Sol Kendamas. The event occurs on the first weekend of January in Tennessee, USA.

In June 2011, the first public Kendama competition (battle) was held in the state of Tennessee. The event occurred in the city of Nashville hosted by a kendama blog called the "Kensession Stand". The event was called the "Nashville Kendama Battle", and was held at 12th South Taproom. In subsequent years, a group of kendama players called The Kendama Squad (Chad Covington, Nicholas Bellamy, and John Ross Rudolph)—alongside the Kensession Stand (Tyler Marshall)—hosted annual kendama battles in Clarksville, Tennessee. While the competition continued to occur annually, the name "Battle at the Border" was not implemented until the 2014 competition. In 2015, Sol Kendamas began officially coordinating the event. In 2015, the competition reached its largest attendance (approximately 150 people). Battle at the Border (2015-2016) was held in Nashville, Tennessee on the first weekend of January at Rocketown. Battle at the Border (2017–2018) was held on the first weekend of January at The Foundry in Nashville, TN. Battle at the Border returned to Rocketown and has continued to be hosted there since.

Kendama Major Champions by Year
Year	BATB		EKC		NAKO	
Year	Open	Freestyle	Open	Freestyle	Open	Freestyle
2026	(Japan) Yasuhito Chiba	(Japan) Ryoga Kawamoto	(Japan) Ryoga Kawamoto	(Japan) Ryoga Kawamoto	(United States) Jacob Schultz	(Japan) Nowa Yamada
2025	(Japan) Ryoga Kawamoto	(Japan) Yasuhito Chiba	(Japan) Ryoga Kawamoto	(Japan) Yasuhito Chiba	(Japan) Nonoka Kyodo	(Japan) Nonoka Kyodo
2024	(United States) Alex Mitchell	(Japan) Nonoka Kyodo	(Romania) Adrian Vilau	(Japan) Takuya Igarashi	(Japan) Ryoga Kawamoto	(Japan) Kaito Nakajima
2023	(United States) Zack Gallagher	(United States) Alex Mitchell	(Japan) Nobuyoshi Norioka	(Japan) Yasuhito Chiba	(United States) Edwin Tickner	(United States) Nick Gallagher
2022	(United States) Liam Rauter	(France) Teodore Fiorina	(United States) Kelvin Wong	(United States) Alex Mitchell	(United States) Nick Gallagher	(United States) Wyatt Bray
2021	(United States) Liam Rauter	This division did not happen that year	EKC did not happen that year		(Japan) So Kanada	(Japan) Misumi Nakao
2020	(United States) Alex Mitchell	(United States) Logan Tosta	EKC did not happen that year		(United States) Nick Gallagher	(Finland) Albert Kirvesmaki
2019	(United States) Liam Rauter	(United States) Liam Rauter / (United States) Alex Mitchell	Open division did not take place at EKC this year	(United States) Wyatt Bray	(Japan) Hiroto Motohashi	(United States) Nick Gallagher
2018	(United States) Bonz Atron	(United States) Lukas Funk	(United States) Bonz Atron / Nick Gallagher (KWC Style)	(United States) Nick Gallagher	(Japan) So Kanada	(United States) Bryson Lee
2017	(United States) Liam Rauter	(United States) Jake Fischer	(Denmark) Rolf Sandvigganer	(Denmark) Rolf Sandvigganer	(Japan) So Kanada	(United States) Nick Gallagher
2016	(United States) Kevin DeSoto	(United States) Jake Fischer	(United Kingdom) Rob Henman	(United States) Bonz Atron	(United States) Nick Gallagher	(United States) Bonz Atron
2015	(United States) William Penniman	Freestyle did not take place at BATB in this period	(United Kingdom) Rob Henman	(United Kingdom) Rob Henman	(United States) Zack Gallagher	(United States) Jake Fischer
2014	(United States) Jake Fischer	Freestyle did not take place at BATB in this period	(Japan) Katsuaki Schimadera	(Japan) Hiroki Ijima	(United States) Lukas Funk	(United States) Matthew Ballard
2013	(United States) William Penniman	Freestyle did not take place at BATB in this period	(Japan) Tomoya Mukai	(United States) Christian Fraser	(United States) Max Norcross	Freestyle did not take place at NAKO in this period
2012	(United States) Christian Fraser	Freestyle did not take place at BATB in this period	(Japan) Tomoya Mukai	Freestyle did not take place at EKC in this period	Nako started from 2013	

=== Major Competitions Champions ===
Table of Major Competitions Champions
Player	KWC Style Wins	Open Wins	Freestyle Wins	Total wins
(Japan) Yasuhito Chiba	2	1	6	9
(United States) Nick Gallagher	2	3	4	9
(United States) Bonz Atron	1	2	5	8
(Japan) Ryoga Kawamoto	2	4	2	8
(Japan) Takuya Igarashi	3	0	2	5
(United States) Liam Rauter	0	4	1	5
(United States) Jake Fischer	0	1	4	5
(United States) Alex Mitchell	0	2	3	5
(Japan) So Kanada	1	3	0	4
(United States) Wyatt Bray	1	0	2	3
(United Kingdom) Rob Henman	0	2	1	3
(Japan) Nonoka Kyodo	0	1	2	3
(United States) Bryson Lee	1	0	1	2
(United States) William Penniman	0	2	0	2
(United States) Christian Fraser	0	1	1	2
(United States) Lukas Funk	0	1	1	2
(United States) Zack Gallagher	0	2	0	2
(Japan) Tomoya Mukai	0	2	0	2
(Japan) Kaito Nakajima	0	0	2	2
(Denmark) Rolf	0	1	1	2
(Japan) Rui Sora	1	0	0	1
(United States) Kevin DeSoto	0	1	0	1
(Japan) Katsuaki Schimadera	0	1	0	1
(United States) Logan Tosta	0	0	1	1
(France) Teodore Fiorina	0	0	1	1
(United States) Kelvin Wong	0	1	0	1
(Japan) Hiroto Motohashi	0	1	0	1
(United States) Edwin Tickner	0	1	0	1
(United States) Max Norcross	0	1	0	1
(Japan) Nobuyoshi Norioka	0	1	0	1
(United States) Jacob Schultz	0	1	0	1
(Romania) Adrian Vilau	0	1	0	1
(United States) Matthew Ballard	0	0	1	1
(Japan) Hiroki Ijima	0	0	1	1
(Finland) Albert Kirvesmaki	0	0	1	1
(Denmark) Thorkild May	0	0	1	1
(Japan) Misumi Nakao	0	0	1	1
(Japan) Shinnosuke Togo	0	0	1	1
(Japan) Nowa Yamada	0	0	1	1

== See also ==
- Cup-and-ball
- Juggling
- Yo-yo
- Poi
- Diabolo
