= List of skill toys =

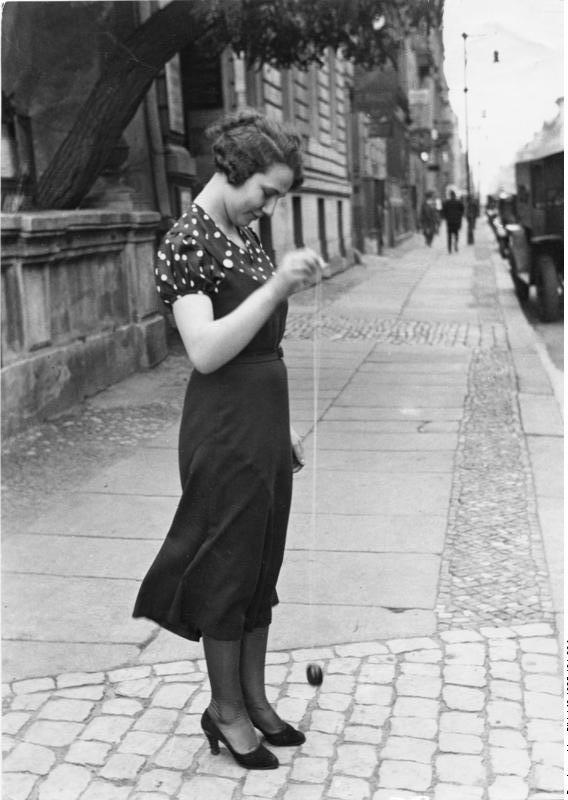
The yo-yo is an example of a skill toy.

A skill toy is an object or theatrical prop used for dexterity play or an object manipulation performance. A skill toy can be any static or inanimate object with which a person dances, manipulates, spins, tosses, or simply plays. Most skill toys are played alone, although some can be played with multiple people (such as footbag, juggling, and jump rope).

== Examples ==
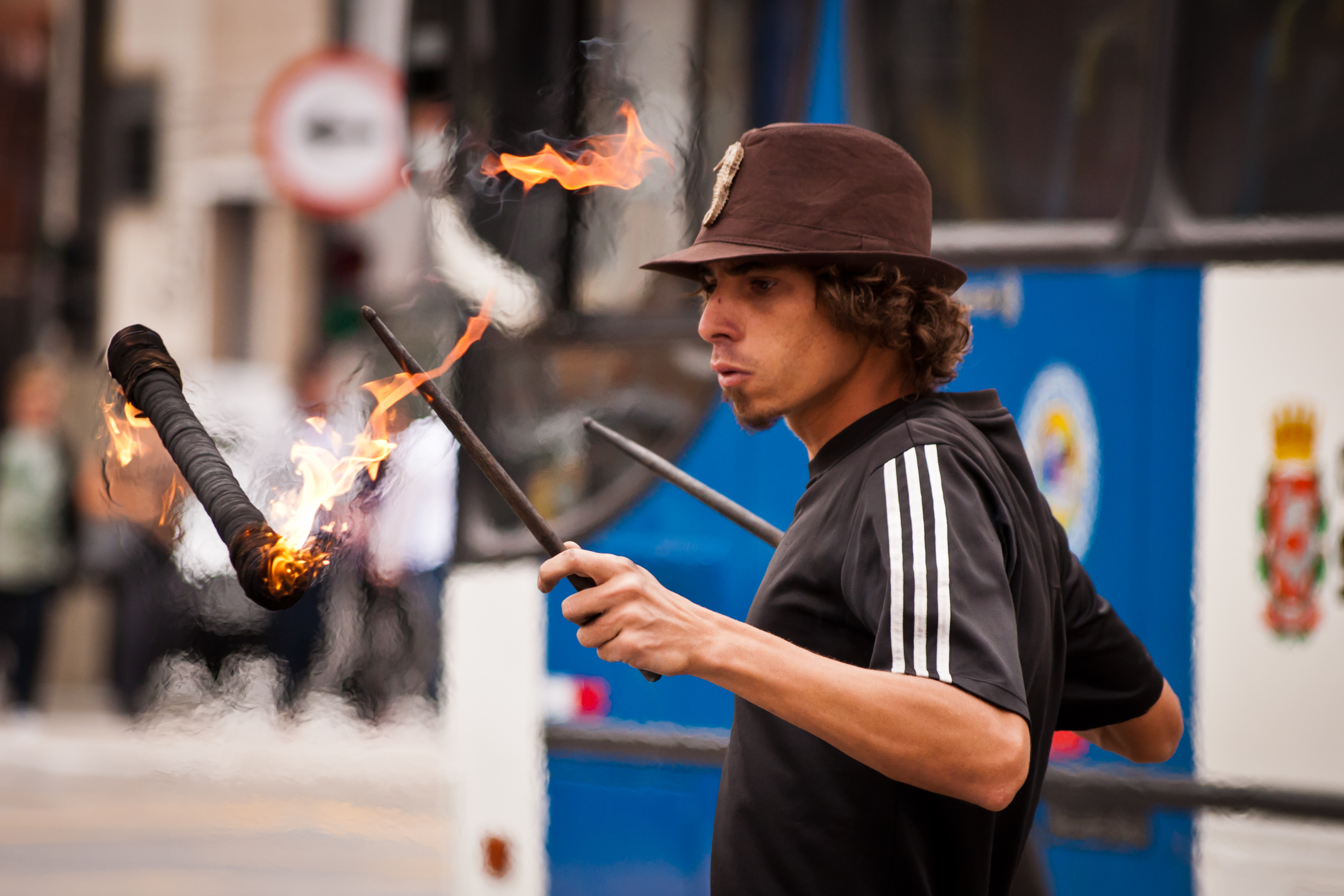
A performer using devil sticks

Common examples of skill toys include:

- Alaska yo-yo
- Astrojax
- Balance boards
- Ball-in-a-maze puzzle and its variants:
  - Labyrinth (marble game)
  - Perplexus
  - Rubik's 360
- Balls, when used e.g. for juggling or in rhythmic gymnastics
- Baton
- Begleri
- Beigoma
- Boomerang
- Butterfly knife
- Buugeng
- Cards, when used for cardistry or card throwing
- Cat's cradle
- Chatter ring
- Clackers
- Claw crane
- Coins, when used for coin manipulation
- Cup-and-ball and ring-and-pin
- Devil sticks
- Diabolo
- Dice, when used for dice stacking
- Fingerboard
- Hats, when used for hat manipulation
- Hocker, as in stool tricking or sporthocker
- Hoops, when used for hoop rolling or hula hoop
- Chinese jump rope
- Skip-It
- Footbag
- Hand sack
- Jokari and related games:
  - Speed-ball
  - Tetherball
  - Totem tennis
- Knuckle roller
- Knucklebones
- Marble
- Milk caps (pogs)
- Monkey Knuckles
- Paddleballs (bolo bat)
- Pens, when used for pen spinning
- Pinball
- Pogo stick
- Lolo ball
- Poi
- Kendama
- Ring toss
- Rubik's cube
- Rubik's Magic
- Swing Wing
- Skateboard
- Slinky
- Tops and other spinners
- Yo-yos
- Zippo lighters, when used for manipulation

== Juggling props ==
Juggling prop, most often a juggling ball or beanbag, may also refer to:

- Aerial hoop
- Aerial silk
- Chair acrobatics
- Cigar box
- Contact juggling
- Cyr wheel
- Dapo Star
- Flair bartending
  - Teh tarik (Pulled Tea)
- Juggling club
  - Indian club
  - Clubs (rhythmic gymnastics)
- Juggling ring
- Bouncing ball
- Knife juggling
- Logrolling (sport)
- Risley (circus act)
- Rolling globe
- Torch
- Sign Twirling
- Ball juggling
- Plate spinning
- Stilt walking
- Wheel gymnastics
- Staff/Staves (contact, thrown or spun)
- Poi (2 or 3, contact, thrown or spun)
- Rope Dart
- Sword Spinning (contact or traditional)
- Kendama (increasingly associated with juggling culture)
- Yo-yo
- Diabolo (Chinese Yo-yo)
- Fire Fans
- Shaker cups

== See also ==
- List of toys
- Children's toys and games
- Outline of games
- List of children's games
- Paper-and-pencil game
- Street game
