= Object manipulation =

Dexterity play or performance

Object manipulation is a form of dexterity play or performance in which one or more people physically interact with one or more objects. Many object manipulation skills are recognised as circus skills. Props used for object manipulation include balls, clubs, hoops, poi, and staffs. Other object manipulation skills are linked to sport, magic, and everyday objects or practices. Magic props include cards and coins, while sporting objects include nunchaku and footballs. Object manipulation with ordinary items may be considered to be object manipulation when the object is used in an unusually stylized or skillful way (such as in flair bartending) or for a physical interaction outside of its socially acknowledged context or differently from its original purpose.

Object manipulators may also be practitioners of fire performance, which is essentially object manipulation where specially designed props are soaked in fuel and lit on fire.

== Types ==
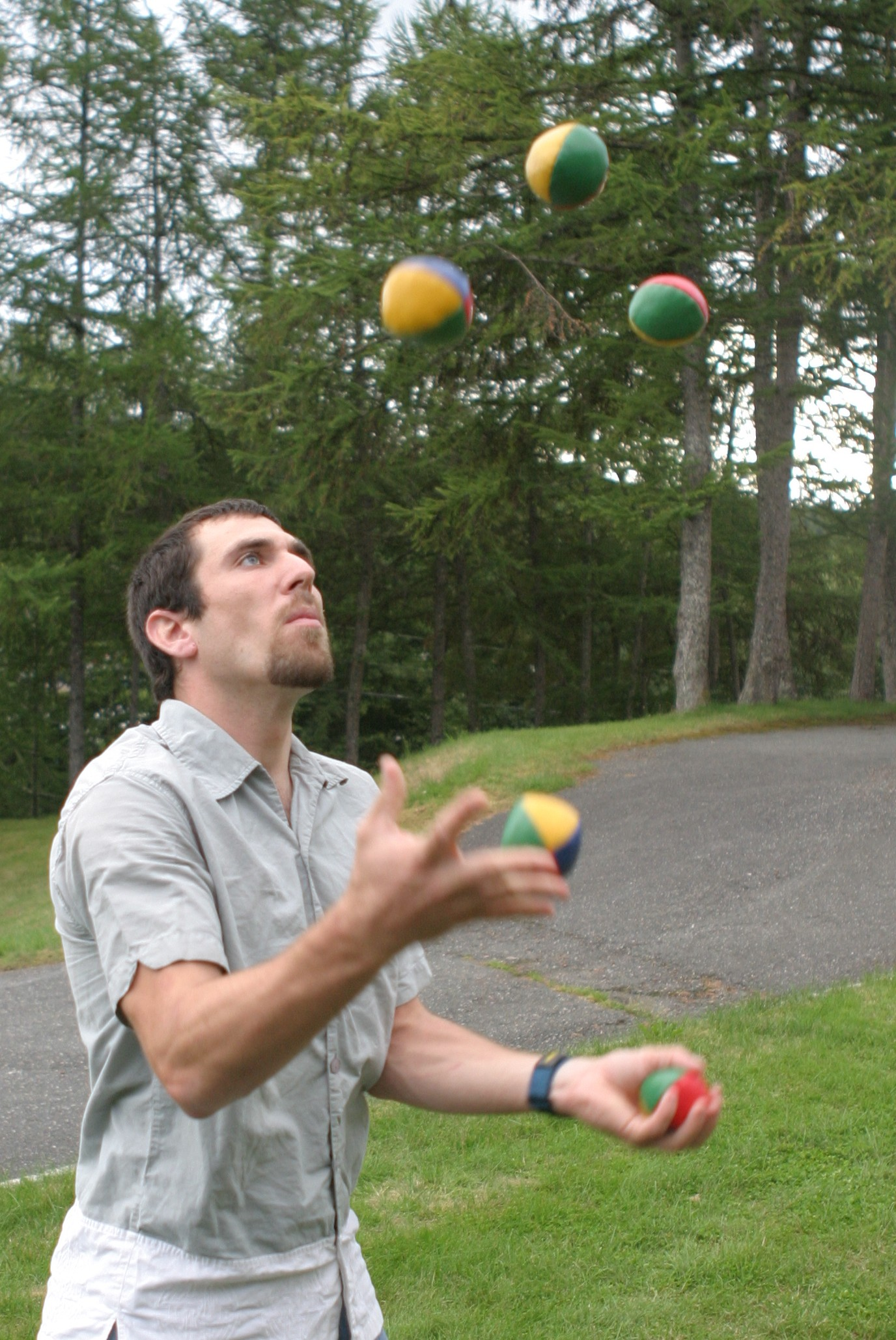
A man juggling five balls

There is a very wide range of types of object manipulation. Each type of object manipulation has often been grouped into a category of object manipulation skills. These categories are shown below. However many types of object manipulation do not fit these common categories while others can be seen to belong to more than one category.

=== Juggling and tossing ===
Juggling is a physical skill involving the manipulation of objects for recreation, entertainment or sport. The most recognizable form of juggling is toss juggling. Juggling can be the manipulation of one object or many objects at the same time, using one or many hands. Jugglers often refer to the objects they juggle as props. The most common props are balls, clubs, or rings. Some jugglers use more dramatic objects such as knives, fire torches or chainsaws. The term juggling can also commonly refer to other prop-based manipulation skills such as diabolo, devil sticks, poi, cigar boxes, shaker cups, contact juggling, hooping, and hat manipulation.

- Juggling
  - Contact juggling
  - Toss juggling
- Chinlone
- Cigar box (juggling)
- Devil Sticks
- Diabolo
- Flair bartending
- Footbag
- Hat manipulation

=== Spinning and twirling ===
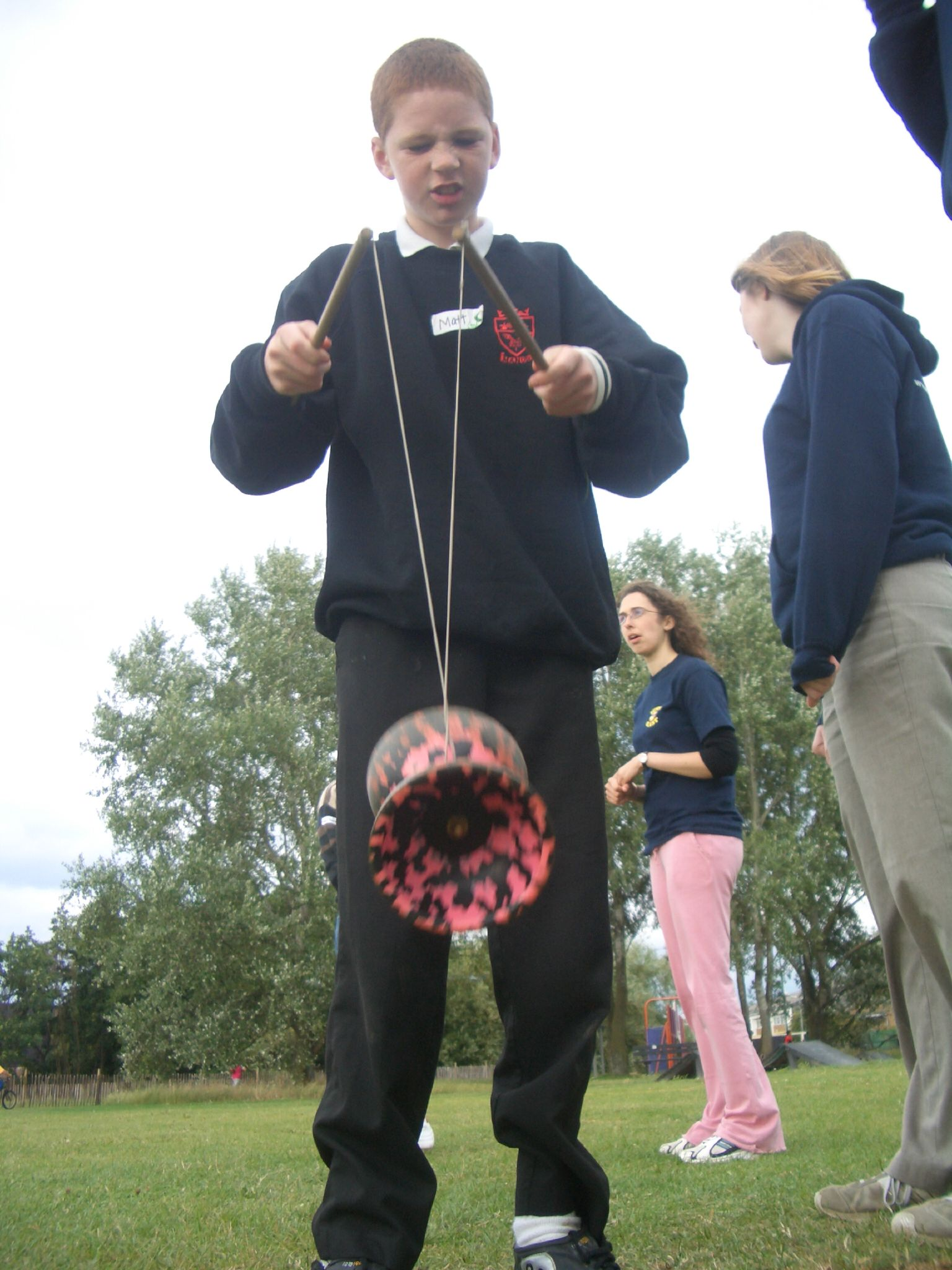
A boy with a diabolo

Spinning and twirling are any of several activities performing spinning, twirling or rotating the spun object for exercise, play or performance. The object twirling can be done directly by one or two hands, the fingers or by other parts of the body. It can also be done indirectly, as in the case of devil or flower sticks, using another object or objects. The origin of twirling can be found in manipulation skills developed for armed combat and in traditional dance. The various twirling skills have become increasingly popular with many associated with circus skills.

- Chinese yo-yo
- Club swinging
- Devil sticks
- Diabolo
- Eskimo yo-yo
- Fanning
- Fire staff
- Flagging
- Freestyle nunchaku
- Glowsticking
- Hooping
  - Hula hooping
- Padiddling
- Plate spinning
- Poi spinning
- Rhythmic gymnastics
- Rope dart
- Trick roping
- Twirling
  - Baton twirling
  - Color guard and winter guard
- Yo-yo

=== Skill toys ===
A combination of pen spinning tricks.

Skill toys are purpose-made objects that require manipulative skill for their typical use. Also often used as fidget toys, examples of such toys are:

- Astrojax
- Begleri
- Kendama
- Pen spinning
- Butterfly knife (Balisong)
- Knucklebones
- Fingerboard (skateboard)

=== Dexterity ===
Dexterity skills are seen here as skills that are not usually associated with other categories of object manipulation. Many of these skills use items not usually associated with object manipulation. Examples are dice, cups, and lighters.

- Cardistry
- Card manipulation
- Clackers
- Coin manipulation
- Dice stacking
- Isolation
- Knife throwing
- Shuffling
- Sport stacking, a.k.a. cup stacking
- Whipcracking

== See also ==
- Burning Man, an annual event that attracts object manipulators
- Chinese jump rope
- Modern juggling culture
