= Havana Club International Cocktail Grand Prix =

Bartending competition Havana Club International Cocktail Grand Prix

The Havana Club International Cocktail Grand Prix it is an international bartending competition that began in 1996. Since then the competition has taken place every two years in Havana, Cuba. The Grand Prix is organized by Havana Club, with the support of the Cuban Cantineros Club. The International Bartenders Association (IBA) is an associated sponsor of the competition.

The Havana Club International Cocktail Grand Prix is truly an international competition, drawing in top talent from over 30 different countries. After pre-qualifying in national competitions, the finalists gather in Havana for the final stage of the competition.

== Winners ==
Year	Name	Country	Category
1996	Juan Tito Calcina Santander	Bolivia	Classic
1998	Clemente Ortiz	Mexico	Classic
2000	Manuel Carbajo	Cuba	Classic
2000	Chuck McIntosh	Canada	Flair-tending
2002	Ihosvany Machado Gomez	Cuba	Classic
2002	Sasha Yvankovich	Italy	Flair-tending
2004	Juan Carlos Valladares	Cuba	Classic
2004	Seyran Gevorkyan	Russia	Flair-tending
2006	Gianalberto Alessandrini	Italy	Classic
2006	Danilo Oribe	Uruguay	Flair-tending
2008	Tito Mueller	Germany	Classic
2010	Marcis Dzelzainis	United Kingdom	N/A
2012	Julien Escot	France	N/A
2014	Andrew Loudon	United Kingdom	N/A
2016	Amaury Cepeda	Cuba	N/A
2018	Ninon Fauvarque	France	N/A
2024	Andreas Giaprakas, Panos Minoudis	Greece	N/A

== Rules ==
In the 8th International Cocktail Grand Prix in May 2010, bartenders were judged on the following criteria- their knowledge, their mixing techniques, the quality of their drinks, and their overall image.

Competitors are permitted to bring their own barware, tools, and ingredients. Each competitor has 10 minutes to prepare three original cocktails. The first cocktail must use Havana Club rum as its base and the second must use Havana Añejo 7 Años. The third cocktail must be a reinvention of a classic Cuban rum cocktail. While preparing their drinks the participants must be able to hold a conversation and multi-task.

The bartenders are judged out of 250 points: 150 points for the three cocktails based on the appearance, aroma, taste, finish and balance of the drink, and another possible 100 points for the technical skill, knowledge, innovative thinking, creativity, communication skills and overall image of the bartender. The final four competitors have 15 minutes to prepare the same three drinks, plus an additional drink that will test their creativity using secret ingredients given to them at the last minute.
