= Poi definitions =

Poi tricks are defined by the manipulation and combination of several variables of the spinning activity. These variables typically include, but are not limited to, the following:

- The direction of the poi spinning
- The timing of the poi spin
- The position of the hands
- The spinner's bodily orientation
- The poi's center of gravity
- The poi's respective plane(s)
- The poi and/or hands in relation to the Unit Circle and Axes

Often tricks require manual dexterity, coordination, and fine timing to accomplish. More skilled spinners may be able to combine or link these mechanics into more complex tricks.

== Timing and direction ==
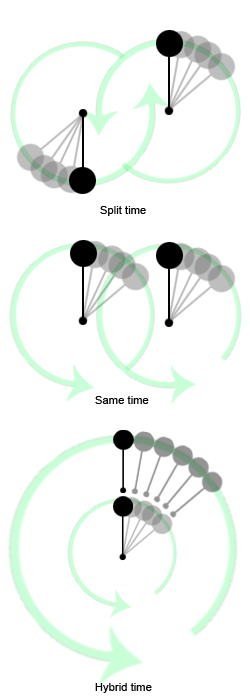
Fig.1-Poi Timings

Timing and direction is a concept used by poi spinners to refer to how the props and hands move in relation to each other. There are currently four major categories of timing and direction that prop movements commonly fall into. These categories are:

Together Time, Same Direction (also referred to as Same Time and abbreviated TS ): Props are spinning in the same direction and in phase with each other so that a doubling effect occurs in the audience's perception of the resulting trick.

Together Time, Opposite Direction (also referred to as Opposites and abbreviated TO): Props are spinning in opposite directions and in phase with each other so that the trick they produce appears to reflect across a vertical line of symmetry.

Split Time, Same Direction (also referred to as Split Time and abbreviated SS): Props are spinning in the same direction and 180 degrees out of phase with each other so that the trick they produce appears to reflect along a line of symmetry that rotates from the center of the trick.

Split Time, Opposite Direction (abbreviated SO): Props are spinning in opposite directions and 180 degrees out of phase with each other so that the trick they produce appears to reflect across a horizontal line of symmetry.

== Planes ==
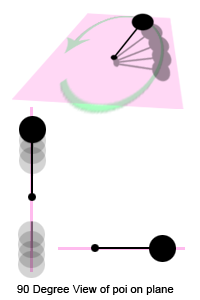
Fig.2-Planes

Planes in poi spinning refer to the plane that is created from the poi's center of gravity to all points along the path of the poi head and are defined by the spinner's orientation.

=== Plane positioning ===
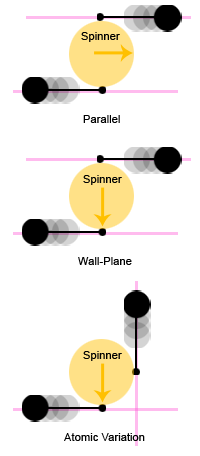
Fig.3-Planes

Parallel – also known as "spinning on tracks", are vertical planes that are positioned on either side of the poi spinner. In these scenarios, the poi spinner's heading and the poi's planes are parallel.

Wall-planes – are vertical planes that are positioned 90 degrees from the poi-spinner's heading. In this arrangement, the poi can be either in front of or behind the poi spinner.

Reels – refer to any number of wall-plane oriented tricks in which the planes move from in front to behind the poi-spinner in an alternating fashion.

Atomic – refers to any number of tricks in which the planes of either poi intersect the plane of the other. This term may be derived from the paths of the poi heads imitating the orbits of electrons around a nucleus of an atom.

== Directionality ==
Poi heads typically move in one of 4 directions in relation to the spinner.

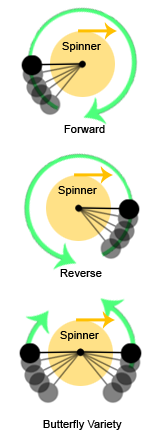
Fig 4.-Forward, Reverse, and Butterfly

Forward – refers to poi spinning in parallel planes where the head appears to move in the same direction that the spinner faces; the poi head moves away from the spinner.

Backward – refers to poi spinning in parallel planes where the head appears to move in the opposite direction that the spinner faces; the poi head moves toward the spinner.

Right-to-Left/Left-to-Right – in a wall-plane scenario, the poi move in either clockwise or counter-clockwise fashion in relation to the spinner. It is noted that RTL and LTR orientation is dependent on the spinner's heading.

Butterfly – also known as "opposites", refers to any number of tricks in which the poi move in opposite directions. For example, while spinning in parallel, one poi head would be moving forward while the other in reverse. While in a wall plane, one head would be moving clockwise, the other counter-clockwise. Poi spinning in the same-time and same position are considered the traditional "butterfly" as when viewed from the front, the poi appear to meet at the top and bottom of the spin thus simulating the flapping of butterfly wings.

=== Direction changes ===
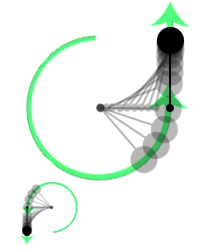
Fig 5.-Poi stall along vertical tangent.

Moves such as stalls and wraps can change direction of one poi or both poi.

Stall – refers to a change in the center of gravity of the poi along a radius of the unit-circle thus allowing the poi head to travel in a tangential manner from the Unit Circle in such a way as to cause the poi to stop in its path. The intended effect is that the hand would stop the poi traveling on the unit-circle's tangent and thus canceling its centripetal motion.

Wrap (recoil) – refers to a direction change caused the poi wrapping around something, typically a part of the body, in such a way that the poi-head bounces off of the target and the subsequent action results in the head spinning in an opposite direction.

== Hand/poi positions ==
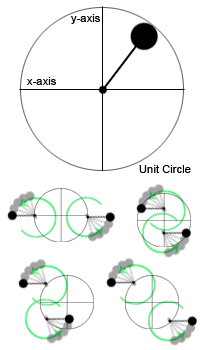
Fig.6- The Unit Circle of Poi Spinning and Hand Positions.

Hand positioning defines an entire range of tricks in spinning poi in which the hands are placed in or move between different positions in relation to the spinner's body, and are often defined by the Unit Circle and the spinner's axes. In a traditional sense, the hand position is often synonymous with the poi's center of gravity.

Unit Circle – is defined by the diameter of the circle made by spinning the poi with a fixed center of gravity.

Axes – refer to the lines that intersect the Unit Circle every 90 degrees; typically, the axes define horizontal and vertical movements of both the hands and the poi.

=== Basic terminology ===
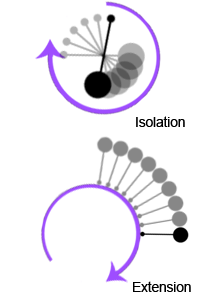
Fig.7- Isolation and Extension

Isolation – or "isolated" refer to any number of tricks in which the hands follow the poi head thus changing the center of rotation from the end of the poi to the center of the string.

Extension – also known as "long-arm", refers to a specific type of hybrid-timing where the poi-head and the spinner's hand share the same directionality in a manner such that they form two concentric circles. This type of move involves the spinner's arm being fully extended as the hand follows the unit circle.

Flowers – also known as "compound circles", refers to any number of tricks where the poi heads rotate as the hands move along the unit circle thus creating smaller circles or "petals".

Snake – refers to any number of tricks in which the poi heads adopt a sinusoidal path as a result of the hands moving along or across the axes.

Pendulum – refers to any number of tricks in which the poi head(s) move along or across the axes.

Continuous Assembly Patterns (CAPs) – refer to a family of tricks in which the spinners hands move in an arc (semi-circular) pattern such that the poi head movements create smaller, closed loop and/or elliptical path.

=== Hand positioning vs. directionality ===
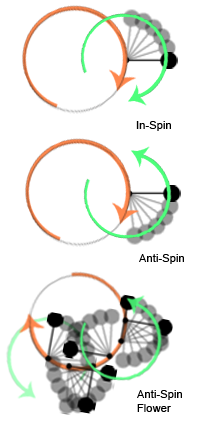
Fig.8-In-Spin and Anti-Spin Demonstration

In-Spin – refers to any number of flower tricks in which the hands move in the same direction of the poi spinning direction.

Anti-Spin – refers to any number of flower tricks in which the hands move in the opposite direction of the poi spinning direction.

=== Hand positioning vs. body placement ===
Behind-the-back(BTB) – refers to any number of spinning tricks or moves in which the planes are preserved while the spinner moves their hand(s) from one side of the body to the other by reaching around from behind.

Crosser – also known as a "straight jacket", refers to any number of spinning tricks or moves in which the planes are preserved while the spinner moves their hand(s) from one side of the body to the other by reaching around or across the front of their body in a bear-hug fashion.

Melt-down – refers to any number of tricks involving each hand moving from a crosser to a waist-wrap position in a continuously alternating fashion.

=== Buzz-saw ===
The buzzsaw refers to a class of tricks in which the poi planes are joined in such a way as they spin in a parallel fashion to the direct heading of the spinner. The path of the poi heads pass directly in front of the spinners' body in either forward or reverse direction.

=== Tracing ===
Tracing refers to a class of tricks in which the center of gravity of the poi move along the spinner's body or appendages.

== Specific tricks ==
=== Weaves ===
Weave – refers to any number of tricks that allow the spinner to keep the poi spinning in a continuous circular fashion while keeping the following:

- Split-time
- Center of gravity is on the end of the poi (at the hand location)
- Both hands are in the same position
- The poi are in the same plane regardless of parallel or wall-plane position

Weaves are typically denoted by the number of "beats".

Beat – a single rotation of the poi head. In terms of a weave, the number of rotations that the poi heads undergo before changing plane positions or making a full motion/position change cycle.

=== Fountain ===
Fountain refers to a class of tricks in which the poi change direction of spin in relation to the orientation of spinner. The fountain motion usually involves the spinner physically turning or changing hand positions such that the spin direction is maintained, but the spin direction is opposite in relation to the spinner's starting position.

Waist Wrap refers to a type of fountain, often performed in a wall plane fashion by which the spinner moves their hand from one side of the body to the other by either reaching around the front, spinning behind him or herself, or from behind the back, spinning in front of him or herself.

=== Thru-wraps ===
Thru-wrap – refer to a class of tricks in which the poi wrap with a body part or with each other in such a manner as to not change the direction of spin. This type of move often involves the center of gravity of the poi changing from the end to the center of the poi in an isolated fashion.

Air-wrap – also known as a tangle, refers to a through-wrap in which the poi are wrapped with each other thus changing their respective centers of gravity to the point of intersection, typically for one rotation.

Hyperloop – is a type of air-wrap such that the poi are wrapped in such a way as their centers of gravity are changed to the point of intersection and the motion of the poi head perpetuates the rotation of the other.

=== Triquetra ===
Triquetra is shorthand for three-petaled antispin flowers and is so named for the trick's resemblance to the Celtic symbol of the same name. It is frequently generalized to include any trick that includes the element of a three-petaled antispin flower.

=== Other ===
Dodging Daggers – refers to a type of reel by which the center of the poi's gravity passes between the spinner's legs.

Windmill – refers to a type of reel by which the poi's center of gravity passes above the spinner's head.

== Other variations ==
=== Contact poi ===
Contact poi is a class of poi spinning where one or both poi head(s) are released from the hand and manipulated with other parts of the body. These moves are generally derived from other prop-based/manipulative activities such as staff or contact juggling. Contact poi are often constructed in such a manner as to provide the handle with additional weight that serves as a counterbalance for the poi-head.

=== Meteor ===
A meteor is a poi-like manipulative whose ends, opposite the poi heads, are connected. See: meteor (juggling) and Eskimo yo-yo.
