= Torch (juggling) =

Prop used by jugglers

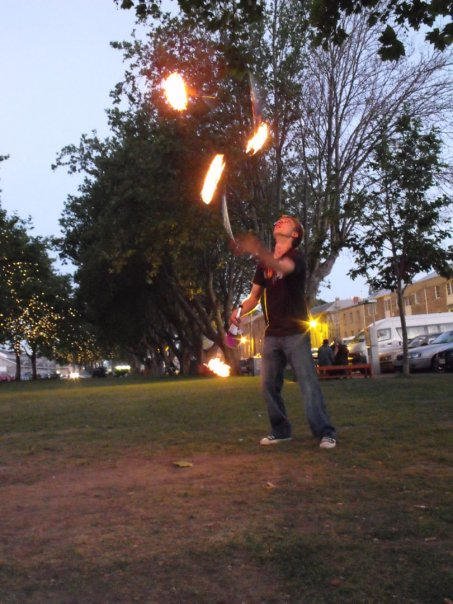
Torch juggling in Salamanca, Tasmania

Torch juggling in Hawaii, 2015

Juggling torches are one of various props used by jugglers. Torches are usually commercially made props that are made of wood and/or metal with a wick attached at one end. The wick is soaked in liquid fuel, usually paraffin (called kerosene in the US) and ignited before use.

== Wicks ==
The two most common wicks used with juggling torches are:

- Kevlar para-aramid
- Cotton

Both materials come in reels of material ranging from 13 mm to 180 mm wide and up to 100 m long. Around 40–80 cm of wick is wrapped onto each torch. In general, it is best to use hard limiting devices, such as nuts and bolts or kevlar thread, to hold the wick securely to itself and onto the shaft of the torch.

== Construction ==
The torch is usually constructed around a wooden dowel which runs the length of the torch from the knob (base) to the top. The lower 8–10 inch section is fitted with a handle, and is the section the juggler uses to catch and throw the torch. The handle can be covered in spiral wound plastic, cloth or leather. The middle of the torch is often larger in diameter than the handle and this section helps to balance the torch and makes it easier to juggle. The upper portion of the dowel is often covered in metal (usually aluminium) with the uppermost section covered in a wick. The wick is wrapped around the top of the shaft several times and secured with screws into the wooden core.

== Fuels ==
There are many choices for fuels, which differ in their specific properties. Performers working with fire props select a fuel based on a series of factors such as safety, availability, duration of performance and required flame temperature. Alcohol is generally not considered a good fuel for juggling torches. In the UK fire jugglers almost exclusively use paraffin (kerosene) or lamp oil - treated paraffin that emits less smoke.

== Balls ==
It is possible to buy flammable juggling balls. Gloves are often needed but not always; some juggling balls are designed so the flame sits a few centimetres above the hand in the centre of the ball. Ball juggling is easier than club juggling, and with juggling fire balls, performances often look impressive. However, juggling necessarily requires the hands to alternately grip the flaming balls for 1 or more 'juggling beats' (usually around 0.5 second), known as 'dwell time'. This restricts the size of flame and the duration of the burn to avoid overheating the hands, even with gloves. For these reasons, all commercially available fire juggling balls use a smaller wick and flame than standard juggling torches. Some enthusiasts have attempted to overcome this problem using fuel-soaked balls of kevlar rope and welding gloves or similar, but have been unable to achieve more than 30 seconds of useful juggling before the gloves catch fire.

== See also ==
- Fire performance
