= Anastasini Circus =

Italian entertainment company

- Native name: Circo Anastasini
- Company type: Private
- Industry: Entertainment
- Founded: 1877; 149 years ago
- Founder: Luigi Biasini; Girolamo Biasini; Sidonia; Antonia
- Headquarters: United States
- Area served: Worldwide
- Key people: Giovanni Anastasini (Circus Owner)
- Website: www.anastasini.com

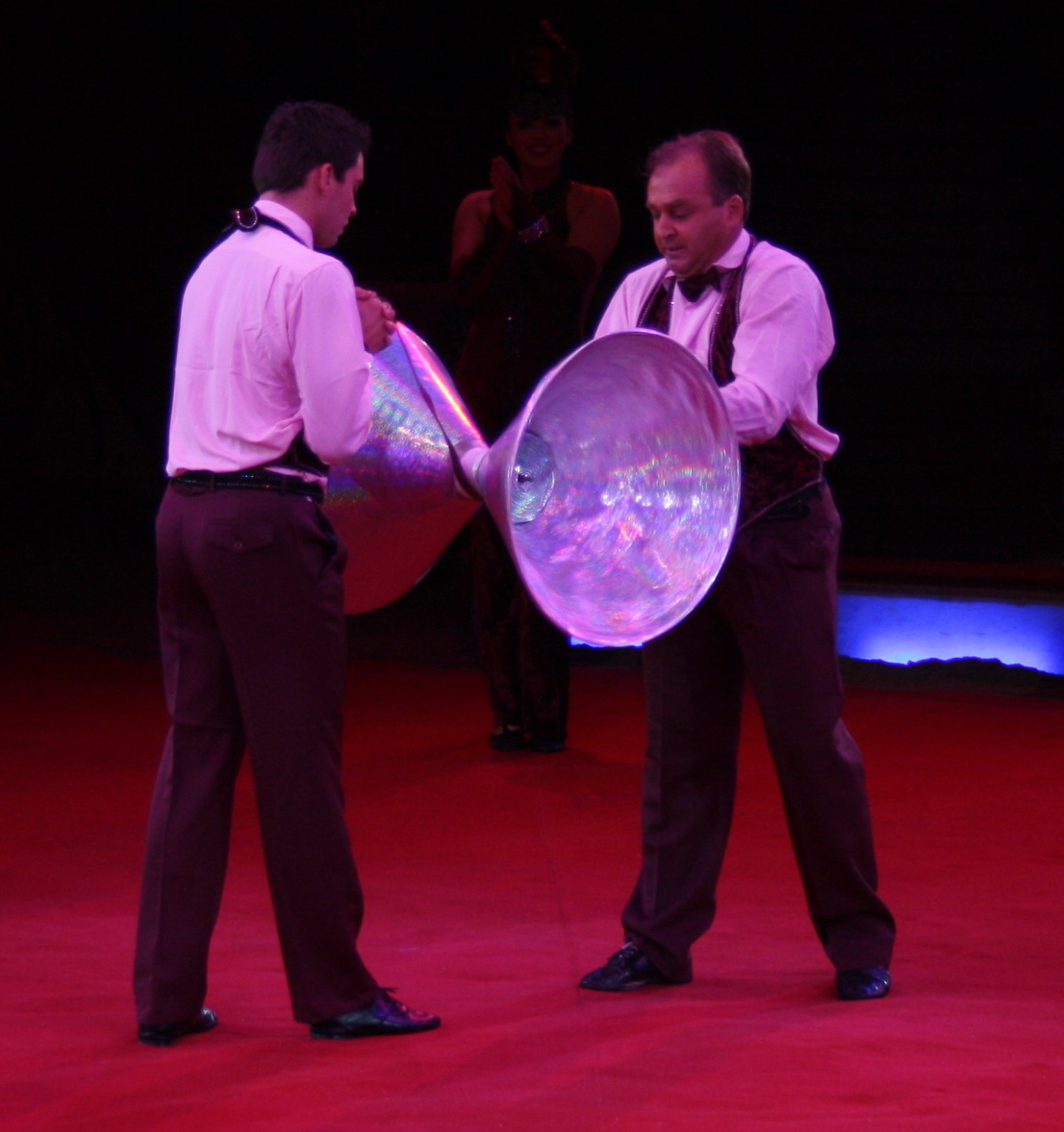
Performers with large diabolo

Anastasini Circus (Italian: Circo Anastasini) is an Italian entertainment company founded in 1877 by Lugi Biasini, Girolamo Biasini, Sidonia, and Antonia. It is currently one of the oldest circuses around. The circus moved to the United States in 1980 when Renato and his family went to perform with Circus Vargas, the country's largest traveling circus under canvas at that time.

The circus is currently in its 9th generation.

== Acts ==
- Pound Puppies – Luciano Anastasini and Gladis España
- Risley Act – Anastasini Brothers, Giuliano & Fabio Anastasini
- Aerial Rotating Cradle – Giovanni Anastasini & Irene España
- Anastasini Diabolos

== Anastasini Family Circus ==
- 1st Generation – Luigi Biasini, Girolamo Biasini, Sidonia, Antonia
- 2nd Generation –
- 3rd Generation –
- 4th Generation –
- 5th Generation – Giovanni Anastasini 1
- 6th Generation – Aristide Anastasini + wife Vittoria Teresa Anastasini born Griffa
- 7th Generation – Renato Anastasini with wife Betty Anastasini born Mariani, Orlanda Anastasini, Luciano Anastasini sen. with wife Käte Lotte Anastasini born Paulick
- 8th Generation – Giovanni Anastasini & Irene España, Luciano Anastasini & Gladis España
- 9th Generation – Giuliano Anastasini, Fabio Anastasini, Brando Anastasini, Adriano Anastasini, Chiara Anastasini
