= Monkey Knuckles =

Skill toy developed by Matthew Hiebert

Monkey Knuckles is a skill toy consisting of two sliding wooden balls on a string, with end stoppers that allow the player to grip the toy. The toy can be manipulated in a variety of ways to perform tricks, and depending on the way that the player grasps and manipulates the toy, different styles of play are possible.

Monkey Knuckles was developed by Matthew Hiebert, and was patented in 2006. In 2013 Hiebert licensed the design to Yomega Corporation, which took over its manufacturing and distribution.
