= Isolation (illusion) =

Illusion in which a prop appears to float in space

In contact juggling, poi spinning, hooping and other types of object manipulation, an isolation is an illusion whereby a prop appears to float in space, with the performer's hands and body moving around it. In reality, the performer is supporting the prop, and countering his or her movement relative to the prop.

Michael Moschen is originally credited for developing several of the techniques for ball isolations (as well as hoops and other props), and since his original performance of "Light" in the late 1980s, the idea has developed into a wide variety of techniques. One of the most important developments was the combination of crystal ball isolations and body-popping/locking/waving dance styles, as seen in the styles of, amongst others, Nik Robson and Matt Hennem in the '90s.
