= Buugeng =

Type of skill toy

Buugeng (from Japanese "Buu" meaning martial arts, and "Geng" meaning illusion) is a type of skill toy usually made of wood or plastic. Buugeng is a brand of S-shaped staffs created by Dai Zaobab. S-shaped staffs were a concept originally created by Michael Moschen in the 1990s. A single buugeng is an s-shape and is sometimes called an "S-staff". They are usually used in pairs to create patterns in motion by jugglers and performing artists.

A buuygeng juggling toy hanging in a shop In Brighton, UK

== Reference in literature ==
Melgar, M. (2017). El verano de nunca acabar. Spain: HarperCollins Ibérica S.A:

"El buugeng led, esas eses de luz que hipnotizaron a Chaplin, eran el último grito en malabares y se los habían regalado el resto de ChupiZancos por su cumpleaños. Seguro que habrían costado un pico, y que con ese gasto extra se habrían tenido que apretar aún más el cinturon en aquel minipiso que compartían con otros cuatro."

Translated to English:

"The buugeng led, those light esses that hypnotized Chaplin, were the latest in juggling and had been given to him by the rest of ChupiZancos for his birthday. I'm sure they would have cost a ton, and with that extra expense. Surely they would have cost a ton, and with that extra expense they would have had to tighten their belts even more in that mini-apartment they shared with four others."
