= Hat manipulation =

Form of juggling using a brimmed hat

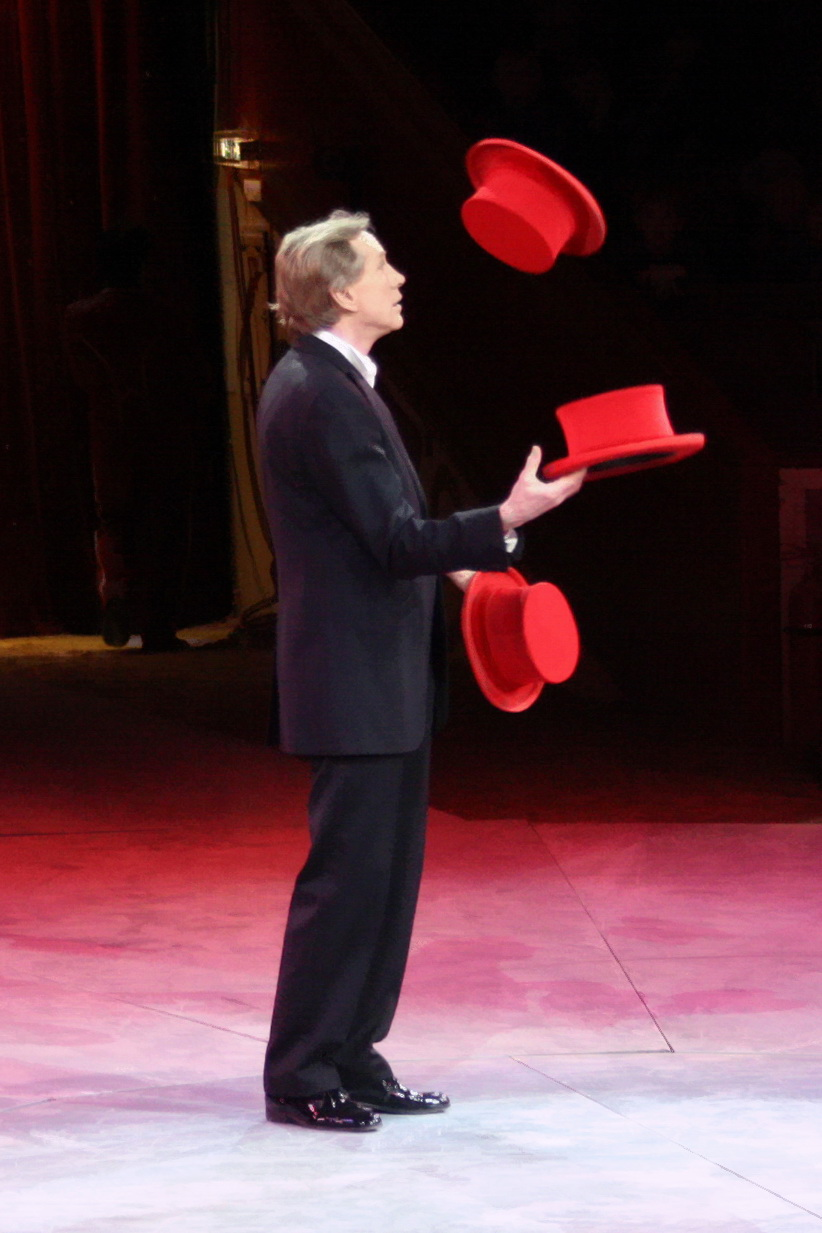
Juggling hats

Hat manipulation is a form of juggling in which the manipulator performs feats of skill and dexterity using a brimmed hat such as a bowler hat or a top hat as a prop. Tricks can range from rolling a hat up and down the various parts of the body to throwing and catching the hat in amusing ways. Hat manipulation is often comedic in nature. Part of the appeal of the art is in the necessary equipment; all that is needed is a good, heavy, brimmed hat, which can be found at many juggling stores. Famous manufacturers of manipulation specific hats are Nils Poll and Dubé. Hat manipulation is also frequently combined with traditional forms of juggling in order to create more varied acts.

Technically, hat manipulation is a form of object manipulation where the hat is the skill toy.

== Types of tricks ==
The types of tricks performed during hat manipulation fall into seven major categories. These are:

- Tumbles: Tricks where the hat rotates end over end (possibly over the body).
- Twiddles: Tricks in which a hat rotates quickly through the fingers.
- Spins: Tricks where the hat spins around its central axis, much like showing off with a basketball.
- Rolls: Tricks involving the hat spinning on its brim like a wheel.
- Throws: Tricks where a hat is thrown into the air.
- Comedy: Gags with the hat intended to make the audience laugh.
- Multi-hat juggling: Juggling 3 or more hats along the lines of normal juggling.

== See also ==
- List of circus skills
