= Padiddling =

Act of spinning an object on the pad of a finger

Padiddling is the act of spinning an object on the pad of a finger. This differs from most spinning tricks due to the active circling motions needed to keep an object spinning. The most common objects used by padiddlers are cafeteria style lunch trays and flying discs, but books, frying pans, magazines, pillows, and even laptop computers are also popular.

Padiddling was popularized during freestyle disk (frisbee) competitions in the 1970s until it fell out of favor in the early 1980s. The technique was used extensively in competitive events by John Dwork, Jason Salkey, Richie Smits, Joey Hudoklin, and Randy Silvey.

For a brief period of time there was a Padiddlers Association of the World. Notable members of PAW included John Anthony, Bill King, Peter Gellerman and Jim Brown.
