= Diabolo =

Spinning circus prop

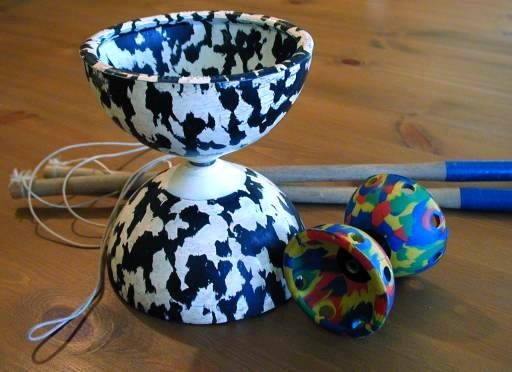
Large and miniature Western rubber diabolos. Wooden sticks are shown in the background.

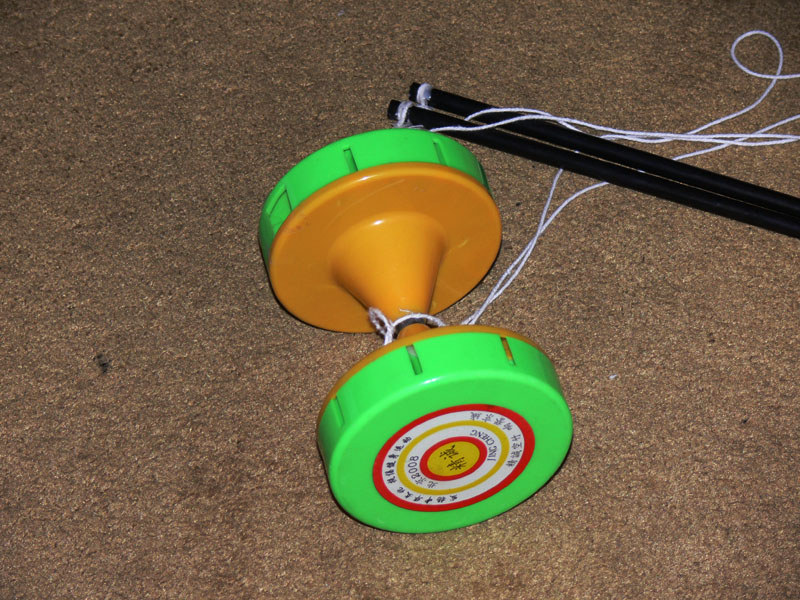
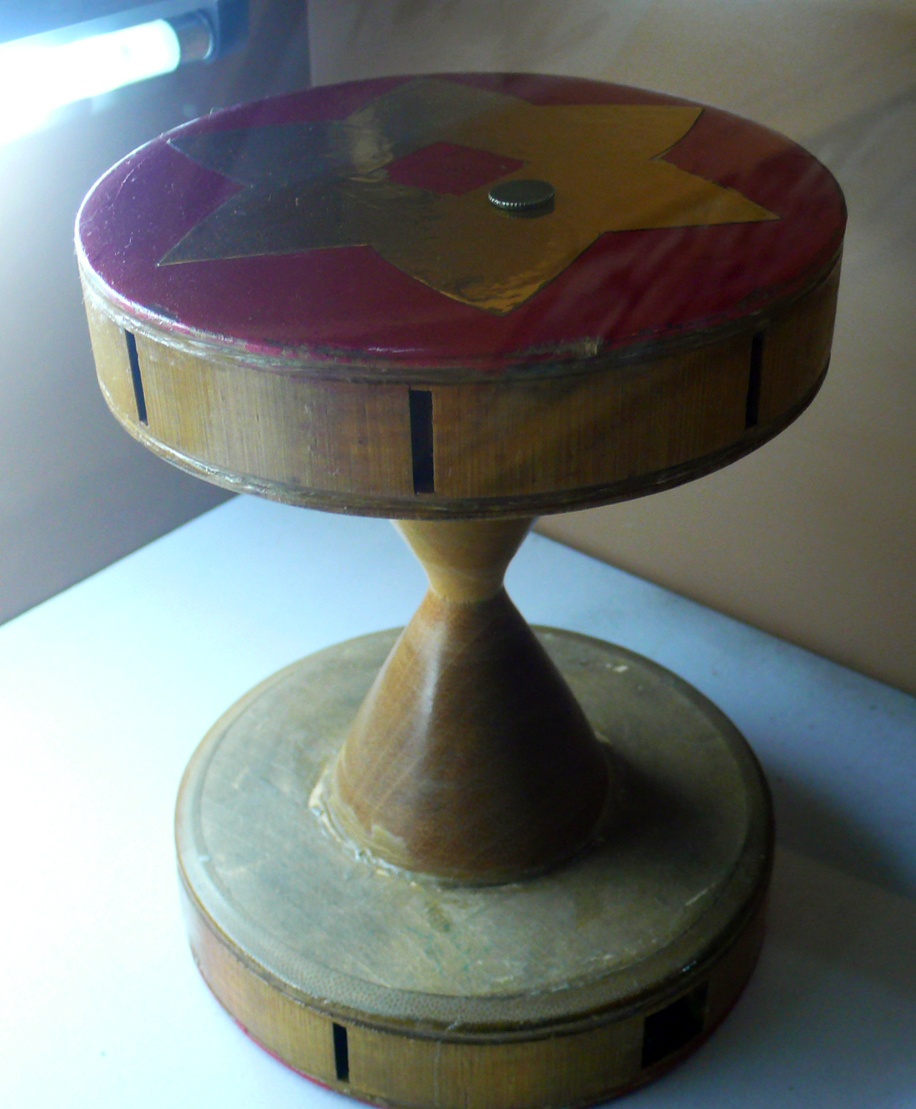
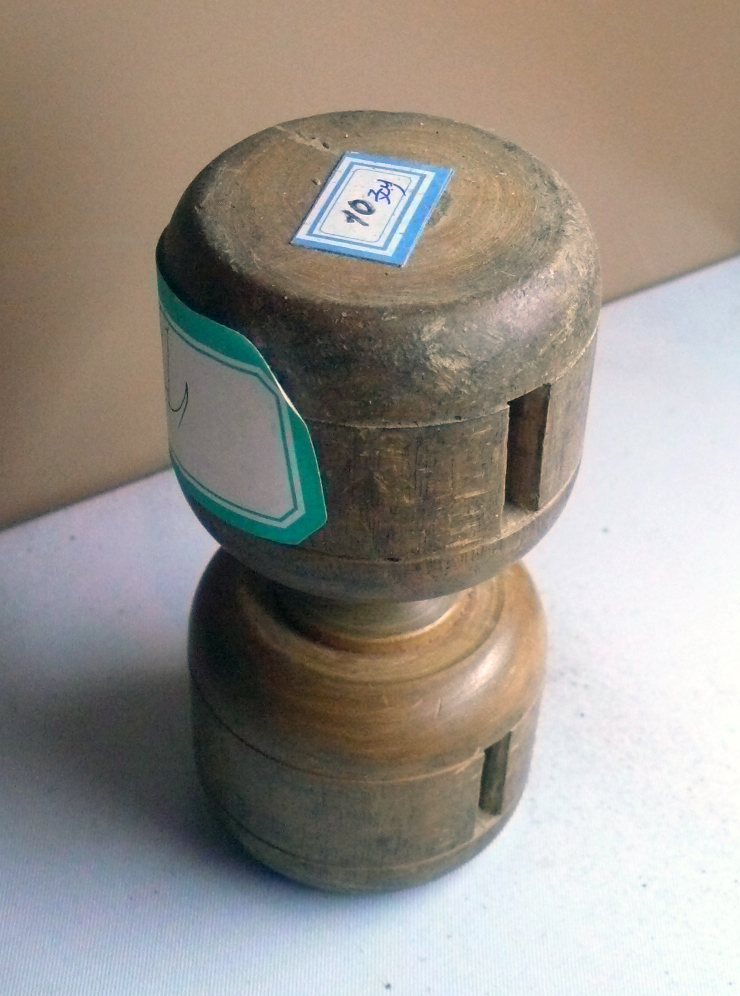
Chinese yo-yos old and new

The diabolo (/diːˈæbəloʊ/ dee-AB-ə-loh; commonly misspelled diablo) is a juggling or circus prop consisting of an axle (British English: bobbin) and two cups (hourglass/egg timer shaped) or discs derived from the Chinese yo-yo. This object is spun using a string attached to two hand sticks ("batons" or "wands"). A large variety of tricks are possible with the diabolo, including tosses, and various types of interaction with the sticks, string, and parts of the user's body. Multiple diabolos can be spun on a single string.

Like the Western yo-yo (which has an independent origin), it maintains its spinning motion through a rotating effect based on conservation of angular momentum.

== History ==
External videos
- Chinese diabolo player, 1929.

=== Origin ===
The Diabolo is derived from the Chinese yo-yo encountered by Europeans during the colonial era. However, the origin of the Chinese yo-yo is unknown. The earliest mention of the Chinese yo-yo is in the late Ming dynasty Wanli period (1572–1620), with its details well recorded in the book Dijing Jingwulue by the Liu Tong. The book refers to Chinese yo-yos as "kong zhong" (simplified Chinese: 空钟; traditional Chinese: 空鐘; pinyin: kōng zhong; lit. 'air bell').

Diabolos are made of different materials and come in different sizes and weights.

There are many names in the Chinese language for the Chinese yo-yo:

- simplified Chinese: 扯铃; traditional Chinese: 扯鈴; pinyin: chě líng; lit. 'pull bell sound'
- simplified Chinese: 响簧; traditional Chinese: 響簧; pinyin: xiǎng huáng; lit. 'sounds like a reed (instrument)'
- Chinese: （抖）空竹; pinyin: dǒu kōng zhú; lit. '(shaking) sky bamboo'
- simplified Chinese: 空钟; traditional Chinese: 空鐘; pinyin: kōngzhōng; lit. 'sky bell'

=== Spread to the West ===
The first known mention of a diabolo in the Western world was made by a missionary, Father Amiot, in Beijing in 1792 during Lord Macartney's ambassadorship, after which examples were brought to Europe, as was the sheng (eventually adapted to the harmonica and accordion). Amiot described it as follows:

It consists of two hollow cylinders of metal, wood, or bamboo, joined together in the middle by a cross-piece. Each of the cylinders is pierced by a hole in opposite directions. The rope loops around the crossbeam. By holding this rattle in the air, and moving it with speed, a rapid current of air is established in each of the portions of the cylinder, and a snoring is heard, similar to that produced by the German spinning top.

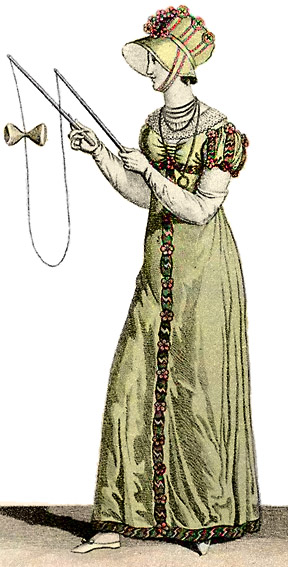
1812 illustration of woman with diabolo

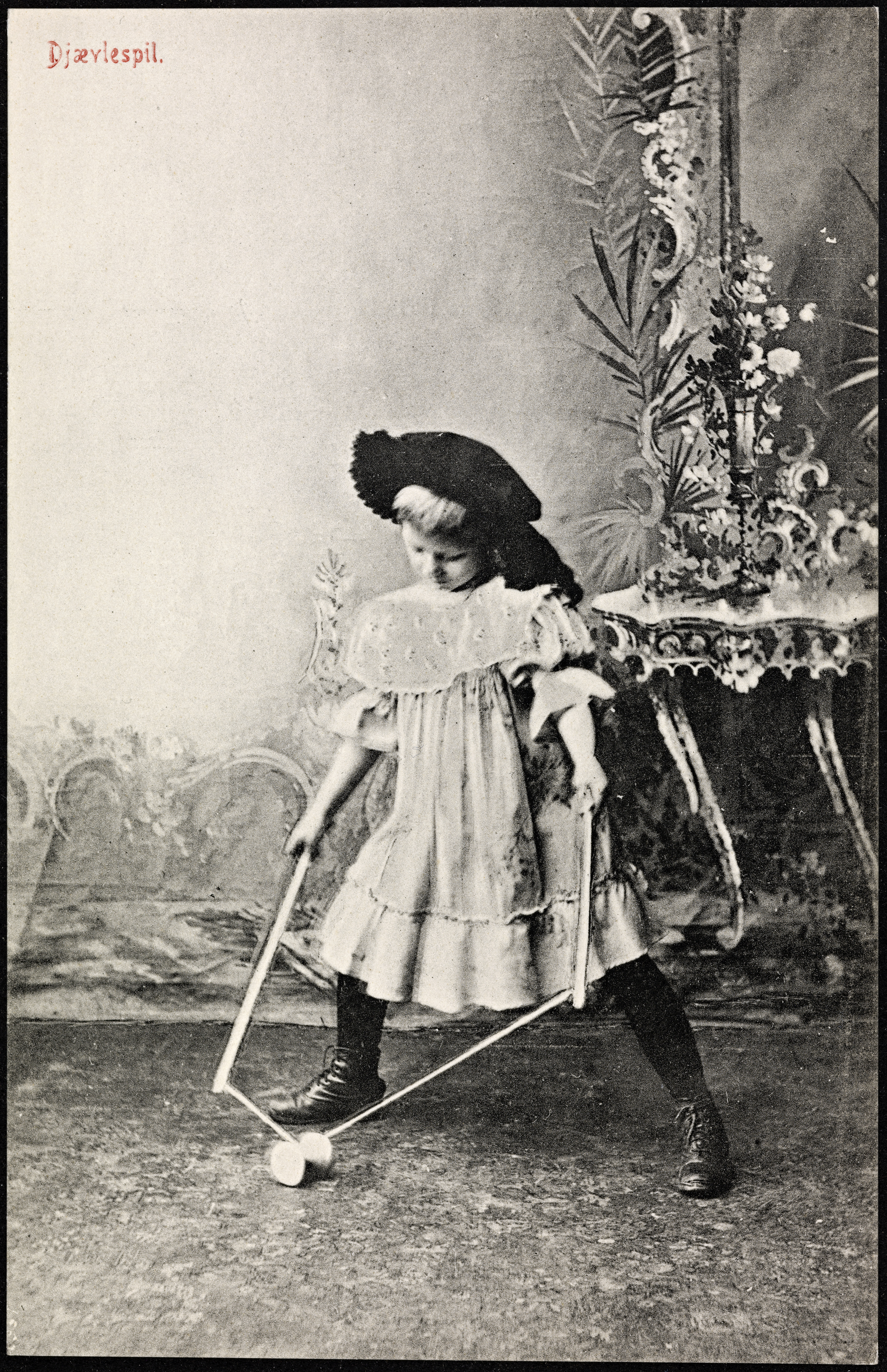
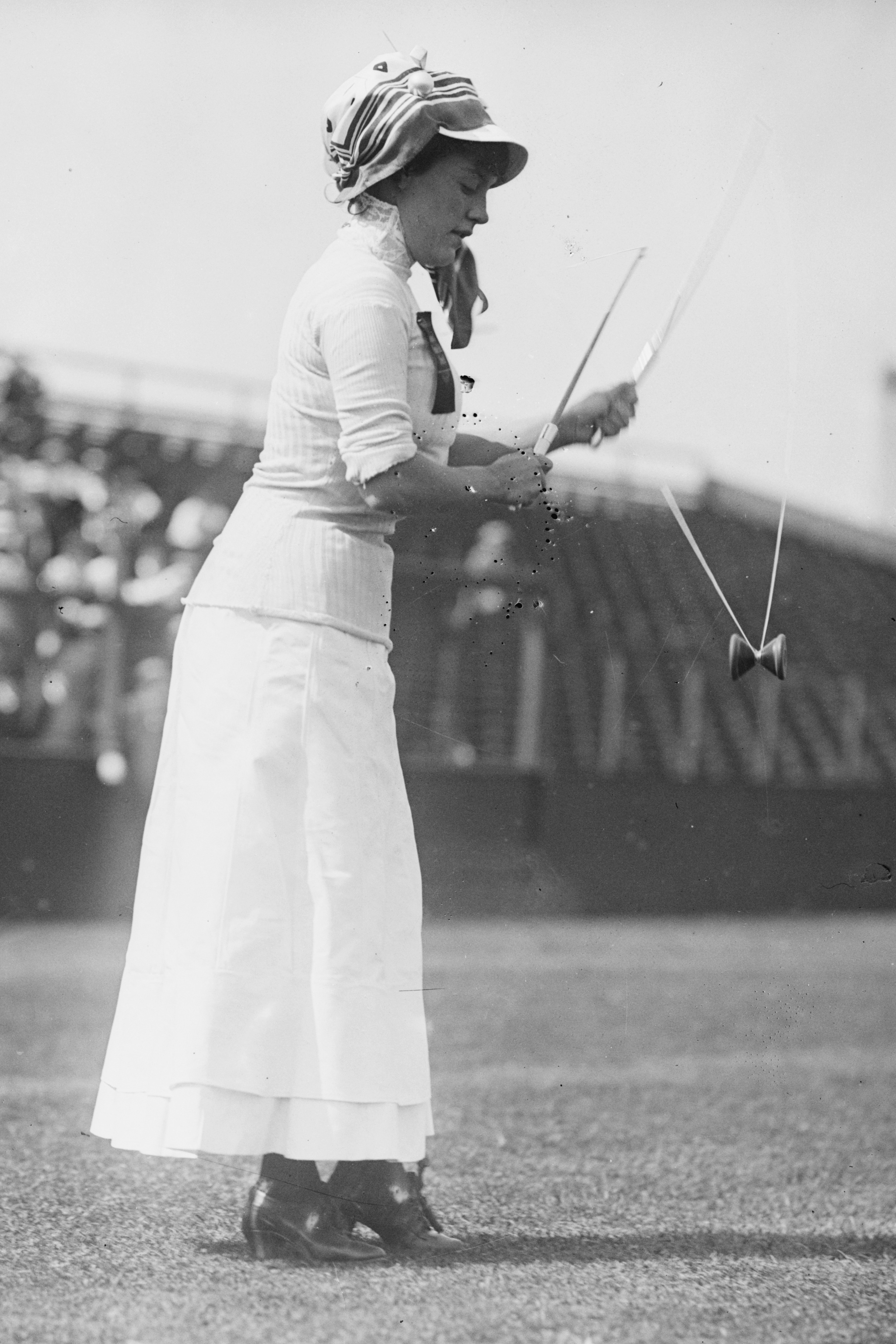
Norwegian postcard (undated) and Annette Kellermann (c. 1907)

The diabolo was part of a presentation of Chinese culture edited by stenographer Jean-Baptiste Joseph Breton in 1811–2 (La Chine en miniature). The toy's popularity waxed and waned throughout the 19th century. In 1812 the diabolo "was all the rage"; then it "enjoyed an ephemeral vogue" until it "finally fell into discredit" some time before 1861. Some consider the toy dangerous; injuries and deaths of players and bystanders have been claimed; and Préfet de Police Louis Lépine once outlawed the game in the streets of Paris.

The name "diabolo" was coined by Belgian engineer Gustave Philippart, who developed the modern diabolo in the early twentieth century, although credit has also been given to Charles Burgess Fry (The Outdoor Magazine in 1906) or Fry and Philippart. The ODE gives the term's origin as from ecclesiastical Latin diabolus (devil) via Italian, reflecting the older name, "The devil on two sticks".

Strong derives the name from the Greek dia bolo, roughly meaning 'across throw': "In Greek, the term 'diaballo', means to throw across. It comes from a combination of 'dia' meaning across or through (as in the diameter of a circle, a line that crosses circle), and 'bolla' or originally 'ballo' which means to throw..." However, Philippart's intention is clear in his 1905 patent, where he gives it the alternative French name Diable, "Devil". The term "loriot" was also used in England early in the twentieth century, as well as "rocket-ball". The earlier name "The devil on two sticks" is sometimes still seen, although nowadays this more often refers to another circus-based skill toy, the devil stick: "In time 'diabolo' was retained for the spinning version of the Chinese stick toy while the hitting version of the stick toy was rendered into English as the Devil Stick."

Philippart claimed Diabolo to be his invention. In reality, he had improved a Napoleonic toy, which in turn had originated long ago in China." However, Charles Parker acquired the U.S. license for the term diabolo in 1906, and the fad for the toy lasted until 1910 (caricatures of public figures with the toy made it to newspapers), when it was hurt greatly by a glut of unsold poor quality off-brand versions (costs ranged from one to eight dollars). The toy was even removed from the Parker Brothers catalogue, a rare occurrence (its two-year return in 1929 also failed).

An earlier occurrence of the fad, in Paris, is mentioned in Nature in 1893. The Wright brothers became enamored with the toy during a lull in a trip to France they had taken to market their Wright Flyer III airplane.

The diabolo's temporary fall from favour was commented on by the narrator of Marcel Proust's In Search of Lost Time:

One morning … I was taking a short walk with Albertine, whom I had found on the beach tossing up and catching again at the end of a string a weird object which gave her a look of Giotto's Idolatry; it was called, as it happened, a 'diabolo', and has so fallen into disuse now that, when they come upon a picture of a girl playing with one, the commentators of future generations will solemnly discuss, as it might be in front of the allegorical figures in the Arena Chapel, what it is that she is holding.

== Design ==
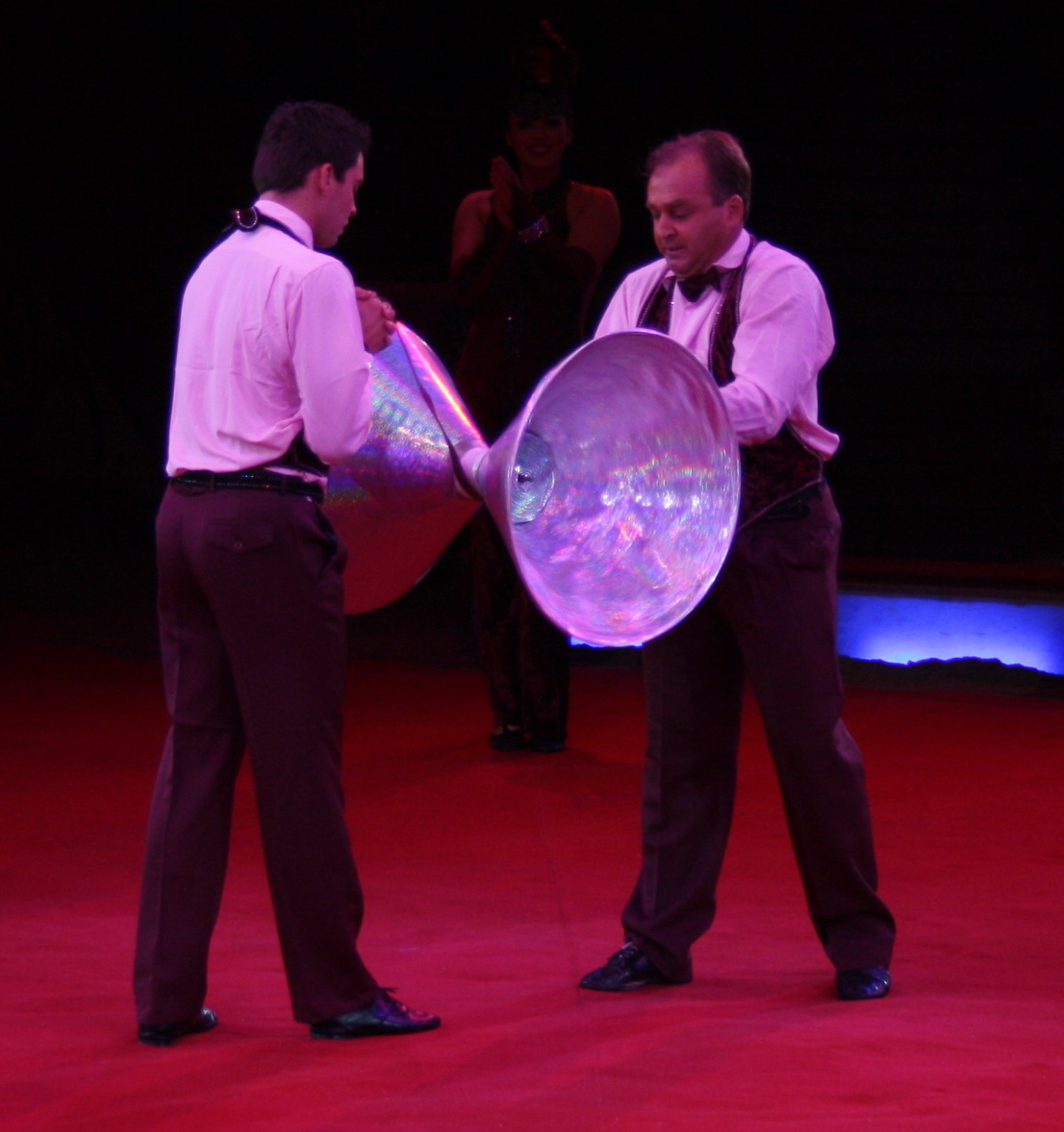
Anastasini Diabolos with large diabolo (2011)

A diabolo is described as "a double-coned bobbin that [is] twirled, tossed, and caught on a string secured by two wands, one held in each hand," and, more generally, as "an object that can be suspended on a string made taut by two held sticks". The Chinese yo-yo, often considered a type of diabolo, has been described as "a short round wooden stick with two round disks, 1.5 cm thick with a space between them, attached on either end of the stick...It will rotate on a string, each end tied to a thin stick," and as "two hollow discs of light wood, with openings in the sides, united by a peg tapering to its center".

As with the yo-yo, the design of the diabolo has varied through history and across the world. Chinese diabolos have been made of bamboo. Wooden diabolos were common in Victorian times in Britain. Rubber diabolos were first patented by Gustave Philippart in 1905. In the late twentieth century a rubberised plastic material was first used. Metal has also been used, especially for fire diabolos. "Parker Brothers used steel for the bobbins [axles], with molded rubber ends, and also made some versions out of hollow Celluloid--which, because of its 'frictionless' properties, spun even faster than steel." Holes and metal strips alter the sound of the spinning diabolo, but create friction.

The size and weight of diabolos varies. Diabolos with more weight tend to retain their momentum for longer, whereas small, light diabolos can be thrown higher and are easier to accelerate to high speeds. Rubber diabolos are less prone to breakage but are more prone to deformations. More commonly used are plastic-rubber hybrids that allow flex but hold their shape. The size of the disc or cone varies, as do the presence and size of holes in the discs or cones which may alter the sound produced. In yo-yos a cone is known as the butterfly shape. Regardless of the presence, size, and shape, "once a diabolo is spinning, the friction of the spinning diabolo against the string creates a whining sound; this is called 'making the diabolo sing.'" "When played hard, the [Chinese] yoyo will give out a sharp shrill sound...The shrill sound would add an exciting atmosphere to the [Shanghai winter] festivals...A skillful player can use a pot cover [with a round handle] as a yoyo [without sound]." A fast whirling kouen-gen produces "a shrill whistling sound...not unlike the note of the steam siren". Diabolos with only one cup ("monobolos") are also used.

The axle can be either a fixed axle or a bearing axle. The former does not spin, while the latter variety spins in one direction. Noticeable differences between the two include friction involved, the amount of time the diabolo can spin for, and tension. There are also certain tricks that are only possible with one type of axle.

== Basic principles ==
The most basic act of diabolo manipulation is to spin it on the string. "The string is placed between the circles, but in order for the diabolo to balance, it must maintain a spinning motion, much like a yo-yo." However, "considerably more skill is needed to twirl a diabolo...than the Yo-yo it resembles." "Diabolo requires hard practice and highly developed skills".

Typically, the player pulls the stick in his or her dominant hand so that the string moves along the axle, turning it. "The player...swing[s] the string right and left." By doing this repeatedly and rapidly the diabolo rotates faster. The diabolo spin can be accelerated more quickly using various methods: the 'whip' rotates the diabolo faster by moving one handstick in front of the user's body and past the other handstick, the 'wrap' rotates the diabolo faster when the user wraps a loop of the string around the axle. Both methods increase the amount of string contact with the axle in any given time.

To spin the top, you raise and lower the sticks alternately, with a quick backward shift of the string at the end of each rotating impulse. When the speed is great enough to stabilize the top in flight, just whip the sticks apart to toss it into the air. As the spool comes down you catch it on a sloping string and let it roll down into slack bunched near one end.

Once spin speed is increased to a sufficient level that the diabolo is stable, the user can then perform tricks. "Skillful players can set it whirling at a rate of 2,000 revolutions a minute, it is said." Depending on how long a trick takes to perform, the user will normally have to spend some time increasing the spin speed of the diabolo before performing other tricks. Skilled users can perform multiple tricks while maintaining the spin speed of the diabolo. "A skilled person [can] catch it, hurl it fifty or sixty feet into the air, then catch it again with little effort."

== Tricks and styles ==
=== Fundamental tricks ===
Name	Description
Toss	The diabolo is tossed in the air and then caught. The diabolist can do a turn in place or a skip over the string while the diabolo is in the air.
Trapeze/stopover	The diabolo goes under a stick and the stick touches the string, making the diabolo swing around the stick and land back on the string.
Cats cradle/spiderweb	This trick starts with a trapeze. The stick not in the trapeze is inserted between the strings on either side of the stick in the trapeze. The diabolo is tossed into the air, and the strings form an X. The diabolo is caught on the X, and then it can be tossed and caught again.
Suicide/stick release	Any trick in which the performer releases one stick, and catches it again. The stick may swing around the diabolo.
Grind	The spinning diabolo is balanced on a stick.
Sun	The diabolo is swung around in a large circle around both sticks, finishing with 2 twists of string above the diabolo. A sun in the opposite direction undoes this twist. There are many different types of suns; this is the most basic.
Orbits/satellites	The diabolo orbits around a body part such as the leg or waist.
Knot/magic knot	The line is tangled so as to create the illusion that the diabolo is knotted. It can usually be released with an upward toss motion.
Elevator/ladybug	The diabolo climbs up the string; this is done by wrapping the string around the axle and pulling tight.
Coffee grinder	The diabolo is caught on the underside of the string, and then the string is looped over one stick. From there, the diabolo is tossed multiple times over the stick.
Umbrella	The diabolo is swung and jerked side to side over both sticks, forming the outline of an umbrella.
Files	The performer puts both sticks in the left hand, swings the diabolo over the finger and back onto the string so there is a trapeze-like tangle, throws the sticks under the finger and catches them again.
Steam engine	The performer pulls the string down the side of the left stick and holds it with the left hand, then brings the right stick over the left and inside the loop created. The right stick is moved in a small circle pushing at the loop, which makes the diabolo jump.

=== Advanced tricks ===
There are countless tricks and variations that fall outside the above categories; these are often more difficult and form the cutting edge of modern diabolo routines. Some examples are:

Name	Description
Genocide	Any trick in which the stick is released and the diabolo leaves the string. The diabolo is subsequently caught on the string again, and the stick is caught again.
Whip catch	The diabolo is tossed into the air and caught with a whipping motion of the string towards the diabolo.
Finger grind	The spinning diabolo is balanced on a finger. This is best done with a bearing or triple bearing diabolo.
Infinite suicides	The diabolo appears to be suspended while one stick repeatedly orbits it, and the other stick travels in circles around the diabolo.
Slack whips	The stick or sticks are flicked in such a way that a loop of slack in the string is made; this then passes around the diabolo and/or sticks to attain a range of different string mounts.
Excalibur/vertical	A series of tricks in which the diabolo is turned vertical. Many tricks normally done outside of vertical can also be done in vertical.
Integral	Any trick in which at least one stick is released while the string is held.
Star Cradle	The strings are twisted into a star-shaped pattern.

=== Multiple diabolos ===
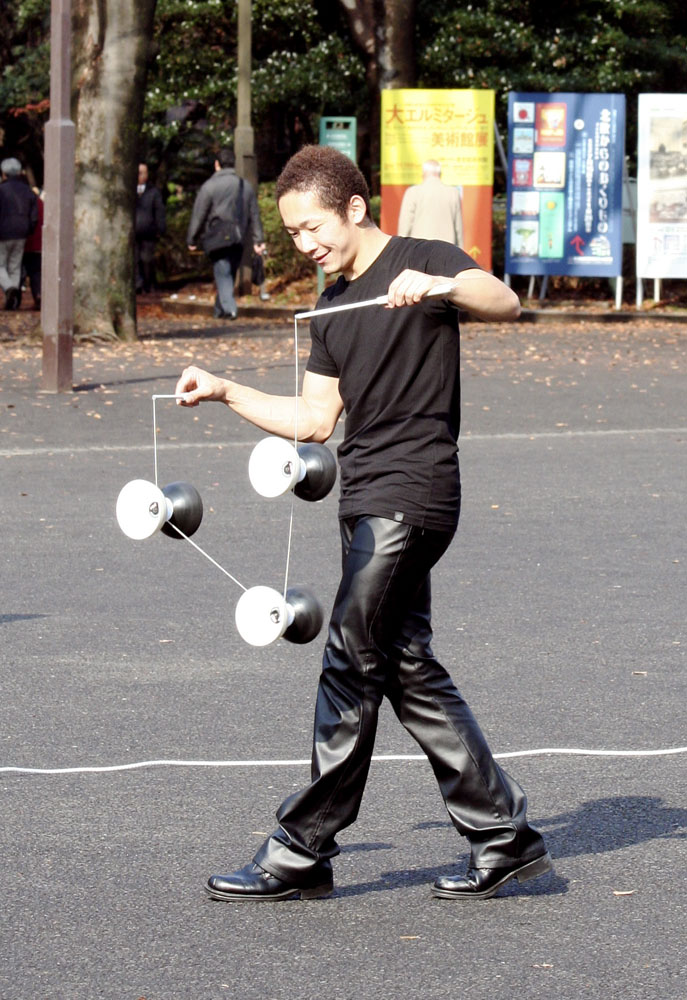
Diaboloist in Ueno Park performing a 3-diabolo shuffle (2006)

Perhaps the most active area of development for diabolo performance involves tricks with more than one diabolo on a single string. When manipulating multiple diabolos "low", the diabolos orbit continuously on the string in a "shuffle". Shuffles are either synchronous (commonly referred to as "sync") or asynchronous ("async"), depending on whether the diaboloist's hands' movements occur simultaneously or not; shuffles may also be performed with only one hand.

Juggling multiple diabolos "high" involves continuously catching and throwing a number of diabolos, never with more than one diabolo on the string simultaneously. Diaboloists have pushed the number of diabolos juggled at once up to six "high" (although there is some controversy as to whether this counts as the number of catches achieved is so small) and five "low". Most diaboloists, however, stick to using only two or three diabolos at once. The introduction of multiple diabolos on a single string allows for many new moves. Many are applications of one-diabolo moves to multiple diabolos.

=== Vertax ===
Another advanced diabolo style is vertax (vertical axis; also known as "Excalibur"). This is where the diabolo is "turned vertically" by means of "whipping" and is continually spun in this upright state. The person spinning it needs to rotate their body to keep up with the constant whipping action due to the momentum and centripetal motion at which the diabolo spins. Although the number of tricks seems limited, people are finding more ways to perform with this style, including vertax genocides, infinite suicides, and many suns, orbits, and satellites. It is also possible to have two diabolos in one string in vertax; this feat has been achieved by a small number of diaboloists. It has also been done in the form of a fan. Most of these tricks are accomplished by street performers in competitions, notably the GEDC and the Taipei PEC. Some cutting-edge skilled vertax jugglers include William (Wei-Liang) Lin (in 2006, ranked #1 in the world), Ryo Yabe (multiple diabolos), Higami (a Japanese juggling group, noted for inventing the first 'infinite suicide vertax'), and Jonathan P. Chen (noted for inventing the vertax genocide); these jugglers are former and multiple winners of the above-mentioned cups. Eric and Antonin (France) and Nate and Jacob Sharpe (USA) have contributed greatly to the development of vertax passing techniques. Finally, Alexis Levillon invented many vertax tricks including vertax integrals, furthered multidiabolo vertax, and has also invented the "Galexis" style, where one diabolo is horizontal, while the other is in vertax.

=== Contact diabolo ===
This is a relatively recent style of diabolo that is gaining popularity. It utilizes the diabolo so that it has little or no spin at all. Then it can be caught and passed and manipulated with different parts of the body instead of just the sticks and string. It has new possibilities and new ideas are arising from this. Examples include catching the diabolo between one's arm and the stick before throwing it back. Tricks with multiple diabolos have also been developed.

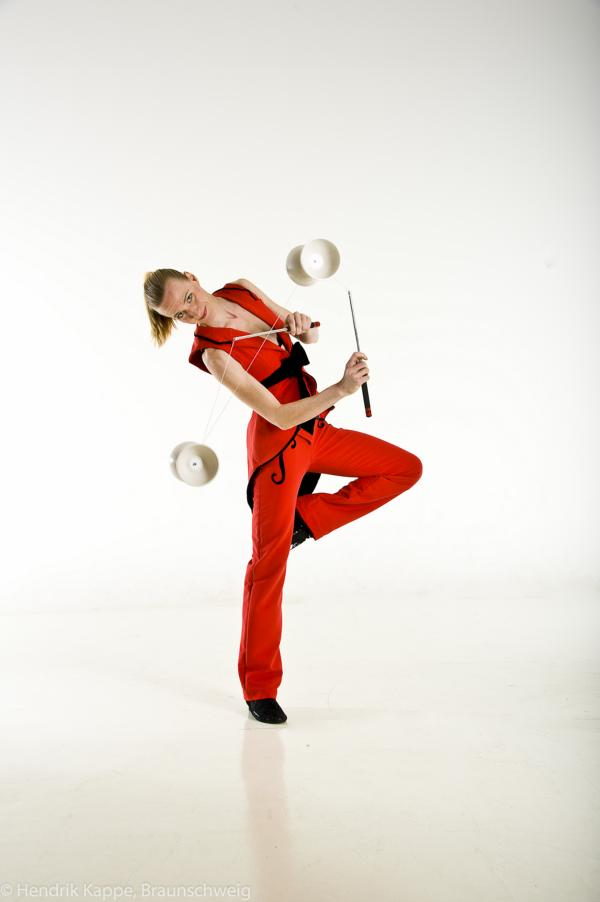
Diabolo juggling

=== Loop diabolo ===
Instead of having two sticks connected by a string, the diabolo is manipulated on a loop of string held around the hands. This opens up a variety of new tricks. Yo-yo type slack tricks can also be performed in a loop.

=== Monobolo ===
Monobolo is a variation of the diabolo where instead of having two diabolo cups, there is only one and a weight on the other side. The monobolo can be used in the same fashion as normal diabolos. However, if a monobolo is put into excalibur, or horizontally, monobolos can be manipulated to be like a spinning top. To start a monobolo, twist the string around the axle and then let it gain some speed.

== Performances ==
Cirque du Soleil has combined diabolos with acrobatics during feature acts in five shows: Quidam, La Nouba, Dralion, Ovo and Viva Elvis.

In 2006 Circus Smirkus presented a duo diabolo act starring Jacob and Nate Sharpe, with advanced tricks including the first double sprinkler pass in a performance as well as some five-diabolo passing.

The diabolo programs of many Chinese schools provide performances during the Chinese New Year or near the end of the school year.

== See also ==
- List of skill toys
- Suzanne Lenglen – Tennis champion and former notable diabolo performer.
