= Astrojax =

Toy consisting of three balls on a string

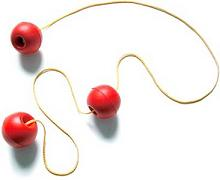
Astrojax Plus

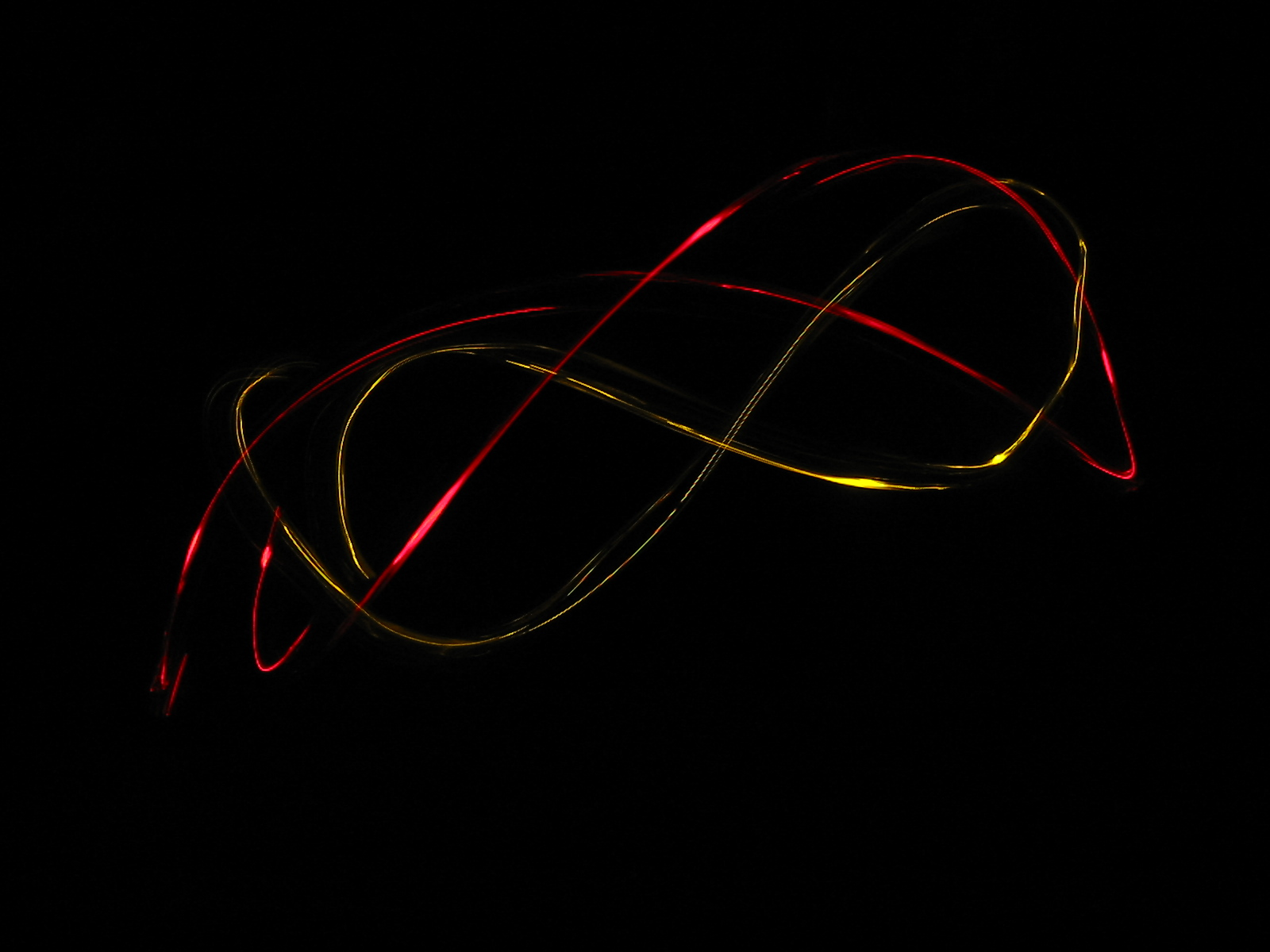
A light trail from an Astrojax Saturn

Astrojax, invented in 1986 by Larry Shaw, is a toy consisting of three balls on a string. In the original version of the toy, one ball is fixed at each end of the string, and the center ball is free to slide along the string between the two end balls. Inside each ball is a metal weight. The metal weight lowers the moment of inertia of the center ball so it can rotate rapidly in response to torques applied by the string. This prevents the string from snagging or tangling around the center ball.

Roughly, Astrojax play is a cross between juggling, yo-yo, and lasso. A wide variety of tricks and maneuvers can be performed with it. The basic orbits are vertical orbits, horizontal orbits and a figure-eight (butterfly) pattern.

== History ==
Astrojax has been used to teach physics at the grade school, high school, and college levels, NASA has taken Astrojax into outer space as part of its Toys in Space education program, and Astrojax has even been the subject of research on nonlinear dynamics, chaos, and the N-body problem on a sphere using sophisticated computer modeling and advanced mathematics. Astrojax can, for instance, be used to demonstrate conservation of angular momentum, how reducing an object's moment of inertia will increase the object's angular velocity, and how the earth's gravity keeps the moon in its orbit.

Astrojax was invented by Cornell University physics graduate student Larry Shaw in 1986 while fiddling with hex nuts and dental floss. It first appeared on the market in 1994 as a polyurethane foam version, when it was sold through The Nature Company, under the name of "Orbit Balls". Over the next several years it was sold by New Toy Classics. From 2000 to 2015, Astrojax was licensed by Active People, a Swiss company specializing in yo-yos, juggling toys, kites and open-ended toys such as Bilibo. In 2003 corporate chains such as Target, Walmart, KB Toys, and Toys-R-Us started to carry the product.

Several different types of Astrojax were sold by Active People, including:

- The Plus is made of a soft foam and, because of the softness of the balls, is the best version for beginners. It is good for rebound tricks but not particularly showy. It is the same as the version sold by New Toy Classics in the mid-1990s.
- The V-max is made from a durable polycarbonate. Because of the reduced friction, the V-max is good for faster moves. The V-max is available in a variety of colours, including half-chromed collectors' editions Black Jack, Amber, Lagoon, Snow White, Pachuli and Hyper Frog.
- The Saturn is made from high-quality plastic and has LEDs inside each ball. The LEDs can be set to be constantly on or a strobing, "disco" mode. The standard Saturn has balls with red, yellow and green LEDs. There is also a version with super-bright blue LEDs called the Blue Diamond.
- The liquid-filled Aqua has a soft bladder of phthalate-free PVC on a hard plastic "vortex". The fluid flows within the bladder dynamically lower the moment of inertia of the balls.
- The MX is a modular version of Astrojax. The modular components are a pressed-metal central weight, two-part vortex, outer mantel (of either foam or thermoplastic resin), string buds, and string. All the modular components, except the central weight, come in at least four colors, thereby allowing a large number of custom color combinations to be assembled.

== Legal issues ==
In 2014, Larry Shaw terminated Active People's license for Astrojax due to breaches of contract, including failure to pay royalties. In 2015, Larry Shaw initiated an international arbitration against Active People due to their continuing sales of Astrojax. The Final Award of the arbitration lawsuit included an injunction against Active People's sales of Astrojax and award to Shaw of back royalties. The Final Award assigned fees and expenses for the arbitration to Active People, indicating Active People had no legal grounds for their failure to pay royalties or honor the termination of their license for Astrojax. In 2017, a US District Court issued an award which included a federal injunction against Active People's sales of Astrojax.

In late 2017, Larry Shaw relaunched Astrojax with the Astrojax Weave. The Astrojax Weave has hand-made, fair trade crocheted balls which are stuffed with environmentally-friendly recycled cork granules. The Weave has balls which are 4.5 cm in diameter, which is larger than any previous version of Astrojax. The Weave comes in three Maya versions which have lighter balls on a shorter string, six Spectra versions which have intermediate weight balls on an intermediate length string, and two Pro versions which have heavier balls on a longer string.

=== Trademarks ===
Astrojax, Weave, Aqua, Maya, Spectra, vortex, string bud, Free-Dimensional Orbiter, Saturn, Blue Diamond, are trademarks of New Toy Classics of San Francisco, CA.

== Awards ==
Astrojax has won a number of toy awards and has been taken into outer space by NASA for their "Toys in Space" program.

There are three Astrojax categories in the Guinness Book of World Records database.

== Example tricks ==
Horizontal Orbit
One of the balls is held in the user's hand, the other two maintain horizontal orbits underneath. The two spinning balls counterbalance each other. This is maintained by small movements of the top ball to keep the orbits from slowing. The trick can be started by holding both the top and bottom balls (the top one directly below the bottom one), and spinning the middle ball. Then releasing the bottom ball creates a horizontal orbit.
Vertical Orbit
Similar to the horizontal orbit, but with the bottom and middle balls orbiting perpendicular to the ground. By tugging slightly on the ball in hand, the orbit continues however long the user desires. This is the starting movement for both tricks.
Butterfly
Starting with a vertical orbit the top hand is moved left and right quickly, in time with the rotation of the bottom ball. This causes the balls to move in a shape resembling a helix.
Switch
During a vertical orbit the top ball is released and the bottom ball is caught. The orbit now continues with their positions reversed. This trick can be performed repeatedly to add to the effect.
Venus
The bottom ball of a vertical orbit is pulled hard so that it travels over the users arm, followed by the middle ball. This trick can also be repeated for added effect.
Thriller or "Eskimo Yo-Yo"
Hold the middle ball in one hand and start swinging the right ball around it. Then, throw the left ball around and around and watch them swing.

== See also ==
- Alaskan yo-yo
