= Pogo Ball =

Toy

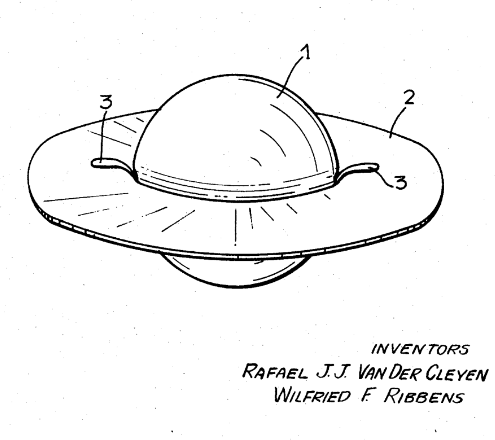
Illustration of the toy from its patent

The Pogo Ball (also known as a Pogo Bal, Springbal, Lolo Ball, Lolobal, Disc-O or Pogo-It) is a toy device for jumping off the ground. It consists of a seamless figure-8 rubber ball locked into a structurally supported, plastic platform. To play with it, one stands on the plastic platform, balancing one's weight on the bottom portion of the rubber ball, and jumps or hops around in the same manner as one would use a pogo stick.

== History ==
Invented by two Belgian men, Van Der Cleyen and Ribbens, in 1969, the Pogo Bal became a fad in the mid-1980s when Hasbro mass-produced it. Hasbro produced the toy until the early 1990s, and similar products have been made by other manufacturers. One of the current examples of a modern lolo ball is the Little Tikes' Pogo-It, released in 2017. It has two game modes and a more colorful look complete with LED lights.
