= Bilibo =

Swiss-designed plastic children's toy

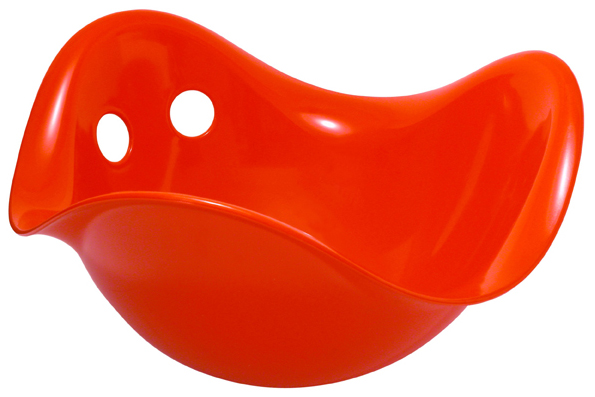
- Inventor(s): Alex Hochstrasser
- Country: Switzerland
- Availability: 2001–present
- Materials: Plastic
- Official website

Bilibo is a "shell-shaped, hard-wearing piece of plastic" used as a toy. It is produced in six different colors. It was developed in 2001 by Swiss designer Alex Hochstrasser in consultation with experts for child development.

The form has been designed for children of various ages to sit comfortably in the shell whilst controlling their movements by touching the ground with their hands and feet.

According to a child's age and interests Bilibo is used as an accessory for role- and fantasy-play, it can be filled with objects, sand or water and emptied again or stacked. Rocking, spinning and balancing in or on the shell helps develop motor skills and the child's sense of balance. The shells are also used in physiotherapy to stimulate the vestibular and proprioceptive systems.

Children on Richard & Judy could generally be seen to prefer cardboard boxes to the Bilibo, and confirmed this preference when asked.

Bilibo has received several international awards, including Spiel Gut in Germany, the Swiss Product Design Award in 2002 and Toy of the Year – UK Good Toy Awards in 2006.
