= Devil sticks =

Gyroscopic juggling prop

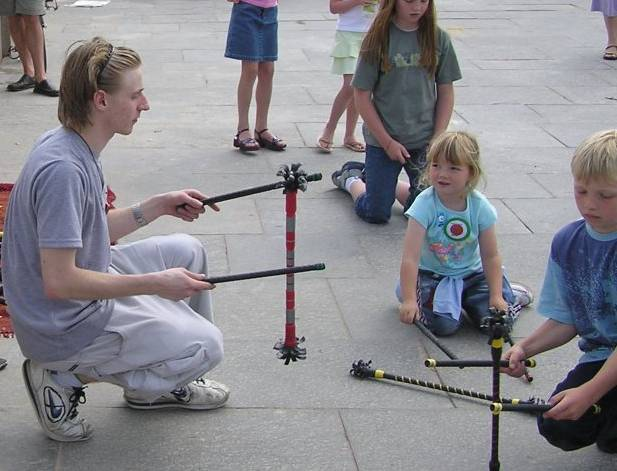
Children learning 'the pendulum'

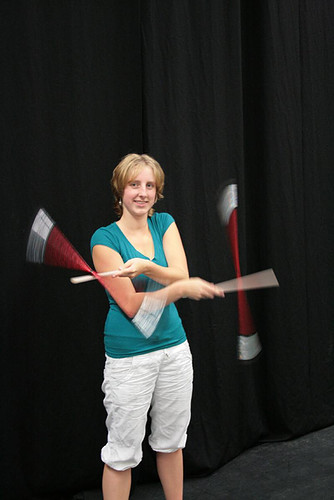
Manipulating two devilsticks simultaneously

The manipulation of the devil stick (also devil-sticks, devilsticks, fiddle sticks, flower sticks, bâtons fleurs, stunt sticks, gravity sticks, or juggling sticks) is a form of gyroscopic juggling or equilibristics, consisting of manipulating one stick ("baton", 'center stick') between one or two other sticks held one in each hand. The baton is lifted, struck, or stroked by the two control sticks ('handsticks', 'sidesticks', or 'handles'), stabilizing the baton through gyroscopic motion.

Manipulating devil sticks is one of the circus arts and is sometimes called devil-sticking, twirling, sticking, or stick juggling.

== History ==
Devil sticks are believed to have originated in China in the distant past as simple wooden juggling sticks. Although devil sticks are often described as having ancient origins in China, some sources note that the earliest verifiable documentation dates to the early 19th century, including documented performances in Europe and an image of the Indian performers Medua and Mooty Samme printed in Prague around 1820. It was apparently brought to Britain sometime around 1813, when a publication mentioned that previous generations had not known of it.

The first scientific analysis of the physics behind the game, known as "the Devil on Two Sticks," was published in 1855 by Benjamin Peirce.

== Variants ==
Devil sticks vary widely in size and construction materials, but the batons are generally based on one of two basic designs: tapered and straight. Tapered batons are tapered from the ends towards the middle such that the middle is thinner than the ends. Straight batons are uniform in width but have weights attached to the ends. Rarely, a hybrid design consisting of a tapered baton with weights attached to the ends is used.

Devil sticks are usually constructed of wood, plastic, aluminum, or composite materials such as fiberglass or carbon fiber. They are most often covered with an elastomer that both increases the friction coefficient (grip) between the baton and handles as well as providing some protection against repeated drops. Infrequently, other coverings such as cloth, suede, or leather are used. Even more rarely, a vinyl or mylar covering which reduces the stick's "grip" is used.

The terms "devil stick" and "flower stick" are sometimes used interchangeably, although "flower stick" more specifically refers to straight batons with tasselled or padded ends. Flower sticks differ from traditional devil sticks in both construction and handling. While devil sticks are typically tapered or biconical in shape, flower sticks are generally straight and fitted with tasselled or weighted ends. These end attachments increase air resistance and friction, slowing the movement of the baton and allowing for greater control during manipulation. This increased drag and slower response are often cited as factors that make flower sticks more accessible for beginners compared to faster, more responsive tapered designs. As a result, flower sticks are often used in teaching environments and are associated with techniques that involve wrapping and contact-based manipulation.

Fire devil sticks (also known as firesticks) typically have an aluminum core and have fuel-soaked wicks on the ends to allow them to be set on fire for visual effect. Both flower and non-flower versions of firesticks exist.

Illuminated devilsticks can create interesting visual effects in darkness with the use of battery-powered electric 'seed' bulbs, LEDs, or with phosphorescent or chemiluminescent materials.

== Gallery ==
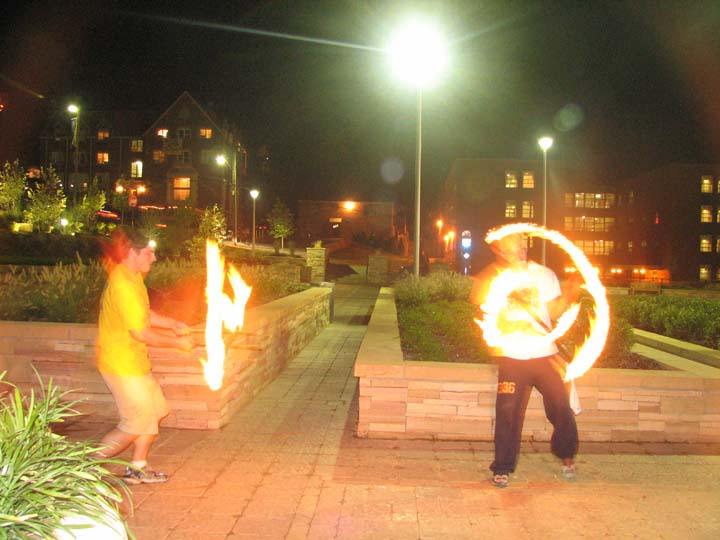
Fire devil sticks. The photographer has used a long exposure time to capture the trails of motion.

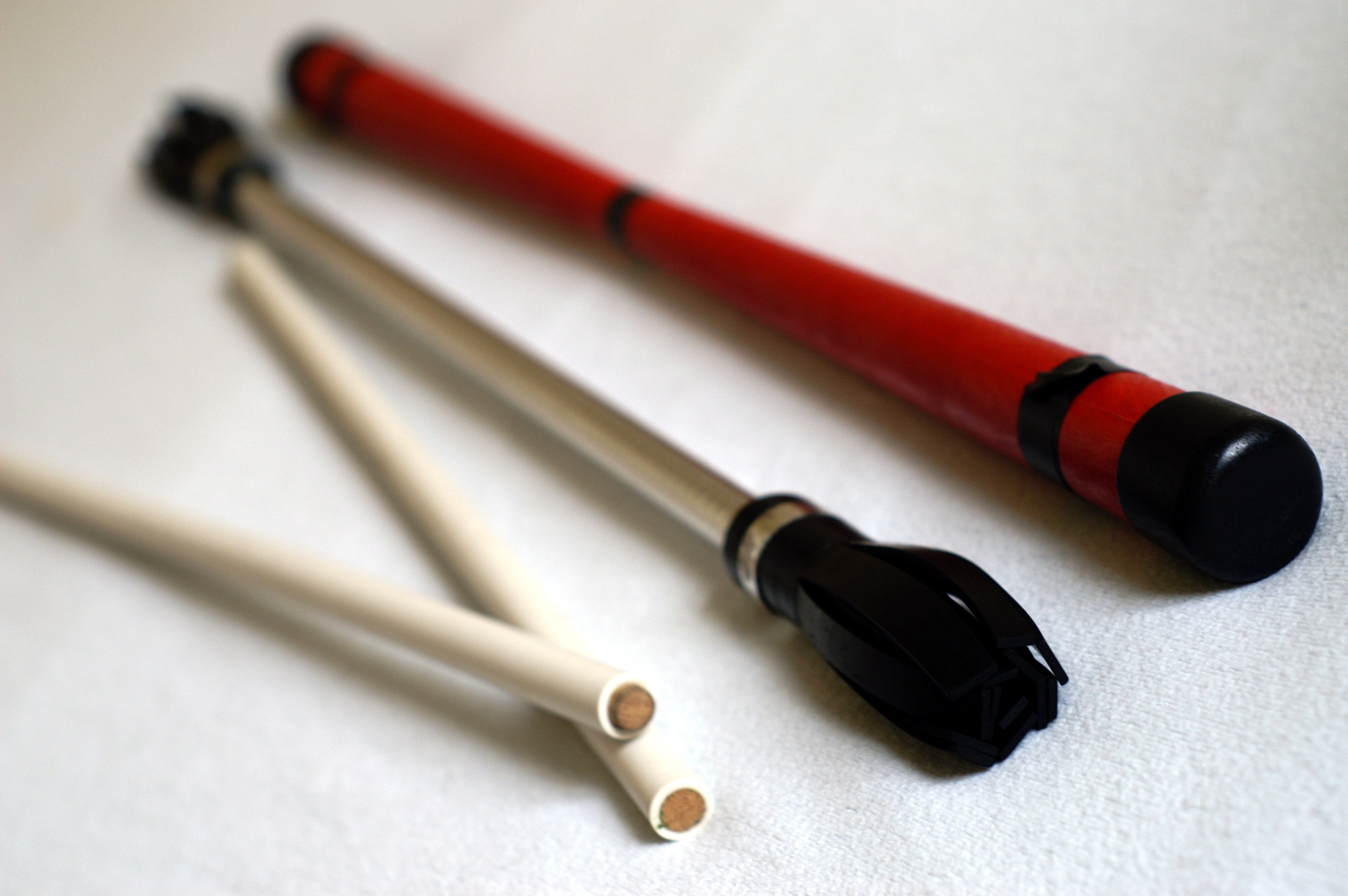
A devil stick (right), flower stick (middle, with rubber flares to slow it down), and two smaller control sticks (left)

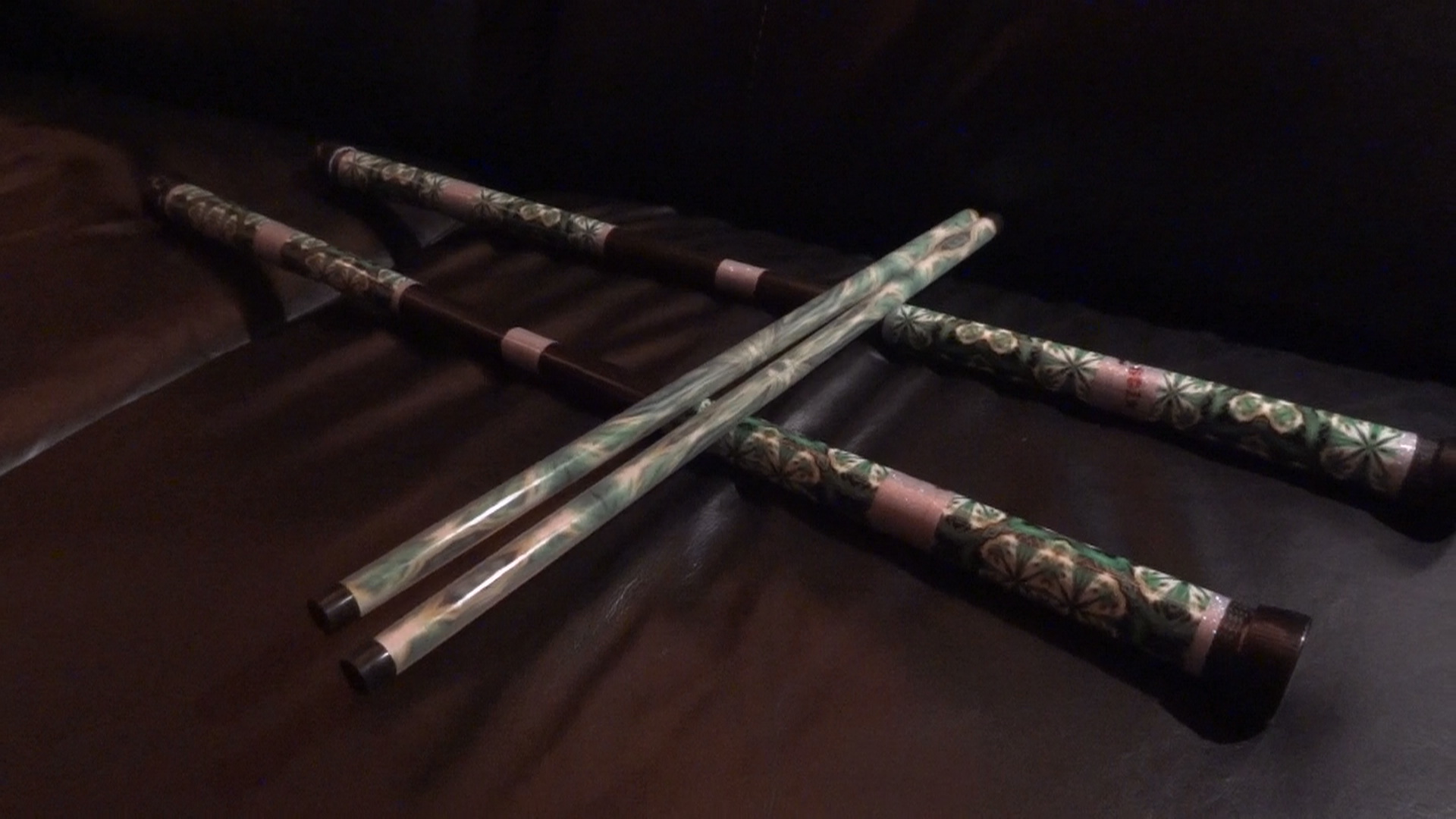
Two devilsticks and a set of handsticks

== See also ==
- Diabolo
- Dexterity play
