= Flair bartending =

Performance art in bartending

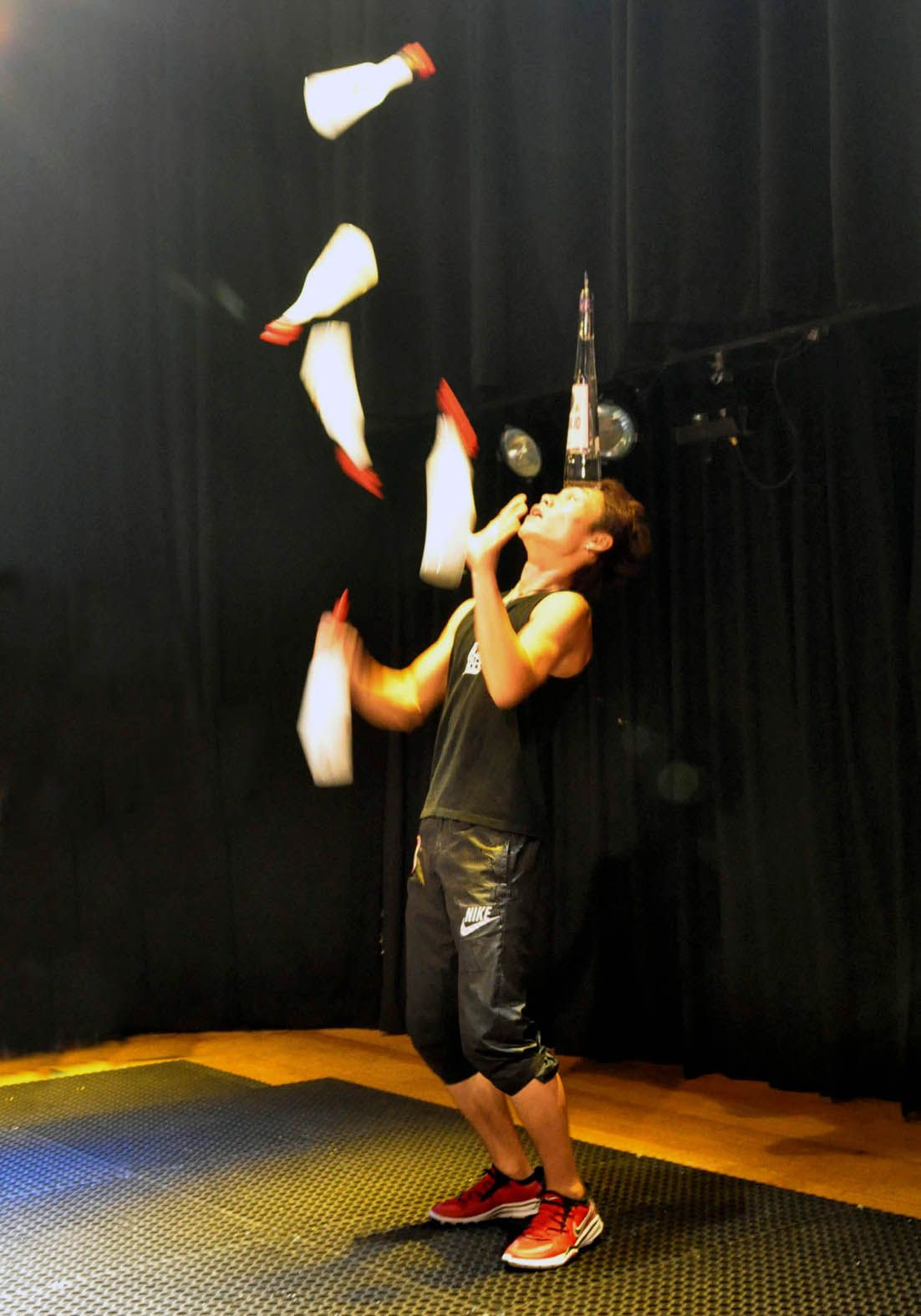
Flair bartending: Exhibition flair

Flair bartending is the practice of bartenders entertaining guests, clientele or audiences with the manipulation of bar tools (e.g. cocktail shakers) and liquor bottles in tricky, dazzling ways. Used occasionally in bars, the action requires skills commonly associated with jugglers. It has become a sought-after talent among venue owners and marketers to help advertise a liquor product or the opening of a bar establishment. Competitions have been sponsored by liquor brands to attract flair bartenders, and some hospitality training companies hold courses to teach flair techniques.

Flair bartending is sometimes referred to as "extreme bartending" or contracted to "flairtending". The word flair became popular among practitioners in the mid-1990s. "Flair" is also used as a verb (e.g., "to flair"), referring to any trickery used by a bartender in order to entertain guests while mixing a drink. Flair can include juggling, flipping (bottles, shakers), manipulating flaming liquors or even performing close-up magic tricks (also referred to as "bar-magic").

Flair is showmanship added to bartending that enhances the overall guest experience. The ideas behind mixology and drink-oriented or service-minded bartending can still be upheld with the correct application of working flair. Recently, there is a noticeable rise in bartenders combining prominent mixology knowledge and working flair skills all over the world. Working flair and exhibition flair are very similar on the grounds that they both require precision and disciplined practice comparable to a circus act; however, the use of exhibition flair has become a competition-oriented style where significantly greater risks are being taken. Working flair, which is much more common, focuses more on delivering drinks to customers while still ensuring visual entertainment.

== History ==
The earliest record of a flair bartender is barman Jerry "The Professor" Thomas, who poured fiery streams of boiling water and flaming whisky and mixed an original cocktail called the Blue Blazer in the late nineteenth century.

Flair bartending was also prominently featured in the 1988 film Cocktail starring Tom Cruise, as well as the 2000 movie Coyote Ugly.

The National Day Archives proclaimed June 10th of each calendar year is officially designated as National Flair Bartenders Day.

Paul Stenning wrote a history of the art, titled The Origins, The Golden Era, The Untold and released in 2026.

== Flair competitions ==
Both working flair and exhibition flair can be seen in competitions, depending on the rules and regulations of each event. The important distinction between working flair and exhibition flair is not so much the level of liquid in the bottles (though that is a criterion) but the speed in which the bottle is thrown and/or the drink is made. Working flair usually incorporates a "flat" throw, which is when the bottle is released into the air without flipping. This gives an illusion of the bottle floating but reduces the chances of liquid spilling. This also opens the bartender to be able to use similar routines, regardless of what bottle they grab, as the level of liquid is not a factor. The accepted definition of working flair is "flair that does not noticeably slow service", usually involving bottles filled to various levels (as in a real work situation) that are quickly manipulated and then poured. Exhibition flair almost always involves bottles that are often pre-set with less than 2 ounces (60ml) specifically for flipping. Exhibition flair often involves longer sequences and routines, multiple objects, and performances choreographed to music.

The first open competition to have an exhibition round was the Quest for the Best Bartender in 1992.

The first open competition to have a working flair round was the Quest for the Best Bartender in the World in 1999.

The first all working flair bartending competition was the Flair Bartenders Shakedown in 2006 organized by BarWars LLC.

There are different styles of flair bartending competitions. Legends of Bartending World Bartender Championships test the bartender on four disciplines of bartending, accuracy, speed, working flair and exhibition flair. The Blue Blazer and Independent Flair League in Poland rewards flair and mixology together; competitors gain points for both flair and creative mixology. NATIONS International Flair Challenge and other competitions like Roadhouse World Flair, MBA, and the Athens Flair Open feature pure exhibition flair.

== Competition history ==
In 1986, T.G.I. Friday's management encouraged their bartenders to show their personalities behind the bar and this resulted in several bartenders (a few being John JB Bandy, John Mescall, and Magic Mike) being sent to the corporate T.G.I. Friday's office in Texas to shoot a bartending video. At the end of 1986, T.G.I. Friday's hosted the first national flair bartending competition called "Bar Olympics" in Woodland Hills, California. John JB Bandy was the winner of this competition. In 1987, after interviewing 34 bartenders, John JB Bandy was approached across the bar by Touchstone Pictures to assist in training Tom Cruise and Bryan Brown for the 1988 film, Cocktail. Later that year after filming, John JB Bandy produced the first flair bartending training video called "Olympic Bartending". T.G.I. Friday's is credited for modernizing and popularizing flair bartending in the United States beginning in the mid-1980s because they allowed artistic personality freedom behind the bar. London (Roadhouse) and Orlando (Quest for the Best at Pleasure Island's Manniquins) were the hotbeds of flair bartending in the early and mid-1990s. In 1991, T.G.I. Friday's started its global competition called World Bartender Championship. The global competition has continued to today with divisional champions from across the US, Latin America and European Divisions coming to compete in Carrollton, Texas.

== Current competitions ==
There are hundreds of flair bartending competitions around the world each year, most of which are local and not well publicized. In 2005 the Flair Bartenders Association (FBA) launched the FBA Pro Tour, a linked series of events where competitors earn points toward the title Pro Tour Champion at the end of the year. In 2007 there were 14 events on the Pro Tour with 7 of them located in the US.

Five-Time World Champion Ken Hall and Jim Allison, president of the FBA, organized six of those seven events. The flagship flair bartending event is Legends of Bartending, which celebrated its twelfth year in 2010.

In 2008 the World Flair Association launched the WFA Grand Slam. A worldwide tournament the includes the best competitions from all over the world. It is seen today as the biggest competition/tournament to win in the world of flair. Bartenders travel far and wide for the Grand Slam events to try and earn the title of Grand Slam World Champion. The Grand Slam events vary each year, being located in Europe, Asia, and America.

Some of the biggest Flair Bartending competitions happening as of 2025 include:

- Legends World Flair, Albufeira, Portugal – €20,000 total prize money
- Zante Flair Open, Zakynthos, Greece – €15,000 total prize money
- FoodTown Flair Challenge, Warsaw, Poland – €15,000 total prize money
- Dyynit Flair Derby, Kalajoki, Finland – €5,000 total prize money
- Marriott Flair Crash, Bucharest, Romania – €15,000 total prize money

Some the biggest Flair bartending competitions from the past include:

- Roadhouse World Flair in (Covent Garden) London, UK
- Legends of Bartending (Las Vegas, US) – discontinued
- Quest (Orlando – the oldest major flair competition in the world) – discontinued
- Skyy Global Flair Challenge in 14 different countries including China, UK, Canada, Israel, Czech Republic, Germany, Brazil, Mexico, etc. – discontinued

The International Bartenders Association was founded in 1951. In 2000, the IBA initiated a World Flair Competition. This event is held at the IBA's annual congress of members, together with the organization's World Classic Cocktail Competition (inaugurated in 1955).

== See also ==
- Drinking culture
- List of public house topics
