= Eskimo yo-yo =

Traditional two-balled skill toy

Basic motion of the yo-yo. The handle must be moved rhythmically to maintain the orbits.

An Eskimo yo-yo (Note: "Eskimo" may be considered a derogatory term.) or Alaska yo-yo (Note: Known in English as Eskimo yo-yo, Alaskan yo-yo, Alaska Eskimo yo-yo, Alaskan Eskimo yo-yo, Alaskan Inuit Eskimo yo-yo, Alaska Native yo-yo, Inuit yo-yo, Inupiat yo-yo, Yup'ik yo-yo, Yupik yo-yo or Eskimo bolo, Arctic bolo, Mountain bolo) (Central Yupik: yuuyuuk; Inupiaq: igruuraak) is a traditional two-balled skill toy played and performed by the Eskimo-speaking Alaska Natives, such as Inupiat, Siberian Yupik, and Yup'ik. Although covered with fur, it resembles bolas or a yo-yo. It is regarded as one of the most simple, yet most complex, cultural artifacts/toys in the world. The Eskimo yo-yo involves simultaneously swinging two sealskin balls suspended on caribou sinew strings in opposite directions with one hand. It is popular with Alaskans and tourists alike. This traditional toy is two unequal lengths of twine, joined together, with hand-made leather objects (balls, bells, hearts) at the ends of the twine. (Note: Definitions: "The Eskimo Bolo has been used for years in many cultures and has been known as Mountain Bolo, Eskimo Yo-yo, and other names. Some ancient cultures used a similar device as a hunting weapon. The object of the Eskimo Bolo is to make the balls circle in opposite directions at the same time. Each cord is a different length to allow the balls to pass without striking one another."; "The Eskimo yo-yo is a toy popular with Alaskans and tourists alike that involves rotating two sealskin balls suspended on sinew strings in opposite directions. It probably evolved on St. Lawrence Island from the similarly constructed sinew and rock bolas used in bird hunting."; "Based on a bola design, in olden times tools like this were made of rocks tethered together with sinew and were used to catch birds...the two ends can be made to rotate in opposite directions – that is, with one end revolving around the center handle clockwise, and the other revolving counterclockwise."; "An 'Eskimo yo-yo' is a toy consisting of two objects attached to strings of slightly different lengths. The player twirls the strings so that the objects circle in opposite directions. Miniature mukluks, small stuffed fur animals such as birds or seals, and ptarmigan feet are common yo-yo attachments."; "This game consists of two pieces connected by a sinew, yarn, or strings. They have a handle of wood, bone, or ivory. The pieces are covered with seal skin. The object is to keep the balls swinging in opposite directions. To play, start one ball swinging in one direction, then toss the other ball in the opposite direction (one yo-yo string should be slightly longer than the other). A slight up and down movement of the wrist will help prevent the balls from striking each other."; "The Eskimo yo-yo is a training version of the bolo weapon. To play with an Eskimo yo-yo, get the two orbitals spinning in opposite directions—it's harder than you might think!")

The object of the Eskimo yo-yo is to make the balls circle in opposite directions at the same time. Each cord is a different length to allow the balls to pass without striking one another, and the balls are powered by centripetal force (as they rise the performer pumps down, while they fall the performer pumps up). This basic trick may be referred to as the "Eskimo orbit", and the orbit may be performed vertically, horizontally, or (horizontally) above one's head. Other tricks or patterns include atypical beginnings and wrapping and/or bouncing the strings around a part of one's body and then continuing with the orbit. A three-ball version of the Eskimo yo-yo also exists, and this requires all three balls to be moving at the same time.

The objects at the end of the string are made in a variety of shapes, ranging from seals, ptarmigan feet and dolls, to miniature mukluks and simple balls. The handle may be wood, bone, or ivory, as well as baleen. Many are plainly decorated; others display elaborate decorations, fine beadwork, and intricate details. The Eskimo yo-yo is bola, toy, and art form all rolled into one. One of their most popular forms of the Alaska Native art are yo-yos. Also, this is a popular tourist art found in gift shops across Alaska. See: Indian Arts and Crafts Act of 1990. Much like the spinning top (e.g. Maxwell's top), the yo-yo may also be used to demonstrate visual properties such as optical rotation and circular dichroism.

Though the early history of the Eskimo yo-yo is not recorded, Eskimos maintain that this game originated as an important and widely used hunting tool made simply with sinew and bones, the bola. It possibly evolved on St. Lawrence Island from the similarly constructed sinew and rock bolas used in bird hunting.

== See also ==
- Astrojax
- Blanket toss
- Bolas
- Clackers
- Eskimo bowline
- Euler top
- Gyroscope
- Meteor hammer
- Poi (performance art)
- Whirly tube
