= Jennifer Miller =

American circus entertainer, writer and professor

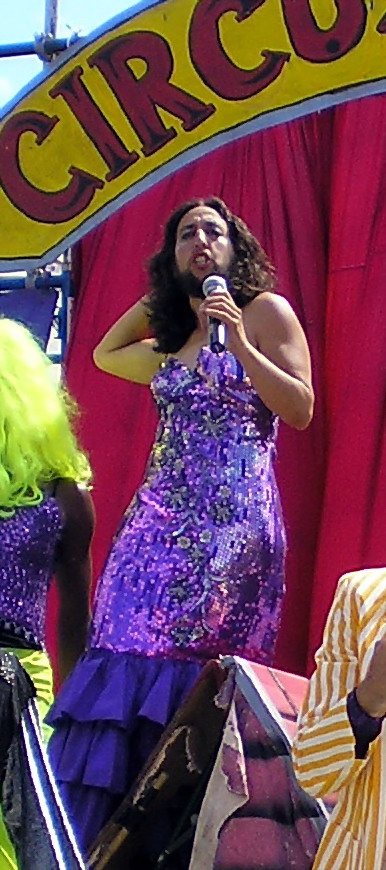
- Born: 1961 (age 64–65); United States
- Occupations: Circus performer; writer; professor

Jennifer Miller (born 1961) is an American circus entertainer, writer, and professor at Pratt Institute in Brooklyn, New York. She has lived with a beard for most of her life. She is a juggler and fire eater. Miller lives in New York City.

== Biography ==
Miller is the youngest daughter of two Quaker professors and grew up in Connecticut and California. Miller became involved in the performing arts and theater while in high school, and was involved in the downtown dance scene in New York in the early 1980s. In her career as a performing artist, which has spanned over 20 years, she has performed with numerous choreographers and dancers, several circus companies, and in the Coney Island SideShow. Miller has also collaborated on theatrical works with Sarah Schulman.

In 1989, she established the acclaimed NYC political performance troupe Circus Amok. She was also a focus of Tami Gold's documentary Juggling Gender, an exploratory piece addressing themes of androgyny, gender classification and identification, feminism, and femaleness through a singular focal character, Jennifer Miller herself. Circus Amok has been the subject of numerous documentary films. Miller is widely recognized for her work and is the recipient of awards including the Obie, Bessie, BAX 10, and, most recently, the Ethyl Eichelberger Award. She currently teaches in New York at Pratt Institute, and has taught at several universities including UCLA, Cal Arts, Scripps College, Trinity/La MaMa Performing Arts Program and NYU.

In 2010, Miller served as a co-hostess to Vaginal Davis' performance piece "Speaking from the Diaphragm" at Performance Space 122.

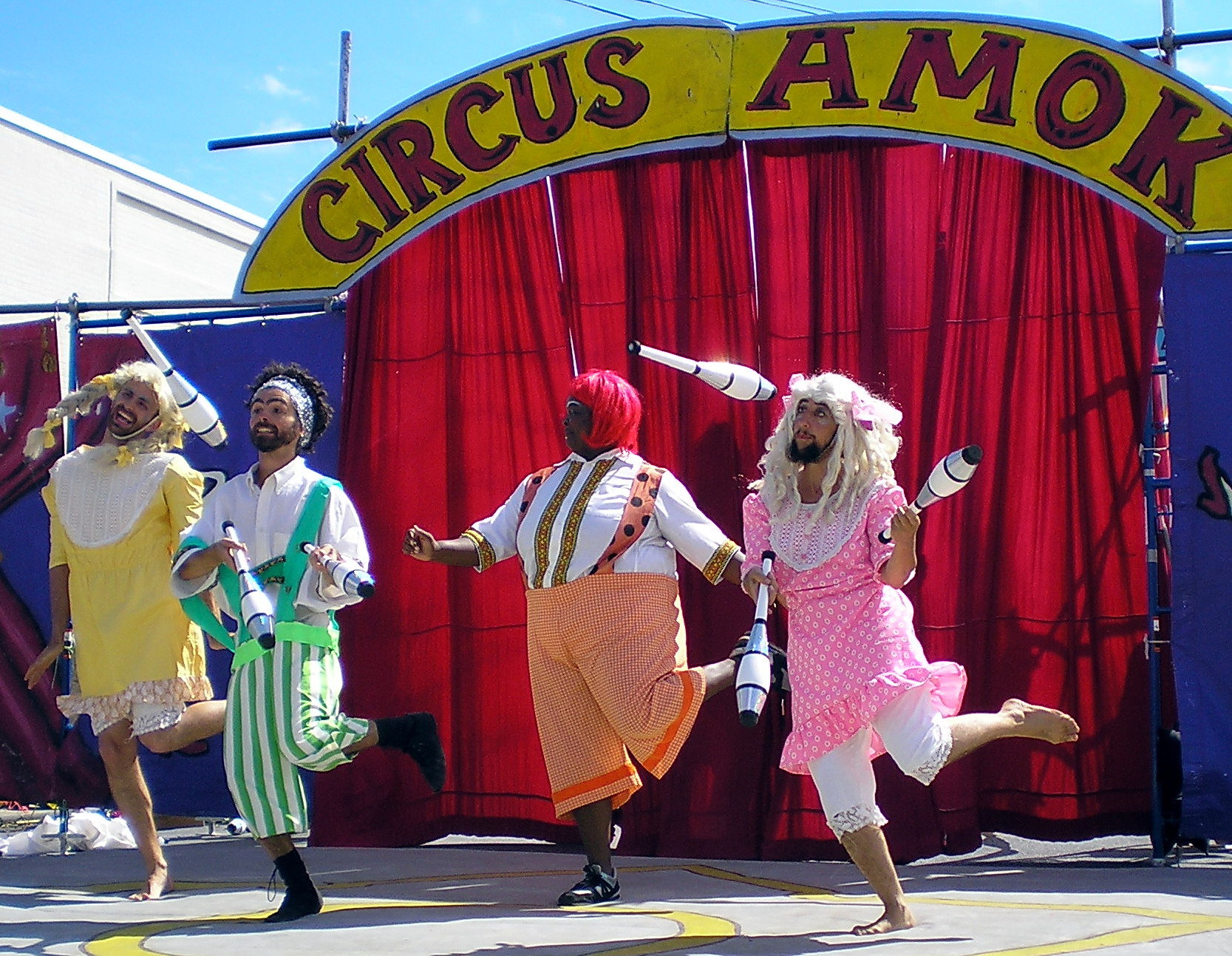

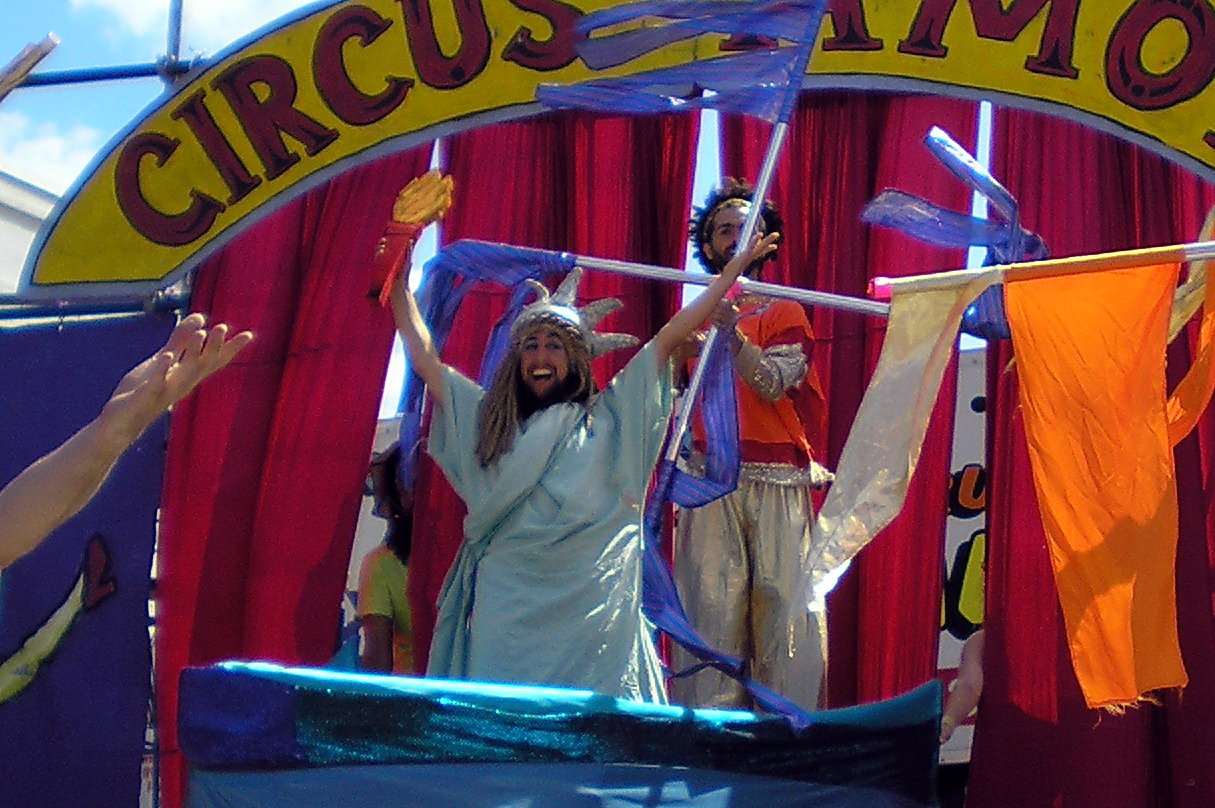

== See also ==
- Bearded lady
- Circus Amok
