= Ariana and the Rose =

American singer and songwriter

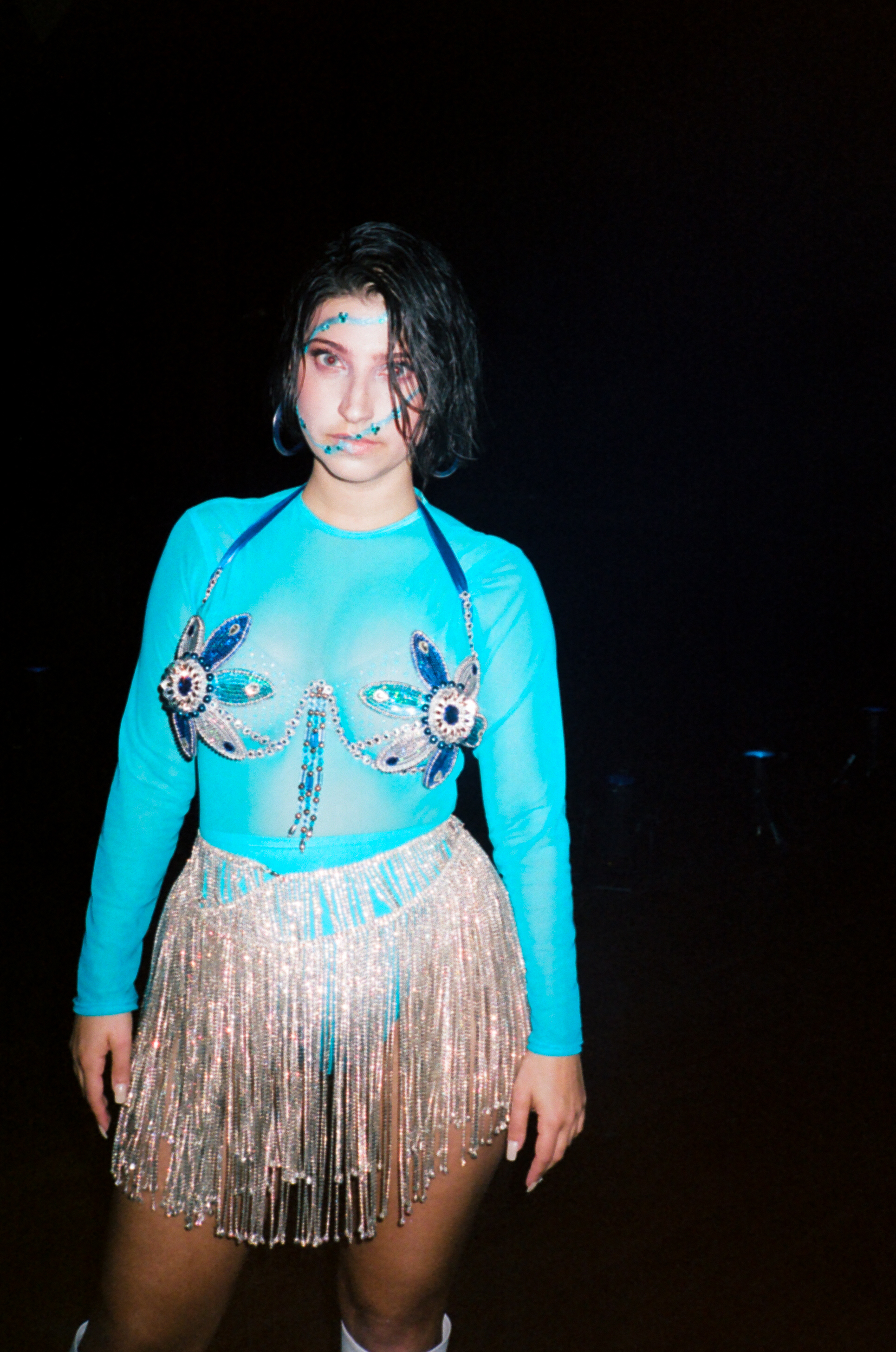

Background information
- Origin: New York, New York
- Genre: Synth-pop
- Years active: 2013–present
- Label: Pookiebird
- Members: Ariana DiLorenzo
- Website: www.arianaandtherose.com

Ariana DiLorenzo, known professionally as Ariana and the Rose is an American singer and songwriter from New York, New York.

== History ==
Ariana and the Rose released her first EP Head vs Heart in February 2014, after releasing the single HeartBeat in November 2013. In 2015, Ariana and the Rose released a song titled "Give Up The Ghost". Ariana and the Rose released numerous singles in 2016. In March 2017, Ariana and the Rose performed at the South by Southwest music festival and released her second EP titled Retrograde. Prior to the release, Ariana and the Rose released a song from the EP with the duo RKCB.

In addition to her live performances, Ariana and the Rose is known for her immersive experience "Light + Space". Partnering with venues like House of Yes, Public Hotels, and 3 Dollar Bill, Ariana has brought Light + Space all over the world.

In 2019, Ariana and the Rose released her 3rd EP, Constellations Phase 1. The EP gained critical acclaim from Billboard, NYLON, and The Huffington Post. In the summer of 2019, Ariana and the Rose toured parts of the US and played at Sacramento Pride, Milwaukee Summer Fest and Vans Warped Tour. Ariana and the Rose has toured extensively and shared the stage with artists like Lizzo, Allie X, Weathers, Foxes, Jack Garratt, Torres, and Cyndi Lauper. Other notable performances include sets at Bushwig Festival, Brighton Pride, Lovebox Festival, Latitude Festival, The Great Escape Festival, and SXSW.

The dance single "Every Body" was released in the summer of 2021. To accompany the release of the single, Ariana and the Rose filmed a music video that featured talent like Amanda Lepore, Kandy Muse, Cakes da Killa, CT Hedden, Ryan Burke, Merlot, Rify Royalty, Rhea Litre, Spencer Ludwig and more. The video was filmed at the House of Yes nightclub in New York City. Ariana performed her national US TV debut of "Every Body” on Full Frontal with Samantha Bee on February 3, 2022.

In 2021, Ariana and the Rose went viral on TikTok after posting her "piano chats", videos of herself giving positive affirmations while playing the piano.

DiLorenzo's single "Setting Me Free" released March 9, 2022, was released before her debut album, Lonely Hearts Club, that came out that summer.

In 2026, DiLorenzo released The Breakup Variety Hour, a project that was developed during the COVID-19 pandemic and her aforementioned piano chats.

== Discography ==
=== Albums ===
Title	Album details
Lonely Hearts Club	Released: July 29, 2022; Label: Pookiebird Music; Formats: Digital download

=== Extended plays ===
Title	EP details
Head vs Heart	Released: March 23, 2014; Label: Pookiebird Music; Formats: CD, digital download
Retrograde	Released: March 24, 2017; Label: Pookiebird Music; Formats: Digital download
Constellations Phase 1	Released: July 26, 2019; Label: Pookiebird Music; Formats: Digital download
Cosmic Lover (The Remixes)	Released: November 17, 2023; Label: Pookiebird Music; Formats: Digital download

=== Singles ===
==== As lead artist ====
Title	Year	Album / EP
When You Know, You Know	2013	Non-album single
Heartbeat	2014	Head vs Heart
In Your Bed	2014	Head vs Heart
Give Up the Ghost	2015	Non-album single
Survival of the Fittest	2016	Survival of the Fittest / Dirty Dancing
Dirty Dancing	2016	Survival of the Fittest / Dirty Dancing
Supercool	2016	Retrograde
Love You Lately (with RKCB)	2017	Retrograde
How Does That Make You Feel	2017	Retrograde
For Your Love	2017	Non-album single
Lonely Star	2018	Non-album single
Night Owl	2018	Non-album single
You Were Never My Boyfriend	2019	Constellations Phase 1
Bye Bye Bye	2019	Constellations Phase 1
True Love	2019	Constellations Phase 1
Every Body	2021	Lonely Hearts Club
London Boys (with Cakes da Killa)	2021	Lonely Hearts Club
Setting Me Free	2022	Lonely Hearts Club
Fuck Boy	2022	Lonely Hearts Club
Girl Who Comes Next	2023	Non-album single
Landed	2023	Non-album single

==== As featured artist ====
Artist	Title	Year	Album
Feenixpawl & Harley Knox (featuring Ariana and the Rose)	Bones	2018	Non-album single
Peter Verdell (featuring Ariana and the Rose)	It's a Good Life	2022	Non-album single
