= Fire-Eater =

Fire-Eater or fire eater may refer to:

- Fire eater, a performer who places flaming objects into their mouth and extinguishes them
- Fire Eater (album), an album by jazz saxophonist Rusty Bryant
- Fire-Eater (film), a 1998 Finnish film
- Fire-Eaters, extreme pro-slavery politicians in the 19th-century United States
- The Fire Eater, a 1921 American Western film
- "The Fire-Eater", an episode of the Japanese anime TV series Dragon Ball
- The Fire-Eaters, a 2003 children's novel by David Almond
- Mangiafuoco (Italian for "Fire-Eater"), a fictional character from Carlo Collodi's novel The Adventures of Pinocchio (1881-1883) and its various adaptations

== See also ==
- Fire eater's lung
