= Circus Amok =

New York City-based circus and theater troupe

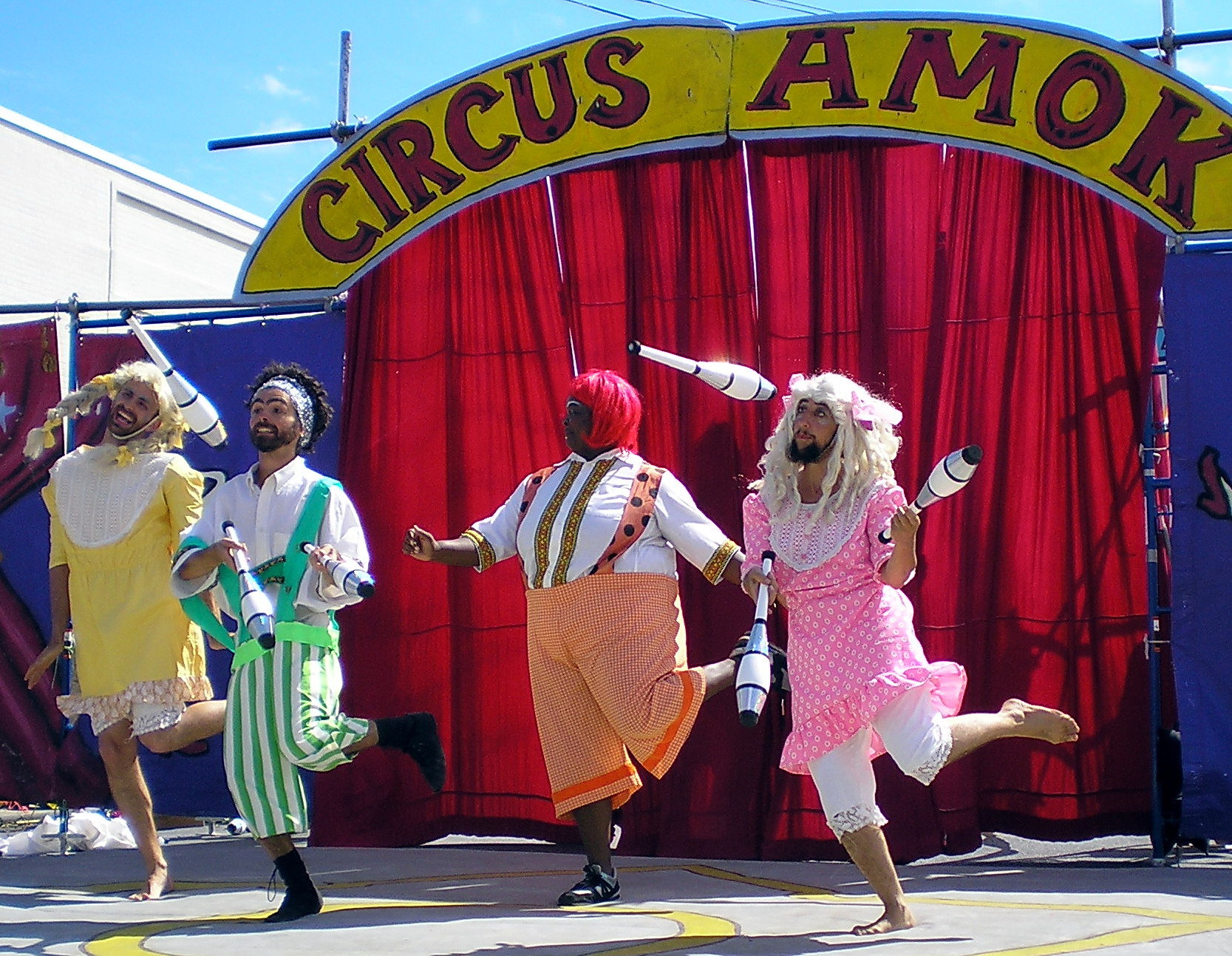
Clowns (including Jennifer Miller) juggling at Circus Amok in 2006.

Circus Amok is a New York City-based circus and theater troupe that produces free outdoor performances every year in the NYC parks. Founded in 1989 by performance artist Jennifer Miller, who directs the company, the troupe began touring the city parks annually in 1994. The company performs in small neighborhood parks and well-traveled public squares in Brooklyn, the Bronx, Manhattan and Queens. Circus Amok's performances address various political themes and social justice issues, which in recent years have included housing, health care, gentrification, gay marriage, immigration, the Department of Homeland Security, police brutality, police stop-and-frisk policies, and public education.

== History ==
Circus Amok started doing one-off performances at P.S. 122 in 1989, and began developing and performing free outdoor shows in 1994. They have regularly toured public parks in Manhattan, Brooklyn, Queens, and the Bronx since then.

Past shows:

- The Ozone Show (1989)
- Spies are Us (1990)
- The Survival Show (1991)
- I Am You, the Hypothalamus Story (1992)
- NY: Ground Under (1994)
- NY: Ground Under II (1995)
- $$$ Money Amok $$$ (1996)
- Quality of Life (1998)
- Quality of Life II (1999)
- Come And See For Yourselves! (2000)
- The Medicine Show (2001)
- The Experimental Walking Tour (2002)
- Home * Land * Security (2003)
- The Back to School Show (2004)
- Princess!: The Tail of a Lost City (2005)
- Citizen * Ship (2006)
- BeeDazzled! (2007)
- Sub-Prime Sublime (2008)
- MOO (2012)
- At the Crossroads (2014)
- Enough is Enough (2018)

== See also ==
- Lady Circus
