= Sharon Hayes (artist) =

American artist (born 1970)

- Born: 1970 (age 55–56); Baltimore, Maryland, U.S.
- Education: Bowdoin College, University of California, Los Angeles
- Website: shaze.info

Sharon Hayes is an American multimedia artist. She came to prominence as an artist and an activist during the East Village scene in the early '90s. She primarily works with video, installation, and performance as her medium. Using multimedia, she "appropriates, rearranges, and remixes in order to revitalize spirits of dissent". Hayes's work addresses themes such as romantic love, activism, queer theory, and politics. Hayes works to develop "new representational strategies that examine and interrogate the present political movement, not as a moment without historical foundation but as one that reaches simultaneously backwards and forwards." She incorporates texts from found speeches, recordings, songs, letters, and her own writing into her practice that she describes as “a series of performatives rather than performance.”

== Biography ==
Hayes studied anthropology at Bowdoin College in Brunswick, Maine, and performance art at the Trinity/La Mama Performing Arts Program in New York in the early 1990s. She participated in the Independent Study Program at the Whitney Museum of American Art from 1999 to 2000, and received an MFA in interdisciplinary studies from the University of California, Los Angeles in 2003. She is an associate professor of Fine Arts at the University of Pennsylvania.

== Work ==
=== In the Near Future (2005–2008) ===
In the Near Future was created through four iterations staged in London, New York, Vienna, and Warsaw, with additional performances in Brussels and Paris. In each iteration, Hayes stood on the street each day for a number of days with a different protest sign. The slogans were mostly culled from past protests, although a few speak to the possibility of a future demonstration.

New York, 2005: Commissioned by Art in General, curated by Sofía Hernández Chong Cuy.

Vienna, 2006: Presented as part of Wieder und Wider: Performance Appropriated, MUMOK, curated by Barbara Clausen and Achim Hochdorfer.

Warsaw, 2008: Museum of Modern Art in Warsaw, curated by Monika Szczukowska.

London, 2008: Presented as part of Perplexed in Public, curated by Elena Crippa and Silvia Sgualdini.

=== Everything Else Has Failed! Don’t You Think It’s Time for Love? (2007) ===
Presented by Art in General for their 25th anniversary exhibition, in downtown Manhattan, Everything Else Has Failed! Don’t You Think It’s Time for Love? Hayes performed a series of works in front of the UBS Building. Dressed up as a queer office temp, she recited a love letter to an through a microphone and speaker on the street, expressing that "I didn't want the love to be read as heteronormative. Yet I want to be clear that queerness is not some kind of idealized space of politics." The speeches were also recorded and played in the lobby of the UBS building alongside a series of silk-screened works inspired by political posters from the 1960s and 70s.

=== Revolutionary Love 1 & 2 (2008) ===
For Revolutionary Love 1 & 2, Hayes asked about 100 queer volunteers to recite a text she wrote on gay power and liberation at the 2008 presidential conventions as part of a two-part commission for Creative Time’s public art initiative, “Democracy in America: The National Campaign”, curated by Nato Thompson. Subtitled, I Am Your Worst Fear for the Democratic National Convention in Denver, CO and I Am Your Best Fantasy, the Republican National Convention in St. Paul, MN, the participants recited each ten to twenty minutes long text three times over the course of two hours. Using the charged atmosphere of the conventions as a backdrop for a more personal reflection on love and politics, the piece drew upon the history of the gay liberation movements of the 1970s.

=== Parole (2010) ===
Parole is a four-channel video installation composed of semi-autonomous video “scenes” that string together to form a narrative without a story. Focused on a central character who records sound but never speaks, Parole teases out multiple relationships between politics and desire, intimacy and estrangement, speaking and listening, voice and body. The installation is composed of footage of performed events in New York, London, Frankfurt, and Istanbul, Turkey, as well as staged footage of this sound recorder in various private and semi-public locations.

=== Fingernails on a blackboard: Bella (2014) ===
Fingernails on a blackboard: Bella investigates how voice acts as the embodied medium of speech and addresses the political consequences of gender and the specific limitations of power, communication, and relatability in the specter of public speech. The work takes the 1977 National Women's Conference in Houston, TX, as a historical point of departure, which was a result of an executive order to assess the status of women, in light of the United Nations proclaiming 1975 as International Women's Year. Following the well-attended, highly publicized event, an extension was granted for the ratification of the Equal Rights Amendment. But having only been ratified by 35 states by the 1982 deadline, the amendment never passed. The video work uses the transcript of a meeting between politician Bella Abzug – the New York Congresswoman head of the National Women's Conference – and her vocal coach. During their meeting, the pair work at neutralizing Abzug's regional accent and softening her tone – strategically altering her voice to something more universal and soothing.

=== In My Little Corner of the World, Anyone Would Love You (2016) ===
In In My Little Corner of the World, Anyone Would Love You, Hayes investigates queer and feminist archives in the US and the UK documenting gay liberation, women's liberation, as well as the pre-lesbian liberation movements: Daughters of Bilitis (US) and Minorities Research Group (UK). Hayes explores the specific limits of gender, the anti-racist work done by lesbian, queer, and trans people of color to combat racism in white lesbian feminist groups and the historic and contemporary ways in which feminist, lesbian, and queer political collectivities have expanded and constrained gender expression. The work was exhibited at The Common Guild in Glasgow and Studio Voltaire in London in 2016.

=== If They Should Ask (2017) ===
If They Should Ask was a temporary monument located in Philadelphia's Rittenhouse Square addressing the lack of monuments dedicated to the women who have contributed to the social, cultural, political and economic life of Philadelphia. Of the hundreds of sculptures in the city that honor historic figures, only two are dedicated to women. If They Should Ask is a collection of concrete pedestals of existing monuments in the city cast at half-scale and engraved with the names of Philadelphia-area women who have contributed to the city's civic and public life from the mid-1600s to the present day. The piece was created as a part of Monument Lab, a Philadelphia-wide public art and history initiative.

=== Ricerche: Two (2020) ===
Through the film, Ricerche: two, Sharon Hayes encapsulates the politics of gender, sex, and sexuality in the United States by interviewing two women's tackle-football teams. Hayes’ “Ricerche” film series is based on the 1964 Italian film “Comizi d’amore,” by director Pier Paolo Pasolini. Drawing inspiration from Pasolini’s filmmaking style of cinéma verité, Hayes includes unscripted dialogue and non-professional actors. Hayes takes a slightly different approach by centering the interview on the subjects, rather than taking full control over the production, to ensure authenticity. By interviewing the Arlington Impact and the Dallas Elite Mustangs, Hayes explores the experiences of a group of women who are occupying public spaces in a non-heteronormative way by playing organized women’s tackle football. The tackle football players express the social and financial obstacles they face with playing professional women’s football, such as relying on some other form of employment during the season to afford paying membership fees, equipment, and travel costs. The simple act of playing on the team breaks gendered limitations enforced on women. In Hayes' work, the artist acknowledges a larger political context when conducting her interviews to encourage conversation about gender and politics in the United States.

=== Ricerche: Four (2024) ===
In her latest work as part of her ongoing multipart series Ricerche, Sharon Hayes interviews a group of gay, lesbian, queer, and trans elders. Ricerche: four explores the group's personal lives and political views, highlighting the power and persistence of chosen community and what it means to gather amidst the ongoing pandemic and the impact of social media.

== Exhibitions ==
- 2007: I march in the parade of liberty, but as long as I love you I'm not free, organized by Massimiliano Gioni, New Museum for Contemporary Art (New York)
- 2010: Museo Nacional Centro de Arte Reina Sofia (Madrid)
- 2011: focus: Sharon Hayes, The Art Institute of Chicago, Chicago
- 2011: In The Near Future, Contemporary Art Gallery, Vancouver
- 2012: Sharon Hayes: There's so much I want to say to you, The Whitney Museum of American Art (New York)
- 2012: Stage Presence: Theatricality in Art and Media, San Francisco Museum of Modern Art (San Francisco, CA)
- 2012: Sharon Hayes, The Frances Young Tang Teaching Museum and Art Gallery, Saratoga Springs, New York
- 2013: Venice Biennale
- 2014: Sharon Hayes: Loudspeakers and Other Forms of Listening, curated by Heather Anderson, Carleton University Art Gallery, Ottawa
- 2015: Black Box: Sharon Hayes, Baltimore Museum of Art, Maryland

== Awards ==
Hayes was the 2013 visual arts recipient of the Alpert Awards in the Arts, given annually to five "risk-taking, mid-career" artists by the Herb Alpert foundation and the California Institute of the Arts. The same year, the jury of the 55th Venice Biennale awarded Hayes a special mention for her video 'Ricerche: three', 2013. Inspired by Italian filmmaker and writer Pier Paolo Pasolini's 1963 documentary Love Meetings, Hayes interviewed 35 students at an all-women's college in western Massachusetts about sexuality, speaking to "a larger way in which we form ourselves as people in relation to collectives". In 2014, Hayes received the John Simon Guggenheim Memorial Foundation Creative Arts Fellowship.

== Selected publications ==
=== By the artist ===
- Sharon Hayes, Lena Essling, Ann-Sofi Noring, Echo, Koenig Books, London, 2019. ISBN 9783960985983
- Sharon Hayes, Chrissie Iles, Sharon Hayes: There's So Much I Want to Say to You, Whitney Museum of American Art, New York, 2012. ISBN 9780300180374

=== On the artist ===
- Julia Bryan-Wilson, Jeannine Tang, Lanka Tattersall, Sharon Hayes, Phaidon, London, 2018. ISBN 9780714873466
