= Lady Circus =

Performing arts troupe in New York City

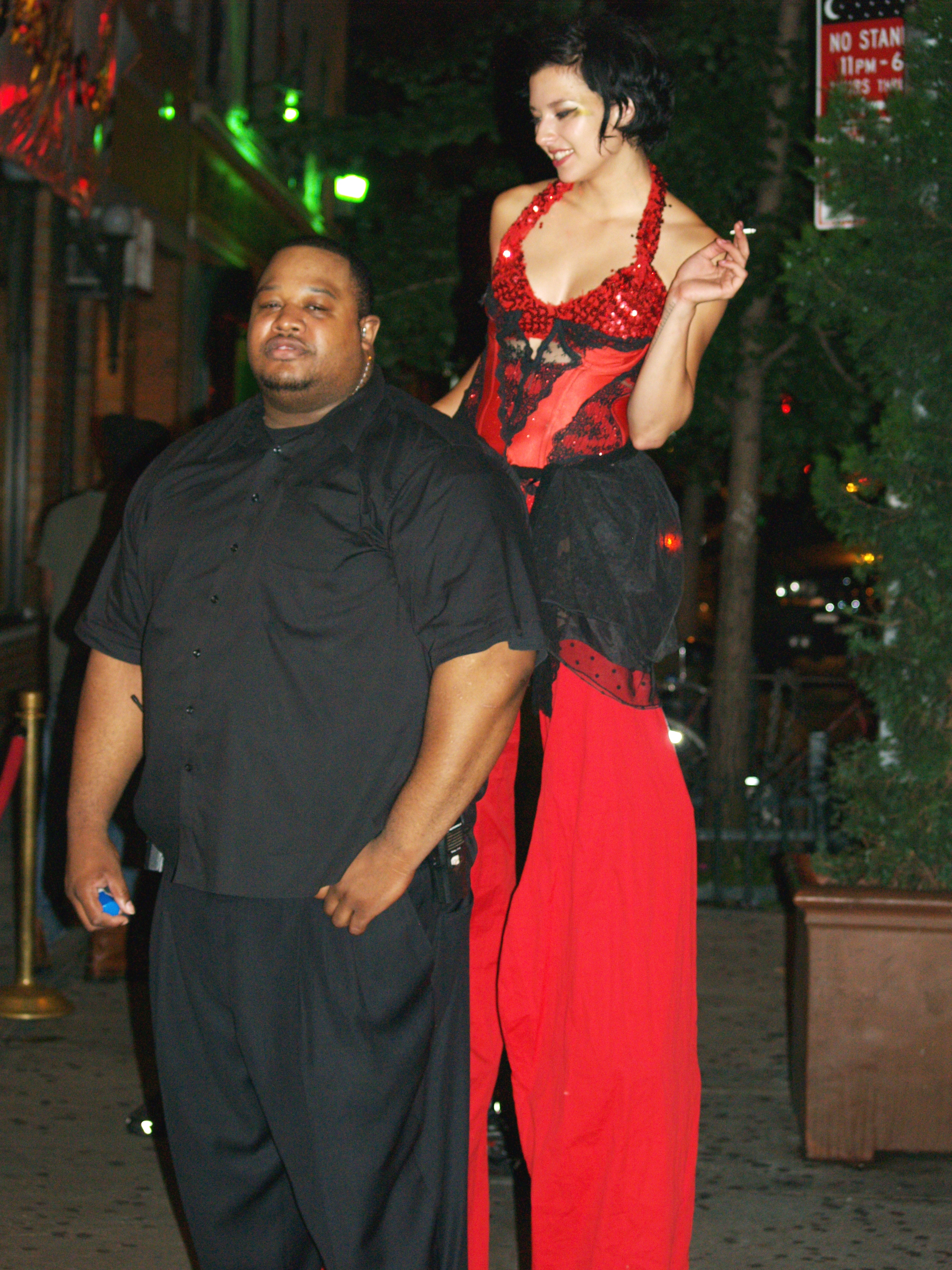
- Anya Sapozhnikova with a doorman on Avenue B in New York City.

Origin
- Country: United States
- Founder(s): Anya Sapozhnikova
- Year founded: 2007

Information
- Website: ladycircus.com

Lady Circus is a performing arts troupe in New York City composed of eight ladies who perform solo, in small groups, or in a variety show setting in their entirety. The troupe was founded by Anya Sapozhnikova in New York in 2007.

Lady Circus, self-described as "an intoxicating cocktail of riot and glamour," considers themselves to be, "a mix of sideshow, brooklyn grit, and 1920s gilded decadence finished off with a modern edge." Their performances use circus arts to entertain and address political and social issues. Members have been sighted using stilts, hula hoops, fire fans, poi, aerial silk, lyra, trapeze, contortion, glass walking, sword swallowing, fire eating, rhythmic gymnastics and combinations thereof across a variety of venues including warehouse parties, galas, benefits, parades, art openings, and private events presenting a diverse skill-set.

Lady Circus also participates in, and at times hosts, "circus skill share." Circus skill share is a free community effort where performers gather in a public place with their performance tools and share their knowledge and skills with people of the community and with each other. Teaching circus to children and adults that otherwise may not have exposure or opportunity to experience circus arts and providing fun opportunities to improve body strength, coordination, and balance.

== Performers ==
- Anya Sapozhnikova
- Jordann Baker
- Kae Burke
- Claire de Luxe
- Ali Schmitz aka Ali Luminescent
- Ellie Mio
- Cassandra Siegler
- Stephanie Radia
- Vena Von Cava
- Lori Barber
- Ashley Perez

== History ==
Lady Circus performed traditionally one gig at a time, tailoring their acts to each performance space and purpose. As their rehearsal space at the House of YES was rebuilt after a devastating fire in April 2008, their ability to create a full stage show came to fruition.

The members of Lady Circus are often hired to perform at sophisticated Manhattan nightclubs, Macy's Thanksgiving Day Parade, concerts, large summer festivals, and corporate events. They also performed in warehouse parties around Brooklyn.

In January 2009, Lady Circus completed its first full stage production for The Sky Box Aerial Theatre that operates at the new House of YES. The show was titled "Lady Circus and The Mickey Western Band Present: The Rusted Gun Saloon", and it was a tumultuous tale of love, jealousy, greed, and violence including live music and circus. The show was directed and produced as a collaborative piece between Lady Circus, Lauren Larken of Artistic Evolution, and The Mickey Western Band.

In May 2009, Lady Circus collaborated with FUCT to produce its second full stage production, "Cirque du Quoi?!?", a twisted tale with acrobatics and sexual humor. The show was directed by Jeff Glaser.

June 2009: Lady Circus joined the Bonnaroo Buskers in Manchester Tennessee for daily parades and a midnight variety show.

October 2009: Lady Circus teamed up with the creatrix of Desert Sin and the Mystery Bird Puppet Theatre to perform "Twitchers" A theatrical immersion of dance, puppetry, aerial, live music, spectacle, and pure emotion. A tour of birds, dreams, and women who take flight.

November 2009: Members of Lady Circus entertained at the New York MoMA Film Benefit : A tribute to Tim Burton

December 2009: House of Yes Christmas Spectacular : Lady Circus and Friends. A festive, in-your-face holiday extravaganza! Overflowing with glitter, glamour, sex, comedy, matching costumes, synchronized dancing, and theatrics. Guest appearances include but not limited to Desert Sin Dance Company, The Love Show, Jenny Rocha and the Painted Ladies, Mike Richter, Graham Skipper of FUCT, Kayti Bunny, Pearl Pistol, and Band of Bicycles.

February 2010: Members of Lady Circus partook in "The Wonderneath" a magical circus theatre adventure written and produced by Ali Schmitz and featuring Jordann Baker, Claire de Luxe, Ellie Mio, and joined by Kai Altair and Ateles Aerial. Music was performed by Tin Pan.

May 2010: "The Horror Show"

October 2010: Kae Burke of Lady Circus wrote, produced, and starred in "The Circus of Circus" a dramatic comedy based on George Orwells "Animal Farm"

== Collaborators with Lady Circus ==
- Lauren Larken
- Justin Lange
- Aaron Goldsmith
- Justin Aubuchon
- Akim Funk Buddha
- Mickey Western
