= Trinity/La MaMa Performing Arts Program =

- Established: 1986
- Founders: Judy Dworin, Leonardo Shapiro
- Parent institution: Trinity College (Connecticut), Office of Study Away
- Affiliations: La MaMa Experimental Theatre Club
- Director: Barbara Karger
- Location: La MaMa Rehearsal Studios, New York City
- Website: www.trinitylamama.org

The Trinity/La MaMa Performing Arts Program is a fall semester study away program of Trinity College based at the La MaMa Experimental Theatre Club in New York City. The program is part of the Trinity College Office of Study Away, with students from various other liberal arts colleges enrolled in the program every year. Undergraduate students take classes and workshops that vary across all topics of interdisciplinary art, including acting, dance, performance art, puppetry, site-specific theatre, playwriting, directing, and media-based performance. Each student works at an internship/field study in an arts organization twice a week. Students also attend 3-4 shows a week in all disciplines of performance. Throughout the semester, students create and showcase original pieces, with a final performance presented at La MaMa Experimental Theatre Club and at Trinity College in Hartford, CT.

The Trinity/La MaMa office and classes take place at the La MaMa Rehearsal Studios. The students are housed at the 92nd Street Y. The program has admitted students from dozens of colleges throughout the country since its inception.

== Background ==
In 1983, the theater and dance departments of Trinity College were combined to create one Theater & Dance department. Spear headed by Trinity professor and La MaMa artist, Judy Dworin, this change provided a platform for the development of Trinity/La MaMa.

In 1985, Dworin, along with Leonardo Shapiro, director/founder of the Shaliko Company, brought a group of Trinity students to visit New York City to explore the downtown performance scene and museums. The trip's primary goal was to expose the Theater & Dance students to the booming emergence of the multi-disciplinary landscape of New York.

From the success of this first visit, along with Dworin and Shapiro's artistic affiliations with La MaMa and La MaMa founder Ellen Stewart's passion towards education in the performing arts, Trinity/La MaMa celebrated its first semester in 1986.

=== 1986 – early 1990s ===
From 1986 to 1992, Shapiro acted as Program Director. During this period, the program hosted many guest artists to teach the students, including Ping Chong, Bill Irwin, Steve Paxton, Cecil McKinnon, Nina Martin, Eiko & Koma, Anne Bogart, Cathy Weis, Yoshiko Chuma, The Living Theatre, and Robbie McCauley. Specialty classes included voice, physical theatre, acting and text, kinetic awareness, piano, and the following dance forms: modern dance, jazz, ballet, African dance, Flamenco dance, and contact improvisation.

The program took a hiatus in 1993. In its place was a summer program led by Bulgarian theater director, Damyan Popchristov, in collaboration with the Nikitsky Gate Theater and Trinity College. This summer program would continue until 1999.

=== 1994–2005 ===
Trinity/La MaMa made its return in fall of 1994, with Damyan Popchristov as Artistic Director, and Chris Andersson as Administrative Director. The program would continue to work with guest artists for ongoing classes and workshops, including Lenora Champagne, Olga Lebedeva, Lisa Race, Patricia Hoffbauer, Maureen Fleming, Claire Porter, Jonathan Hart Makwaia, Lynn Moffat, Tiffany Mills, Joan MacIntosh, and Jonah Emsig.

From 2000 to 2001, upon Popchristov's departure from the program, performance artist George Emilio Sanchez took on the role as interim Artistic Director.

From 2001 to 2005, interdisciplinary performance artist Roberto Sifuentes took on the role of Artistic Director. In 2001, the Trinity/La MaMa Advisory Board was established, containing faculty members from Trinity College, Amherst College, Brown University, Oberlin College, and Ohio University.

==== Spring semesters ====
From 2004 to 2005, the program had both a spring semester and a fall semester. The spring semester was a notably different format. With its focus on solo performance, independent rehearsal, and field studies geared more towards apprenticeships, the spring semester had a class size between 3-5 students. Upon the departure of Sifuentes in 2006, the program returned to a fall-only program.

=== 2006–2017 ===
In 2006, performance artist Michael Burke became Program Director. During his time as director, the program went through various changes. From 2006 to 2012, the semester was referred to as the Trinity/La MaMa Urban Arts Semester. In 2009, the program was absorbed into the Trinity College Office of Study Away, departing from its history being under the umbrella of the Theater and Dance Department.

A new docket of guest artists and instructors became involved with the program, including Tim Miller, Peter Sciscioli, Peculiar Works Project, Lindsey Dietz Marchant, Alexandra Beller, Josh Moser, Juliana Francis, Grace Kiley, Federico Restrepo and Loco7, Snezhana Chernova, Jason Trucco, and Pablo Vela, amongst many others.

=== 2018–present ===
In 2018, Trinity college associate professor and director Barbara Karger became Program Director. The program most recently incorporated formatted workshops by Tectonic Theater Project and Anne Bogart Viewpoints with SITI Company. Most recent guest artist workshop collaborations include Trojan Women from the Great Jones Repertory Company, Lake Simons, and Jennifer Miller.

== Structure ==
The program has five components to its structure:

- Creation and performance of original work
- Ongoing classes with core instructors in voice, movement, and acting
- Ongoing workshops in various disciplines
- Weekly attendance of 3-4 performances
- Twice a week internship/field study placement with an arts organization, individual artist, or theater company

== Notable alumni ==
Trinity/La MaMa students of note include Golden Globe nominated actress Piper Perabo, two-time Emmy Award winner and documentary filmmaker Dyllan McGee, Broadway playwright and director Stephen Belber, poet, playwright and director Kit Ex, Obie Award and Lucille Lortel Award-winning playwright Nilaja Sun, Obie Award and Drama Desk Award-winning playwright and actor Ryan Haddad, and multimedia artist Sharon Hayes.
