= Fire breathing (circus act) =

Using fuel to create fire from the mouth

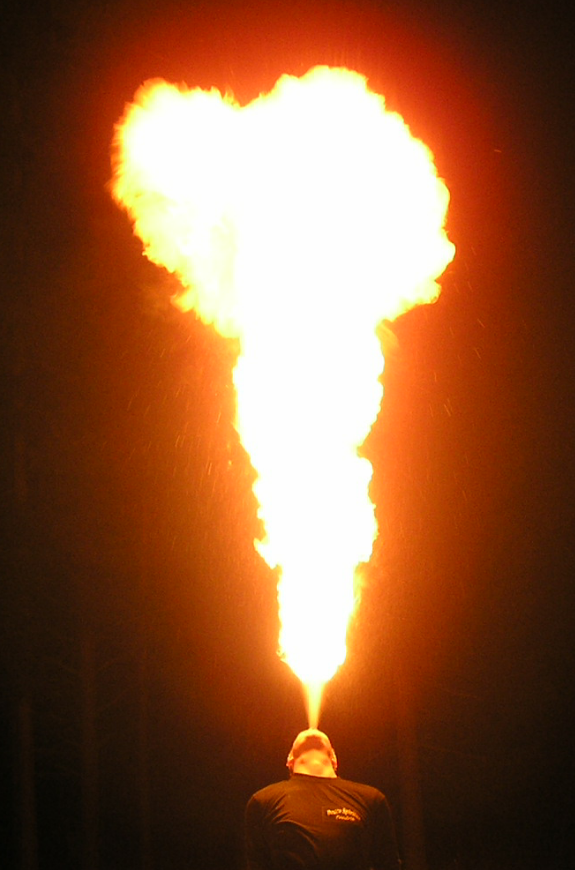
Fire breathing Guinness world record holder Fredrik Karlsson doing "The dragon's breath"

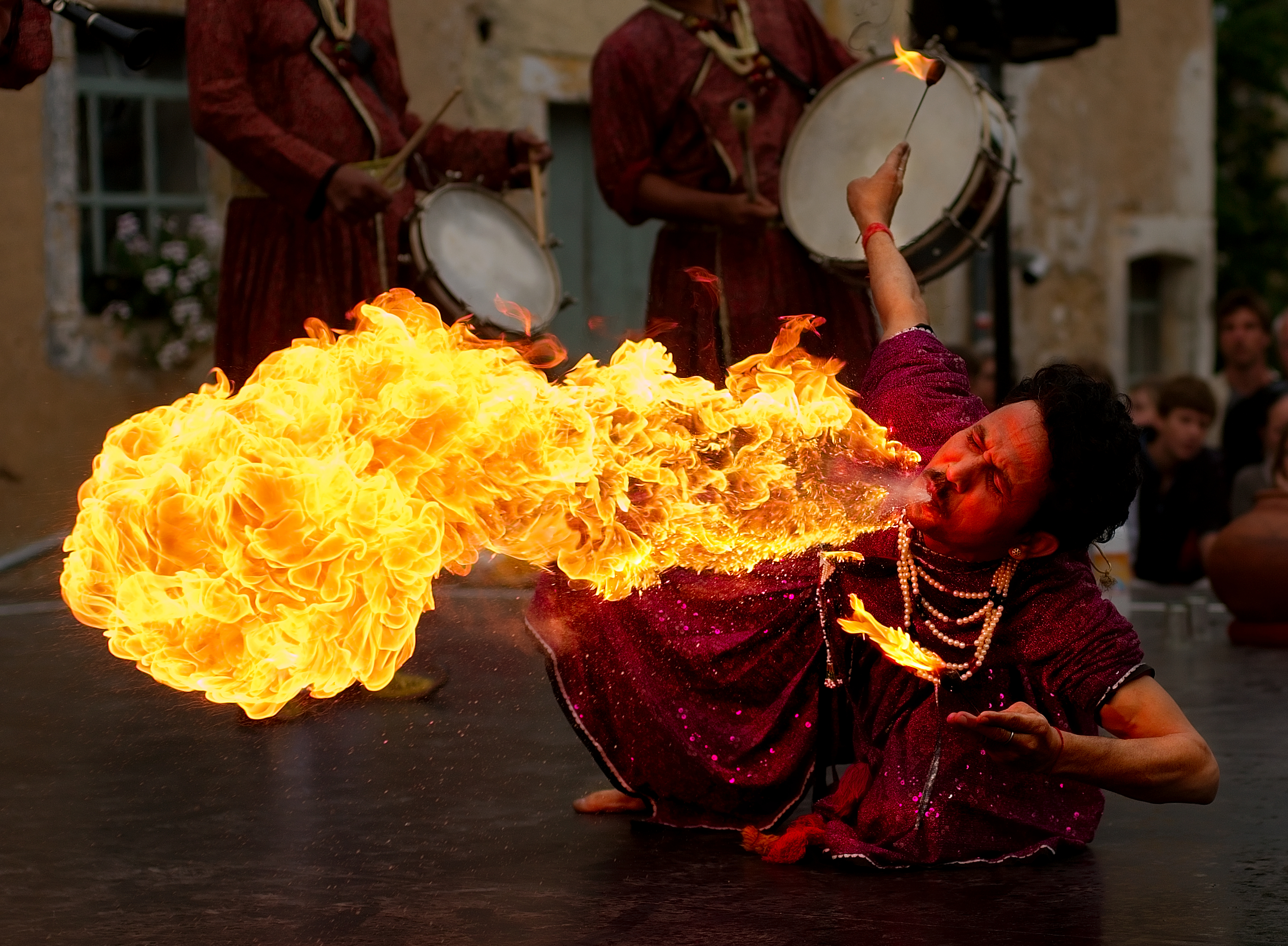
Fire breathing

A Jester fire breathing in slow motion

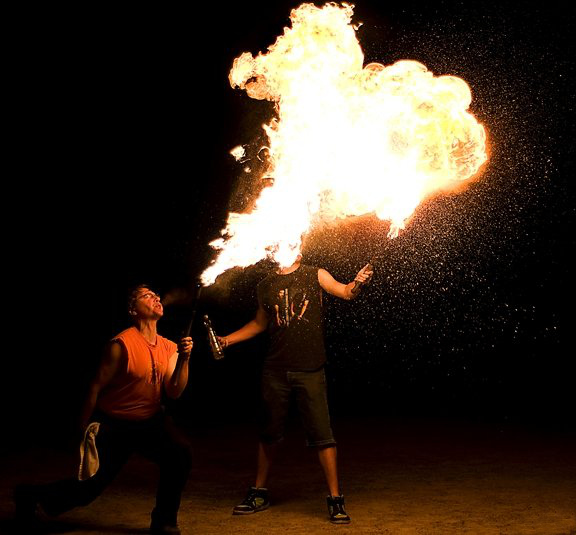
Dragon's breath, where the fire breather continues to feed a full-sized flame

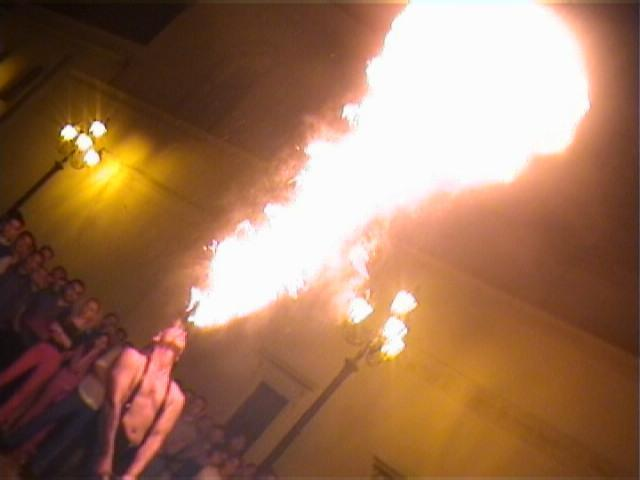
Street performer fire breathing

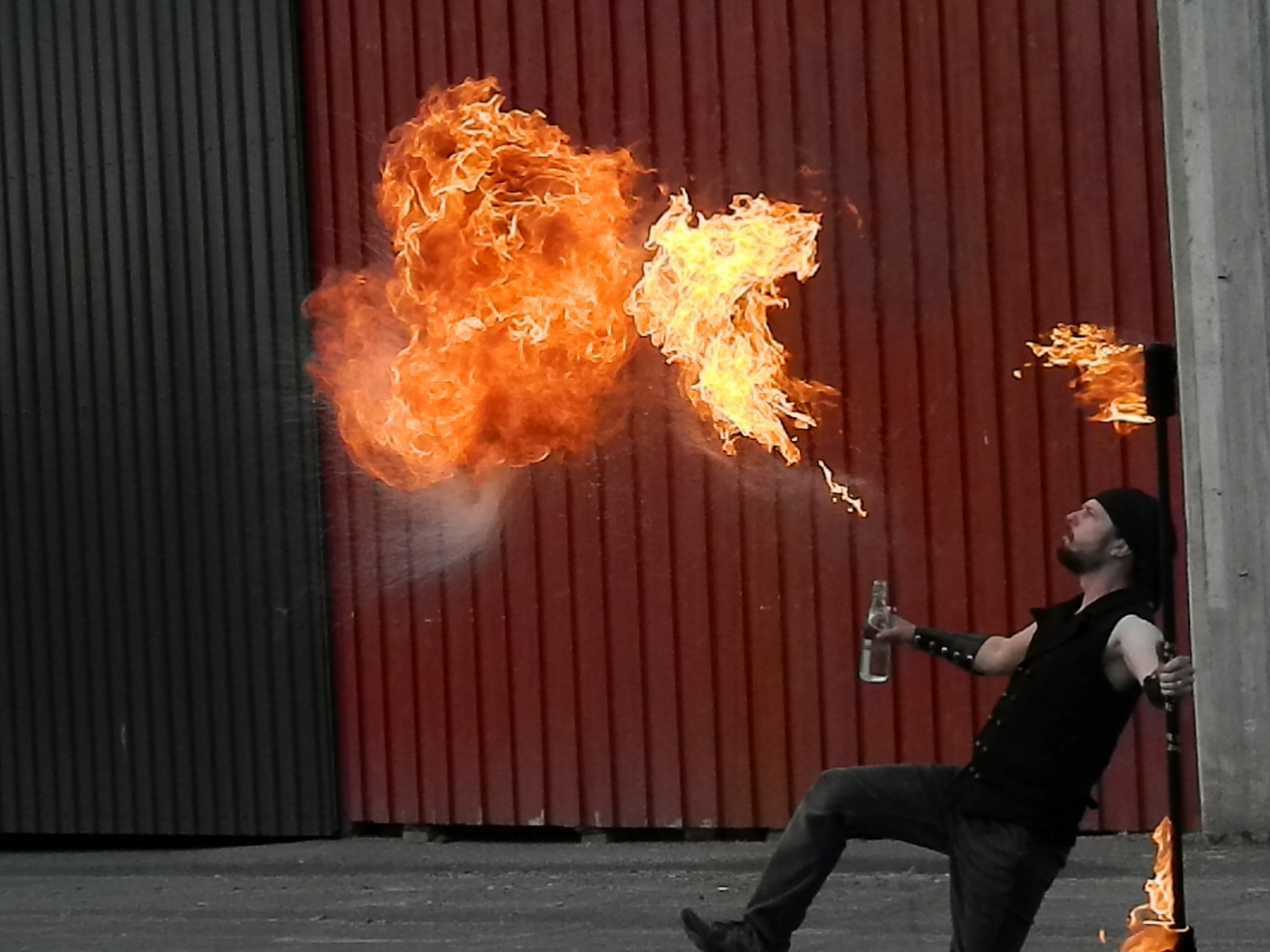
Fire breather

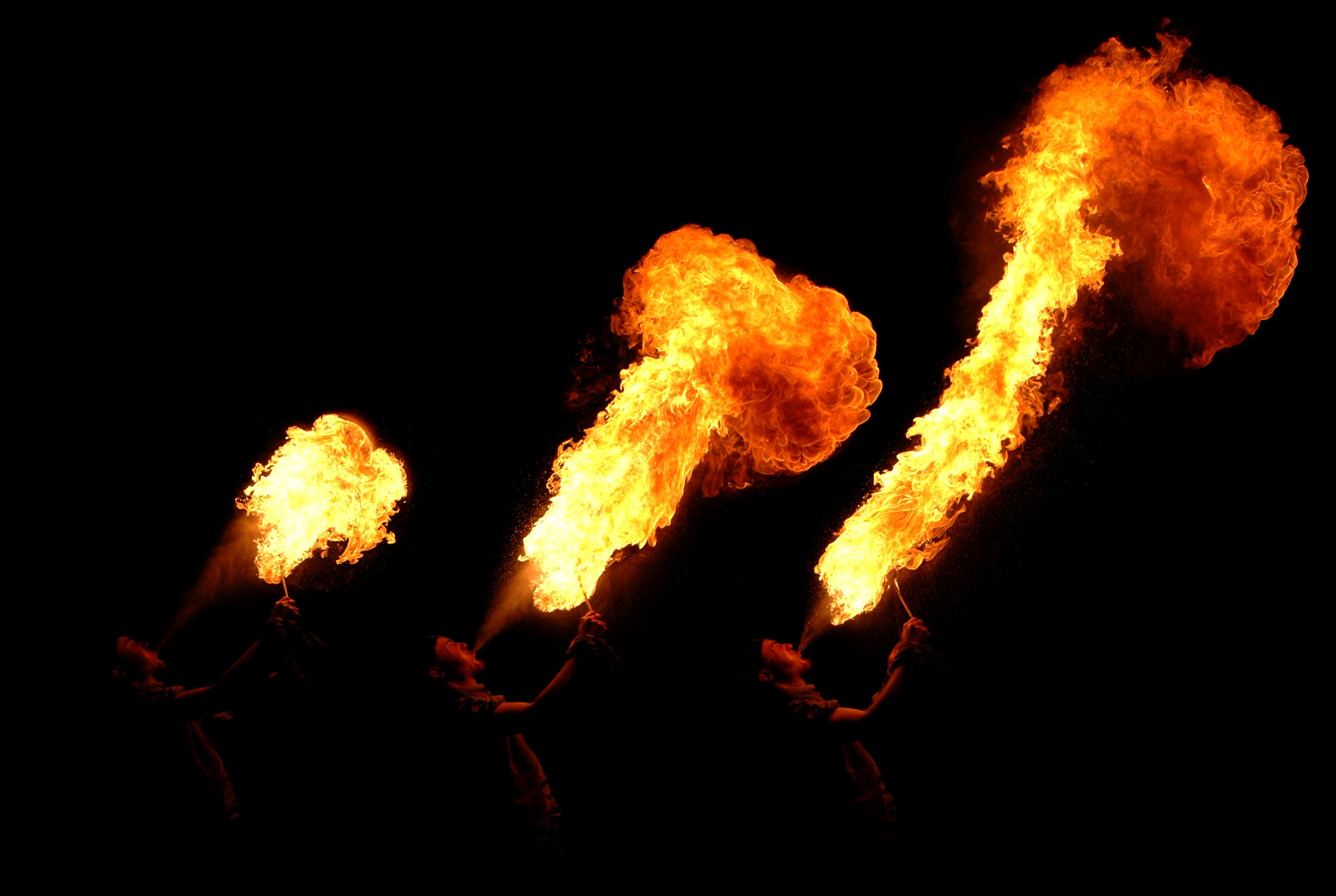
Time-lapse composite of a breath of fire

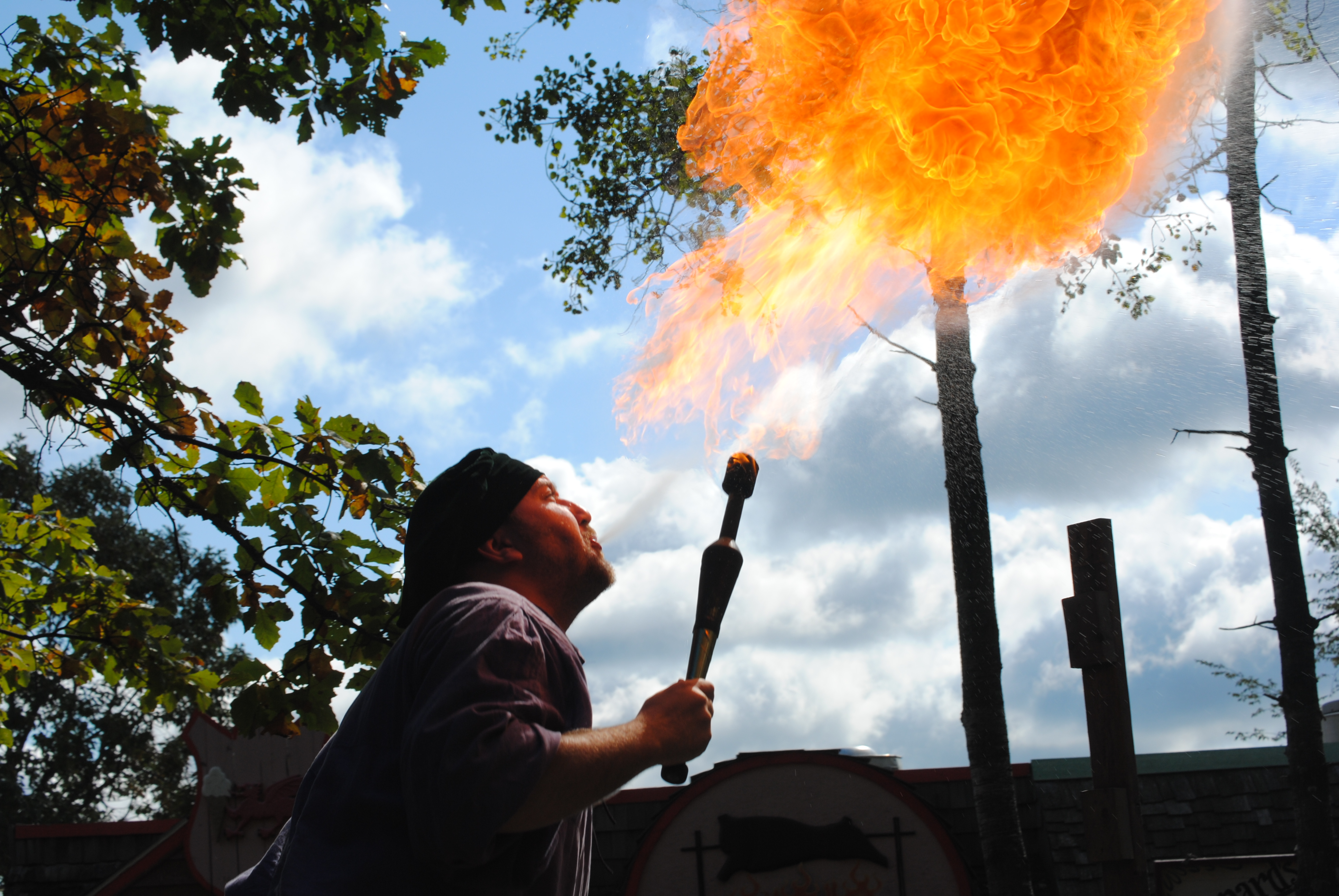
Fire breath

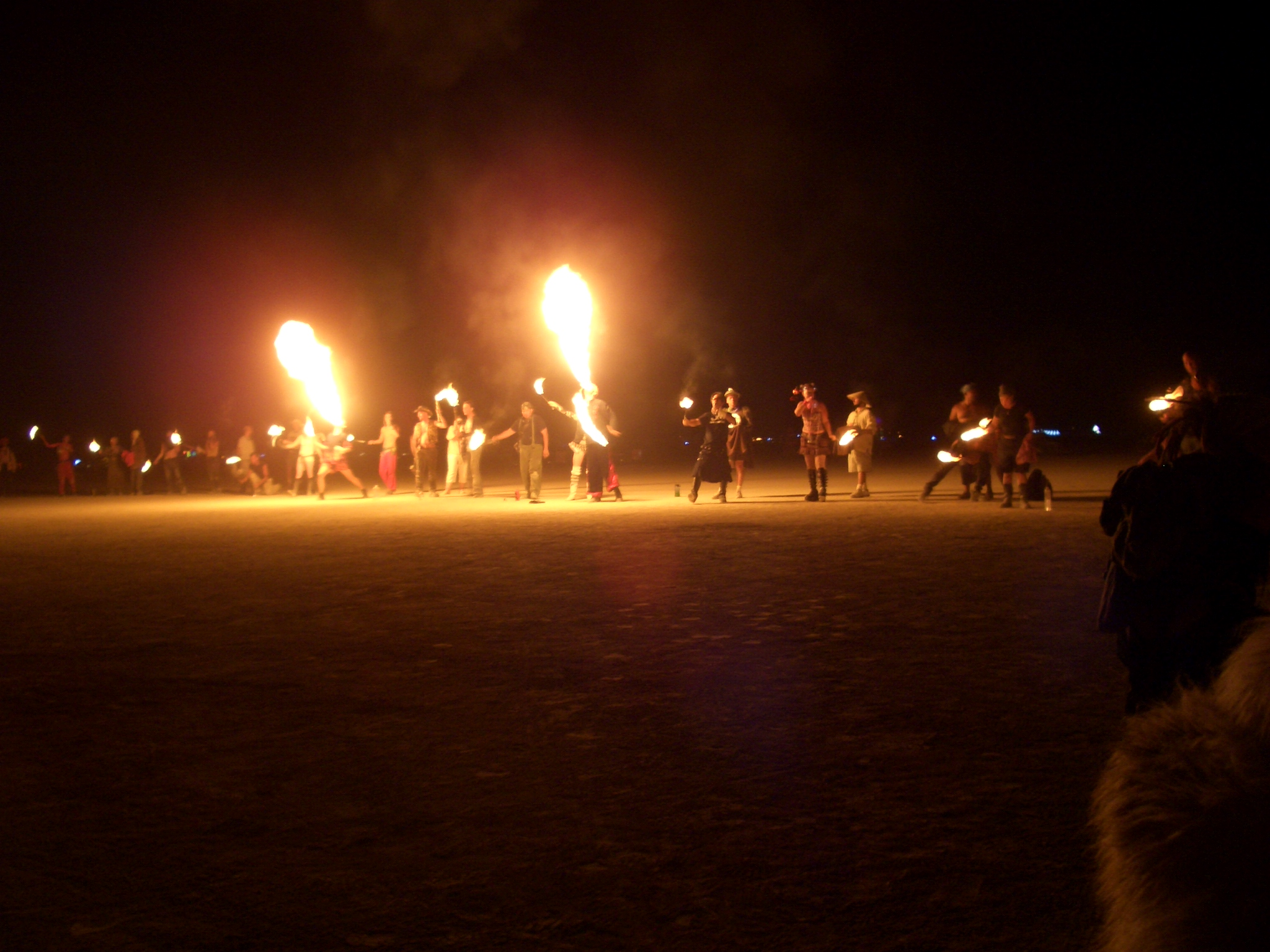
65 fire breathers perform simultaneously at Burning Man 2005

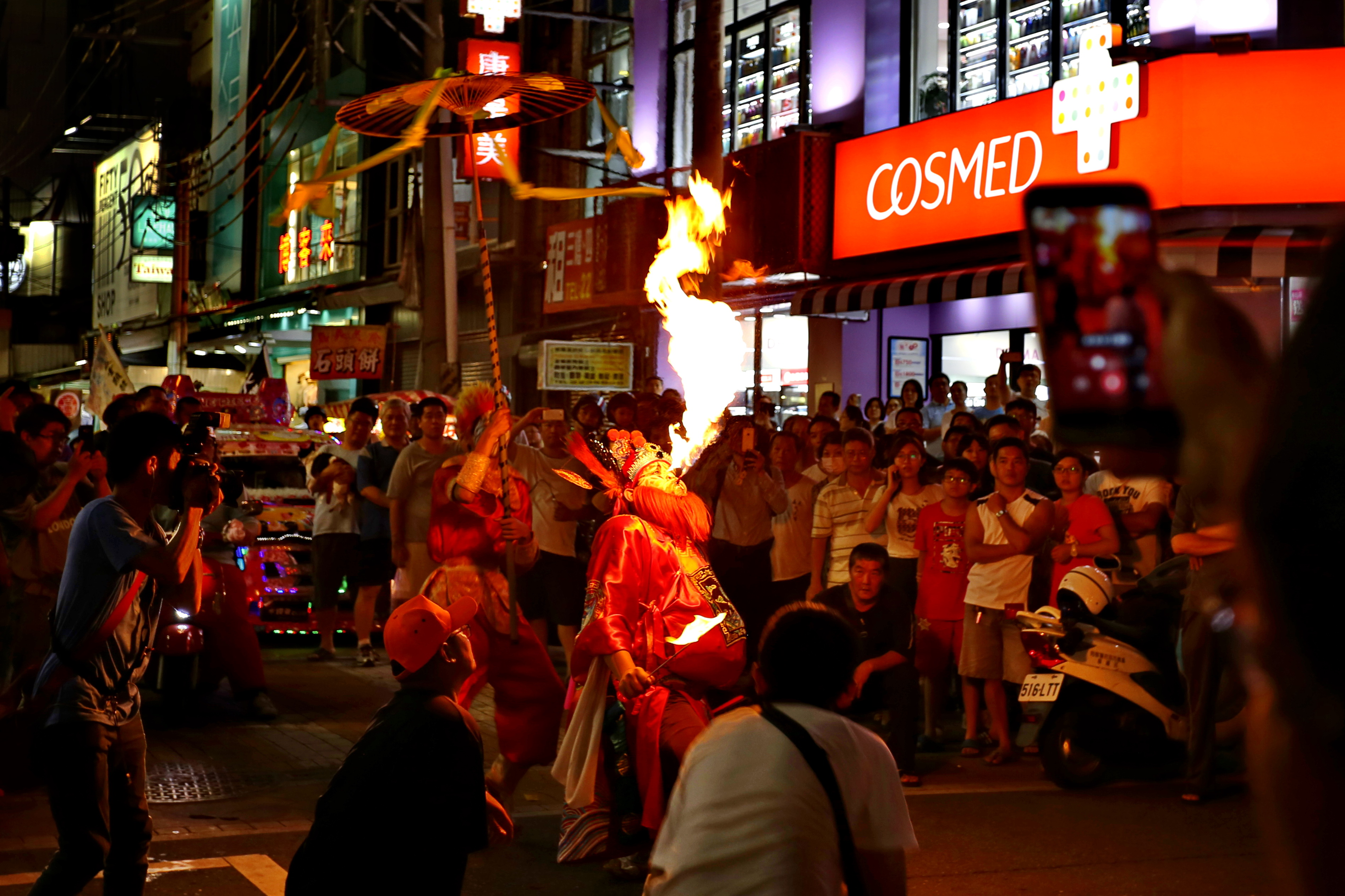
Fire breathing performance in a Ba-Jia-Jiang (the Eight Infernal Generals) parade in Taiwan

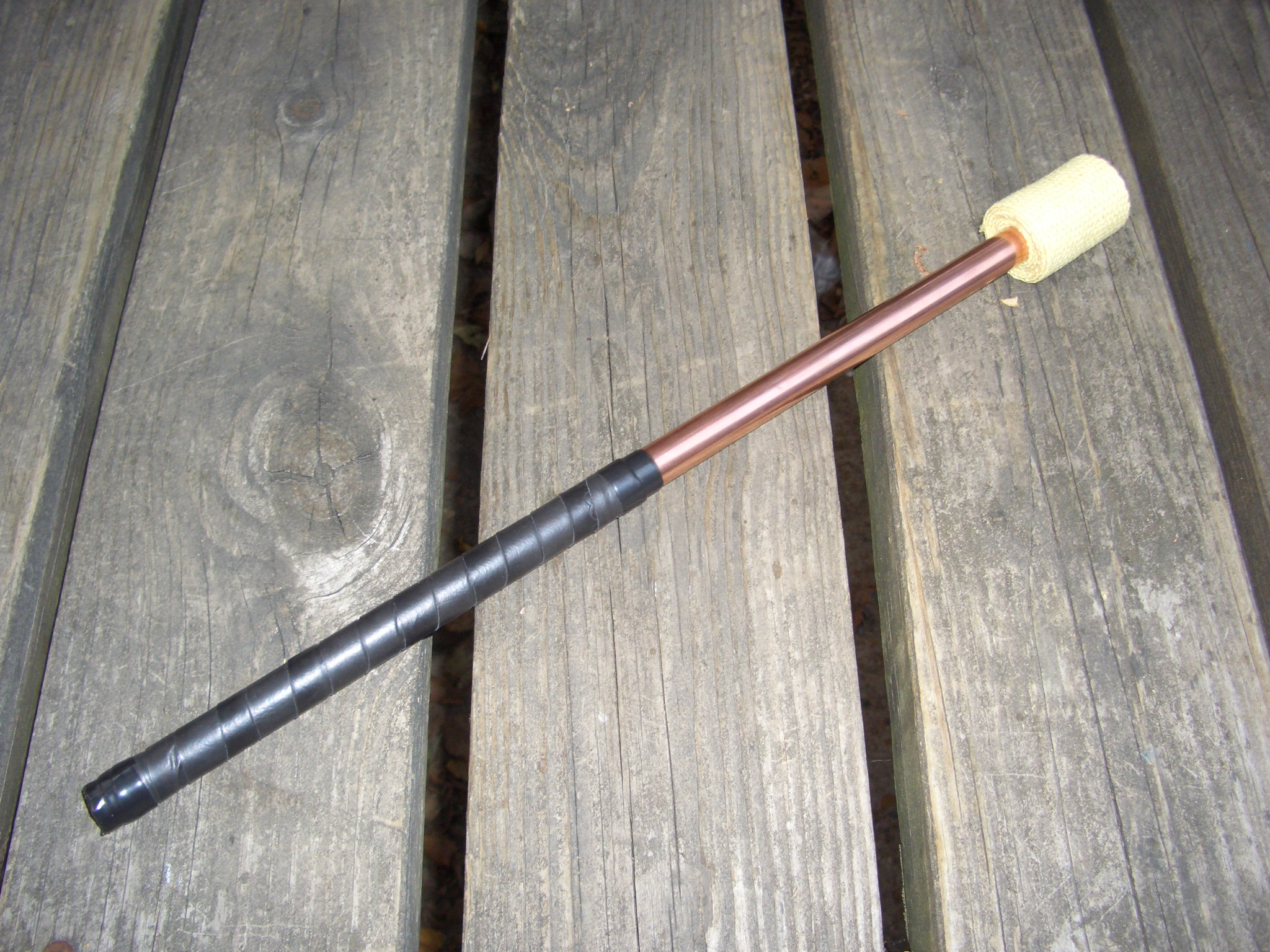
A simple fire breathing torch

Fire breathing is the act of making a plume or stream of fire by creating a precise mist of fuel from the mouth over an open flame. Regardless of the precautions taken, it is always a dangerous activity, but the proper technique and the correct fuel reduces the risk of injury or death.

== Performance ==
Fire breathing is performed by both professionals and non-professionals. Professional fire breathers usually incorporate the fire performance skill within a show where other fire skills are performed. The element of danger in performing fire breathing and other fire skills enhances the entertainment spectacle for many audience members.

== Training ==
The vast majority of professional fire-breathers are apprenticed by a seasoned professional and it is strongly recommended that teaching oneself be avoided due to the extreme risks. Most people who are taught fire breathing and eating skills are seasoned performers in their own right and are taught under the condition that the skills not be passed on until they become a recognised fire performer. Virtually all recorded incidents of serious injury by fire breathing involve untrained individuals, often while under the influence of alcohol. Using an incorrect fuel is usually a strong contributing factor.

== Health and safety ==
Performing with fire has many inherent risks to the health and safety of the practitioners. Fire breathing has a wider range of risks due to the required technique to create the effect. Having an actively spotting trained safety assistant with an appropriate fire blanket and fire extinguisher is an appropriate best practice when fire breathing and is a mandatory clause in most insurance policies for professional fire breathers.

=== Fuels ===
To increase safety, fire breathers must avoid highly flammable fuels such as alcohol, spirit-based fuels, and most petrochemicals, instead using safer combustibles with a higher flash point (>50 °C). Due to its relatively safe (≈90 °C) flash point, paraffin, or highly purified lamp oil, is the preferred fuel for fire breathing. Although corn starch has been cited as a non-toxic fuel, the hazards of inhalation increase the potential risk of lung infections.

Fuels that are considered especially dangerous include:

- Ethanol can be absorbed into the blood stream without drinking. Thus attempting fire breathing with ethanol can cause intoxication.
- Methanol (used with many colored flame recipes) has a variety of entry vectors and can cause blindness or neurological disorders.
- Very low flash point fuels like naphtha, butane, and propane can create a condensed vapor build-up in the oral cavity leading to internal combustion, damaging the mouth or lungs. Naphtha is also quite carcinogenic, and performance careers built on using it entail a high risk of mouth cancer.
- Common fuels like gasoline and kerosene often contain carcinogenic components, such as sulfurated compounds or benzene. They also are far easier to ignite and even a seasoned fire breather would be at serious risk of injury using these fuels for breathing

=== Self-ignition ===
There is a risk of self ignition while performing fire breathing. Enhanced risk comes from the use of lower flash point fuels, inappropriate fabrics in clothing (such as polyester), wearing other flammable items or products (such as hairspray), poor technique and performance in unsuitable locations.

=== Health ===
When fire breathing with the wrong fuel, or when an improper technique is used, fire breathing can increase the risk of:

- Death
- Severe burns
- Fire breather's pneumonia, a distinct type of lipid pneumonia
- Acute respiratory distress
- Oral and dental problems
- Fuel poisoning
- Dry cough
- Headache, dizziness, drunken ill feeling
- abdominal pains and diarrhea
- nausea and vomiting
- Dry tongue and cotton mouth
- Loss of taste
- Dry skin and topical heat burns
- Cancer of the mouth or throat from petrochemical exposure

== History ==
A Roman slave named Eunus used fire breathing in an attempt to convince his fellow slaves that he had supernatural abilities in order for them to revolt against the Roman authorities. To do this, Eunus hid a nutshell containing burning material in his mouth.

== In modern culture ==
Gene Simmons of the rock band Kiss often includes fire-breathing in the band's shows. "It's pretty dangerous," he observed. "If you don't blow it out and it doesn't explode the right way, it comes back at you. The tip is [for someone who wanted to start breathing fire]… don't. It's not worth it."

The MC Bat Commander, lead singer of the California comedy rock/New Wave/ska band The Aquabats, would regularly breathe fire to start off the band's shows during the late 1990s and early 2000s. Mike Odd, the vocalist for the shock rock/horror metal band Rosemary's Billygoat, included fire breathing in the band's many outlandish stunts, alongside other forms of small-scale pyrotechnics. Zoran Žikić, bass guitarist for the Serbian and Yugoslav hard rock band Kerber, used to perform fire breathing on stage. In 1984, during an open-air concert, he got second degree burns while trying to perform fire breathing under windy conditions. After this incident he was forbidden by the rest of the band members to continue performing the stunt.

== World records ==
=== Simultaneous fire breathing ===
The world record for the number of people simultaneously fire breathing was set on 23 April 2009 by 293 students in the Dutch city of Maastricht as part of the Ragweek charity event.

=== Fire breathing pass ===
In August 2007 the record for the biggest fire breathing pass was set at the Burning Man festival in the Black Rock Desert, Nevada; a single breath was passed to 21 people before the flame went out.

=== Highest flame ===
The world record for the highest flame is 8.05 m (26 ft 5 in), set by Antonio Restivo at a warehouse in Las Vegas, Nevada, USA, on 11 January 2011.

=== Most flames ===
The most consecutive fire flames blown by one mouthful of fuel (without refuelling) is 387, achieved by Tobias Buschick (Germany) in Neuenbürg, Germany, on 1 August 2015.

The most flames blown in one minute is 189 (with refuelling) and was achieved by Zhu Jiangao (China) on the set of CCTV – Guinness World Records Special in Jiangyin, Jiangsu, China on 9 January 2015.

The most flames blown in 30 seconds is 55 (with refuelling) and is held by Christopher Campbell a.k.a. FenyxFyre (Canada) in London, Ontario, Canada, on 26 January 2021.

== See also ==
- Fart lighting
- Fire eating
- Fire performance
