= House of Yes (Brooklyn) =

Nightclub in New York City

Coordinates: 40.706819°N 73.923603°W

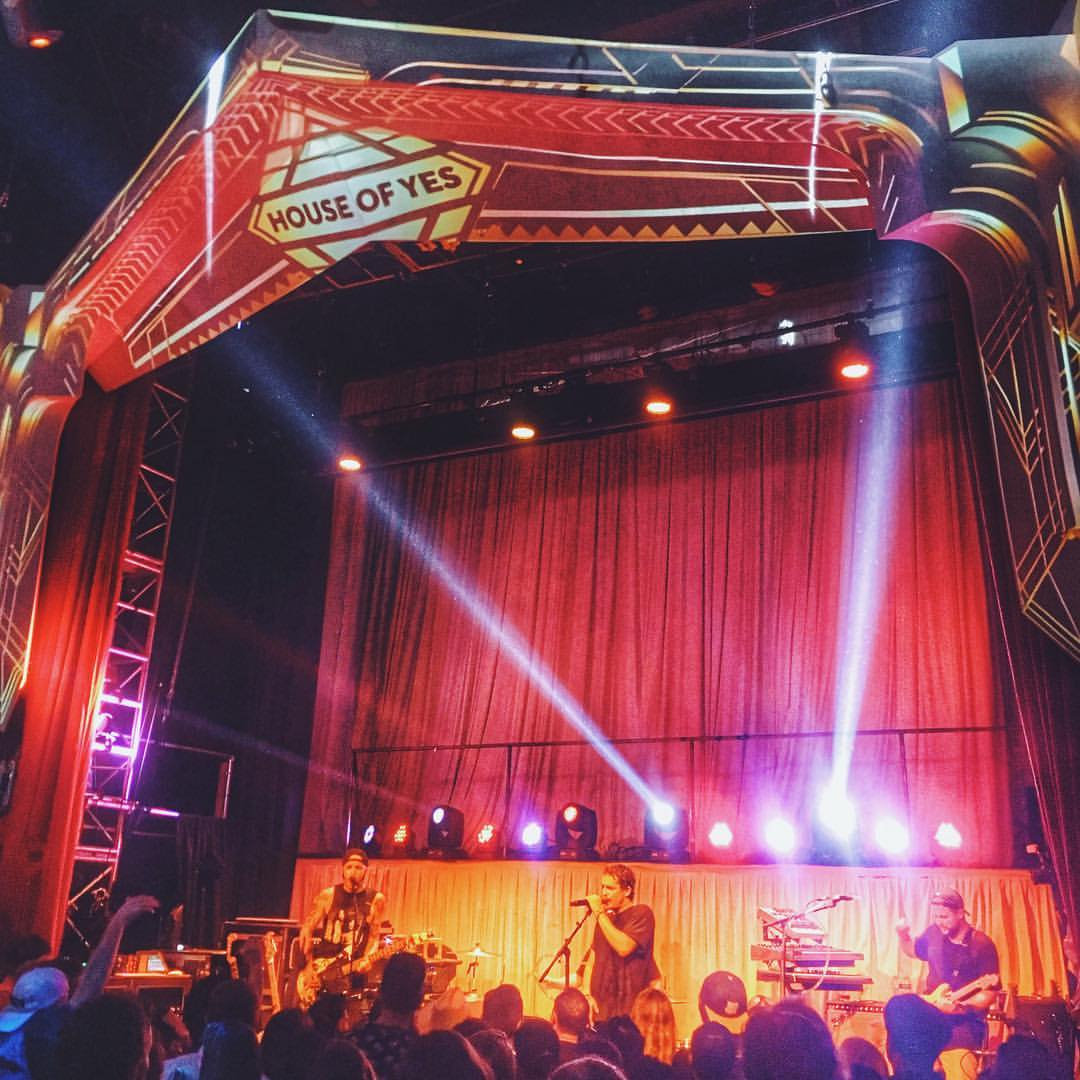
- A performance at House of Yes
- Interactive map of House of Yes
- Address: 2 Wyckoff Ave, Brooklyn, NY 11237
- Location: Bushwick, New York, USA
- Capacity: 475
- Type: Nightclub

Construction
- Opened: 2015; 11 years ago

House of Yes is a creative collective and nightclub in Bushwick, Brooklyn, New York City. The House of Yes nightclub was opened by artists Kae Burke and Anya Sapozhnikova, and partners Justin Ahiyon and Ilan Telmont in 2015.

== History ==
House of Yes was started in 2007 by Kae Burke and Anya Sapozhnikova, two of the producers behind Lady Circus. From July 2008 to August 2013, Sapozhnikova and Burke ran a circus theatre and creative event space in East Williamsburg Brooklyn called the House of Yes, hosting aerial classes, creative events and circus theatre.

The first House of Yes opened in April 2007 in a 2,500-square-foot (230 m^{2}) second-floor loft located at 19-49 Troutman Street. A fire on April 22, 2008 forced a relocation to a dilapidated former ice-house off the Grand Street L train in East Williamsburg in June 2008. Sapozhnikova and Burke built the warehouse into an event space, in collaboration with Lauren Larken of Artistic Evolution, Hassan Spruill, Keelan Kelly, Jordann Baker, Aaron Goldsmith and others in the community.

Five years later Burke and Sapozhnikova collaborated with Telmont and Ahiyon, and opened the doors to a new club at its present location at 2 Wyckoff Ave.

== Nightclub ==
The club is located in the heart of Bushwick. The Brooklyn venue is part nightclub and part self-proclaimed "circus theatre." With a focus on both electronic music and live entertainment, House of Yes boasts high ceilings, video installations and a full backyard, as well as "the best bathrooms you'll ever experience" (also self-proclaimed).

== Expansion ==
In 2019, House of Yes partnered with the Edition Hotel and Ian Schrager of Studio 54 to produce the show "The Devouring", and provide entertainers and DJs at the brand new "Paradise Club", at the Times Square Edition Hotel.

== Culture ==
House of Yes grew out of NYC's Do-It-Yourself and Burning Man scenes. The nightclub is known for wild parties with strange themes, circus performers, burlesque dancers, and more. It is also known for being LGBTQ friendly, having a strict pro-consent policy enforced by "Consenticorns", and being a sex positive nightclub. As performer Sarah Jane Washington wrote in an interview in Vice, "I feel like I can be my most authentic, eccentric, queer self, and feel beautiful and celebrated for it."

I partied there last fall and found it to be a sensory overload of colorful costumes, pulsating beats, and dancers flying through the air. Needless to say, I was anything but bored....We dropped off our coats and headed to dance. This room, which doubles as an entrance, bar, and medium-sized dance floor, was all in blacklight. And those eyes opened and closed mechanically. After surveying the scene, it looked like we were in the ballpark with our costume idea to go glittery, silvery, and ethereal. These partygoers nailed it. We headed inside. At most clubs, people head to the smoking area so they can talk. Burke says she wanted to create a place where "you don't have to smoke cigarettes to connect with people." This airy courtyard seemed like a good start.The main dance floor was sensory overload between the performers, the costumed partygoers, the blacklight, and the video art behind the stage.

== Recognition ==
In 2016, House of Yes was named the #1 thing to do in Brooklyn by 10best.com. BuzzFeed listed House of Yes as #4 on its list of "18 Amazing Things In NYC That Will Give Your Friends FOMO" for its "Dazzling Acrobatics"

In 2018, House of Yes was named the #2 thing to do in the world by Time Out magazine. Later that year, DJ Mag listed House of Yes as the best venue in the Northeast region of North America. Thrillist named it as one of the best dance parties in NYC and for the "woke customer enthusiast".

In 2019, Forbes listed House of Yes as #3 on its list of "The Most Risqué Things To Do In New York". Later that year, Forbes listed the Paradise Club as #7 in its list of "The Absolute Best Nightclubs And Lounges In New York City".
