= Fire breather's pneumonia =

Fire breather’s pneumonia
- Other names: Fire breather's lung, fire-eater's lung
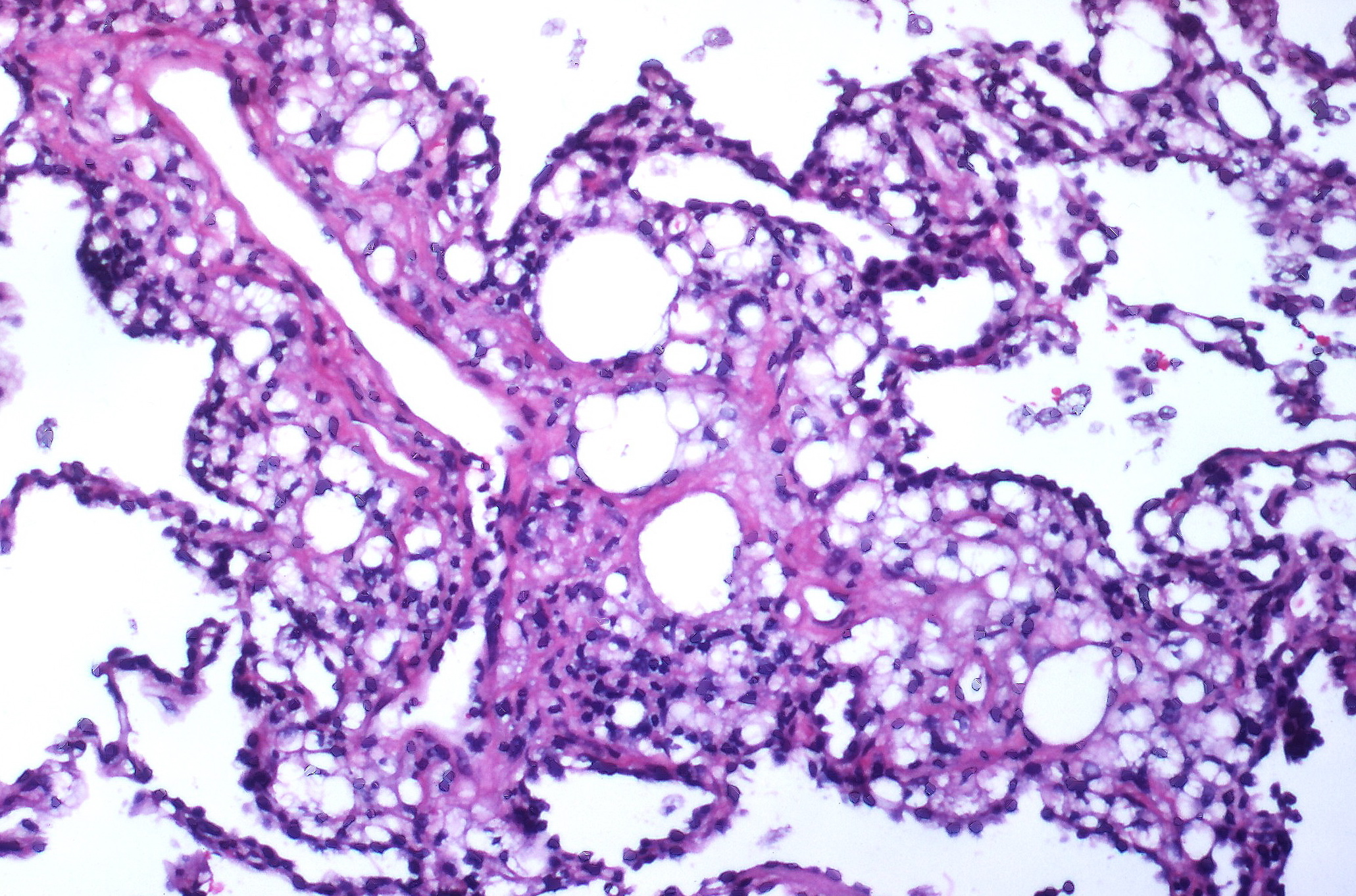
- Numerous interstitial fat globules of varying size accompanied by inflammation and fibrosis is characteristic of chronic lipid pneumonia secondary to lipid aspiration.
- Specialty: Respirology

Fire breather's pneumonia is a distinct type of exogenous—that is, originating outside the body—lipoid pneumonia (chemical pneumonitis) that results from inhalation or aspiration of hydrocarbons of different types, such as lamp oil. Accidental inhalation of hydrocarbon fuels can occur during fire breathing, fire eating, or other fire performance, and may lead to pneumonitis.

Symptoms can vary significantly among individuals, ranging from asymptomatic to a severe, life-threatening disease. Onset usually occurs within hours, though symptoms may not appear for several days. Lipoid pneumonia is a rare condition, but is an occupational hazard of fire performers.

== Signs and symptoms ==
Fire breather’s pneumonia usually presents with certain non-specific symptoms, and may vary significantly among individuals. The most common symptoms include:

- Cough
- Dyspnea (shortness of breath)
- Chest pain
- Fever
- Weakness
- Hemoptysis (coughing up blood)

Acute pneumonitis typically begins asymptomatic, with a worsening of symptoms over the course of hours or days. Following aspiration of fuel, there is often a period of latency from 8–24 hours before the symptoms occur. Patients may not recall a specific instance of aspiration. Severe cases may lead to acute respiratory distress syndrome (ARDS).

== Causes ==
Fire breather’s pneumonia is caused by the entrance of hydrocarbon fuels into the bronchial tree, usually due to accidental aspiration or inhalation during a fire performance show. Fire breathing, or fire blowing, is the act of creating a plume of fire by blowing a mouthful of fuel in a fine mist (atomization) over a source of ignition. Fire eating, or fire swallowing, is the act of putting a flaming object into the mouth and extinguishing it.

In both disciplines, the performer holds their breath until the air is clear of vapors, so as to not inhale the hazardous fumes. However, improper technique or an accident can lead to ingestion, inhalation, or aspiration of fine droplets or vapors. Fire breathing and fire eating are separate acts, but the terms are sometimes erroneously used interchangeably in the literature.

Fuel ingestion can also occur due to siphoning by mouth of fuel products.

Once inhaled, these fuels induce an inflammatory reaction in lung tissue. They are not metabolized by tissue enzymes, but undergo emulsification and become engulfed by macrophages which, with time, may disintegrate and release oily substances surrounded by fibrous tissue and giant cells.

=== Fuels ===
Fire breathing is typically performed with a high flash point fuel, such as lamp oil (liquid paraffin), while fire eating is performed with low flash point fuels, such as white gas or naphtha. Highly purified fuels are preferred by fire performers due to their minimized toxicity, but other, more dangerous fuels may sometimes be used, such as ethanol, isopropanol, kerosene, gasoline, or charcoal lighter fluid. All fuels run the risk of causing pneumonitis if inhaled, however longer chain oils are more persistent than smaller molecules. Alcohols and volatile naphthas are likely to be absorbed or expelled from the body by evaporation and respiration.

== Diagnosis ==
Exogenous lipid pneumonia is rare in the general population, but occupational accidents may not be uncommon in fire performers. Diagnosis is usually made on the basis of history of exposure to hydrocarbon fuels, symptoms, and radiological findings. The radiological findings are nonspecific, and the disease presents with variable patterns and distribution. For this reason, lipoid pneumonia may mimic many other diseases, and the diagnosis is often delayed.

Chest X-rays taken shortly after the accident may or may not be abnormal, but typically over time show infiltrates in the lower lobes of the lungs. High-resolution CT will frequently demonstrate abnormalities, including opacities, pleural effusion, consolidation, or pulmonary nodules. Histopathology of lung biopsy or bronchoalveolar lavage may indicate lipid-laden macrophages. Laboratory results may show highly elevated inflammatory markers.

== Treatment ==
The course of treatment of fire breather's pneumonia remains controversial. Administration of bronchodilators, corticosteroids, and prophylactic antibiotics to prevent secondary infection is a common course of treatment. Some studies suggest that steroids may improve outcomes in severely affected individuals, yet these data are only based on a limited number of patients. The use of gastric decontamination to prevent subsequent pulmonary injury from hydrocarbon ingestion is controversial. It may have potential benefit in large (> 30 cc), intentional ingestion of compounds with systemic toxicity.

Prognosis after peak symptoms is typically good, with most patients making a full recovery in weeks to months.
