= Fire eating =

Extinguishing a flaming object in the mouth

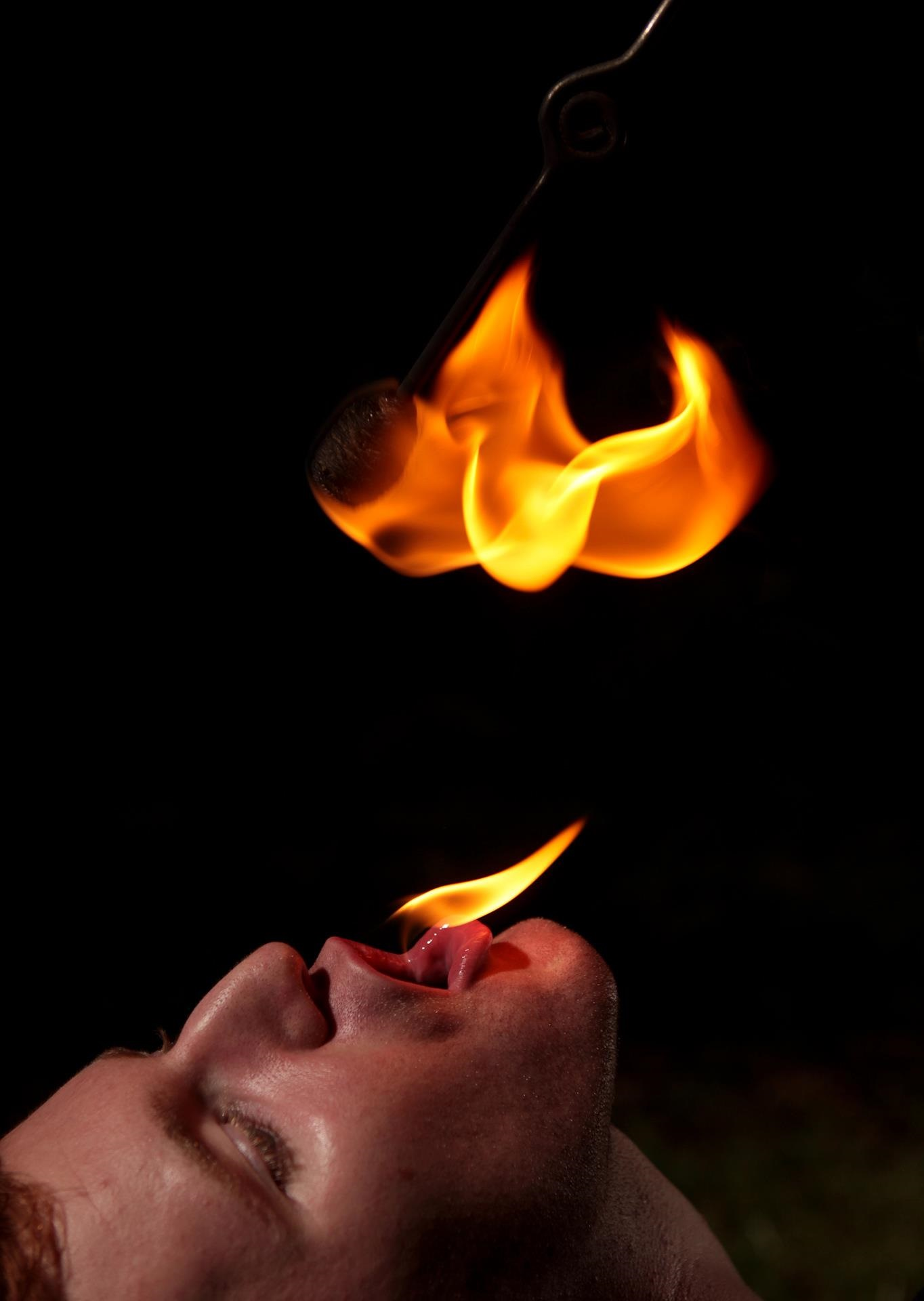
Fire eating trick

Brian Brushwood performing fire eating tricks.

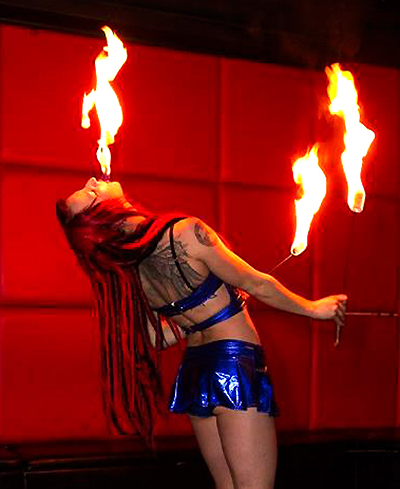
A fire eating trick performed at a bar in New York City

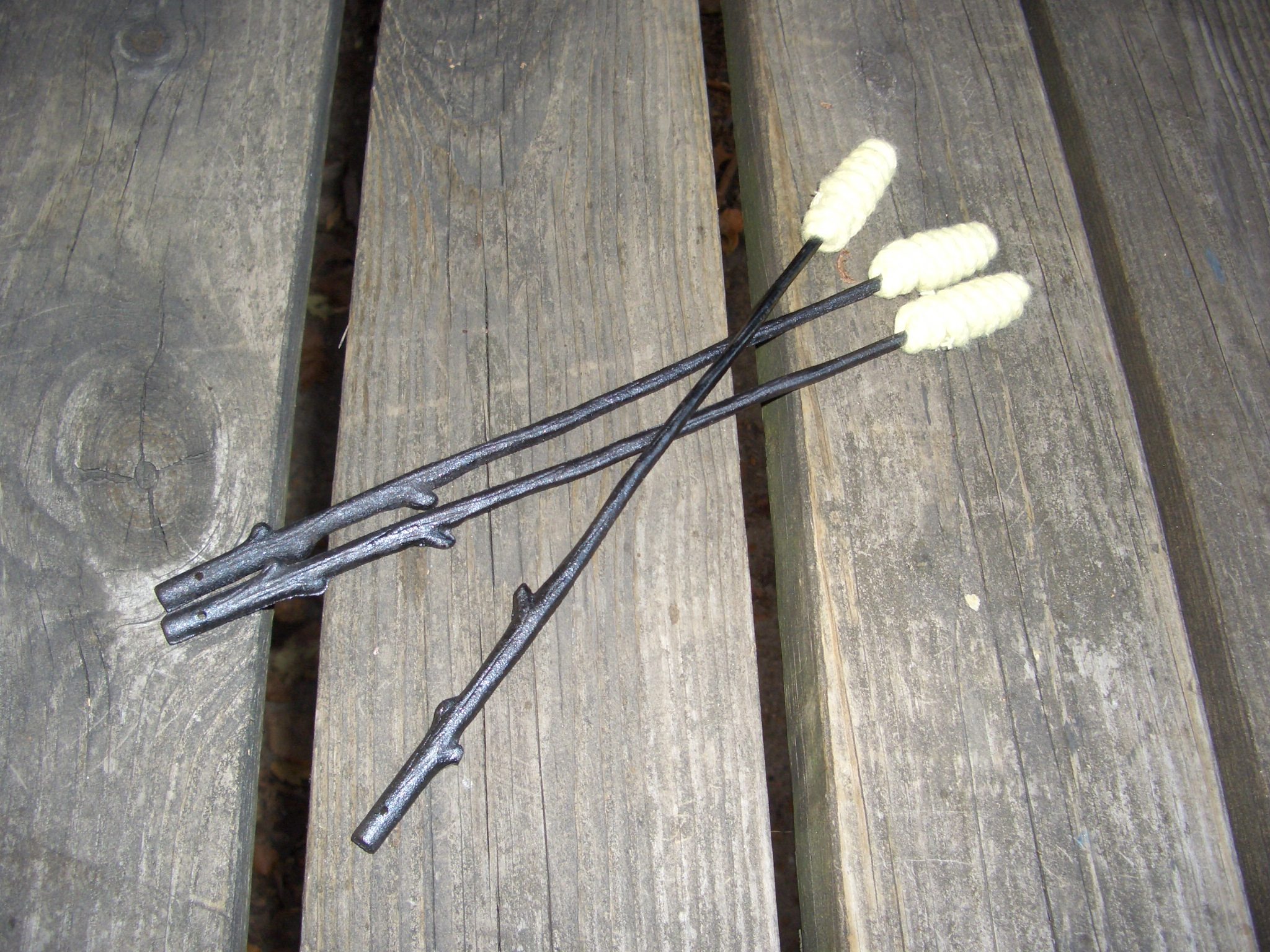
A set of simple cast iron fire eating torches

Video of fire eating.

Fire eating (a.k.a. pyrophagia) is the act of putting a flaming object into the mouth and extinguishing it. A fire eater can be an entertainer, a street performer, part of a sideshow or a circus act but has also been part of spiritual tradition in India.

== Physics and hazards ==
Fire eating relies on the quick extinguishing of the fire in the mouth or on the touched surfaces and on the short term cooling effects of water evaporation at the surface on the source of fire (usually with a low percentage of alcohol mixed in the water) or saliva in the mouth. This allows for igniting a damp handkerchief or a bill of money without it burning. Closing the mouth, or covering it with a slap of the hand cuts off the oxygen to the fire. Blowing on it can remove the very thin area of reaction from the source of fuel, and thus extinguish the fire in some cases, where the blown air is faster than the fire front and the flame is small enough to be entirely removed.

Contrary to what many may assume, the flame itself is not a cold flame. This can be proven by a number of things. For starters, a cold flame can only be visible in total darkness, but many flame eating tricks happen in the light. Also, a cold flame is a chemical flame that can't be formed using a traditional torch. Certain materials are avoided when doing the trick, such as materials which may easily ignite, melt or store the heat and release it later. These include paraffin candles, plastic, and thick multithreaded rope.

According to Daniel Mannix's 1951 sideshow memoir Step right up!, the real "secret" to fire eating is enduring pain; he mentions that tolerating constant blisters on your tongue, lips and throat is also necessary. Many other fire eaters dismiss this, claiming that skilled fire eaters should not burn themselves. The most common method of safely performing fire eating acts relies on the fact that it takes time to transfer heat, and that heat rises in air. Fire eating and fire breathing (and all variants) is a skill which should be passed on from a skilled master to an appropriate student and almost all teachings include instructions on first aid, fire safety, chemistry and other appropriate skills. Accidental ingestion of fuel or improper technique can lead to a serious condition known as fire eater's pneumonia.

Even professional eating artists still face slight injuries every time they perform the trick. If all goes well in the trick, the artist will still end up getting slightly poisoned by their fuel, developing small blisters within their mouth, and constantly having awful headaches from the fuel. It has also been found to be dangerous to inhale hydrocarbons from flames because they can cause many of the issues listed above. It should certainly be made apparent that fire eating can also cause long term health effects especially if done incorrectly.

== History ==
Fire eating was a common part of Hindu, Sadhu, and Fakir performances to show spiritual attainment. It became a part of the standard sideshow acts in the late 1880s and was often seen as one of the entry-level skills for sideshow performers.

Although not the earliest, the first to attract the attention of the upper classes was an Englishman named Richardson, who first performed in France in 1667. Richardson "munched glowing coals, drank flaming liquids, and otherwise appeared to prove that he was unharmed by fire". His methods were subsequently made public by his servant.

A famous fire eater from the 18th century was Robert Powell who allegedly not only swallowed fire but also red-hot coals, melted sealing wax and even brimstone. He performed, often in front of British and other European royalty and nobility, for nearly sixty years and, in 1751, was awarded a purse of gold and a large silver medal. Other fire eaters include the magicians Ching Ling Foo and Daniel P. Mannix.

== Guinness World Records ==
The most torches extinguished in one minute with the mouth (using multiple rods) is 99 and was achieved by Bret Pasek (U.S.) at the Minnesota Renaissance Festival in Shakopee, Minnesota, on 7 September 2014.

In 2018, this record was later beaten by Brant Matthews, who extinguished 101 torches in the same minute time frame.

== See also ==
- Fire breathing
- Fire performance
- Fire eater (disambiguation)
